= Historiography of the Christianization of the Roman Empire =

Area of study on conversion to Christianity

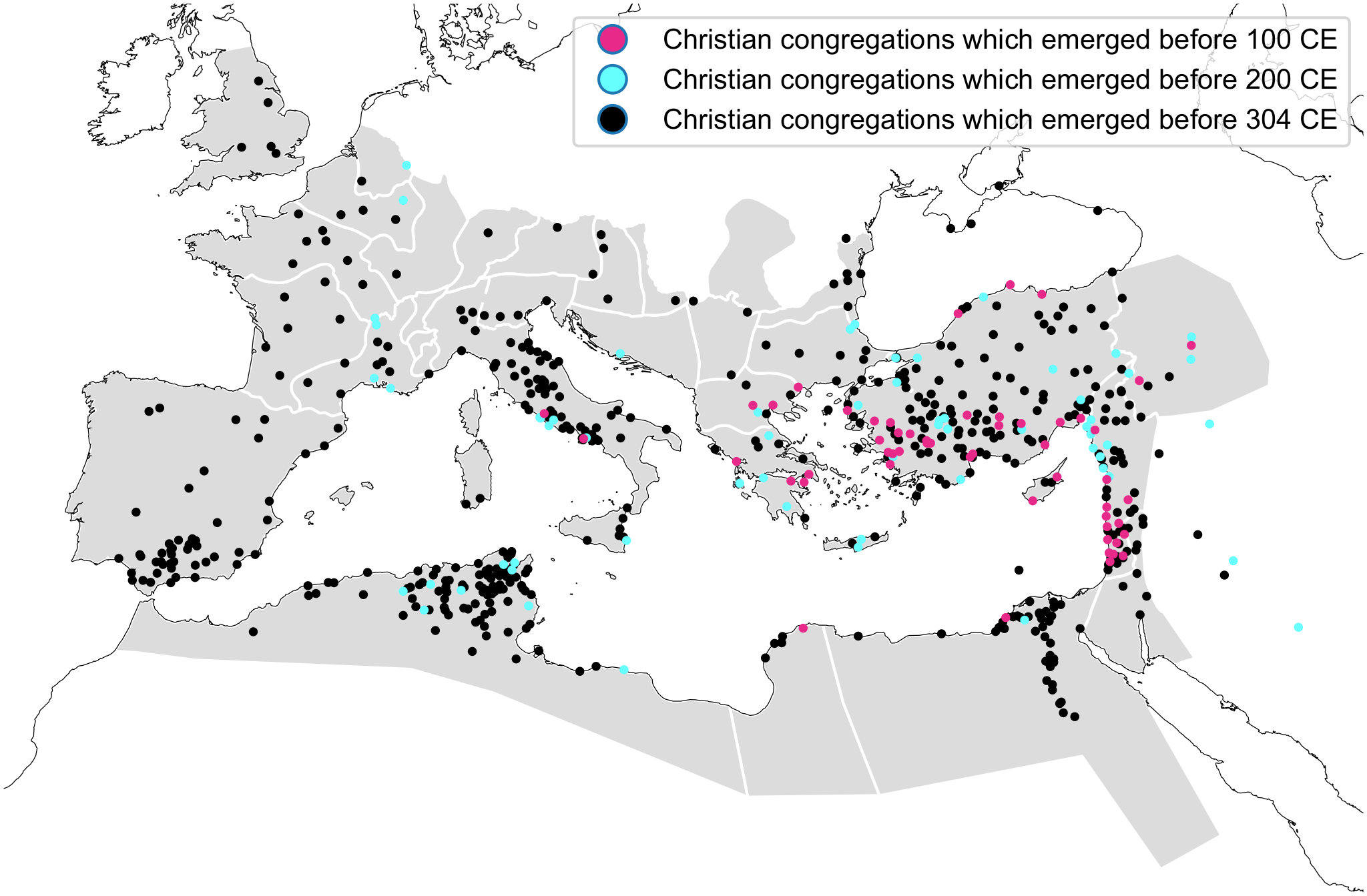
Map of the Roman Empire with the distribution of Christian congregations of the first three centuries AD

The growth of early Christianity from its obscure origin c. AD 40, with fewer than 1,000 followers, to being the majority religion of the entire Roman Empire by AD 400, has been examined through a wide variety of historiographical approaches.

Until the last decades of the 20th century, the primary theory was provided by Edward Gibbon in The History of the Decline and Fall of the Roman Empire, published in 1776. Gibbon theorized that paganism declined from the second century BC and was finally eliminated by the top-down imposition of Christianity by Constantine, the first Christian emperor, and his successors in the fourth century AD.

For over 200 years, Gibbon's model and its expanded explanatory versions—the conflict model and the legislative model—have provided the major narrative. The conflict model asserts that Christianity rose in conflict with paganism, defeating it only after emperors became Christian and were willing to use their power to require conversion through coercion. The legislative model is based on the Theodosian Code published in AD 438.

In the last decade of the 20th century and into the 21st century, multiple new discoveries of texts and documents, along with new research (such as modern archaeology and numismatics), combined with new fields of study (such as sociology and anthropology) and modern mathematical modeling, have undermined much of this traditional view. According to modern theories, Christianity became established in the third century, before Constantine; paganism did not end in the fourth century; and imperial legislation had only limited effect before the era of the Eastern emperor Justinian I (reign 527 to 565). In the twenty-first century, the conflict model has become marginalized, while a grassroots theory has developed.

Alternative theories involve psychology or evolution of cultural selection, with many 21st-century scholars asserting that sociological models such as network theory and diffusion of innovation provide the most insight into the societal change. Sociology has also generated the theory that Christianity spread as a grassroots movement that grew from the bottom up; it includes ideas and practices such as charity, egalitarianism, accessibility and a clear message, demonstrating its appeal to people over the alternatives available to most in the Roman Empire of the time. The effects of this religious change are seen as mixed and are debated.

== History ==
=== Of historiography ===
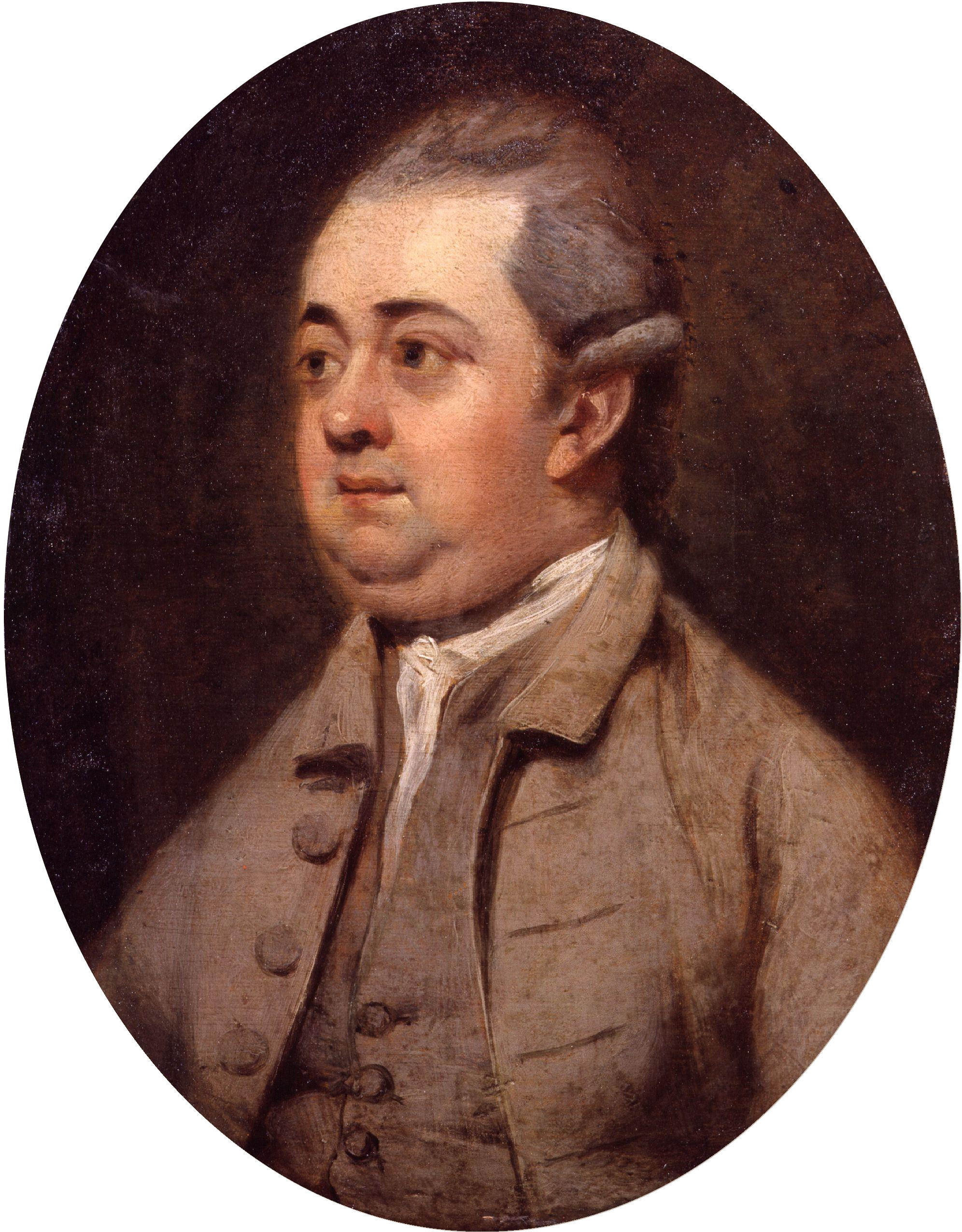
Edward Gibbon, author of The History of the Decline and Fall of the Roman Empire

The standard view of paganism (traditional city-based polytheistic Graeco-Roman religion) in the Roman empire has long been one of decline beginning in the second and first centuries BC. Decline was interrupted by the short-lived 'Restoration' under the emperor Augustus (reign 27 BC – AD 14), then it resumed. In the process of decline, it has been thought that Roman religion embraced emperor worship, the 'oriental cults' and Christianity as symptoms of that decline. Christianity emerged as a major religious movement in the Roman Empire, the barbarian kingdoms of the West, in neighboring kingdoms and some parts of the Persian and Sassanian empires.

The major narrative concerning the rise of Christianity has, for over 200 years since its publication in 1776, been taken primarily from historian Edward Gibbon's Decline and Fall. Gibbon had seen Constantine as driven by "boundless ambition" and a desire for personal glory to force Christianity on the rest of the empire in a cynical, political move thereby achieving, "in less than a century, the final conquest of the Roman empire". It wasn't until 1936 that scholars such as Arnaldo Momigliano began to question Gibbon's view.

In 1953, art historian Alois Riegl provided the first true departure, writing that there were no qualitative differences in art and no periods of decline throughout Late Antiquity. In 1975, the concept of "history" was expanded to include sources outside ancient historical narrative and traditional literary works. The evidentiary basis expanded to include legal practices, economics, the history of ideas, coins, gravestones, architecture, archaeology and more. In the 1980s, syntheses began to pull together the results of this more detailed work. In the closing quarter of the twentieth century, scholarship advanced significantly.

Gibbon's historical sources were almost exclusively Christian literary documents. These documents have a starkly supernatural quality, and many are hagiographical. They present the rise of Christianity in terms of conquest which had taken place in Heaven where the Christian God had defeated the pagan gods. Fourth century Christian writers depict Constantine's conversion as proof of that defeat, and Christian writings are filled with proclaiming their heavenly "triumph".

According to Peter Brown: "The belief that Late Antiquity witnessed the death of paganism and the triumph of monotheism, ... is not actual history but is, instead, a "representation" of the history of the age created by "a brilliant generation of Christian writers, polemicists and preachers in the last decade of this period". Ramsay MacMullen writes that: "We may fairly accuse the historical record of having failed us, not just in the familiar way, being simply insufficient, but also through being distorted". Historian Rita Lizzi Testa adds "Transcending the limitations of the Enlightenment's interpretive categories" has meant restructuring understanding of the late Roman empire. The result has been a radically altered picture. According to the Oxford Handbook of Late Antiquity, scholars have largely abandoned Gibbon's views of decline, crisis and fall.

Most contemporary scholars, such as philosophy professor Antonio Donato, consider current understanding to be more precise and accurate than ever before. However, this "new view" has also been criticized, and the decline of paganism has been taken up again by some scholars. Not all the classic themes have lost their value in current scholarship. In 2001, Wolf Liebeschuetz suggested that some special situations, such as the era between the imperial age and the Middle ages, require the concept of crisis to be understood.

=== Roman religion ===
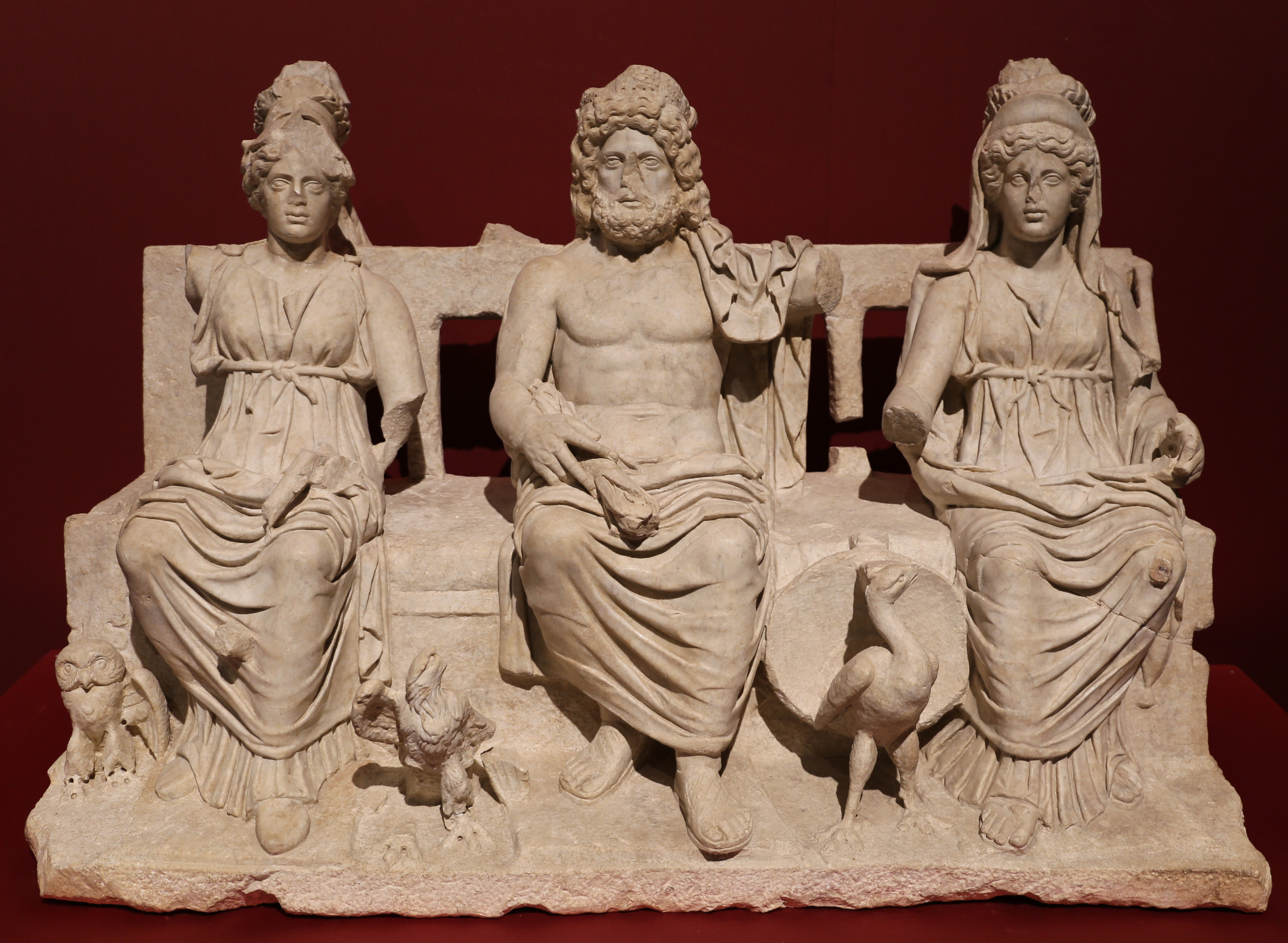
The Capitoline Triad, second century sculpture. The Roman gods Minerva, Jupiter and Juno

Religion in Graeco-Roman times differed from religion in modern times. In the early Roman Empire religion was polytheistic and local. It was not focused on the individual but was focused on the good of the city: it was a civic religion in which ritual was the main form of worship. Politics and religion were intertwined, and many public rituals were performed by public officials. Respect for ancestral custom was a large part of polytheistic belief and practice, and members of the local society were expected to take part in public rituals.

Roman historians, such as the classicist J. A. North, have written that Roman imperial culture began in the first century with religion embedded in the city-state, then gradually shifted to religion as a personal choice. Roman religion's willingness to adopt foreign gods and practices into its pantheon meant that, as Rome expanded, it also gained local gods which offered different characteristics, experiences, insights, and stories. There is consensus among scholars that religious identity became increasingly separated from civic and political identity, progressively giving way to the plurality of religious options rooted in other identities, needs and interests.

Formerly, scholars believed that this plurality contributed to the slow decline of polytheism that began in the second century BC, and this axiom was rarely challenged. James B. Rives, classics scholar, has written that:

Evidence for neglect and manipulation could readily be found, ... But, as more recent scholars have argued, this evidence has often been cited without proper consideration of its context; at the same time, other evidence that presents a different picture has been dismissed out of hand.

==== Context and other evidence ====
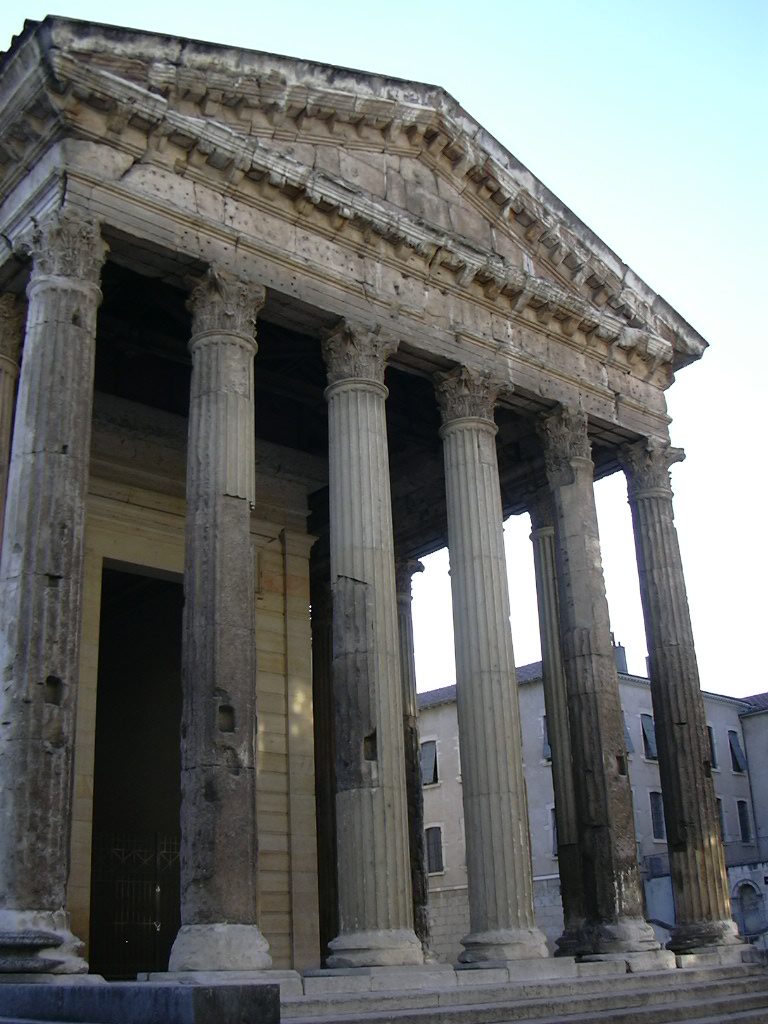
Temple of Augustus and Livia, Vienne (modern France). Originally dedicated to Augustus and Roma. Augustus was deified on his death in AD 14: his widow Livia was deified in AD 42 by Claudius

After 1990, evidence expanded and altered the picture of late antique paganism. For example, private cults of the emperor were previously greatly underestimated. For many years, the imperial cult was regarded by the majority of scholars as both a symptom and a cause of the final decline of traditional Graeco-Roman religion. It was assumed this kind of worship of a man could only be possible in a system that had become completely devoid of real religious meaning. It was, therefore, generally treated as a "political phenomenon cloaked in religious dress". However, scholarship of the twenty-first century has shifted toward seeing it as a genuine religious phenomenon.

Classical scholar Simon Price used anthropological models to show that the imperial cult's rituals and iconography were elements of a way of thinking that people formed as a means of coming to terms with the tremendous power of Roman emperors. The emperor was "conceived in terms of honors ... as the representation of power" personifying the intermediary between the human and the divine. According to Rives, "Most recent scholars have accepted Price's approach".

Recent literary evidence reveals emperor worship at the domestic level with his image "among the household gods". Innumerable small images of emperors have been found in a wide range of media that are being reevaluated as religiously significant. Rives adds that "epigraphic evidence reveals the existence of numerous private associations of 'worshippers of the emperor' or 'of the emperor's image', many of which seem to have developed from household associations". It is now recognized that these private cults were "very common and widespread indeed, in the domus, in the streets, in public squares, in Rome itself (perhaps there in particular) as well as outside the capital".

=== Spread of Christianity ===
==== Origin ====
Christianity emerged as a sect of Second Temple Judaism in Roman Judaea, part of the syncretistic Hellenistic world of the first century AD, which was dominated by Roman law and Greek culture. It started with the ministry of Jesus, who proclaimed the coming of the Kingdom of God. After his death by crucifixion, some of his followers are said to have seen Jesus, and proclaimed him to be alive and resurrected by God.

When Christianity spread beyond Judaea, it first arrived in Jewish diaspora communities. The early Gospel message spread orally, probably originally in Aramaic, but almost immediately also in Greek. Within the first century, the messages began to be recorded in writing and spread abroad. The earliest writings are generally thought to be those of the Apostle Paul who spoke of Jesus as both divine and human. The degree of each of these characteristics later became cause for controversy beginning with Gnosticism which denied Jesus' humanity and Arianism which downgraded his divinity.

Christianity began to expand almost immediately from its initial Jewish base to Gentiles (non-Jews). Both Peter and Paul are sometimes referred to as Apostles to the Gentiles. This led to disputes with those requiring the continued observance of the whole Mosaic law including the requirement for circumcision. James the Just called the Council of Jerusalem (around AD 50) which determined that converts should avoid "pollution of idols, fornication, things strangled, and blood" but should not be required to follow other aspects of Jewish Law (KJV, Acts 15:20–21). As Christianity grew in the Gentile world, it underwent a gradual separation from Judaism.

Christianization was never a one-way process. Instead, there has always been a kind of parallelism as it absorbed indigenous elements just as indigenous religions absorbed aspects of Christianity. Michelle Salzman has shown that in the process of converting the Roman Empire's aristocracy, Christianity absorbed the values of that aristocracy. Several early Christian writers, including Justin (2nd century), Tertullian, and Origen (3rd century) wrote of Mithraists "copying" Christian beliefs. Christianity adopted aspects of Platonic thought, names for months and days of the week – even the concept of a seven-day week – from Roman paganism. Bruce David Forbes says that "Some way or another, Christmas was started to compete with rival Roman religions, or to co-opt the winter celebrations as a way to spread Christianity, or to baptize the winter festivals with Christian meaning in an effort to limit their [drunken] excesses. Most likely all three". Some scholars have suggested that characteristics of some pagan gods — or at least their roles — were transferred to Christian saints after the fourth century. Demetrius of Thessaloniki became venerated as the patron of agriculture during the Middle Ages. According to historian Hans Kloft, that was because the Eleusinian Mysteries, Demeter's cult, ended in the 4th century, and the Greek rural population gradually transferred her rites and roles onto the Christian saint Demetrius.

==== Reception and growth in Roman society ====
For the followers of traditional Roman religions, Christianity was seen as an odd entity, not quite Roman, but not quite barbarian either. Christians criticized fundamental beliefs of Roman society, and refused to participate in rituals, festivals and the imperial cult. They were a target for suspicion and rumor, including rumors that they were politically subversive and practiced black magic, incest and cannibalism. Conversions tore families apart: Justin Martyr tells of a pagan husband who denounced his Christian wife, and Tertullian tells of children disinherited for becoming Christians. Despite this, for most of its first three centuries, Christianity was usually tolerated, and episodes of persecution tended to be localized actions by mobs and governors. Suetonius and Tacitus both record emperor Nero persecuting Christians in the mid-1st century, however this only occurred within Rome itself. There were no empire-wide persecutions until Christianity reached a critical juncture in the mid-third century.

Beginning with less than 1000 people, by the year 100, Christianity had grown to perhaps one hundred small household churches consisting of an average of around seventy (12–200) members each. These churches were a segmented series of small groups. By 200, Christian numbers had grown to over 200,000 people, and communities with an average size of 500–1000 people existed in approximately 200–400 towns. By the mid-3rd century, the little house-churches where Christians had assembled were being succeeded by buildings adapted or designed to be churches complete with assembly rooms, classrooms, and dining rooms. The earliest dated church building to survive comes from around this time.

In his mathematical modelling, Rodney Stark estimates that Christians made up around 1.9% of the Roman population in 250. That year, Decius made it a capital offence to refuse to make sacrifices to Roman Gods, although it did not outlaw Christian worship and may not have targeted Christians specifically. Valerian pursued similar policies later that decade. These were followed by a 40-year period of tolerance known as the "little peace of the Church". Christianity grew in that time to have a major demographic presence. Stark, building on earlier estimates by theologian Robert M. Grant and historian Ramsay MacMullen, estimates that Christians made up around ten percent of the Roman population by 300. The last and most severe official persecution, the Diocletianic Persecution, took place in 303–311.

==== Under Constantine and his Christian successors ====
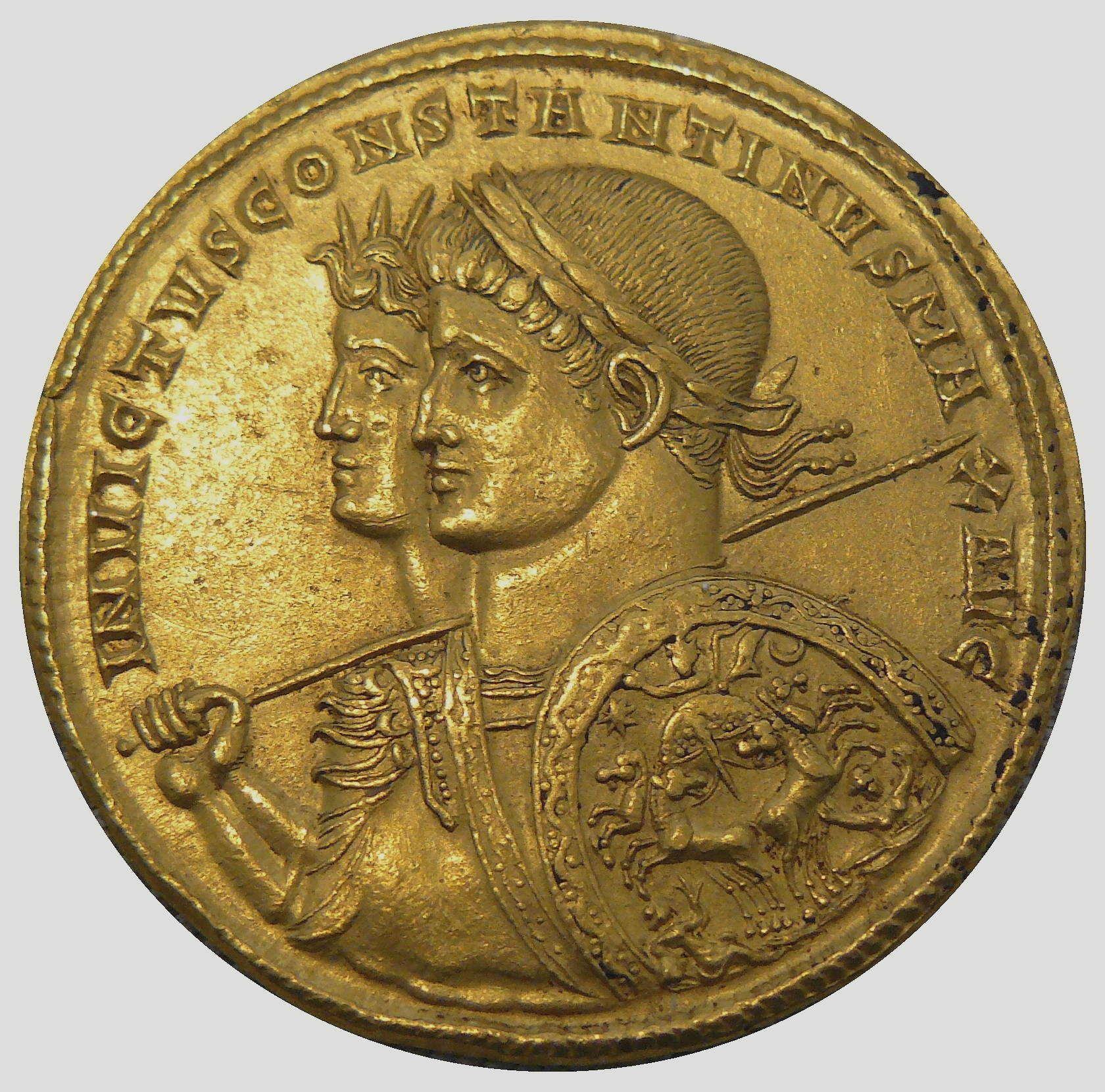
Jugate gold multiple issued by Constantine at Ticinum in 313, showing the emperor and the god Sol, with Sol also depicted in his quadriga (chariot) on Constantine's shield.

Constantine, who gained full control of the empire in 312, became the first Christian emperor. Although he was not baptised until shortly before his death, he pursued policies that were favorable to Christianity. The Edict of Milan of 313 ended official persecutions of Christianity extending toleration to all religions. Constantine supported the Church financially, built basilicas, granted privileges to clergy which had previously been available only to pagan priests (such as exemption from certain taxes), promoted Christians to high office, and returned property confiscated during the persecutions. He also sponsored the First Council of Nicea to codify aspects of Christian doctrine.

According to Stark, the rate of Christianity's growth under its first Christian emperor in the 4th century did not alter (more than normal regional fluctuations) from its rate of growth in the first three centuries. However, since Stark describes an exponential growth curve, he adds that this "probably was a period of 'miraculous seeming' growth in terms of absolute numbers". By the middle of the century, it is likely that Christians comprised just over half of the empire's population.

A study by Edwin A. Judge, social scientist, shows that a fully organized church system existed before Constantine and the Council of Nicea. From this, Judge concludes "the argument Christianity owed its triumph to its adoption by Constantine cannot be sustained". Critical mass had been achieved in the hundred years between 150 and 250 which saw Christianity move from fewer than 50,000 adherents to over a million. There was a significant rise in the absolute number of Christians in the rest of the third century. Classics professor Seth Schwartz states the number of Christians in existence by the end of the third century indicates Christianity's successful establishment predated Constantine.

Under Constantine and his sons, certain pagan rites, including animal sacrifice and divination, began being deprived of their previous position in Roman civilization. Yet other pagan practices were tolerated, Constantine did not stop the established state support of the traditional religious institutions, nor did society substantially change its pagan nature under his rule. Constantine's policies were largely continued by his sons, though not universally or continuously.

Peter Brown has written that, "it would be profoundly misleading" to claim that the cultural and social changes that took place in Late Antiquity reflected "in any way" a process of Christianization. Instead, the "flowering of a vigorous public culture that polytheists, Jews and Christians alike could share... [that] could be described as Christian "only in the narrowest sense" developed. It is true that blood sacrifice played no part in that culture, but the sheer success and unusual stability of the Constantinian and post-Constantinian state also ensured that "the edges of potential conflict were blurred... It would be wrong to look for further signs of Christianization at this time. It is impossible to speak of a Christian empire as existing before Justinian".

==== Theodosius I ====
In the centuries following his death, Theodosius I (347 – 395) gained a reputation as the emperor who targeted and eliminated paganism in order to establish Nicene Christianity as the official religion of the empire. Modern historians see this as an interpretation of history rather than actual history. Cameron writes that Theodosius's predecessors Constantine, Constantius, and Valens had all been semi-Arians; therefore, Christian literary tradition gave the orthodox Theodosius most of the credit for the final triumph of Christianity. (Note: Nearly all the sources available on Theodosius are ecclesiastical histories that are highly colored and carefully curated for public reading. Beginning with contemporaries like the bishop Ambrose, and followed in the next century by church historians such as Theodoret, these histories focus on Theodosius' impact on the church as uniformly positive, orthodox and anti-pagan, frequently going beyond admiration into panegyric and hagiography. The withdrawal of state funding to pagan cults, which belongs to Gratian, the ending of the Vestal virgins, which continued to 415, and the demolition of temples (for which there is no primary evidence) have been wrongly attributed to Theodosius. Theodosius was also associated with ending the ancient Olympic Games. Sofie Remijsen says there are several reasons to conclude the Olympic games continued after Theodosius I. Among them are two extant scholia on Lucian that connect the end of the games with a fire that burned down the temple of the Olympian Zeus during Theodosius the second's reign.)

In keeping with this view of Theodosius, some previous scholars interpreted the Edict of Thessalonica (380) as establishing Christianity as the state religion. German ancient historian Karl Leo Noethlichs writes that the Edict of Thessalonica did not declare Christianity to be the official religion of the empire, and it gave no advantage to Christians over other faiths. The Edict was addressed to the people of the city of Constantinople, it opposed Arianism, attempted to establish unity in Christianity and suppress heresy. (Note: The Edict applied only to Christians since only Christians could be heretics. Within that group, it was addressed to Arians, since it is opposition to the Nicene religion of Pontiff Damasus and Peter, Bishop of Alexandria, which is specifically referenced. It declared those Christians who refused the Nicene faith to be infames, and prohibited them from using Christian churches. Sáry uses this example: "After his arrival in Constantinople, Theodosius offered to confirm the Arian bishop Demophilus in his see, if he would accept the Nicene Creed. After Demophilus refused the offer, the emperor immediately directed him to surrender all his churches to the Catholics.") Hungarian legal scholar Pál Sáry says it is clear from mandates issued in the years after 380 that Theodosius had made no requirement in the Edict for pagans or Jews to convert to Christianity: "In 393, the emperor was gravely disturbed that the Jewish assemblies had been forbidden in certain places. For this reason, he stated with emphasis that the sect of the Jews was forbidden by no law."

There is little, if any, evidence that Theodosius I pursued an active policy against the traditional cults, though he did reinforce laws against sacrifice, and write several laws against all forms of heresy. Scholars generally agree that Theodosius began his rule with a cautiously tolerant attitude and policy toward pagans. Three successive laws issued in February 391 and in June and November of 392 have been seen by some as a marked change in Theodosius' policy putting an end to tolerance. Roman historian Alan Cameron has written on the laws of 391 and June 392 as being responses to local appeals that restated, as instructions, what had been requested by the locals. Cameron says these laws were never intended to be binding on the population at large.

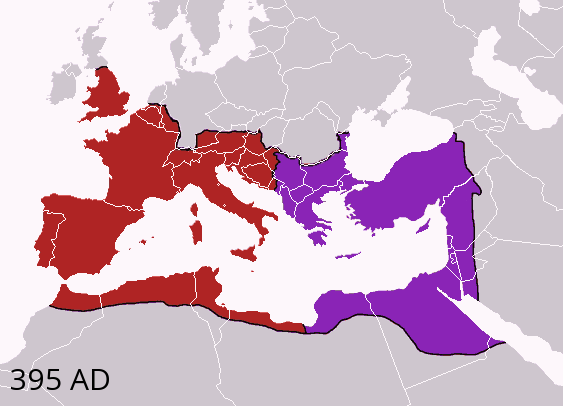
Theodosius I's empire

The law of 8 November 392 has been described by some as the universal ban on paganism that made Christianity the official religion of the empire. The law was addressed only to Rufinus in the East, it makes no mention of Christianity, and it focuses on practices of private domestic sacrifice: the lares, the penates and the genius. The lares is the god who takes care of the home, write archaeologists Konstantinos Bilias and Francesca Grigolo. The genius was fixed on a person, usually the head of the household. The penates were the divinities who provided and guarded the food and possessions of the household. Sacrifice had largely ended by the time of Julian (361-363), a generation before the law of November 392 was issued, but these private, domestic, sometimes daily, sacrifices were thought to have "slipped out from under public control". Sozomen, the Constantinopolitan lawyer, wrote a history of the church around 443 where he evaluates the law of 8 November 392 as having had only minor significance at the time it was issued.

Historical and literary sources, excepting the laws themselves, do not support the view that Theodosius created an environment of intolerance and persecution of pagans. During the reign of Theodosius, pagans were continuously appointed to prominent positions, and pagan aristocrats remained in high offices. During his first official tour of Italy (389–391), the emperor won over the influential pagan lobby in the Roman Senate by appointing its foremost members to important administrative posts. Theodosius also nominated the last pair of pagan consuls in Roman history (Tatianus and Symmachus) in 391. Theodosius allowed pagan practices – that did not involve sacrifice – to be performed publicly and temples to remain open.

He also voiced his support for the preservation of temple buildings, but failed to prevent the damage of several holy sites in the eastern provinces, which most scholars believe was sponsored by Cynegius, Theodosius' praetorian prefect. Some scholars have held Theodosius responsible for his prefect's behavior. Following Cynegius' death in 388, Theodosius replaced him with a moderate pagan who subsequently moved to protect the temples. There is no evidence of any desire on the part of the emperor to institute a systematic destruction of temples anywhere in the Theodosian Code, and no evidence in the archaeological record that extensive temple destruction took place.

While conceding that Theodosius's reign may have been a watershed period in the decline of the old religions, Cameron downplays the emperor's religious legislation as having a limited role. In his 2020 biography of Theodosius, Mark Hebblewhite concludes that Theodosius never saw himself, or advertised himself, as a destroyer of the old cults.

===== Theodosius II and Pope Leo I =====
By the early fifth century, the senatorial aristocracy had almost universally converted to Christianity. This Christianized Roman aristocracy was able to maintain, in Italy, up to the end of the sixth century, the secular traditions of the city of Rome. This survival of secular tradition was aided by the imperial government, but also by Pope Leo I. Peter Brown writes that from the very beginning of his pontificate in the Western Empire (440–61), Leo "ensured that the 'Romans of Rome' should have a say in the religious life of the City".

The Western Roman Empire declined during the 5th century, while the Eastern Roman Empire during the reign of Emperor Theodosius II (408–50) was functioning well. Theodosius II enjoyed a strong position at the centre of the imperial system. Decline in the West led both Eastern and Western authorities to assert their right to power and authority over the Western Empire. Theodosius II's claim was based on Roman law and military power. Leo responded, using the concept of inherited 'Petrine' authority. The Councils of Ephesus and Chalcedon in 449 and 451, convened by Theodosius II (407–450) and Marcian (450–457) respectively, were unacceptable to the papacy. Pope Leo attempted to challenge the imperial decisions taken at these councils. He argued that the emperor should concern himself with 'secular matters', while 'divine matters' had a different quality and should be managed by 'priests' (sacerdotes).

Western and Eastern Roman Empires AD 476

Pope Leo was not successful. The Roman emperors of the first three centuries had seen the control of religion as one of their functions, taking among their titles pontifex maximus ("chief priest") of the official cults. The Western Christian emperors did not see themselves as priests, surrendering the title pontifex maximus under the emperor Gratian. The Christian Eastern emperors, on the other hand, believed the regulation of religious affairs to be one of their prerogatives. The Western emperor Valentinian III (425–55) was, in essence, appointed by Theodosius, and there is some evidence for Valentinian willingly acquiescing to the East's policies. Without the support of the Western emperor Leo accepted Theodosius' authority over the West, thereby beginning the trend toward state control of the church.

==== Sixth to eighth centuries ====
Byzantine Empire under Justinian's uncle Justin I shown in the darker color (orange). The lighter color (gold) shows the conquests of his successor, Justinian I with the Byzantine Empire (about 550) at its greatest extent

In 535, Justinian I attempted to assert control of Italy, resulting in the Gothic War which lasted 20 years. Once fighting ceased, the senatorial aristocracy returned to Rome for a period of reconstruction. Changes from the war, and from Justinian's 'adjustments' to Italy's administration in the decades after it, removed the supports that had allowed the aristocracy to retain power. The Senate declined rapidly at the end of the sixth and early seventh century coming to its end sometime before 630 when its building was converted into a church. Bishops stepped into roles of civic leadership in the former senator's places. The position and influence of the pope rose.

Justinian took an active concern in ecclesiastical affairs and this accelerated the trend towards the control of the Church by the State. Where Constantine had granted, through the Edict of Milan, the right to all peoples to follow freely whatever religion they wished, the religious policy of Justinian I reflected his conviction that a unified Empire presupposed unity of faith. Under emperor Justinian, "the full force of imperial legislation against deviants of all kinds, particularly religious" ones, was applied in practice, writes Judith Herrin, historian of late antiquity. Pierre Chuvin describes the severe legislation of the early Byzantine Empire, as causing the freedom of conscience that had been the major benchmark set by the Edict of Milan to be fully abolished.

Before the 800s, the 'Bishop of Rome' had no special influence over other bishops outside of Rome, and had not yet manifested as the central ecclesiastical power. There were regional versions of Christianity accepted by local clergy that it's probable the papacy would not have approved of – if they had been informed. From the late seventh to the middle of the eighth century, eleven of the thirteen men who held the position of Roman Pope were the sons of families from the East, and before they could be installed, these Popes had to be approved by the head of State, the Byzantine emperor.

The union of church and state buoyed the power and influence of both, but the Byzantine papacy, along with losses to Islam, and corresponding changes within Christianity itself, put an end to Ancient Christianity. Most scholars agree the 7th and 8th centuries are when the 'end of the ancient world' is most conclusive and well documented. Christianity transformed into its medieval forms as exemplified by the creation of the Papal state, and the alliance between the papacy and the militant Frankish king Charlemagne.

With the formation of the Papal State, the emperor's properties came into the possession of the bishop of Rome, and that is when conversions of temples into churches truly began in earnest. According to Schuddeboom, "With the sole exception of the Pantheon, all known temple conversions in the city of Rome date from the time of the Papal State". Scholarship has been divided over whether this represents Christianization as a general effort to demolish the pagan past, or was simple pragmatism, or perhaps an attempt to preserve the past's art and architecture, or some combination.

== Mathematical modelling ==
Demographer John D. Durand describes two types of population estimates: benchmarks derived from data at a given time, and estimates that can be carried forward or backward between such benchmarks. Reliability of each varies based on the quality of the data. Romans were "inveterate census takers," but few of their records remain. Durand says historians have pieced together the fragments of census statistics that still exist "with such historical and archaeological data as reported size of armies, quantities of grain shipments and distributions, areas of cities, and indications of the extent and intensity of cultivation of lands".

Sociologists Rodney Stark and Keith Hopkins have estimated an average compounded annual rate of growth for early Christianity that, in reality, would have varied up and down and region by region. Ancient historian Adam Schor writes that "Stark applied formal models to early Christian material... [describing] early Christianity as an organized but open movement, with a distinct social boundary, and a set kernel of doctrine. The result, he argued, was consistent conversion and higher birth rates, leading to exponential growth." Stark states a 3.4% growth rate compounded annually while Keith Hopkins uses what he calls "parametric probability" to reach 3.35%.

Art historian Robert Couzin, who specializes in Early Christianity, has studied numbers of Christian sarcophagi in Rome. He has written that "more sophisticated mathematical models (for the shape of the expansion curve) could affect certain assumptions, but not the general tendency of the numerical hypotheses".

Classical scholar Roger S. Bagnall found that, by isolating Christian names of sons and their fathers, he could trace the growth of Christianity in Roman Egypt. While Bagnall cautions about extrapolating from his work to the rest of the Roman Empire, Stark writes that a comparison of the critical years 239–315 shows a correlation of 0.86 between Stark's own projections for the overall empire and Bagnall's research on Egypt.

Though the reliability of population numbers remains open to question, Garry Runciman, historical sociologist, has written that "It seems agreed by all the standard authorities that during the course of the third century there was a significant rise, unquantifiable as it is bound to be, in the absolute number of Christians".

== Possible reasons for a top-down spread ==
=== Traditional conflict models ===
According to Bagnall, the story of the rise of Christianity has traditionally been told in terms of contest and conflict ending Roman paganism in the late fourth and early fifth centuries. Recent scholarship has produced large amounts of data, with modern computer technology providing the ability to analyze it, leading to the view that paganism did not end in the late fourth century. There are many signs that a healthy paganism continued into the fifth century, and in some places, into the sixth and beyond. Archaeology indicates that in most regions the decline of paganism was slow, gradual and untraumatic.

=== Violence and temple destruction ===
Peter Brown writes that much of the previous framework for understanding Late Antiquity has been based on the dramatized "tabloid-like" accounts of the destruction of the Serapeum of Alexandria in 391, its supposed connection to the murder of Hypatia, and the application of the Theodosian law code. Written historical sources are filled with episodes of conflict, yet events in late antiquity were often dramatized by both pagans and Christians for their own ideological reasons. The language of the Code parallels that of the late fourth and early fifth century Christian apologists in Roman–style rhetoric of conquest and triumph. For many earlier historians, this created the impression of on–going violent conflict between pagans and Christians on an empire-wide scale with the destruction of the Serapeum being only one example of many temples having been destroyed by Christians.

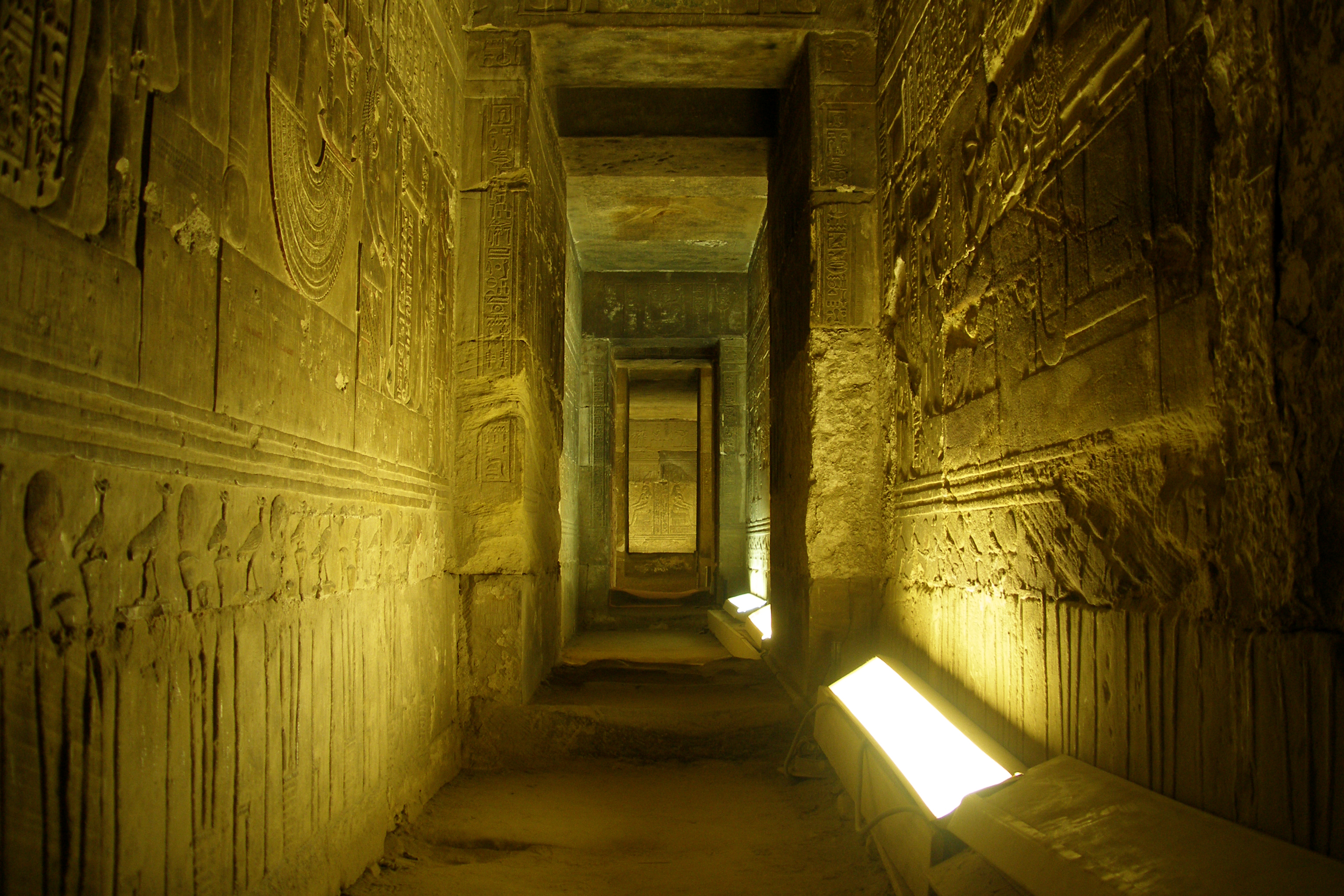
Temple of Hathor, Dark interior, Dendera, Egypt. Original construction is estimated at the 1st century BC with subsequent additions in Roman times. The temple is one of the well preserved temples in Egypt.

New archaeological research has revealed that the Serapeum was the only temple destroyed in this period in Egypt. Classicist Alan Cameron writes that the Roman temples in Egypt "are among the best preserved in the ancient world". Temple destruction is attested to in 43 cases in the written sources, but only four have been confirmed by archaeological evidence. (Note: Archaeologists Lavan and Mulryan write that earthquakes, civil conflict and external invasions caused much of the temple destruction of this era. The Roman economy of the third and fourth centuries struggled, and traditional polytheism was expensive and dependent upon donations from the state and private elites. Roger S. Bagnall reports that imperial financial support declined markedly after Augustus. Lower budgets meant the physical decline of urban structures of all types. This progressive decay was accompanied by an increased trade in salvaged building materials, as the practice of recycling became common in Late Antiquity.) Recent scholarship has become that Hypatia's murder was largely political and probably occurred in 415 not 391. There is no evidence that the harsh penalties of the anti-sacrifice laws were ever enforced.

Some of the most influential textual sources on pagan-Christian violence concerns Martin, Bishop of Tours (c. 371–397), the Pannonian ex-soldier who is, as Salzman describes, "solely credited in the historical record as the militant converter of Gaul". The portion of the sources devoted to attacks on pagans is limited, and they all revolve around Martin using his miraculous powers to overturn pagan shrines and idols but not to ever threaten or harm people. Salzman concludes that "None of Martin's interventions led to the deaths of any Gauls, pagan or Christian. Even if one doubts the exact veracity of these incidents, the assertion that Martin preferred non-violent conversion techniques says much about the norms for conversion in Gaul" in 398 when Sulpicius Severus, who knew Martin, wrote Martin's biography.

In a comparative study of levels of violence in Roman society, German ancient historian Martin Zimmermann, concludes there was no increase in the level of violence in the Empire in Late Antiquity. Acts of violence had always been an aspect of Roman society, but they were isolated and rare. Archaeologist David Riggs writes that evidence from North Africa reveals a tolerance of religious pluralism and a vitality of traditional paganism much more than it shows any form of religious violence or coercion: "persuasion, such as the propagation of Christian apologetics, appears to have played a more critical role in the eventual "triumph of Christianity" than was previously assumed".

The Oxford Handbook of Late Antiquity says that "Torture and murder were not the inevitable result of the rise of Christianity." There were a few ugly incidents of local violence, but there was also a fluidity in the boundaries between the communities and what Salzman describes as "coexistence with a competitive spirit." In most regions of the Empire, pagans were simply ignored. Current evidence indicates "Jewish communities also enjoyed a century of stable, even privileged, existence" says Brown. Jan N. Bremmer has written that recent evidence shows "religious violence in Late Antiquity is mostly restricted to violent rhetoric: 'in Antiquity, not all religious violence was that religious, and not all religious violence was that violent'."

As a result, the conflict model has become marginalized in the twenty first century. According to historian Raymond Van Dam, "an approach which emphasizes conflict flounders as a means for explaining both the initial attractions of a new cult like Christianity, as well as, more importantly, its persistence". Archaeologists Luke Lavan and Michael Mulryan of the Centre for Late Antique Archaeology indicate that archaeology does not show evidence of widespread conflict. Historian Michelle Renee Salzman writes that, in light of current scholarship, violence can not be seen as a central factor in explaining the spread of Christianity in the western empire.

=== Socio-economic factors ===
Some innate characteristics of Roman Empire contributed to Christianization: travel was made easier by universal currency, laws, relative internal security and the good roads of the empire. Religious syncretism, Roman political culture, a common language, and Hellenist philosophy made Christianization easier than in places like Persia or China. Judaism was also important to the spread of Christianity; evidence clearly shows the Diaspora communities were where Christians gave many of their earliest sermons.

The fourth century developed new forms of status and wealth that included moving away from the old silver standard. Brown says Constantine consolidated loyalty at the top through his spectacular generosity, paying his army and his high officials in gold and thereby flooding the economy with gold. The imperial bureaucracy soon began demanding that taxes also be paid in gold. This created multiple problems.

"The fourth century scramble for gold ensured that the rural population was driven hard" says Brown. Eighty percent of the population provided the labor to harvest 60% of the empire's wealth, most of which was garnered by the wealthy. This contributed to unrest. Constantine reached out to the provincial elite for help with unrest and other problems, enlarging the Senate's membership from about 600 to over 2,000. This also contributed to unrest and change as the novi homines ("new men", first in their family to serve in the Roman Senate) were more willing to accept religious change. In response to all of this, bishops became intercessors in society, lobbying the powerful to practice Christian benevolence. After 370/380, wealth and cultural prestige began moving toward the Catholics.

=== Influence of legislation ===
In 429, Emperor Theodosius II (r. 402 – 450) ordered that all of the laws, from the reign of Constantine up to himself and Valentinian III, be found and codified. For the next nine years, twenty-two scholars, working in two teams, dug through archives and assembled, edited and amended empirical law into 16 books containing more than 2,500 constitutions issued between 313 and 437. It was published as the Theodosian Code in 438. The code covers political, socioeconomic, and cultural subjects with religious laws in Book 16.

Constantine and his descendants used law to grant "imperial patronage, legal rights to hold property, and financial assistance" to the church, thereby making important contributions to its success over the next hundred years. Laws that favored Christianity increased the church's status which was all important for the elites. Constantine had tremendous personal popularity and support, even amongst the pagan aristocrats, prompting some individuals to become informed about their emperor's religion. This passed along through aristocratic kinship and friendship networks and patronage ties. Emperors who modeled Christianity's moral appeal with aristocratic honor, combined with laws that made Christianity attractive to the aristocratic class, led to the conversion of the aristocracy beginning in the 360s under Gratian.

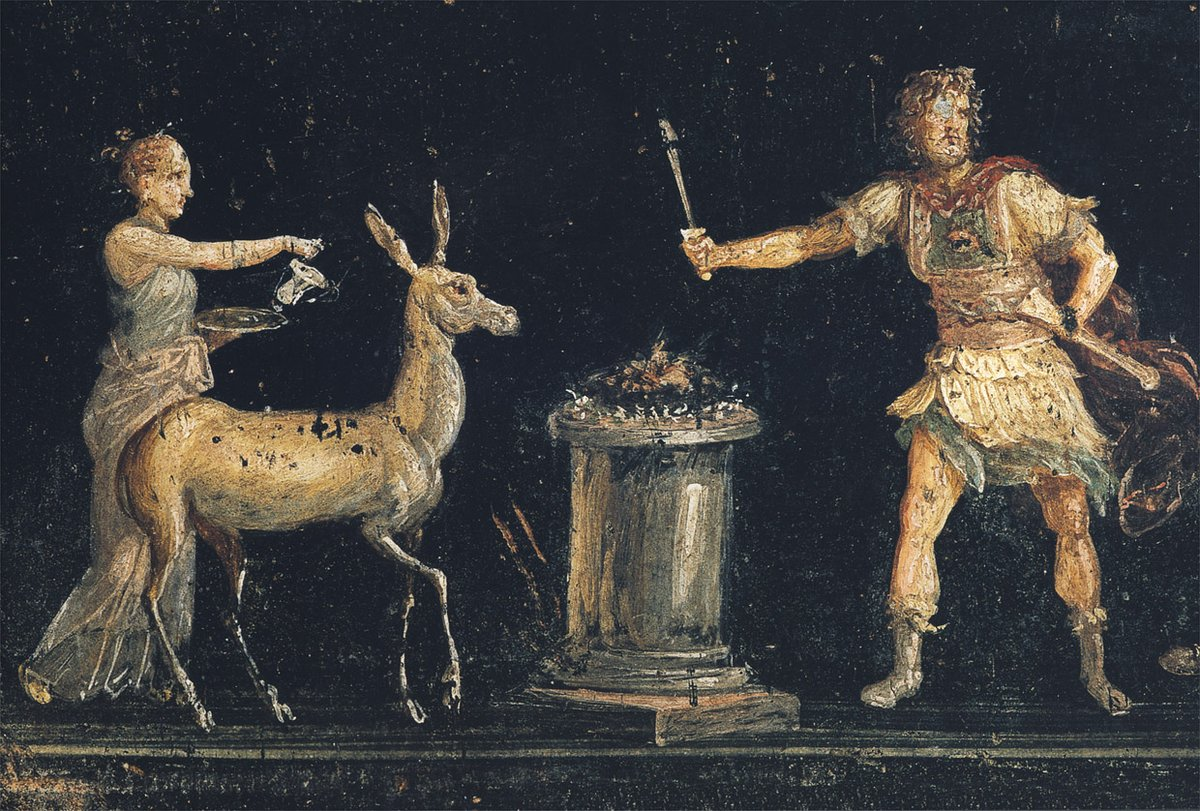
Sacrifice in honour of the goddess Diana, first century wall-painting. House of the Vettii in Pompeii

The Imperial laws collected in Chapter 10, Book XVI of the Theodosian Code provide important evidence of the intent of Christian emperors to promote Christianity, eliminate the practice of sacrifice and control magic. While it is difficult to date with any confidence any of the laws in the Code to the time of Constantine a century earlier, most scholars agree that Constantine issued the first law banning paganism's public practice of animal sacrifice. Blood sacrifice of animals (or people) was the element of pagan culture most abhorrent to Christians, though Christian emperors often tolerated other pagan practices. Brown notes that the language of the anti-sacrifice laws "was uniformly vehement", and the "penalties they proposed were frequently horrifying", evidencing the intent of "terrorizing" the populace into accepting the absence of public sacrifice being imposed by law.

However, the Code does not have the ability to tell how, or if, these policies were actually carried out. There is no record of anyone in Constantine's era being executed for sacrificing, nor is there evidence of any of the horrific punishments ever being enacted. Imperial commands provided magistrates with a license to act, but those magistrates chose how, or whether to act, for themselves, according to local circumstances. Legal anthropologist Caroline Humfress says the idea of "an empire-wide 'legal system' being imposed from above" before Justinian does not accurately reflect the social and legal realities of the earlier centuries of the Roman Empire. Humfress writes that Roman imperial law, though not irrelevant, was not a determining factor in Roman society before the sixth century.

Sacrifices continued to be performed privately, in the home, and in the country away from the imperial court, but the public ritual killing of animals seems to have largely disappeared from civic festivals by the time of Julian (361 to 363). Evidence for public sacrifices in Constantinople and Antioch altogether runs out by the end of the fourth century. Bradbury states that the complete disappearance of public sacrifice "in many towns and cities must be attributed to the atmosphere created by imperial and episcopal hostility".

Paganism in a broader sense did not end when public sacrifice did. Brown says polytheists were accustomed to offering prayers to the gods in many ways and places that did not include sacrifice: at healing springs, in caves, in deep woods, with lights, dancing, feasting and clouds of incense. "Pollution" was only associated with sacrifice, and the ban on sacrifice had fixed boundaries and limits. The end of sacrifice led to the birth of new pagan practices such as adding Neoplatonic theurgy to philosophical practices like stoicism. Pagan religions also directly transformed themselves over the next two centuries by adopting some Christian practices and ideas. Paganism thereby continued up through the sixth century with still existing centers of paganism in Athens, Gaza, Alexandria, and elsewhere.

== Possible reasons for a grassroots spread ==
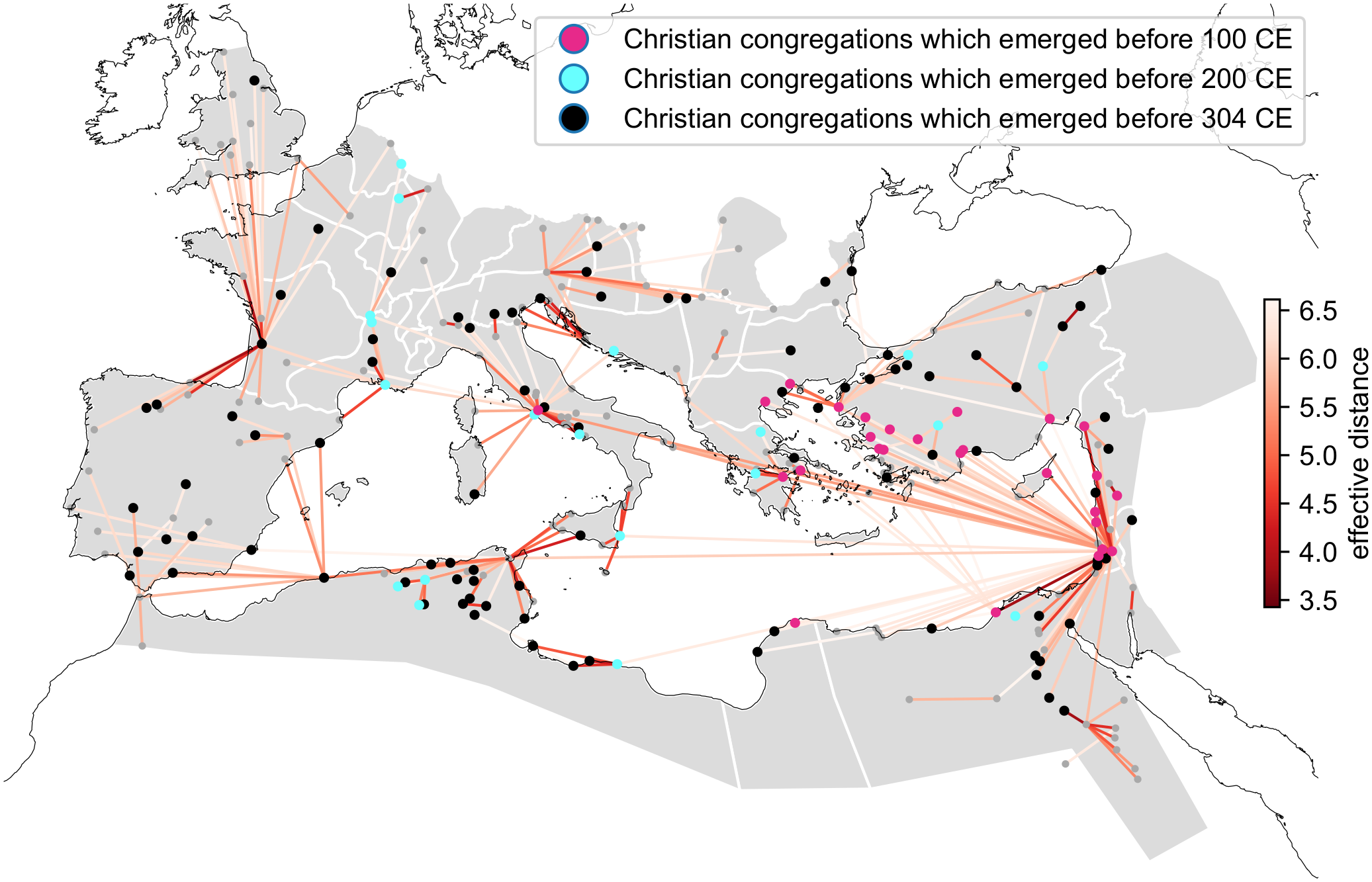
Progress of growth: lines show which congregations developed other congregations, when, and where

This approach sees the cultural and religious change of the early Roman Empire as the cumulative result of multiple individual behaviors. When one person learned what constituted Christian self-identification from another person, adopting and imitating that for themselves, the societal transformation called "Christianization" emerged naturally.

Peter Brown writes that the emergence of ethical monotheism in a polytheistic world was the single most crucial change made in a Late Antique culture experiencing many changes. The content of Christianity was at the center of this age, Brown adds, contributing to both a "behavioral revolution" and a "cognitive revolution" which then changed the "moral texture of the late Roman world".

A minority has argued that moral differences between pagans and Christians were not real differences. For example, Ramsay MacMullen has written that any real moral differences would need to be observable in Roman society at large, and he says there were none that were, offering as examples Christian failure to make any observable impact on the practice of slavery, increasingly cruel judicial penalties, corruption and the gladiatorial shows.

Runciman writes that recent research has shown it was the formal unconditional altruism of early Christianity that accounted for much of its early success. Sociologist E. A. Judge cites the powerful combination of new ideas, and the social impact of the church together creating the central pivotal point for the religious conversion of Rome.

=== New ideas ===
==== Inclusivity and exclusivity ====
Ancient Christianity was unhindered by either ethnic or geographical ties; it was open to being experienced as a new start, for both men and women, rich and poor; baptism was free, there were no fees, and it was intellectually egalitarian, making philosophy and ethics available to ordinary people who might not even have known how to read. Many scholars see this inclusivity as the primary reason for Christianity's success.

Historian Raymond Van Dam says conversion produced a new way of thinking and believing that involved "a fundamental reorganization in the ways people thought about themselves and others". Christianity embraced all, including "sinners"; the term for sinner (Ancient Greek: αμαρτωλοί), meaning the immoral, is a Greek term for those 'on the outside'. Its use was undermined by Jesus. Jesus did not classify everyone as sinners, but he did call for those who considered themselves insiders to repent. Paul extended the term's application to everyone, arguing that everyone is an outsider who can become an insider.

A key characteristic of these inclusive communities was their unique type of exclusivity which used belief to construct identity and social boundaries. Believing was the crucial and defining characteristic of membership; it set a "high boundary" that strongly excluded the "unbeliever". Bible scholar Paul Raymond Trebilco says that these high boundaries were set without social distancing or vilification of the outsiders themselves, since context reveals "a clear openness to these 'outsiders' and a strong 'other regard' for them". Strong boundaries for insiders, and openness to outsiders as possible converts, are both held in very real tension in New Testament and early patristic writings. However, the early Christian had exacting moral standards that included avoiding contact with those that were seen as still "in bondage to the Evil One": (2 Corinthians 6:1–18; 1 John 2: 15–18; Revelation 18: 4; II Clement 6; Epistle of Barnabas, 1920). According to Philosopher and philologist Danny Praet, the exclusivity of Christian monotheism formed an important part of its success enabling it to maintain its independence in a society that syncretized religion. He adds that this gave Christianity the powerful psychological attraction of elitism.

==== Kerygma (central message) ====
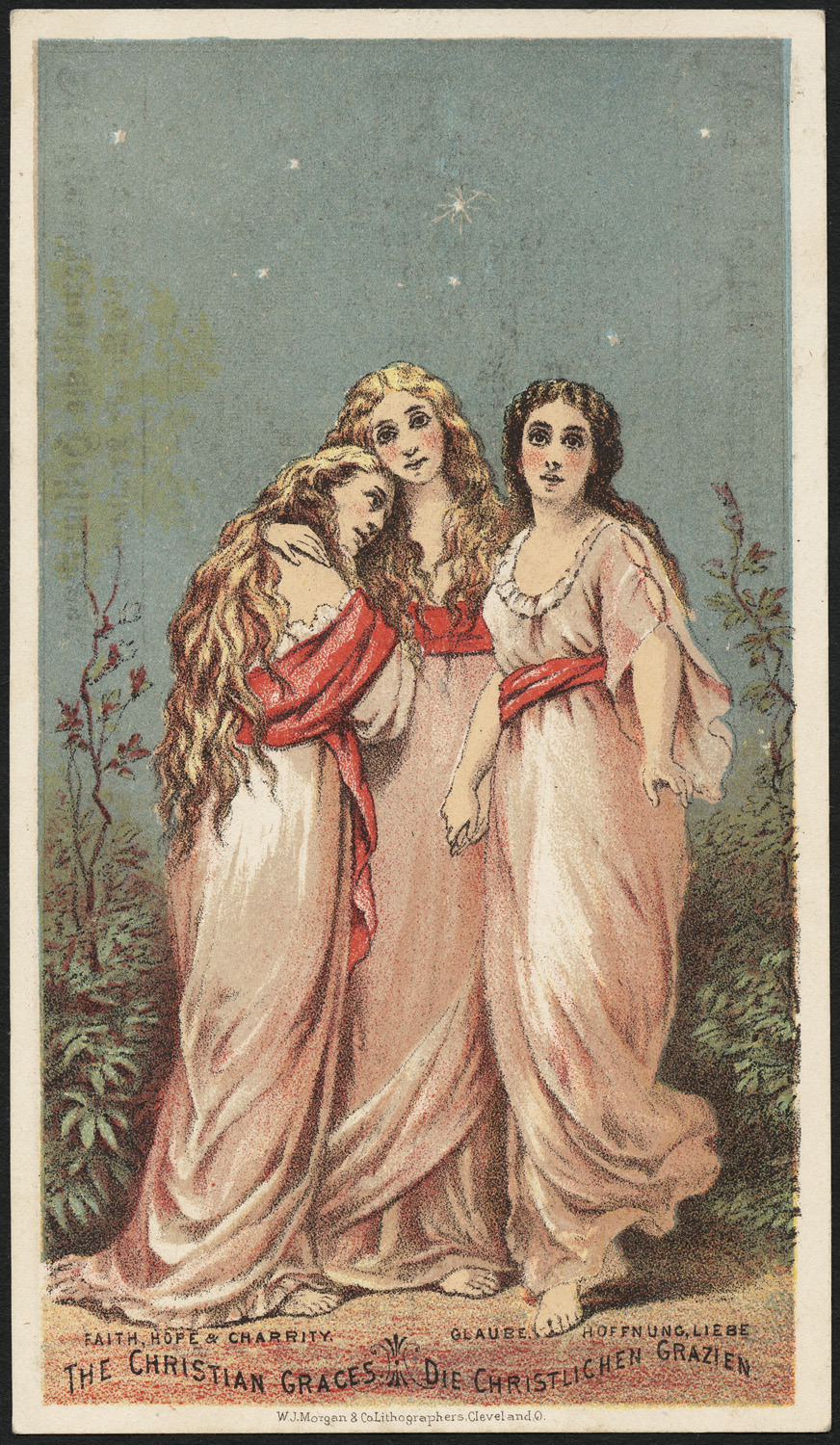
The Christian Graces, Faith, Hope & Charity. 19th century trade card

According to Greek scholar Matthew R. Malcolm, central to the kerygma is the concept that the power of God is manifested through Jesus in a reversal of power. In the gospel of Matthew (20:25–26) Jesus is quoted as saying: "You know that the rulers of the Gentiles lord it over them, and their high officials exercise authority over them. Not so with you. Instead, whoever wants to become great among you must be a servant..." Biblical scholar Wayne Meeks has written that: "the ultimate power and structure of the universe" [God] has manifested itself in human society through Jesus' act of giving up his power for the sake of love. This reversal has impact on all aspects of the message: it redefines love as an "other-regarding sacrificial act", and it redefines the nature and practice of power and authority as service to others. Meeks concludes "this must have had a very powerful, emotional appeal to people".

This included a "conscious dismantling of [Roman] concepts of hierarchy and power". From the beginning, the Pauline communities cut across the social ranks. Paul's understanding of the innate paradox of an all powerful Christ dying as a powerless man created a new social order unprecedented in classical society. New Testament scholar N. T. Wright argues that these ideas were revolutionary to the classical world.

This message contained the assertion that Christian salvation was made available to all, and it included eternal life, but not for the unbeliever. Ancient paganism had a variety of views of an afterlife from a belief in Hades to a denial of eternal life completely. Afterlife punishments can be found in other religions preceding Christianity. One scholar has concluded "Hell is a Greek invention". Praet says that much of the Roman population no longer believed in Graeco–Roman afterlife punishments, so there is no reason to expect they would take the Christian version more seriously. While it may or may not have been a major cause of conversion, writings from the Christians Justin and Tatian, the pagan Celsus, and the Passio of Ptolemaeus and Lucius are just some of the sources that confirm Christians did use the doctrine of eternal punishment, and that it did persuade some non-believers to convert.

The Christian teaching of bodily resurrection was new, (and not readily accepted), but most Christian views of an afterlife were not new. What they had was the novelty of exclusivity: right belief became as significant a determiner of the future as right behavior. Ancient Christians backed this up with prophecies from ages old documents and living witnesses, giving Christianity its claim to a historical base. This was new and different from paganism. Praet writes that anti-Christian polemics of the era never questioned that: "[Jesus'] birth, teachings, death and resurrection took place in the reigns of the emperors Augustus and Tiberius, and until the end of the first century, the ancient church could produce living witnesses who claimed to have seen or spoken to the Savior". Many modern scholars have seen this historical base as one of the major reasons for Christianity's success.

=== Social practices ===
==== Women ====
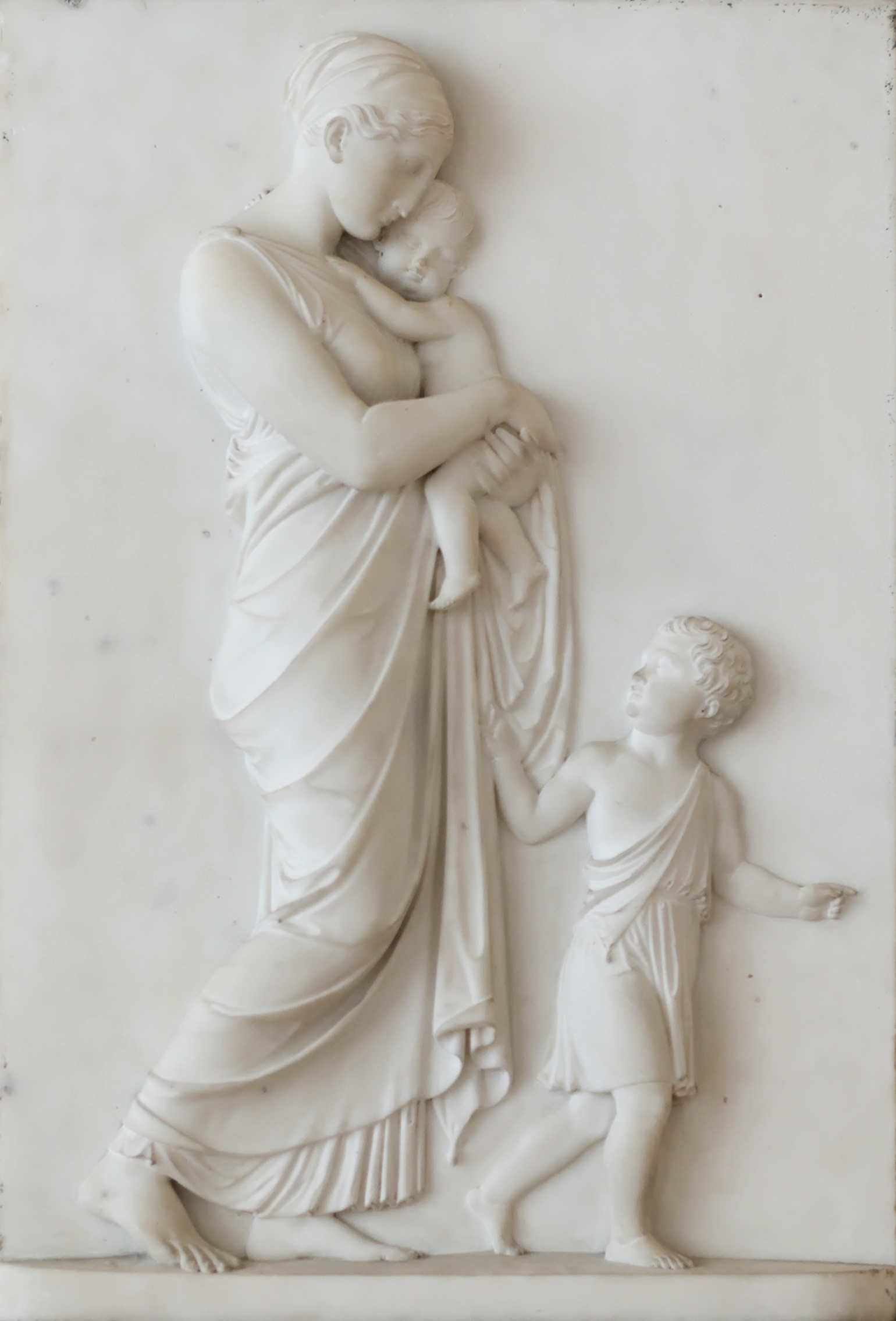
Christian charity, 19th century work by Bertel Thorvaldsen

It has, for many years, been one of the axioms of scholars of early Christianity that significant numbers of women composed its earliest members. Theologian and historian Judith Lieu writes that the presence of large numbers of female converts within Christianity is not statistically documented. Pagan writers wrote polemics criticizing the attraction of women to Christianity along with the uneducated masses, children, and "thieves, burglars and poisoners", but Lieu describes this as politically motivated rhetoric that cannot be depended upon to prove the presence of large numbers of women. Lieu also notes that, "No Christian source explicitly celebrates the number of women joining their ranks".

Art historian Janet Tulloch says that "Unlike the early Christian literary tradition, in which women are largely invisible, misrepresented, or omitted entirely, female figures in early Christian art play significant roles in the transmission of the faith". Feminist theologian Elisabeth Schüssler Fiorenza wrote in her seminal work In Memory of Her: a Feminist Theological Reconstruction of Christian Origins that many of Jesus' followers were women. The Pauline epistles in the New Testament provide some of the earliest documentary sources of women as true missionary partners in expanding the Jesus movement.

In the church rolls from the second century, there is conclusive evidence of groups of women "exercising the office of widow". Historian Geoffrey Nathan says that "a widow in Roman society who had lost her husband and did not have money of her own was at the very bottom of the social ladder". The church provided practical support to those who would, otherwise, have been in destitute circumstances, and this "was in all likelihood an important factor in winning new female members".

Professor of religious studies at Brown University, Ross Kraemer, argues that Christianity offered women of this period a new sense of worth. Lieu affirms that women of note were attracted to Christianity as evidenced in the Acts of the Apostles, where mention is made of Lydia, the seller of purple at Philippi, and of other noble women at Thessalonica, Berea and Athens ( 17.4, 12, 33–34). Lieu writes that, "In parts of the Empire, influential women were able to use religion to negotiate a role for themselves in society that existing conceptual frameworks did not legitimate". As classics scholar Moses Finley writes, "there is no mistaking the fact that Homer fully reveals what remained true for the whole of antiquity: that women were held to be naturally inferior."

There is some evidence of disruption of traditional women's roles in some of the mystery cults, such as Cybele, but there is no evidence this went beyond the internal practices of the religion itself. The mysteries created no alternative in larger society to the established patterns. There is no evidence of any effort in Second Temple Judaism to harmonize the roles or standing of women with that of men. The Roman Empire was an age of awareness of the differences between male and female. Social roles were not taken for granted. They were debated, and this was often done with some misogyny. Paul uses a basic formula of reunification of opposites, (Galatians 3:28; 1 Corinthians 12:13; Colossians 3:11) to simply wipe away such social distinctions. In speaking of slave/free, male/female, Greek/Jew, circumcised/uncircumcised, and so on, he states that "all" are "one in Christ" or that "Christ is all". This became part of the message of the early church and the practice of the Pauline communities.

Having their female (and imperfect male) babies taken from them and exposed, was an accepted fact of Roman life for most women. In 1968, J. Lindsay reported that even in large families "more than one daughter was practically never reared." There was also a high mortality rate among women due to childbirth and abortion. Elizabeth Castelli writes: "The ascetic life, especially the monastic life, may have provided women with a mode of escape from the rigors and dangers of married and maternal existence, with the prospect of an education and (in some cases) an intellectual life, and with access to social and economic power that would otherwise have eluded them".

Judith Lieu cautions that there is "good reason for rejecting a model that understands women's attraction to early Christianity... purely in terms of 'what it did for them'." A survey of the literature of the early period shows female converts as having one thing in common: that of being in danger. Women took real risks to spread the gospel. Ordinary women moved in and out of houses and shops and marketplaces, took the risk of speaking out and leading people, including children, outside the bounds of the "proper authorities". This is evident in the sanctions and labels their antagonists used against them. Power resided with the male authority figure, and he had the right to label any uncooperative female in his household as insane or possessed, to exile her from her home, and condemn her to prostitution. Kraemer theorizes that "Against such vehement opposition, the language of the ascetic forms of Christianity must have provided a strong set of validating mechanisms", attracting large numbers of women.

==== Sexual morality ====
Both the ancient Greeks and the Romans cared and wrote about sexual morality within categories of good and bad, pure and defiled, and ideal and transgression. These ethical structures were built on the Roman understanding of social status. Slaves were not thought to have an interior ethical life because they had no status; they could go no lower socially. They were commonly used sexually, while the free and well-born who used them were thought to embody social honor and the ability to exhibit the fine sense of shame and sexual modesty suited to their station. Sexual modesty meant something different for men than it did for women, and for the well-born, than it did for the poor, and for the free citizen, than it did for the slave — for whom the concepts of honor, shame and sexual modesty were said to have no meaning at all.

In the ancient Roman Empire, "shame" was a profoundly social concept that was always mediated by gender and status. "It was not enough that a wife merely regulate her sexual behavior in the accepted ways; it was required that her virtue in this area be conspicuous." Men, on the other hand, were allowed sexual freedoms such as live-in mistresses and sex with slaves. This duality permitted Roman society to find both a husband's control of a wife's sexual behavior a matter of intense importance, and at the same time see that same husband's sex with young slave boys as of little concern.

The Greeks and Romans said humanity's deepest moralities depended upon social position which was given by fate; Christians advocated the "radical notion of individual freedom centered around ... complete sexual agency". Paul the Apostle and his followers taught that "the body was a consecrated space, a point of mediation between the individual and the divine". This meant the ethical obligation for sexual self-control was to God, and it was placed on each individual, male and female, slave and free, equally, in all communities, regardless of status. It was "a revolution in the rules of behavior, but also in the very image of the human being". In the Pauline epistles, porneia was a single name for the array of sexual behaviors outside marital intercourse. This became a defining concept of sexual morality. Such a shift in definition utterly transformed "the deep logic of sexual morality".

==== Care for the poor ====
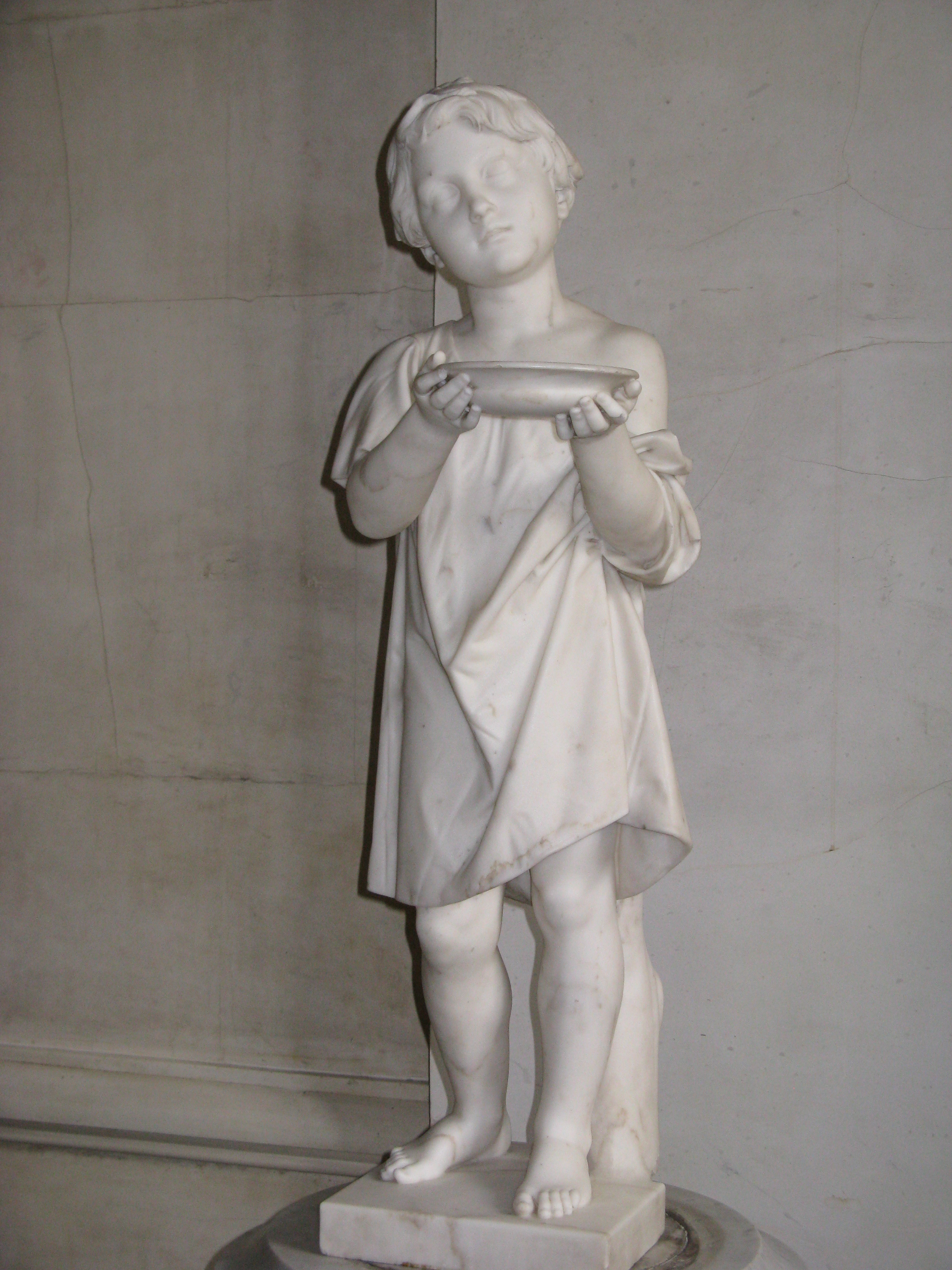
Charity, 19th century sculpture by Christian Daniel Rauch

Professor of religion Steven C. Muir has written that "Charity was, in effect, an institutionalized policy of Christianity from its beginning. ... While this situation was not the sole reason for the group's growth, it was a significant factor". Christians showed the poor great generosity, and "there is no disputing that Christian charity was an ideology put into practice". (Note: Robin Lane Fox provides examples. In the 250's, it was Christian groups and not the pagan cities which undertook collections to ransom their members from barbarian captors. During the siege of Alexandria in 262 CE, two Christian leaders arranged to rescue many Christian and pagan people who were old and weak. During the great famine of 311–312 CE, rich pagan donors gave at first, but then withheld funds fearing they themselves would become poor. Christians, on the other hand, offered last rites to the dying, buried them, and distributed bread to all others suffering from hunger.) Prior to Christianity, the wealthy elite of Rome mostly donated to civic programs designed to elevate their status, though personal acts of kindness to the poor were not unheard of. Salzman writes that the Roman practice of civic euergetism ("philanthropy publicly directed toward one's city or fellow citizens") influenced Christian charity "even as they remained distinct components of justifications for the feeding of Rome well into the late sixth century". (Note: Christian and non-Christian witnesses testify to the zealousness of Christian communities for almsgiving and charity. "That the later church in Rome was actively involved in charity and renowned for its work with the needy is attested". For Chrysostom, almsgiving was an act of "continued redemption" first offered by "the historical Jesus on the cross, and now in the present through the poor. To approach the poor with mercy was to receive mercy from Christ". Hart writes that the emperor Julian, who was hostile to Christianity, is recorded as saying: "It is [the Christians'] philanthropy towards strangers, the care they take of the graves of the dead, and the affected sanctity with which they conduct their lives that have done most to spread their atheism.")

==== Health care ====
Two devastating epidemics, the Antonine Plague in 154 and the Plague of Cyprian in 251, killed a large number of the empire's population, though there is some debate over how many. Graeco-Roman doctors tended largely to the elite, while the poor mostly had recourse to "miracles and magic" at religious temples. Christians, on the other hand, tended to the sick and dying, as well as the aged, orphaned, exiled and widowed. Many of these caretakers were monks and nuns. Christian monasticism had emerged toward the end of the third century, and their numbers grew such that, "by the fifth century, monasticism had become a dominant force impacting all areas of society".

The monastic health care system was innovative in its methods, allowing the sick to remain within the monastery as a special class afforded special benefits and care. This destigmatized illness and legitimized the deviance from the norm that sickness includes. This formed the basis for future public health care. According to Albert Jonsen, a historian of medicine, "the second great sweep of medical history [began] at the end of the fourth century, with the founding of the first Christian hospital for the poor at Caesarea in Cappadocia." (Note: After the death of Eusebius in 370 and the election of Basil as bishop of Caesarea, the new bishop established the early church's first formal soup kitchen, hospital, homeless shelter, hospice, poorhouse, orphanage, reform center for thieves, women's center for those leaving prostitution and many other ministries. Basil was personally involved and invested in the projects and process, giving all of his personal wealth to fund the ministries. Basil himself would put on an apron and work in the soup kitchen. These ministries were given freely regardless of religious affiliation. Basil refused to make any discrimination when it came to people who needed help saying that "the digestive systems of the Jew and the Christian are indistinguishable.") By the fifth century, the founding of hospitals for the poor had become common for bishops, abbots and abbesses. Koester argues that the success of Christianity is not simply in its message; "one has to see it also in the consistent and very well thought out establishment of institutions to serve the needs of the community".

==== Community ====
According to Stark, "Christianity did not grow because of miracle working in the marketplaces ... or because Constantine said it should, or even because the martyrs gave it such credibility. It grew because Christians constituted an intense community" which provided a unique "sense of belonging". Praet has written that, "in his very influential booklet Pagans and Christians in an Age of Anxiety, E. R. Dodds acknowledged ... 'Christians were in a more than formal sense 'members one of another': [Dodds thinks] that was a major cause, perhaps the strongest single cause, of the spread of Christianity".

Christian community was not just one thing. Experience and expression were diverse. Yet early Christian communities did have commonalities in the kerygma (the message), the rites of baptism and the eucharist. As far back as it can be traced, evidence indicates the rite of initiation into Christianity was always baptism. In Christianity's earliest communities, candidates for baptism were introduced by a teacher or other person willing to stand surety for their character and conduct. Baptism created a set of responsibilities within each Christian community, which some authors described in quite specific terms. Candidates for baptism were instructed in the major tenets of the faith (the kerygma), examined for moral living, sat separately in worship, could not receive the eucharist, and were generally expected to demonstrate commitment to the community and obedience to Christ's commands before being accepted into the community as a full member.

Celebration of the eucharist was the common unifier for Christian communities, and early Christians believed the kerygma, the eucharist and baptism came directly from Jesus of Nazareth. According to Dodds, "A Christian congregation was from the first a community in a much fuller sense than any corresponding group of Isis followers or Mithras devotees. Its members were bound together not only by common rites but by a common way of life".

According to New Testament professor Joseph Hellerman, New Testament writers choose 'family' as the central social metaphor to describe their community, and by doing so, they redefined the concept of family. In both Jewish and Roman tradition, genetic families were generally buried together, but an important cultural shift took place in the way Christians buried one another: they gathered unrelated Christians into a common burial space, as if they really were one family, "commemorated them with homogeneous memorials and expanded the commemorative audience to the entire local community of coreligionists". The Jewish ethic and its concept of community as family is what made "Christianity's power of attraction ... not purely religious but also social and philosophical". The Christian church was modeled on the synagogue. Christian philosophers synthesized their own views with Semitic monotheism and Greek thought. The Old Testament gave the new religion of Christianity roots reaching back to antiquity. In a society which equated dignity and truth with tradition, this was significant.

Community on a larger scale is evidenced by a study of 'letters of recommendation' that Christians created to be taken by a traveler from one group of believers to another. Security and hospitality when traveling had traditionally been undependable for most, being ensured only by, and for, those with the wealth and power to afford them. By the late third and early fourth centuries, Christians had developed a 'form letter' of recommendation, only requiring the addition of an individual's name, that extended trust and welcome and safety to the whole household of faith, "though they were strangers". Sociologist E. A. Judge writes of the fourth century diary of Egeria which documents her travels throughout the Middle East, seeing the old sites of the Biblical period, the monks, and even climbing Mount Sinai: "At every point she was met and looked after". The same benefits were applied to others carrying a Christian letter of recommendation as members of the community.

==== Martyrdom ====
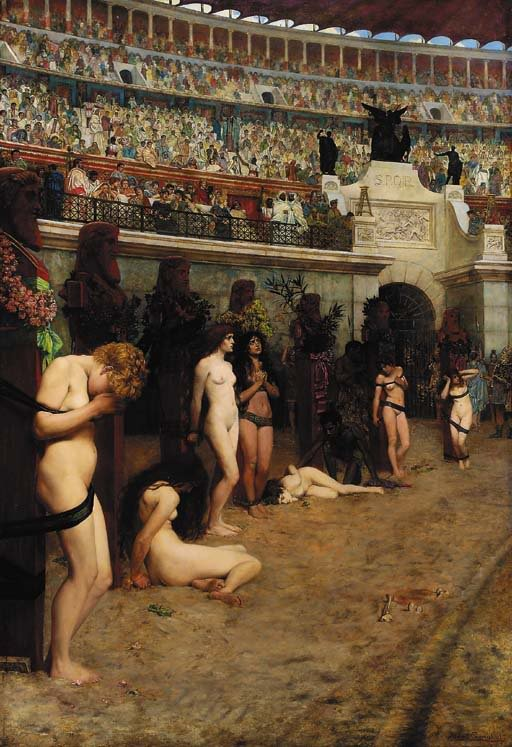
Faithful Unto Death by Herbert Schmalz, 19th century

The Roman government practiced systematic persecution of Christian leaders and their property in 250–51 under Decius, in 257–60 under Valerian, and expanded it after 303 under Diocletian. While it is understood by scholars that persecution did cause some apostasy and temporary setbacks in the numbers of Christians, the long term impact on Christian conversion was not negative. Peter Brown writes that "The failure of the Great Persecution of Diocletian was regarded as a confirmation of a long process of religious self-assertion against the conformism of a pagan empire." Persecution and suffering were seen by many at the time of these events, as well as by later generations of believers, as legitimizing the standing of the individual believers that died as well as legitimizing the ideology and authority of the church itself. Drake quotes Robert Markus: "The martyrs were, after the Apostles, the supreme representatives of the community of the faithful in God's presence. In them the communion of saints was most tangibly epitomized".

The result of this was summed up in the second century by Justin Martyr: "it is plain that, though beheaded and crucified, and thrown to wild beasts, and chains, and fire, and all other kinds of torture, we do not give up our confession [of Christ]; but the more such things happen, the more do others and in larger numbers become faithful, and worshippers of God through the name of Jesus". Keith Hopkins concludes that in the third century "in spite of temporary losses, Christianity grew fastest in absolute terms. In other words, in terms of number, persecution was good for Christianity".

==== Miracles ====
In the minority view, miracles and exorcisms form the most important (and possibly the only) reason for conversion to Christianity in the pre-Constantinian age. These events provide some of the best documented ancient conversions. However, there is a drop-off in the records of miracles in the crucial second and third centuries. Praet writes that "as early as the beginning of the third century, Christian authors admit that the "Golden Age" of miracles is over".

Yet, Christianity grew most rapidly at the end of that same third century indicating that the real impact of miracles in garnering new converts is questionable. In Praet's view, even if Christianity had "retained its miraculous powers", the impact of miracles on conversion would still be questionable, since pagans also produced miracles, and no one questioned that those miracles were as real as Christianity's.

== Alternative approaches ==
=== Network theory ===
Classical archaeologist and ancient historian Anna Collar chooses network theory for explaining the Christianization of the Roman Empire, saying: "it does not address why such changes take place, but it can help explain how change happened". Current studies in sociology and anthropology have shown that Christianity in its early centuries spread through its acquisition by one person from another by forming a distinct social network. Collar says that archaeological remains demonstrate that networks are formed wherever there are connections. When groups of people with different ways of life connect, interact, and exchange ideas and practices, "cultural diffusion" occurs. The more groups interact, the more cultural diffusion takes place. Diffusion is the primary method by which societies change; (it is distinct from colonialization which forces elements of a foreign culture into a society).

To understand patterns of development, social network theory treats society as a web of overlapping relationships and ties early Christian growth to its preexisting relationships. Adam M. Schor, a scholar of ancient Mediterranean history, discusses this: "Network theory aided Stark's research (with William Bainbridge) including the ground-breaking conclusion that almost all converts to modern religious groups have friendships or familial bonds with existing members. In fact, Stark used the network concept to back up his projections, positing that Christianity first grew along existing Jewish networks and existing links between Roman cities". Historian Paula Fredriksen says that it is "because of Diaspora Judaism, which is extremely well established [in the imperial age], that Christianity itself, as a new and constantly improvising form of Judaism, is able to spread as it does through the Roman world".

The kind of network formed by early Christian groups is what sociology calls a "modular scale-free network". This is a series of small "cells" that are associations of small groups of people, such as the early home churches in Ephesus and Caesaria, with popular leaders, (such as the Apostle Paul), who are the ones who hold together an otherwise unconnected small cluster of cells.

Network theory says that modular scale free networks are "robust": "they grow without central direction, but also survive most attempts to wipe them out." The third century saw the empire's greatest persecution of Christians while also being the critical century of church growth. Schor adds that "Persecutions (like Valerian's) might have thinned the Christian leadership without damaging the network's long-term growth capacity." Keith Hopkins attests that rapid growth in absolute numbers occurred only in the third and fourth centuries.

=== Psychology ===
Psychological explanations of Christianization are most often based on a belief that paganism declined during the imperial period causing an era of insecurity and anxiety. These anxious individuals were seen as the ones who sought refuge in religious communities which offered socialization. For most modern scholars, this view can no longer be maintained since traditional religion did not decline in this period, but remained into the sixth and seventh centuries, and there is no evidence of increased anxiety. Psychologist Pascal Boyer says a cognitive approach can account for the transmission of religious ideas and describe the processes whereby individuals acquire and transmit certain ideas and practices, but cognitive theory may not be sufficient to account for the social dynamics of religious movements, or the historical development of religious doctrines, which are not directly within its scope.

=== Evolution ===
This is grounded in a Neo-Darwinian theory of cultural selection. Empirical evidence indicates behaviors spread because people have a strong tendency to imitate their neighbors when they believe those neighbors are more successful. Anthropologists Robert Boyd and Peter J. Richerson write that Romans believed the early Christian community offered a better quality of life than the ordinary life available to most in the Roman Empire. Runciman writes of Christian altruism attracting pagans, yet also exposing the Christian groups to exploitation. It was care for the sick that primarily contributed to the spread of Christianity according to this view. Care-taking was particularly important during the severe epidemics of the Imperial period when some cities devolved into anarchy. Pagan society had weak traditions of mutual aid, whereas the Christian community had norms that created "a miniature welfare state in an empire which for the most part lacked social services". In Christian communities, care of the sick reduced mortality by, possibly, as much as two-thirds. Extant Christian and pagan sources indicate many conversions were the result of "the appeal of such aid". According to Runciman, a distinctly Christian phenotype of strong reciprocity and unconditional benevolence produced the growth of Christianity.

=== Diffusion of innovation ===
Diffusion of innovative ideas

This view combines an understanding of Christian ideology, and the utility of religion, with analysis of social networks and their environment. It focuses on the power of social interactions and how social groups communicate. In this theory, an innovation's success or failure is dependent upon the characteristics of the innovation itself, the adopters, what communication channels are used, time, and the social system in which it all happens. Ideology is always an aspect of religious innovation, but societal change is driven by the social networks formed by the people who follow the new religious innovation.

Religions adapt, adjust and change all the time, therefore a true religious innovation must be seen as a significant change – such as the shift from polytheism to monotheism – on a large scale. Collar argues that even though "the philosophical argument for one god was well known amongst the intellectual elite, ... monotheism can be called a religious innovation within the milieu of Imperial polytheism."

Having quickly begun moving outward from Jerusalem, all the largest cities in the empire had Christian congregations by the end of the first century. These became "hubs" for communicating the ongoing spread of the innovation. The variance in the times of when people responded creates a normal distribution curve. Collar writes, "there is a point on the curve that represents the crux of the diffusion process: the 'tipping point'. This 'tipping' takes place between 10 percent adoption and 20 percent adoption. Christianity achieved this tipping point between 150 and 250 when it moved from less than 50,000 adherents to over a million. This provided enough adopters for it to be self-sustaining and create further growth.

== Effects ==
=== Judicial penalties and clemency ===
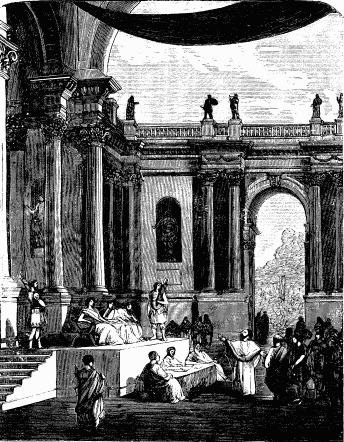
"Roman Hall of Justice", Young Folks' History of Rome, 1878

In 1986, Ramsay MacMullen wrote "What Difference did Christianity Make?" looking at the consequences of conversion rather than its causes. He has written that "Christianity made no difference"; or that it made a negative difference, saying that under the Christian emperors, judicial cruelty rose. MacMullen attributes this to Christian zeal and a belief in purgatory. On the one hand, this is problematic since, "Until the end of the twelfth century the noun purgatorium did not exist; the Purgatory had not yet been born" according to historian Jacques Le Goff. On the other hand, it is possible to identify a mounting severity in imperial criminal law. Classicist Peter Garnsey says this change takes place throughout the entire imperial period beginning under Augustus in the first century. Garnsey writes that increasing severity was the result of the political shift from a Republic to an autocratic empire.

Historian Jill Harries describes Roman justice as always harsh. It was a common belief of those in the Roman Empire that severity was a deterrent. As an example of this, Harries writes of the SC Silanianum, a particularly harsh law passed in AD 10. The SC Silanianum was originally aimed at slaves who murdered their masters, but its reach and its harshness grew as time passed. (Note: In the first and second centuries, the Roman Senate controlled the implementation of the SC Silanianum. Harries writes that: "The spectacle is not an edifying one. Little heed seems to have been paid to legal precision or to such residual human rights as slaves might still claim". Originally written to punish slaves who murdered their master, Senators extended the law's application to include all additional slaves who might have prevented it. The law was then extended again to include all slaves "resident under the same roof" at the time of a master's murder. According to Harries, the result was that "slaves who did nothing, and the murderer, faced the same penalty"; accordingly, 400 slaves were executed in 61 CE. The law's next expansion is the case of a probable suicide as recorded by Pliny the Younger (61 – c. 113). The Senate proceeded without knowing if a crime had been committed, and without waiting for the questioning to be completed, to address whether the dead man's freedmen were liable for 'failure to protect' along with his slaves. They determined that those 'under his roof', including all his freedmen, were liable for 'failure to protect' regardless of the circumstances of what had actually happened. Procedures designed to ensure that the proper processes of investigation, interrogation and conviction were carried out, in the right order, and punishment inflicted on the right people, seem to have been casually disregarded. Harries summarizes: "The absence of reflection or debate on the critical question concerning the rights of freed men is characteristic of court decisions that would later erode even the elite's immunities from judicial torture".)

On the one hand, increasingly harsh penalties for an ever enlarging number of capital crimes were published by emperors. On the other hand, emperors also wanted to be seen as generous in offering mercy and clemency. Beginning in the first century under Augustus, the established Roman understanding of clemency (clementia) began a transformation that was completed in the fourth century. Christian writers had embraced the concept of clemency and used it to express the mercy of God demonstrated in salvation, thereby combining the two concepts. The use of clementia to indicate forgiveness of wrongs and a mild merciful temper becomes common for writers of the Later Roman Empire.

Christianity did not grow outside Roman culture, it grew within it, ameliorating some of Rome's harsh justice and also adopting some of it. Augustine of Hippo advocated the harsh discipline of heretics that allowed some of the milder forms of physical torture. Augustine also urged the heretical Donatist bishop Donatus to practice Christian mildness when dealing with enemies. Augustine praised Marcellinus, who presided over an Imperial inquiry into the Catholic-Donatist controversy, for having conducted his investigation without using torture which was the norm. Ambrose, bishop of Milan, advised his correspondent Studius, a Christian judge, to show clemency, citing as a model Jesus' treatment of the adulteress. Garnsey has written that "Augustine, Ambrose, and other church leaders of progressive views clearly had a beneficent influence on the administration of the law, [but] it is evident that they did not attempt to promote a movement of penal reform, and did not conceive of such a movement". As Peter Brown has summarized: "When it came to the central functions of the Roman state, even the vivid Ambrose was a lightweight".

MacMullen cites Christian emperors as ceasing to use crucifixion and death by wild beasts as death penalties. Bishops, generally, opposed the death penalty. Such a penalty was consistent with the authority of the state, but it was inconsistent with the expansion of the Church through the conversion of its enemies. Arrests and punishments of heretics and all crimes against clergy were normally processed through the local bishop, and Augustine's correspondence after 405 contains many references to him using the bishop's right, and all his personal influence with Imperial officials, to intercede for those the state condemned. The State responded with the law of January 409 which made a "way the authorities could politely by-pass the 'bishop, the persuader of mercy' in arresting and punishing culprits".

=== Slavery ===
Early Christianity never openly called for the abolition of slavery, and while theologian G. François Wessels writes that it "must be conceded" that abolition was not a possibility in Paul's day, it must also be affirmed that many of the early Christians were slave owners who voiced no objection to the long–standing institution. Christians of Antiquity advised acceptance of what could not be changed, service to others with a loving attitude, and a focus on true freedom in Heaven. Their stated purpose was to change the heart of man, not the social order, and ancient Christians did not think of their movement in terms of social reform.

It is generally accepted that slavery began a decline in the second century which became more decisive as time passed, but this is usually attributed to economics rather than ideology as actual numbers of slaves necessary for comparison have not been established. However, there are ways in which it is likely Christianity did impact slavery.

The first can be seen in Paul's Epistle to Philemon, which indicates that Christianity worked to transform the slave-holding household to recognize Christian brotherhood and manumit (an established Roman practice of freeing slaves) accordingly. Wessels writes: "Onesimus, a slave, had run away from his master Philemon, but both had become Christians, and Paul sends Onesimus back home with a letter. In that letter Paul insists on Philemon's acceptance of Onesimus, no longer as a slave, but as a 'beloved brother'." Theologian Marianne Thompson has argued convincingly that "a reading of the letter to Philemon which views Paul as asking for Onesimus' spiritual reception as a brother in Christ, without the setting free of his body as a slave, assumes a 'dualistic anthropology' in Paul which his writings do not confirm". If the information in Colossians 4:7–9 is historical, the slave Onesimus was, accordingly, freed. Harper connects Paul's teaching to a "broad religious impulse toward manumission [that] runs as a submerged current through the eastern provinces".

Christianity adopted slavery as a metaphor claiming that all humans are slaves to sin. Christian rhetoric, beginning with Paul, is filled with that perspective. John Chrysostom's surviving corpus alone mentions slavery over 5,000 times. Chrysostom wrote baptismal instructions telling the officiating priest to stop at various points to remind the catechumens of how the act of baptism frees them from slavery. In legal and judicial historian Joshua C. Tate's view, "Through their baptism, the catechumens became not only free, holy, and just, but even sons of God and joint-heirs with Christ. Repeated so often, in such an important context, this message must have made a major impact on the thinking of Christian congregations and those with whom they interacted".

Outside of defeated enemies, there were three primary sources of slaves. The first most prolific source was natural reproduction (childbearing), since a child born to a slave was automatically a slave, without option, themselves. Early Christian historian Chris L. de Wet writes that Chrysostom attempted to "guard the sexual integrity of the slave by desexualizing the slave's body and criminalizing its violation. Slaves were no longer morally neutral ground – having sex with a slave while married was adultery and if unmarried, fornication". These teachings, along with the proliferation of chastity among slaves who became Christian, and the spread of ascetism through Roman society, may have lessened their sexual use and their reproductive value and impacted slavery.

The next best source of slaves was from the abandonment of unwanted children (called exposure because the babies were left exposed to the dangers of the wilds). These children were often picked up by strangers to be raised and sold as slaves. The third method was kidnapping. Christians interfered with these methods for resupply through new laws and actions taken against them. (Note: Exposed children were a major source of slaves, and changing this did not begin with Constantine. Constantine did strive to assure others that exposure was wrong, and reform the laws concerning them, but his legislation on abandoned children did not deviate markedly from the classical position. Christian influence is first evident in Roman law with the appearance of the word misericordia (compassion) under emperor Honorius and its advancement as a standard under Justinian I. Justinian added that, since the collection of an exposed infant was an act of pious compassion, therefore, it cannot lead to the enslavement of the child. Tate concluded that the law went "beyond all classical precedent in permitting even slave children to become free through the act of exposure".)

Chrysostom supported the obedience of slaves to their masters. He also told his audience, which consisted mostly of wealthy slave holders, that "Slavery is the result of greed, of degradation, of brutality, since Noah, we know, had no slave, nor Abel, nor Seth, nor those who came after them. The institution was the fruit of sin". MacMullen has written that slavery was "rebuked by Ambrose, Zeno of Verona, Gaudentius of Brescia, and Maximus of Turin", among others. Evidence indicates this oft repeated discourse on slavery shaped late ancient feelings, tastes, and opinions concerning it, and this may have impacted its practice.

=== Persecution of heretics ===
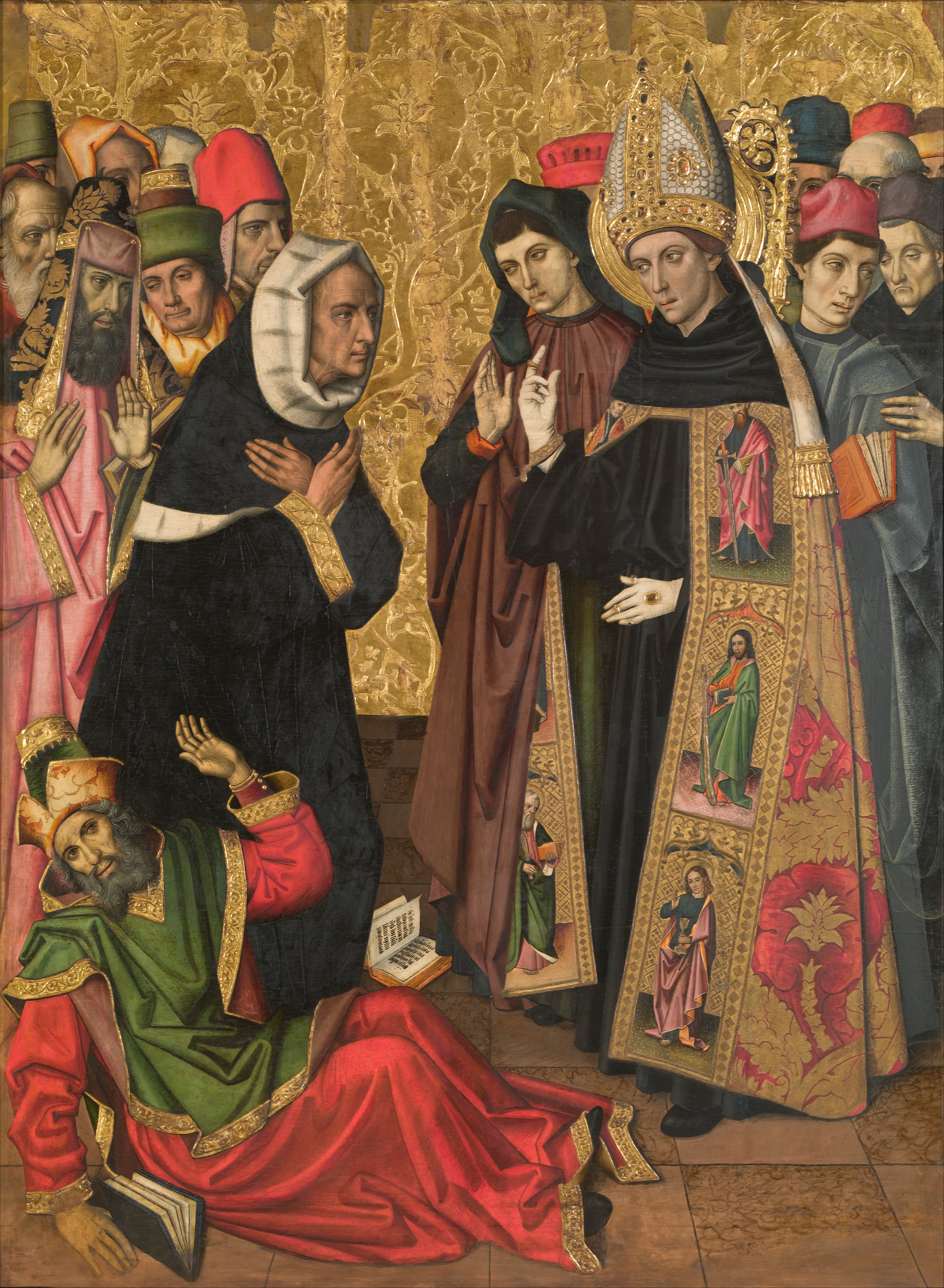
Saint Augustine Disputing with the Heretics by Vergós Group, part of the 15th century Saint Augustine Altarpiece painting

In a challenge to the assertion that the practice of charity contributed to social change and the spread of Christianity, MacMullen has written that there was hardly any charity amongst Christians toward heretics. One example often used in demonstration of this is Augustine's support of the state's use of coercion in dealing with the "heretical" Donatists. Brown says this has led to modern liberals describing Augustine as the "prince and patriarch of persecutors", since Augustine's views were referenced on into the Middle Ages.

Others have argued that Augustine was facing harsh realities, such as what he report in his Letter 28 written to bishop Novatus around 416. In it, Augustine write that Donatists had cut out the tongue and cut off the hands of a Bishop Rogatus who had recently converted to Catholicism, condemning him to a slow death by starvation, also attacking an unnamed count's agent who had been traveling with Rogatus. Rutgers professor of history Frederick Russell says Augustine confesses he does not know what to do. By this time, he report having spent twenty years verbally appealing to the Donatists using popular propaganda, debate, personal appeal, General Councils, appeals to the emperor, and even politics, and all attempts had failed.

The empire responded with force and coercion, and Augustine came to support that approach. Augustine did not believe coercion could or would convert someone, but he did observe that it softened the "stubborn Donatists" enough to make it possible to reason with them. He thought that reason would then lead to voluntary agreement, true repentance, and change.

As Augustine's biographer, Peter Brown has written that Augustine lived in a harsh, authoritarian age of punitive punishment. Yet Augustine placed limits on the type of coercion that could be used for heretics, recommending only the milder forms in common practice in the home, school and ecclesial court. He opposed all the extreme forms of torture and maiming and capital punishment common to the empire of the time. Russell and Brown see Augustine's approach as aimed at reformation of the wrong-doer rather than punitive punishment for the wrong-doing.

Russell has written that Augustine's response on coercion was context dependent. However, political scientist Herbert A. Deane says there is a fundamental inconsistency between Augustine's political thought and "his final position of approval of the use of political and legal weapons to punish religious dissidence", and others have seconded this view.

Augustine's approach to heresy contributed to a competition – what Brown calls a "rivalry between the two factions" – that not only failed to suppress Donatism but instead contributed to its spread. Where one faction would build a church, the other would follow; Donatists and Catholics built church after church competing with each other for the loyalty of the people causing the entire landscape of Roman Africa to be "covered with a white robe of churches". The Donatists survived until the Muslim conquest of the Maghreb in the closing years of the seventh century.

=== Corruption ===
Despite corruption having a long history in Roman society, Ramsay MacMullen "attributes to the fourth century ...the spread of an ethos of venality (greed and bribery) and the displacement of aristocratic networks of patronage by the indiscriminate exchange of favors for money". He has written that this practice shows the church, and Christians in government, were universally corrupt in the fourth and fifth centuries. MacMullen's thesis has produced considerable scholarly criticism that has been dubbed the "corruption debate".

When Constantine changed from silver to gold as the monetary standard, there is evidence that greed became rampant as the ruling elite "drove a primitive system of taxation and markets to its limits" to acquire gold. One question has been whether or not this constitutes corruption. Another involves the predominance of Christians in the aristocracy as beginning in the 360s under Gratian long after Constantine's death in 337 as Salzman has documented.

Modern studies have employed many of the same sources as MacMullen, but have arrived at virtually opposite conclusions. For example, in the 1960s, political scientists examined the processes of modernization in the empire, along with those practices considered "corrupt" by modern Western standards, and found that what modern historians have termed "corruption" might "sometimes systematically, have [had] a beneficial impact on a range of important goals: 'nation-building', economic development, administrative capacity, and democratization." Tim Watson concludes that, "Even if agreement can be reached on what exactly constituted 'corrupt' behavior, there is simply not enough data" in the sources to settle the corruption debate.

=== Gladiator games ===
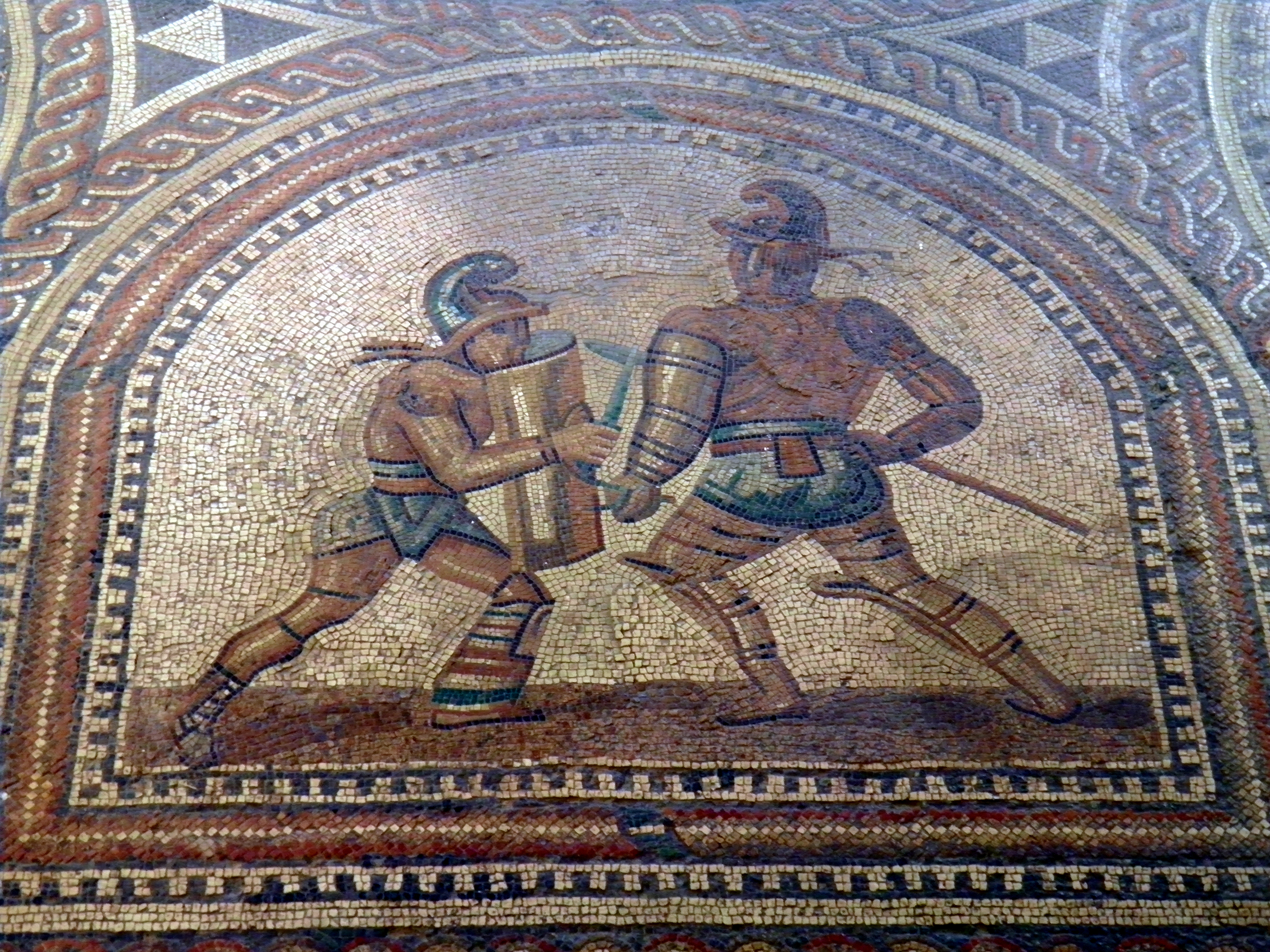
Detail of the second century gladiator mosaic floor, at Römerhalle, Bad Kreuznach, Germany

The games continued under Christian emperors delivering their message of Roman power "and the inevitability of Roman justice for criminals and those foreigners who had dared to challenge the empire's authority", writes classicist Roger Dunkle. Gladiators were often prisoners of war, slaves or criminals, were generally poor, non-citizens, and social outcasts with limited choices. Yet in the same era of increasing judicial harshness the courts stopped sentencing criminals to the arena. There is no source of information explaining why.

MacMullen has written that, "the role of Christianity in the abandoning of most western gladiatorial combat was nil." However, as historian Fik Meijer has written, while gladiator shows were never effectively officially politically abolished, Christians did speak out against them, and the rising number of Christians in the population in the late fourth century caused the popularity of the games to decline. It is likely the games ended from this lack of public support before 440.

=== Intolerance ===
Gibbon's 'intolerance argument' asserted that Christians, being monotheists, could not emulate the easy acceptance of other deities that characterized a polytheist system, and so were intolerant and oppressive, thereby coercing conversion out of fear. This view can be traced through the scholarship of the two centuries that came after him. According to Brown, the imperial laws, even though they were not enforced, did have a cumulative effect by 425. They set in place the religious order of Roman society: there was the Catholic church, heresies hostile to the 'true faith', and the two great 'outsiders': Judaism and all of polytheism which was jointly called 'paganism'. It is possible to follow in the laws the emergence of a language of intolerance shared by the Christian court and by vocal elements in provincial society.

Drake writes that the intolerance argument is incomplete. It can't explain why "tolerant" pagans persecuted "intolerant" Christians. It doesn't explain why Christians worried about the validity of coerced faith and resisted such aggressive actions for centuries. Drake suggests the tradition in early Christianity which favored and operated toward peace, moderation, and conciliation held that true belief could not be compelled for the simple reason that God could tell the difference between voluntary and coerced worship.

Drake says intolerance in the later centuries of the empire cannot be considered solely a religious issue. Instead, he states that intolerance was a political response to what, today, would be labeled "national security" issues. This is defined as any threat to core community values with particular regard to behaviors that appear to threaten the security of that community. Scholars of antiquity have increasingly turned to theories of identity formation and boundary maintenance to explain the increase in intolerance in the fifth century and beyond.

=== Difference in sexual morality ===
MacMullen has written that Christianity did make a moral difference in Roman Empire in the area of sexual conduct: "Here we see an absolutely remarkable impact on manners and morals that was to shape also the whole millennium to come". Classics scholar Kyle Harper states it this way: "the triumph of Christianity not only drove profound cultural change, it created a new relationship between sexual morality and society ... The legacy of Christianity lies in the dissolution of an ancient system where social and political status, power, and the transmission of social inequality to the next generation scripted the terms of sexual morality". He concludes that "there are risks in over-estimating the changes in old sexual patterns that Christianity was able to promote, but there are risks, too, in underestimating Christianization as a watershed."

=== Sanctity of life ===
Historians Marc Stauch and Kay Wheat write that "in Greek and Roman times not all human life was regarded as worthy of protection. Slaves and 'barbarians' did not have a full right to life and human sacrifices and gladiatorial combat were acceptable... [F]or Plato, infanticide is one of the regular institutions of the ideal State; ... And whilst there were deviations from these views... such practices...were less proscribed in ancient times. Several historians of western morals agree that the rise of ...Christianity contributed greatly to the general feeling that human life is valuable and worthy of respect".

W.E.H.Lecky gives the now classical account in his history of European morals saying Christianity "formed a new standard" of belief in the sanctity of human life. Legal and ethical scholar John Keown distinguishes this 'sanctity of life' doctrine from "a quality of life approach, which recognizes only instrumental value in human life, and a vitalistic approach, which regards life as an absolute moral value... [Keown says it is the] sanctity of life approach ... which embeds a presumption in favor of preserving life, but concedes that there are circumstances in which life should not be preserved at all costs". This continues to provide a conceptual foundation for modern laws concerning end of life issues.

=== Education ===
By the second century, the merging of Christianity and the Greek intellectual tradition concerning education formed the belief that Christianity was the new paideia of mankind. Classicist Werner Jaeger has written a now classic book saying that early Christianity and its essential agreement with Plato and philosophy was understood by the early church fathers as the greatest educational power in history.

During the period of European history often called the Dark Ages which followed the collapse of the Western Roman Empire in AD 476, many monks sought refuge at the far fringes of the known world going to places like Cornwall, Ireland, or the Hebrides. These monks were literate, as Christian monks were taught to be, since reading for a period every day was a fixed requirement in the Rules of most monastic Orders. Monasteries routinely included schools. These monks became some of the last Western European preservers of the poetic and philosophical works of classical Western antiquity. By around AD 800 they were producing illuminated manuscripts, such as the Book of Kells, by which classical learning was re-communicated to Western Europe. As Western Europe became more orderly again, the Church remained a driving force in education, setting up Cathedral schools beginning in the Early Middle Ages as centers of education, which became medieval universities, the springboard of many of Western Europe's later achievements.

=== Sociological effects ===
The historian Geoffrey Blainey compares the Catholic Church in its first 1200 years to an early version of a welfare state: "It conducted hospitals for the old and orphanages for the young; hospices for the sick of all ages; places for the lepers; and hostels or inns where pilgrims could buy a cheap bed and meal". It supplied food to the population during famine and distributed food to the poor. The church ran schools. This was funded through the church's collection of taxes on a large scale, by the church's ownership of large farmlands and estates from the 800s, and by donations. Christian charity and the practice of feeding and clothing the poor, visiting prisoners, supporting widows and orphan children has had sweeping impact, and charity has become a common and mostly universal practice.

The formation of monasteries as organized bodies of believers distinct from the established forms of political and familial authority gradually carved out a series of social spaces with some amount of independence. This revolutionized social history, especially for women, who were then able to establish some power and influence in their own right.

=== Law ===
The canon law of the Catholic Church (Latin: jus canonicum) is the system of laws and legal principles made and enforced by the hierarchical authorities of the Church to regulate its external organization and government and to order and direct the activities of Catholics toward the mission of the Church. It was the first modern Western legal system and is the oldest continuously functioning legal system in the West, predating the European common law and civil law traditions.

== See also ==
- Christianity and paganism
- Religious policies of Constantine the Great
- Theodosius I
- Anti-paganism policies of the early Byzantine Empire
- History of Christianity
- Timeline of Christianity

== Bibliography ==
=== Books and Journals ===
- Abruzzi, William (2018). Mithraism and Christianity. doi:10.13140/RG.2.2.36486.52804.
- Adams, Gregory; Adams, Kristina (2012). "Circumcision in the Early Christian Church: The Controversy That Shaped a Continent". In Bolnick, David; Koyle, Martin; Yosha, Assaf (eds.). Surgical Guide to Circumcision. Berlin: Springer. pp. 290–298. doi:10.1007/978-1-4471-2858-8_26. ISBN 978-1-4471-2858-8.
- Bagnall, Roger S. (1993). Egypt in Late Antiquity. Princeton: Princeton University Press. ISBN 978-0-691-06986-9.
- Bagnall, Roger S. (2021). Egypt in Late Antiquity (illustrated, reprint ed.). Princeton: Princeton University Press. ISBN 978-1-4008-2116-7.
- Bagnall, Roger S.; Alan Cameron; Seth R. Schwartz & Klaas A. Worp (1987). Consuls of the Later Roman Empire. Oxford: Oxford University Press. ISBN 978-1-55540-099-6.
- Barritt, David (2019). "8: The Roman Revolution: Leo I, Theodosius II and the Contest for Power in the 5th Century". Constructing Late Antiquity and Byzantium: Introducing Trends and Turning Points. Leiden: Brill. pp. 115–132. ISBN 978-90-04-39574-9.
- Barton, John (1998). Holy Writings, Sacred Text: The Canon in Early Christianity (reprint ed.). Louisville: Westminster John Knox Press. ISBN 978-0-664-25778-1.
- Bayliss, Richard (2004). Provincial Cilicia and the Archaeology of Temple Conversion. Oxford: Archaeopress. ISBN 978-1-84171-634-3.
- Berger, Adolf (1953). Encyclopedic Dictionary of Roman Law. Vol. 43 (Part 2). Philadelphia: The American Philosophical Society. ISBN 978-0-87169-435-5. OCLC 873814450.
- Biondi, Biondo (1952). Il diritto romano cristiano [Christian Roman law] (in Italian). Vol. 1. Milan: Giuffre.
- Boatwright, Mary Taliaferro; Gargola, Daniel J.; Talbert, Richard John Alexander (2004). The Romans: From Village to Empire. Oxford: Oxford University Press. ISBN 978-0-19-511875-9.
- Bokenkotter, Thomas (2007). A Concise History of the Catholic Church (Revised ed.). New York: Crown Publishing Group. ISBN 978-0-307-42348-1.
- Boyd, William Kenneth (2005). The Ecclesiastical Edicts of the Theodosian Code (reprint ed.). Clark: The Lawbook Exchange, Ltd. ISBN 978-1-58477-531-7.
- Bremmer, Jan N. "2: Priestesses, Pogroms and Persecutions: Religious Violence in Antiquity in a Diachronic Perspective". In Raschle & Dijkstra (2020).
- Bremner, Robert H. (2017). Giving: Charity and Philanthropy in History. London: Routledge. ISBN 978-1-56000-884-2.
- Brown, Peter (1995). Authority and the Sacred: Aspects of the Christianisation of the Roman World. Cambridge: Cambridge University Press. ISBN 978-0-521-49557-8.
- Brown, Peter (1998). "Christianization and religious conflict". In Averil Cameron; Peter Garnsey (eds.). The Cambridge Ancient History XIII: The Late Empire, A.D. 337–425. The Cambridge Ancient History, second series. Cambridge University Press. pp. 632–664. ISBN 978-0-521-30200-5.
- Brown, Peter (2002). Poverty and Leadership in the Later Roman Empire. Lebanon: University Press of New England. ISBN 978-1-58465-146-8.
- Brown, Peter (2003). The Rise of Western Christendom: Triumph and Diversity, A.D. 200-1000 (2nd ed.). Malden: Blackwell Publishers. ISBN 978-0-631-22137-1.
- Brown, Peter (2012). Through the Eye of a Needle: Wealth, the Fall of Rome, and the Making of Christianity in the West, 350–550 AD. Princeton: Princeton University Press. ISBN 978-0-691-15290-5.
- Buckland, W. W. (1963). A Text-book of Roman Law from Augustus to Justinian. Revised by Peter Stein (Third ed.). Cambridge: Cambridge University Press. ISBN 978-0-521-04360-1.
- Burkett, Delbert (2002). An Introduction to the New Testament and the Origins of Christianity. Cambridge: Cambridge University Press. ISBN 978-1-316-28423-0.
- Cameron, Alan (2011). The Last Pagans of Rome. Oxford: Oxford University Press. ISBN 978-0-19-974727-6.
- Cameron, Averil (1991). Christianity and the Rhetoric of Empire: The Development of Christian Discourse. Berkeley: University of California Press. ISBN 978-0-520-07160-5.
- Cameron, Averil (1993). The Later Roman Empire, AD 284-430 (illustrated ed.). Cambridge: Harvard University Press. ISBN 978-0-674-51194-1.
- Castelli, Elizabeth A. (2004). Martyrdom and Memory: Early Christian Culture Making. New York: Columbia University Press.
- Chuvin, Pierre (1990). A Chronicle of the Last Pagans. Cambridge: Harvard University Press. ISBN 978-0-674-12970-2.
- Clarke, W.K.Lowther (1913). St.Basil the Great A Study in Monasticism. Cambridge: Cambridge University Press.
- Cloke, Gillian (1995). This Female Man of God: Women and Spiritual Power in the Patristic Age, 350–450 AD. London: Routledge. ISBN 978-0-415-09469-6.
- Collar, Anna (2013). Religious Networks in the Roman Empire (illustrated, reprint ed.). Cambridge: Cambridge University Press. ISBN 978-1-107-04344-2.
- Combes, I.A.H. (1998). The Metaphor of Slavery in the Writings of the Early Church: From the New Testament to the Beginning of the Fifth Century. Sheffield: Sheffield Academic Press. ISBN 978-1-85075-846-4.
- Crislip, Andrew T. (2005). From Monastery to Hospital: Christian Monasticism & The Transformation of Health Care in Late Antiquity. Ann Arbor: University of Michigan Press. ISBN 978-0-472-11474-0.
- Deane, Herbert A. (2013). The Political and Social Ideas of St. Augustine (second ed.). New York: Angelico Press. ISBN 978-1-62138-034-4.
- de Sainte-Croix, G. E. M. (2006). Christian Persecution, Martyrdom, and Orthodoxy. New York: Oxford University Press. ISBN 978-0-19-927812-1.
- Digeser, Elizabeth DePalma (2000). The Making of a Christian Empire: Lactantius & Rome. Ithaca: Cornell University Press. ISBN 978-0-8014-3594-2.
- Dodds, E. R. (1970). Pagan and Christian in an Age of Anxiety: Some Aspects of Religious Experience from Marcus Aurelius to Constantine. New York: Norton. ISBN 978-0-393-00545-5.
- Dodds, Eric Robertson (1990). Pagan and Christian in an Age of Anxiety: Some Aspects of Religious Experience from Marcus Aurelius to Constantine (illustrated, reprint ed.). Cambridge: Cambridge University Press. ISBN 978-0-521-38599-2.
- Donato, Antonio (2013). Boethius' Consolation of Philosophy as a Product of Late Antiquity. Oxford: A&C Black.
- Dowling, Melissa Barden (2006). Clemency and Cruelty in the Roman World. Ann Arbor: University of Michigan Press. ISBN 978-0-472-11515-0.
- Drake, H.A., ed. (2006). Violence in Late Antiquity: Perceptions and Practices. Aldershot: Ashgate. ISBN 978-0-7546-5498-8.
- Dunkle, R. (2008). Gladiators: Violence and Spectacle in Ancient Rome (1st ed.). London: Routledge. doi:10.4324/9781315847887. ISBN 978-1-317-90521-9.
- Dunn, James D.G. (1999). Jews and Christians: The Parting of the Ways, A.D. 70 to 135. Grand Rapids: Wm. B. Eerdmans Publishing. ISBN 978-0-8028-4498-9.
- Ehrman, Bart (2012). Did Jesus Exist?: The Historical Argument for Jesus of Nazareth. New York: Harper Collins. ISBN 978-0-06-208994-6.
- Ekonomou, Andrew J. (2007). Byzantine Rome and the Greek Popes: Eastern Influences on Rome and the Papacy from Gregory the Great to Zacharias, A.D. 590-752. Washington: Lexington Books. ISBN 978-0-7391-3386-6.
- Errington, R. Malcolm (2006). Roman Imperial Policy from Julian to Theodosius. Chapel Hill: University of North Carolina Press. ISBN 978-0-8078-3038-3.
- Fiorenza, Elisabeth Schüssler (1983). In Memory of Her: A Feminist Theological Reconstruction of Christian Origins (reprint ed.). New York: Crossroads. ISBN 978-0-8245-0493-9.
- Forbes, Bruce David (2008). Christmas: A Candid History (illustrated, reprint ed.). Berkeley: University of California Press. ISBN 978-0-520-25802-0.
- Fox, Robin Lane (1987). Pagans and Christians. New York: Alfred A. Knopf. ISBN 978-0-394-55495-2.
- Fredriksen, Paula (2012). Sin: The Early History of an Idea. Princeton: Princeton University Press. ISBN 978-0-691-12890-0.
- Frend, W. H. C. (2006). "Persecutions: Genesis and Legacy". In Mitchell, Margaret M.; Young, Frances M. (eds.). The Cambridge History of Christianity, Volume I: Origins to Constantine. New York: Cambridge University Press. pp. 503–523. ISBN 978-0-521-81239-9.
- Gaddis, Michael (2005). There Is No Crime for Those Who Have Christ: Religious Violence in the Christian Roman Empire. Berkeley, Los Angeles, and London: University of California Press. ISBN 978-0-520-24104-6.
- Garrison, Roman (1993). Redemptive Almsgiving in Early Christianity. Sheffield: JSOT Press. ISBN 978-1-85075-376-6.
- Gerberding, R.; Moran Cruz, J. H. (2004). Medieval Worlds. New York: Houghton Mifflin Company.
- Gibbon, Edward (1782). History of the Decline and Fall of the Roman Empire. Vol. III (reprint ed.). Aldine Pub. Co.
- Gibbon, Edward (1906). "XX". In Bury, J.B. (ed.). The History of the Decline and Fall of the Roman Empire. Vol. 3. New York: Fred de Fau and Co.
- Glancy, Jennifer A. (2002). Slavery in Early Christianity. Philadelphia: Fortress Press. ISBN 978-1-4514-1094-5.
- Green, Bernard (2010). Christianity in Ancient Rome: The First Three Centuries. London: A&C Black. ISBN 978-0-5670-3250-8.
- Grubbs, Judith Evans (2009). "Church, State, and Children: Christian and Imperial Attitudes Toward Infant Exposure in Late Antiquity". In Andrew Cain; Noel Lenski (eds.). The Power of Religion in Late Antiquity. Farnham: Ashgate. pp. 119–131. ISBN 978-0-7546-6725-4.
- Guy, Laurie (2011). Introducing Early Christianity: A Topical Survey of Its Life, Beliefs Practices. Westmont: InterVarsity Press.
- Hahn, Scott W.; Scott, David, eds. (2007). Letter & Spirit, Volume 3: The Hermeneutic of Continuity: Christ, Kingdom, and Creation. Steubenville: Emmaus Road Publishing. ISBN 978-1-931018-46-3.
- Harper, Kyle (2011). Slavery in the Late Roman World, AD 275–425. Cambridge: Cambridge University Press. doi:10.1017/CBO9780511973451. ISBN 978-0-521-19861-5.
- Harper, Kyle (2013). From Shame to Sin: The Christian Transformation of Sexual Morality in Late Antiquity. Cambridge: Harvard University Press. ISBN 978-0-674-07277-0.
- Harries, Jill (2013). "Chapter 4: The Senatus Consultum Silanianum: Court Decisions and Judicial Severity in the Early Roman Empire". In Paul J. du Plessis (ed.). New Frontiers: Law and Society in the Roman World. Edinburgh: Edinburgh University Press. pp. 51–70. ISBN 978-0-7486-6817-5.
- Hart, David Bentley (2009). Atheist Delusions: The Christian Revolution and Its Fashionable Enemies (unabridged ed.). New Haven: Yale University Press. ISBN 978-0-300-15564-8.
- Hebblewhite, Mark (2020). Theodosius and the Limits of Empire. London: Routledge. doi:10.4324/9781315103334. ISBN 978-1-138-10298-9. S2CID 213344890.
- Hellerman, Joseph H. (2009). When the Church Was a Family: Recapturing Jesus' Vision for Authentic Christian Community. Nashville: B&H Publishing Group. ISBN 978-1-4336-6843-2.
- Herrin, Judith (2009). "Book Burning as purification". In Rousseau, Philip; Papoutsakis, Emmanuel (eds.). Transformations of Late Antiquity: Essays for Peter Brown. Vol. 2 (illustrated, reprint ed.). Farnham: Ashgate Publishing, Ltd. ISBN 978-0-7546-6553-3.
- Hillner, Julia (2015). Prison, Punishment and Penance in Late Antiquity. Cambridge: Cambridge University Press. ISBN 978-0-521-51751-5.
- Holloway, R. Ross (2004). Constantine & Rome. New Haven: Yale University Press. ISBN 978-0-300-10043-3.
- Hope, Valerie M. (2001). "Negotiating identity and status: the gladiators of Roman Nîmes". In Laurence, Ray; Berry, Joanne (eds.). Cultural identity in the Roman Empire. London: Psychology Press. pp. 179–195. ISBN 978-0-415-24149-6.
- Hughes, Kevin L.; Paffenroth, Kim, eds. (2008). Augustine and Liberal Education. Washington: Lexington Books. ISBN 978-0-7391-2383-6.
- Humfress, Caroline (2013). "5: Laws' Empire: Roman Universalism and Legal Practice". New Frontiers: Law and Society in the Roman World. Edinburgh University Press. ISBN 978-0-7486-6817-5.
- Jaeger, Werner (1961). Early Christianity and Greek Paideia. Cambridge: Harvard University Press. ISBN 978-0-674-22052-2.
- Johnson, Scott Fitzgerald, ed. (2015). The Oxford Handbook of Late Antiquity. Oxford: Oxford University Press. ISBN 978-0-19-027753-6.
- Jones, Arnold Hugh Martin (1986). The Later Roman Empire, 284-602: A Social Economic and Administrative Survey. Vol. 1 (reprint ed.). Baltimore: Johns Hopkins University Press. ISBN 978-0-8018-3353-3.
- Jonsen, Albert (2000). A Short History of Medical Ethics. New York: Oxford University Press. ISBN 978-0-19-513455-1.
- Judge, E.A. (2010). Alanna Nobbs (ed.). Jerusalem and Athens: Cultural Transformation in Late Antiquity. Tübingen: Mohr Siebeck. ISBN 978-3-16-150572-0.
- Kahlos, Maijastina (2019). Religious Dissent in Late Antiquity, 350–450. Oxford: Oxford University Press. ISBN 978-0-19-006725-0.
- Kaplan, Steven (1995). Indigenous Responses to Western Christianity (illustrated ed.). New York: New York University Press. ISBN 978-0-8147-4649-3.
- Kelhoffer, James A. (2010). Persecution, Persuasion and Power: Readiness to Withstand Hardship as a Corroboration of Legitimacy in the New Testament. Vol. 270. Tübingen: Mohr Siebeck. ISBN 978-3-16-150612-3.
- Kloft, Hans (2010). Mysterienkulte der Antike. Götter, Menschen, Rituale [Mystery Cults of Antiquity. Gods, Humans, Rituals] (in German). Munich: C.H. Beck. ISBN 978-3-406-44606-1.
- Knapp, Robert (2017). The Dawn of Christianity: People and Gods in a Time of Magic and Miracles (illustrated ed.). Cambridge: Harvard University Press. ISBN 978-0-674-97646-7.
- Kremer, Jakob (1977). Die Osterevangelien – Geschichten um Geschichte [The Easter Gospels – Stories About History] (in German). Stuttgart: Katholisches Bibelwerk.
- Langlands, Rebecca (2006). Sexual Morality in Ancient Rome. Cambridge: Cambridge University Press. ISBN 978-0-521-85943-1.
- Latourette, Kenneth Scott (1965). Christianity Through the Ages. Harper & Row. ISBN 978-0-06-065011-7.
- Lavan, Luke; Mulryan, Michael, eds. (2011). The Archaeology of Late Antique 'Paganism'. Leiden: Brill. ISBN 978-90-04-19237-9.
- Le Goff, Jacques (1986). The Birth of Purgatory. Chicago: University of Chicago Press. ISBN 978-0-226-47083-2.
- Leone, Anna (2013). The End of the Pagan City: Religion, Economy, and Urbanism in Late Antique North Africa (illustrated ed.). Oxford: Oxford University Press. ISBN 978-0-19-957092-8.
- Lindsay, Jack (1968). The Ancient World: Manners and Morals. New York: G. P. Putnam. OL 5602276M.
- MacDonald, Margaret Y. (2003). "Was Celsus Right? The Role of Women in the Expansion of Early Christianity". In David L. Balch; Carolyn Osiek (eds.). Early Christian Families in Context: An Interdisciplinary Dialogue. Grand Rapids: Wm. B. Eerdmans. pp. 157–184. ISBN 978-0-8028-3986-2.
- MacMullen, Ramsay (1984). Christianizing the Roman Empire: (A.D. 100–400). New Haven: Yale University Press. ISBN 978-0-300-03216-1.
- Malcolm, Matthew R. (2013). Paul and the Rhetoric of Reversal in 1 Corinthians: The Impact of Paul's Gospel on His Macro-Rhetoric. Cambridge: Cambridge University Press. ISBN 978-1-107-03209-5.
- Markus, R. A. (1970). Saeculum: History and Society in the Theology of St. Augustine. Cambridge: Cambridge University Press. ISBN 978-0-521-07621-0.
- Markus, Robert Austin (1990). The End of Ancient Christianity (illustrated, reprint ed.). Cambridge: Cambridge University Press. ISBN 978-0-521-33949-0.
- Matthews, John F. (2000). Laying Down the Law: A Study of the Theodosian Code. New York: Yale University Press.
- McKinion, Steve, ed. (2001). Life and Practice in the Early Church: A Documentary Reader. New York: New York University Press. ISBN 978-0-8147-5648-5.
- McGrath, Alister E. (2006). Christianity: An introduction (2nd ed.). Malden: Blackwell Pub. ISBN 978-1-4051-0901-7.
- Meeks, Wayne A. (2002). In Search of the Early Christians: Selected Essays. New Haven: Yale University Press. ISBN 978-0-300-09142-7.
- Meijer, Fik (2005). The Gladiators: History's Most Deadly Sport (illustrated ed.). New York: Macmillan. ISBN 978-0-312-34874-8.
- Milnor, Kristina (2011). "Women in Roman Society". In Peachin, Michael (ed.). The Oxford Handbook of Social Relations in the Roman World. doi:10.1093/oxfordhb/9780195188004.013.0029. ISBN 978-0-19-518800-4.
- Moss, Candida R. (2012). Ancient Christian Martyrdom: Diverse Practices, Theologies, and Traditions. New Haven: Yale University Press. ISBN 978-0-300-15465-8.
- Muir, Steven C. (2006). "10: "Look how they love one another" Early Christian and Pagan Care for the sick and other charity". Religious Rivalries in the Early Roman Empire and the Rise of Christianity. Waterloo: Wilfrid Laurier University Press. ISBN 978-0-88920-536-9.
- Nathan, Geoffrey (2002). The Family in Late Antiquity: The Rise of Christianity and the Endurance of Tradition (reprint ed.). New York: Routledge. ISBN 978-1-134-70668-6.
- North, J. A. (2013). "The Development of Religious Pluralism". In Lieu, Judith; North, John; Rajak, Tessa (eds.). The Jews among Pagans and Christians in the Roman Empire (reprint ed.). New York: Routledge. pp. 174–193. ISBN 978-1-135-08188-1.
- Okin, Susan Moller (1979). Women in Western Political Thought. Princeton: Princeton University Press. ISBN 978-0-691-02191-1.
- Orlin, Eric (2010). Foreign Cults in Rome: Creating a Roman Empire. Oxford: Oxford University Press. ISBN 978-0-19-978020-4.
- Perrottet, Tony (2004). The Naked Olympics: The True Story of the Ancient Games. New York: Random House. ISBN 978-1-58836-382-4.
- Pharr, Clyde; Davidson, Theresa Sherrer; Pharr, Mary Brown, eds. (2001). The Theodosian Code and Novels, and the Sirmondian Constitutions (reprint ed.). Clark: The Lawbook Exchange, Ltd. ISBN 978-1-58477-146-3.
- Price, S. R. F. (1986). Rituals and Power: The Roman Imperial Cult in Asia Minor (illustrated, reprint, revised ed.). Cambridge: Cambridge University Press. ISBN 978-0-521-31268-4.
- Raschle, Christian R.; Dijkstra, Jitse H. F., eds. (2020). Religious Violence in the Ancient World From Classical Athens to Late Antiquity. Cambridge: Cambridge University Press. ISBN 978-1-108-84921-0.
- Remijsen, Sofie (2015). The End of Greek Athletics in Late Antiquity. Cambridge: Cambridge University Press. ISBN 978-1-1070-5078-5.
- Riggs, David. "Christianizing the Rural Communities of Late Roman Africa: A Process of Coercion or Persuasion?". In Drake (2006), pp. 297–308.
- Russell, Frederick H. (1999). "Persuading the Donatists: Augustine's Coercion by Words". The Limits of Ancient Christianity: Essays on Late Antique Thought and Culture in Honor of R.A. Markus. Ann Arbor: University of Michigan Press. ISBN 978-0-472-10997-5.
- Russell, James C. (1996). The Germanization of Early Medieval Christianity: A Sociohistorical Approach to Religious Transformation (reprint ed.). Oxford: Oxford University Press. ISBN 978-0-19-510466-0.
- Salzman, Michele Renee (2002). The Making of a Christian Aristocracy: Social and Religious Change in the Western Roman Empire. Cambridge: Harvard University Press. ISBN 978-0-674-00641-6.
- Salzman, Michele Renee. "Rethinking Pagan-Christian Violence". In Drake (2006), pp. 265–286.
- Salzman, Michele Renee; Sághy, Marianne; Testa, Rita Lizzi, eds. (2016). Pagans and Christians in Late Antique Rome: Conflict, Competition, and Coexistence in the Fourth Century. Cambridge: Cambridge University Press. ISBN 978-1-107-11030-4.
- Salzman, Michelle Renee (2021). The Falls of Rome: Crises, Resilience, and Resurgence in Late Antiquity. Cambridge: Cambridge University Press. ISBN 978-1-107-11142-4.
- Sáry, Pál (2019). "Remarks on the Edict of Thessalonica of 380". In Vojtech Vladár (ed.). Perpauca Terrena Blande Honori dedicata pocta Petrovi Blahovi K Nedožitým 80. Narodeninám. Trnava: Trnavská Univerzity. pp. 67–80. ISBN 978-80-568-0313-4.
- Schmidt, Charles (1889). "Chapter Five: The Poor and Unfortunate". The Social Results of Early Christianity. London: William Isbister Ltd. ISBN 978-0-7905-3105-2.
- Schott, Jeremy M. (2008). Christianity, Empire, and the Making of Religion in Late Antiquity. Philadelphia: University of Philadelphia Press. ISBN 978-0-8122-4092-4.
- Schwartz, Seth (2005). "Chapter 8: Roman Historians and the Rise of Christianity: The School of Edward Gibbon". In Harris, William Vernon (ed.). The Spread of Christianity in the First Four Centuries: Essays in Explanation. Leiden: Brill. ISBN 978-90-04-14717-1.
- Scourfield, J. H. D. (2007). Texts and Culture in Late Antiquity: Inheritance, Authority, and Change. Bristol: ISD LLC. ISBN 978-1-910589-45-8.
- Southern, Patricia (2015). The Roman Empire from Severus to Constantine (second, revised ed.). London: Routledge. ISBN 978-1-317-49694-6.
- Stachura, Michał (2018). Enemies of the Later Roman Order: A Study of the Phenomenon of Language Aggression in the Theodosian Code, Post-Theodosian Novels, and the Sirmondian Constitutions. Krakow: Jagiellonian University Press. ISBN 978-83-233-4505-3.
- Stark, Rodney (1996). The Rise of Christianity: A Sociologist Reconsiders History. Princeton: Princeton University Press. ISBN 978-0-691-02749-4.
- Testa, Rita Lizzi, ed. (2017). Late Antiquity in Contemporary Debate. Newcastle upon Tyne: Cambridge Scholars Publishing. ISBN 978-1-4438-7656-8.
- Thompson, Glen L. (2005). "Constantius II and the First Removal of the Altar of Victory". In Jean-Jacques Aubert; Zsuzsanna Varhelyi (eds.). A Tall Order: Writing the Social History of the Ancient World – Essays in honor of William V. Harris. Munich: K.G. Saur. pp. 85–106. doi:10.1515/9783110931419. ISBN 978-3-598-77828-5.
- Tilley, Maureen A. (1996). Donatist Martyr Stories The Church in Conflict in Roman North Africa. Liverpool: Liverpool University Press. ISBN 978-0-85323-931-4.
- Trebilco, Paul Raymond (2017). Outsider Designations and Boundary Construction in the New Testament: Early Christian Communities and the Formation of Group Identity. Cambridge: Cambridge University Press. ISBN 978-1-108-31132-8.
- Tripolitis, Antonia (2002). Religions of the Hellenistic-Roman Age (illustrated, reprint ed.). Grand Rapids: Wm. B. Eerdmans. ISBN 978-0-8028-4913-7.
- Trombley, Frank R. (2001) [1995]. Hellenic Religion and Christianization c. 370–529 (2nd ed.). Leiden: Brill. ISBN 978-0-391-04121-9.
- Tsang, Sam (2005). From Slaves to Sons: A New Rhetoric Analysis on Paul's Slave Metaphors in His Letter to the Galatians. Bern: Peter Lang Publishers. ISBN 978-0-8204-7636-0.
- Ulhorn, Gerhard (1883). Christian Charity in the Ancient Church. New York: Charles Scribner's Sons.
- Vaage, Leif E. (2006). Religious Rivalries in the Early Roman Empire and the Rise of Christianity. Waterloo: Wilfrid Laurier University Press. ISBN 978-0-88920-536-9.
- Van Daalen, D. H. (1972). The Real Resurrection. London: Collins.
- Watson, Tim William (2010). The Rhetoric of Corruption in Late Antiquity (Thesis). UC Riverside.
- Watts, Edward J. (2017). Hypatia: The Life and Legend of an Ancient Philosopher. Oxford: Oxford University Press. ISBN 978-0-19-065914-1.
- Wessel, Susan (2016). Passion and Compassion in Early Christianity (illustrated ed.). Cambridge: Cambridge University Press. ISBN 978-1-107-12510-0.
- Wessels, G. Francois (2010). "The Letter to Philemon in the Context of Slavery in Early Christianity". In D. Francois Tolmie (ed.). Philemon in Perspective: Interpreting a Pauline Letter. Berlin: De Gruyter. pp. 143–168. doi:10.1515/9783110221749. ISBN 978-3-11-022173-2.
- Wet, Chris L. de (2015). Preaching Bondage: John Chrysostom and the Discourse of Slavery in Early Christianity. Oakland: University of California Press. ISBN 978-0-520-28621-4.
- Williams, Michael A.; Cox, Collett; Jaffee, Martin, eds. (1992). "Religious innovation: An introductory essay". Innovation in Religious Traditions: Essays in the Interpretation of Religious Change. Religion and Society. Vol. 31. Berlin, Boston: De Gruyter. pp. 1–18. doi:10.1515/9783110876352.1. ISBN 978-3-11087-635-2.
- Wright, N.T. (2016). The Day the Revolution Began: Reconsidering the Meaning of Jesus's Crucifixion. New York: HarperOne. ISBN 978-0-06-233438-1.
- Younger, John (2005). Sex in the Ancient World from A to Z. London: Routledge. ISBN 978-0-415-24252-3.

=== Journal articles ===
- Anastos, Milton (1967). "The Edict of Milan (313): A Defence of Its Traditional Authorship and Designation". Revue des études byzantines. 25 (1): 13–41. doi:10.3406/rebyz.1967.1383.
- Bagnall, Roger S. (1987). "Conversion and Onomastics: A Reply". Zeitschrift für Papyrologie und Epigraphik. 69: 243–250. ISSN 0084-5388.
- Barnes, T. D. (1968). "Legislation against the Christians". The Journal of Roman Studies. 58: 32–50. doi:10.2307/299693. JSTOR 299693. S2CID 161858491.
- Bilias, Konstantinos; Grigolo, Francesca (2019). Bartz, Jessica (ed.). "Lares and lararia: The domestic religion brought out to the sidewalk". Public Private. 79. Humboldt-Universität zu Berlin.
- Boyd, Robert; Richerson, Peter J. (2010). "Transmission Coupling Mechanisms: Cultural Group Selection". Philosophical Transactions: Biological Sciences. 365 (1559): 3787–95. doi:10.1098/rstb.2010.0046. JSTOR 20789194. PMC 2981912. PMID 21041204.
- Boyer, Pascal (1992). "Explaining Religious Ideas: Elements of a Cognitive Approach". Numen. 39 (1): 27–57. doi:10.2307/3270074. JSTOR 3270074.
- Bradbury, Scott (1994). "Constantine and the Problem of Anti-Pagan Legislation in the Fourth Century". Classical Philology. 89 (2): 120–139. doi:10.1086/367402. S2CID 159997492.
- Bradbury, Scott (1995). "Julian's Pagan Revival and the Decline of Blood Sacrifice". Phoenix. 49 (4): 331–356. doi:10.2307/1088885. JSTOR 1088885.
- Brown, Peter (1961). "Religious Dissent in the Later Roman Empire: The Case of North Africa". History. 46 (157): 83–101. doi:10.1111/j.1468-229X.1961.tb02436.x.
- Brown, P. (1961). "Aspects of the Christianization of the Roman Aristocracy". Journal of Roman Studies. 51 (1–2): 1–11. doi:10.2307/298830. JSTOR 298830. S2CID 155251310.
- Brown, Peter (1963). "Religious Coercion in the Later Roman Empire: The Case of North Africa". History. 48 (164). Wiley: 283–305. doi:10.1111/j.1468-229X.1963.tb02320.x. JSTOR 24405550.
- Brown, Peter (1964). "St. Augustine's Attitude to Religious Coercion". The Journal of Roman Studies. 54 (1–2): 107–116. doi:10.2307/298656. JSTOR 298656. S2CID 162757247.
- Brown, Peter (1993). "The Problem of Christianization" (PDF). Proceedings of the British Academy. 84. Oxford University Press: 89–106. Archived from the original (PDF) on 3 March 2022.
- Brown, Peter (1997). "SO Debate: The World of Late Antiquity Revisited". Symbolae Osloenses. 72 (1): 5–30. doi:10.1080/00397679708590917. ISSN 1502-7805.
- Bryant, Joseph M. (1993). "The Sect-Church Dynamic and Christian Expansion in the Roman Empire: Persecution, Penitential Discipline, and Schism in Sociological Perspective". The British Journal of Sociology. 44 (2): 303–339. doi:10.2307/591221. JSTOR 591221.
- Castelli, Elizabeth A. (1998). "Gender, Theory, and The Rise of Christianity: A Response to Rodney Stark". Journal of Early Christian Studies. 6 (2). Johns Hopkins University Press: 227–257. doi:10.1353/earl.1998.0034. S2CID 144959406.
- Collar, Anna (2007). "Network Theory and Religious Innovation". Mediterranean Historical Review. 22 (1): 149–162. doi:10.1080/09518960701539372. S2CID 144519653.
- Constantelos, Demetrios J. (1964). "Paganism and the State in the Age of Justinian". The Catholic Historical Review. 50 (3): 372–80. JSTOR 25017472.
- Cooper, Kate (2014). "The Long Shadow of Constantine". Journal of Roman Studies. 104: 226–238. doi:10.1017/S0075435814001142. S2CID 162119392.
- Couzin, Robert (2014). "The Christian sarcophagus population of Rome". Journal of Roman Archaeology. 27: 275–303. doi:10.1017/S104775941400124X. S2CID 162418721.
- Drake, H. A. (2011). "Intolerance, Religious Violence, and Political Legitimacy in Late Antiquity". Journal of the American Academy of Religion. 79 (1). Oxford University Press: 193–235. doi:10.1093/jaarel/lfq064. JSTOR 23020391.
- Durand, John D. (1977). "Historical Estimates of World Population: An Evaluation". Population and Development Review. 3 (3): 253–296. doi:10.2307/1971891. JSTOR 1971891.
- Errington, R. Malcolm (1997). "Christian Accounts of the Religious Legislation of Theodosius I". Klio. 79 (2): 398–443. doi:10.1524/klio.1997.79.2.398. S2CID 159619838.
- Fahy, T. (1963). "The Council of Jerusalem". Irish Theological Quarterly. 30 (3): 232–261. doi:10.1177/002114006303000303. S2CID 170396423.
- Fernández, Samuel (1 April 2020). "Who Convened the First Council of Nicaea: Constantine or Ossius?". The Journal of Theological Studies. 71 (1): 196–211. doi:10.1093/jts/flaa036.
- Fousek, Jan; Kaše, Vojtěch; Mertel, Adam; Výtvarová, Eva; Chalupa, Aleš (2018). "Spatial constraints on the diffusion of religious innovations: The case of early Christianity in the Roman Empire". PLOS ONE. 13 (12) e0208744. Bibcode:2018PLoSO..1308744F. doi:10.1371/journal.pone.0208744. PMC 6306252. PMID 30586375.
- Fowden, Garth (1978). "Bishops and Temples in the Eastern Roman Empire A.D. 320–435". The Journal of Theological Studies. 29 (1). Oxford University Press: 53–78. doi:10.1093/jts/XXIX.1.53. JSTOR 23960254.
- Fredriksen, Paula (2006). "Mandatory retirement: Ideas in the study of Christian origins whose time has come to go". Sciences Religieuses. 35 (2): 231–246. doi:10.1177/000842980603500203. S2CID 144478198.
- Garnsey, Peter (1 January 1968). "Why Penalties Become Harsher: The Roman Case, Late Republic to Fourth Century Empire" (PDF). Natural Law Forum: 141–162.
- Gratsianskiy, Mikhail (2020). "Res divinae and res saeculares in the Perception of Pope Leo the Great: On the Prehistory of the Gelasian Theory". Vestnik Ancient History. 80 (4): 1103–1114. doi:10.31857/S032103910010638-4. S2CID 242367150.
- Gregory, Timothy E. (1986). "The Survival of Paganism in Christian Greece: A Critical Essay". The American Journal of Philology. 107 (2): 229–242. doi:10.2307/294605. JSTOR 294605.
- Hamlet, Ingomar (2004). "Theodosius I. And The Olympic Games". Nikephoros. 17: 53–75.
- Harnett, Benjamin (2017). "The Diffusion of the Codex". Classical Antiquity. 36 (2). University of California Press: 183–235. doi:10.1525/ca.2017.36.2.183. JSTOR 26362608.
- Hopkins, Keith (1998). "Christian Number and Its Implications". Journal of Early Christian Studies. 6 (2): 185–226. doi:10.1353/earl.1998.0035. S2CID 170769034.
- Irmscher, Johannes (1988). "Non-christians and sectarians under Justinian: the fate of the inculpated". Collection de l'Institut des Sciences et Techniques de l'Antiquité. 367 (1): 165–167.
- Jordan, David P. (1969). "Gibbon's "Age of Constantine" and the Fall of Rome". History and Theory. 8 (1): 71–96. doi:10.2307/2504190. JSTOR 2504190.
- Kraemer, Ross S. (1980). "The Conversion of Women to Ascetic Forms of Christianity". Signs. 6 (2): 298–307. doi:10.1086/493798. JSTOR 3173928. S2CID 143202380.
- Lenski, Noel (February–March 2003). "Review: Laying Down the Law. A Study of the Theodosian Code by John Matthews". The Classical Journal. 98 (3). The Classical Association of the Middle West and South, Inc.: 337–340.
- Lieu, Judith M. (1999). "The'attraction of women'in/to early Judaism and Christianity: gender and the politics of conversion". Journal for the Study of the New Testament. 21 (72): 5–22. doi:10.1177/0142064X9902107202. S2CID 144475695.
- MacCormack, Sabine (1997). "Sin, Citizenship, and the Salvation of Souls: The Impact of Christian Priorities on Late-Roman and Post-Roman Society". Comparative Studies in Society and History. 39 (4): 644–673. doi:10.1017/S0010417500020843. S2CID 144021596.
- MacMullen, Ramsay (1986). "What Difference Did Christianity Make?". Historia. 35 (3): 322–343.
- Marcos, M. (2013). "The Debate on Religious Coercion in Ancient Christianity". Chaos e Kosmos. 13: 1–16.
- Miller, David Harry (1974). "The Roman Revolution of the eighth century: a study of the ideological background of the Papal separation from Byzantium and alliance with the Franks". Mediaeval Studies. 36: 79–133. doi:10.1484/J.MS.2.306158.
- Ng, Esther Yue L. (October 2008). "Mirror Reading and Guardians of Women in the Early Roman Empire". Journal of Theological Studies. 59 (2): 679–695. doi:10.1093/jts/fln051.
- Novak, David M. (1979). "Constantine and the Senate: An Early Phase of the Christianization of the Roman Aristocracy". Ancient Society. 10: 271–310.
- Park, Jae-Eun (August 2013). "Lacking love or conveying love?: The fundamental roots of the Donatists and Augustine's nuanced treatment of them". The Reformed Theological Review. 72 (2): 103–121.
- Praet, Danny (1992–1993). "Explaining the Christianization of the Roman Empire. Older theories and recent developments". Sacris Erudiri. Jaarboek voor Godsdienstgeschiedenis. A Journal on the Inheritance of Early and Medieval Christianity. 23: 5–119.
- Rives, James B. (2010). "Graeco-Roman Religion in the Roman Empire: Old Assumptions and New Approaches". Currents in Biblical Research. 8 (2): 240–299. doi:10.1177/1476993X09347454. S2CID 161124650.
- Rausing, Gad (1995). "The Days of the Week and Dark Age Politics" (PDF). Fornvännen. 90 (4): 229–239.
- Runciman, W. G. (2004). "The Diffusion of Christianity in the Third Century AD as a Case-Study in the Theory of Cultural Selection". European Journal of Sociology. 45 (1): 3–21. doi:10.1017/S0003975604001365. S2CID 146353096.
- Salzman, Michele Renee (1993). "The Evidence for the Conversion of the Roman Empire to Christianity in Book 16 of the 'Theodosian Code". Historia: Zeitschrift für Alte Geschichte. 42 (3). Franz Steiner Verlag: 362–78. JSTOR 4436297.
- Salzman, Michelle Renee (2017). "From a Classical to a Christian City: Civic Euergetism and Charity in Late Antique Rome". Studies in Late Antiquity. 1 (1). doi:10.1525/sla.2017.1.1.65.
- Samson, Ross (1989). "Rural Slavery, Inscriptions, Archaeology and Marx: A Response to Ramsay Macmullen's "Late Roman Slavery"". Historia: Zeitschrift für Alte Geschichte. 38 (1): 99–110. JSTOR 4436092.
- Sanmark, Alexandra (2004). "1". Power and Conversion. A Comparative Study of Christianization in Scandinavia. The University of Uppsala. ISBN 978-91-506-1739-9.
- Schor, Adam M. (2009). "Conversion by the numbers: Benefits and pitfalls of quantitative modelling in the study of early Christian growth". Journal of Religious History. 33 (4): 472–498. doi:10.1111/j.1467-9809.2009.00826.x.
- Schuddeboom, Feyo L. (2017). "The Conversion of Temples in Rome". Journal of Late Antiquity. 10 (1). Johns Hopkins University Press: 166–186. doi:10.1353/jla.2017.0005. S2CID 165142999.
- Stark, Rodney (1995). "Reconstructing the Rise of Christianity: The Role of Women". Sociology of Religion. 56 (3): 229–244. doi:10.2307/3711820. JSTOR 3711820.
- Tate, Joshua C. (2008). "Christianity and the Legal Status of Abandoned Children in the Later Roman Empire". Journal of Law and Religion. 24 (1): 123–141. doi:10.1017/S0748081400001958. S2CID 146901894.
- Testa, Rita Lizzi (2007). "Christian emperor, vestal virgins and priestly colleges: Reconsidering the end of roman paganism". Antiquité tardive. 15: 251–262. doi:10.1484/J.AT.2.303121.
- Trombley, Frank R. (1985). "Paganism in the Greek World at the End of Antiquity: The Case of Rural Anatolia and Greece". The Harvard Theological Review. 78 (3/4): 327–352. doi:10.1017/S0017816000012426. JSTOR 1509694. S2CID 162986189.
- Tulloch, Janet (2004). "Art and Archaeology as an Historical Resource for the Study of Women in Early Christianity: An Approach for Analyzing Visual Data". Feminist Theology. 12 (3): 277–304. doi:10.1177/096673500401200303. S2CID 145361724.
- Van Dam, Raymond (1985). "From Paganism to Christianity at Late Antique Gaza". Viator. 16: 1–20. doi:10.1484/J.VIATOR.2.301417.
- Westerholm, Stephen (Spring 2015). "The New Perspective on Paul in Review". Direction. 44 (1): 4–15.
- Yasin, Ann Marie (2005). "Funerary Monuments and Collective Identity: From Roman Family to Christian Community". The Art Bulletin. 87 (3): 433–457. doi:10.1080/00043079.2005.10786254. S2CID 162331640.

=== Online ===
- Fredriksen, Paula. "Spread of Christianity". The Great Appeal. PBS.
- Koester, Helmut (April 1998). "The Great Appeal". The Great Appeal.
- Meeks, Wayne A. (April 1998). "Christians on Love". The Great Appeal. PBS.
- Roux, Marie. "Codex Theodosianus XVI.10.12 (8th November 392 CE)". Judaism and Rome. European Research Council.
- Woods, David. "Theodosius I (379–395 A.D.)". De Imperatoribus Romanis.
