= Little Peace of the Church =

3rd-century Roman Empire Christianity

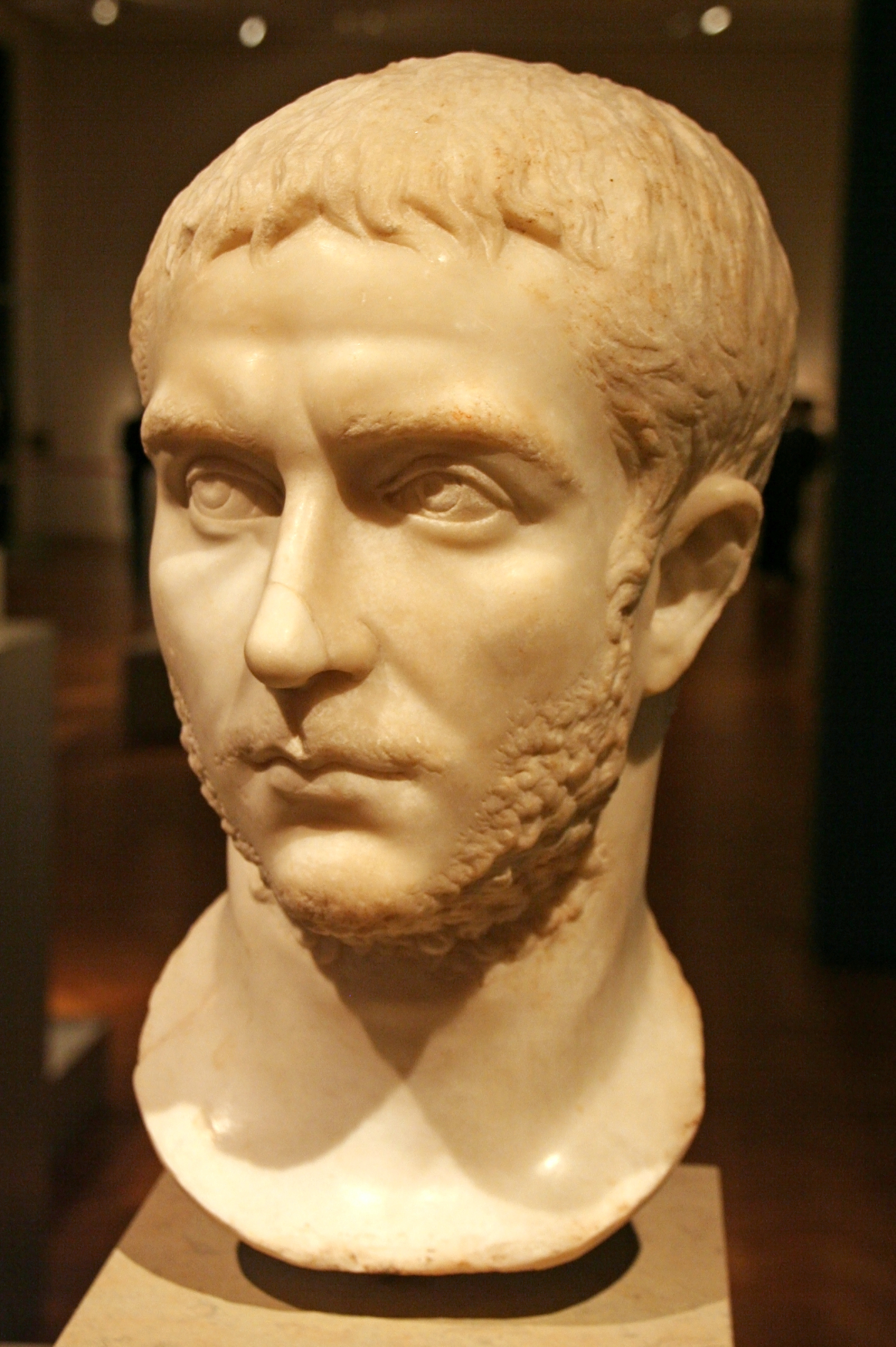
Gallienus (253–60 AD, Altes Museum)

The "Little Peace of the Church" was a roughly 40-year period in the latter 3rd century in the history of the Roman Empire during which Christianity flourished without official suppression from the central government. It is particularly associated with the reign of Gallienus (253–268), who issued the first official declaration of tolerance regarding Christians. Among the series of imperial edicts that halted acts of persecution against Christians, one addressed to the bishops of Egypt has survived, recognizing places of worship and cemeteries as ecclesiastical property and restoring them to Christian ownership. The Church for the first time even asked a Roman emperor to arbitrate an internal dispute. In 272, after Paul of Samosata was accused of heresy but refused to be deposed as bishop of Antioch, Aurelian ruled in favour of his successor, who was in good standing with the church hierarchy.

The "little" peace of the Church, described primarily by Eusebius, preceded the "peace of the Church," which ushered in by the conversion of Constantine the Great.

== Co-existence ==
During this time, Christian communities became more integrated into Roman society in the provinces. The possibility of integration had been recognized by some Christian intellectuals as early as the 2nd century. Tatian, a Syrian convert to Christianity, maintained that all humanity should share one code of law and one political organization, an attitude that was conducive to coexistence with the empire. The goal of unity was reflected in the Constitutio Antoniniana, which in 212 AD had extended universal citizenship to all free inhabitants of the empire. The intellectual practices associated with the Second Sophistic were adopted by Christian apologists, who drew on the rhetorical techniques of the educated classes to argue that they posed no threat to the social order. The "little peace" helped consolidate the development of Christian discourse in the Hellenistic manner. Conditions were also more favorable for attracting Christian converts.

Eusebius of Caesarea, who grew up during the peace, contrasted it with the time in which he wrote:

It is beyond our ability to describe in a suitable manner the extent and nature of the glory and freedom with which the word of piety toward the God of the universe, proclaimed to the world through Christ, was honored among all men, both Greeks and barbarians, before the persecution in our day."

== End of peace ==
This peaceful co-existence came to an end during the reign of Diocletian (284–311). Diocletian's efforts to promote stability and unity for the Empire following the Crisis of the Third Century included the enforcement of religious conformity since citizens expressed their loyalty through participation in the public religion of Rome. Christians were viewed as incapable of acting on their obligations as Roman citizens, and his edict in 303 resulted in the Great Persecution. Galerius halted the persecutions with the edict of toleration in 311, which made it a duty for Christians to support the state (res publica) through their own forms of worship.

== See also ==
- Imperial cult (ancient Rome)
- Persecution of Christians in the Roman Empire
- Religio licita

== Sources ==
- Butcher, Kevin (2003). Roman Syria and the Near East. Getty Publications. ISBN 978-0-89236-715-3.
- Digeser, Elizabeth DePalma (2000). The Making of a Christian Empire: Lactantius & Rome. Cornell University Press. ISBN 978-0-8014-3594-2.
- Drake, H. A. (2002). Constantine and the Bishops: The Politics of Intolerance. Johns Hopkins University Press. ISBN 978-0-8018-7104-7.
- Frend, W. H. C. (2006). "Persecutions: Genesis and Legacy". In Mitchell, Margaret M.; Young, Frances M.; Bowie, K. Scott (eds.). Cambridge History of Christianity: Volume 1, Origins to Constantine. Vol. 1. Cambridge University Press. ISBN 978-0-521-81239-9.
