= Religious persecution in the Roman Empire =

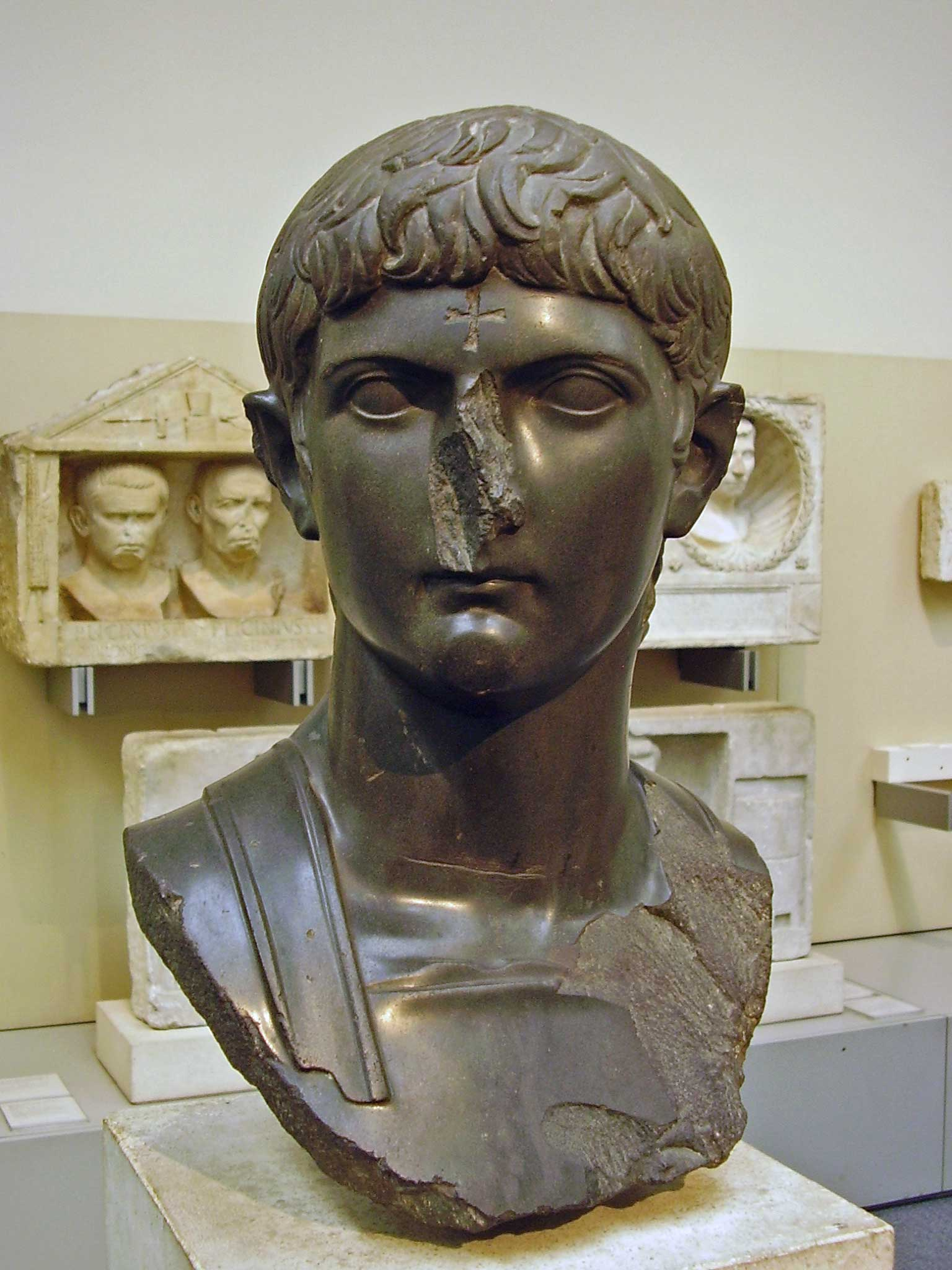
Bust of Germanicus defaced by Christians

As the Roman Republic, and later the Roman Empire, expanded, it came to include people from a variety of cultures, and religions. The worship of an ever increasing number of deities was tolerated and accepted. The government, and the Romans in general, tended to be tolerant towards most religions and religious practices. Some religions were banned for political reasons rather than dogmatic zeal, and other rites which involved human sacrifice were banned.

When Christianity became the state church of the Roman Empire, it came to accept that it was the Roman emperor's duty to use secular power to enforce religious unity. Anyone within the church who did not subscribe to catholic Christianity was seen as a threat to the dominance and purity of the "one true faith" and they saw it as their right to defend this by all means at their disposal. This led to persecution of pagans by the Christian authorities and populace after its institution as the state religion.

== Under Roman Paganism ==
=== Religious tolerance and intolerance ===
The Roman Empire typically tolerated other religions insofar as they conformed to Roman notions of what proper religion meant and if their deities could be mapped onto Roman deities. Otherwise, the Romans produced a series of persecutions of offending and nonconforming religions.

In the early 3rd century, Cassius Dio outlined the Roman imperial policy towards religious tolerance:

You should not only worship the divine everywhere and in every way in accordance with our ancestral traditions, but also force all others to honour it. Those who attempt to distort our religion with strange rites you should hate and punish, not only for the sake of the gods … but also because such people, by bringing in new divinities, persuade many folks to adopt foreign practices, which lead to conspiracies, revolts, and factions, which are entirely unsuitable for monarch".

— Dio Cassius, Hist. Rom. LII.36.1–2

=== The Bacchanals ===
In 186 BC, the Roman senate issued a decree that severely restricted the Bacchanals, ecstatic rites celebrated in honor of Dionysus. Livy records that this persecution was due to the fact that "there was nothing wicked, nothing flagitious, that had not been practiced among them" and that a "greater number were executed than thrown into prison; indeed, the multitude of men and women who suffered in both ways, was very considerable". Livy describes the Roman perceptions of the Bacchanals sect (which he shared) in his Livy Ab Urbe Condita Libri (38.9-18), among these descriptions being:

The mischief would not be serious, if they had only lost their manhood through their debauchery - the disgrace would fall mainly upon themselves - and had kept from open outrage and secret treason. Never has there been such a gigantic evil in the commonwealth, or one which has affected greater numbers or caused more numerous crimes. Whatever instances of lust, treachery, or crime have occurred during these last years, have originated, you may be perfectly certain, in that shrine of unhallowed rites. They have not yet disclosed all the criminal objects of their conspiracy. So far, their impious association confines itself to individual crimes; it has not yet strength enough to destroy the commonwealth. But the evil is creeping stealthily on, and growing day by day; it is already too great to limit its action to individual citizens; it looks to be supreme in the State.

On a bronze tablet found in Tiriolo, Italy in 1640, a Roman decree reads:

Let none of them be minded to have a shrine of Bacchus ... Let no man, whether Roman citizen or Latin ally or other ally, be minded to go to a meeting of Bacchantes ... Let no man be a priest. Let no-one, man or woman, be a master. Let none of them be minded to keep a common fund. Let no-one be minded to make any man or woman an official or a temporary official. Henceforth let no-one be minded to conspire, collude, plot or make vows in common among themselves or to pledge loyalty to each other.
If there are any who transgress against the decrees set out above, a capital charge is to be brought against them. – Decree of the Senate Concerning the Rites of Bacchus.

=== Druids ===
Druids were seen as essentially non-Roman: a prescript of Augustus forbade Roman citizens to practice "druidical" rites. Pliny reports that under Tiberius the druids were suppressed—along with diviners and physicians—by a decree of the Senate, and Claudius forbade their rites completely in 54 AD. Druids were alleged to practice human sacrifice, a practice abhorrent to the Romans. Pliny the Elder (23–79 AD) wrote "It is beyond calculation how great is the debt owed to the Romans, who swept away the monstrous rites, in which to kill a man was the highest religious duty and for him to be eaten a passport to health."

=== Judaism ===
Tiberius forbade Judaism in Rome, and Claudius expelled them from the city. However, the passage of Suetonius is ambiguous: "Because the Jews at Rome caused continuous disturbances at the instigation of Chrestus he [Claudius] expelled them from the city".

The Crisis under Caligula (37–41) has been proposed as the "first open break between Rome and the Jews", but the problems were already evident during the Census of Quirinius in AD 6 and under Sejanus (before 31).

After a series of Jewish–Roman wars (66–135), Hadrian changed the name of Judea province to Syria Palaestina and Jerusalem to Aelia Capitolina in an attempt to erase the historical ties of the Jewish people to the region. In addition, after 70, Jews and Jewish proselytes were only allowed to practice their religion if they paid the Fiscus Judaicus, and after 135 were barred from Aelia Capitolina except for the day of Tisha B'Av.

=== Manichaeism ===
The first official reaction and legislation against Manichaeism from the Roman state took place under Diocletian. In an official edict called the De Maleficiis et Manichaeis (302) compiled in the Collatio Legum Mosaicarum et Romanarum and addressed to the proconsul of Africa, Diocletian wrote

We have heard that the Manichaens [...] have set up new and hitherto unheard-of sects in opposition to the older creeds so that they might cast out the doctrines vouchsafed to us in the past by the divine favour for the benefit of their own depraved doctrine. They have sprung forth very recently like new and unexpected monstrosities among the race of the Persians - a nation still hostile to us - and have made their way into our empire, where they are committing many outrages, disturbing the tranquility of our people and even inflicting grave damage to the civic communities. We have cause to fear that with the passage of time they will endeavour, as usually happens, to infect the modest and tranquil of an innocent nature with the damnable customs and perverse laws of the Persians as with the poison of a malignant (serpent) ... We order that the authors and leaders of these sects be subjected to severe punishment, and, together with their abominable writings, burnt in the flames. We direct their followers, if they continue recalcitrant, shall suffer capital punishment, and their goods be forfeited to the imperial treasury. And if those who have gone over to that hitherto unheard-of, scandalous and wholly infamous creed, or to that of the Persians, are persons who hold public office, or are of any rank or of superior social status, you will see to it that their estates are confiscated and the offenders sent to the (quarry) at Phaeno or the mines at Proconnesus. And in order that this plague of iniquity shall be completely extirpated from this our most happy age, let your devotion hasten to carry out our orders and commands.

=== Christianity ===
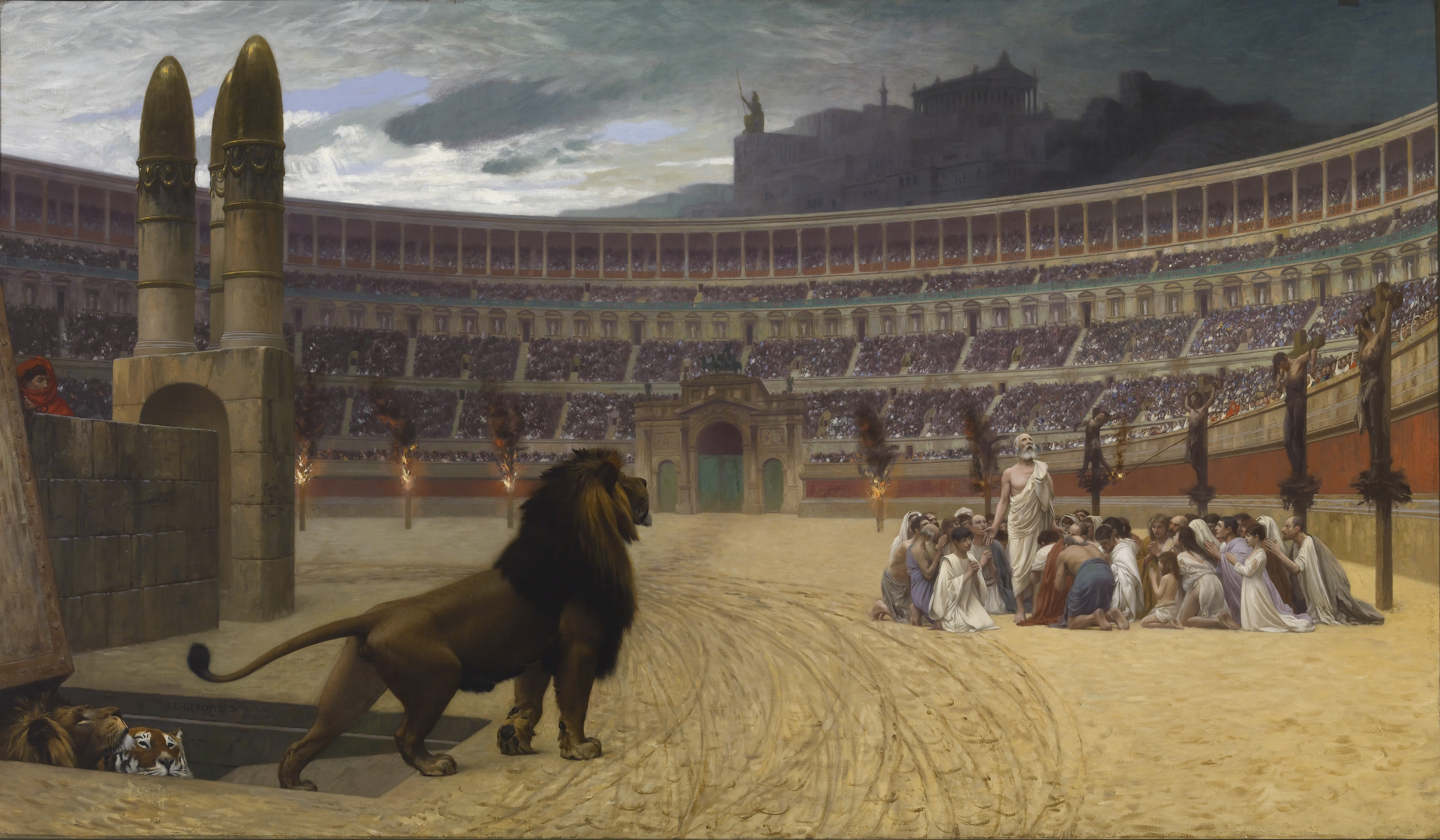
The Christian Martyrs' Last Prayer, by Jean-Léon Gérôme (1883)

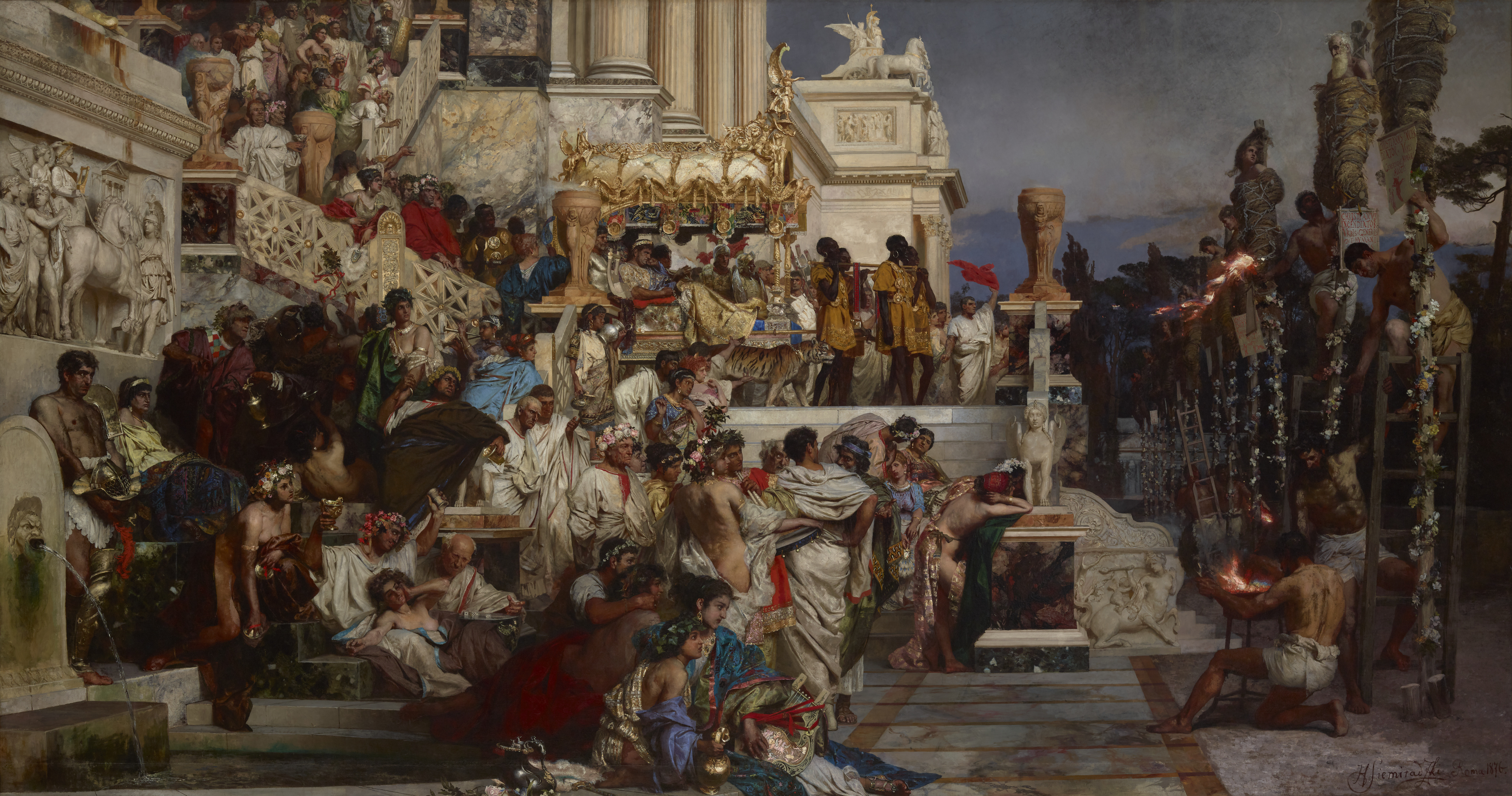
Nero's Torches, by Henryk Siemiradzki (1876). According to Tacitus, Nero used Christians as human torches

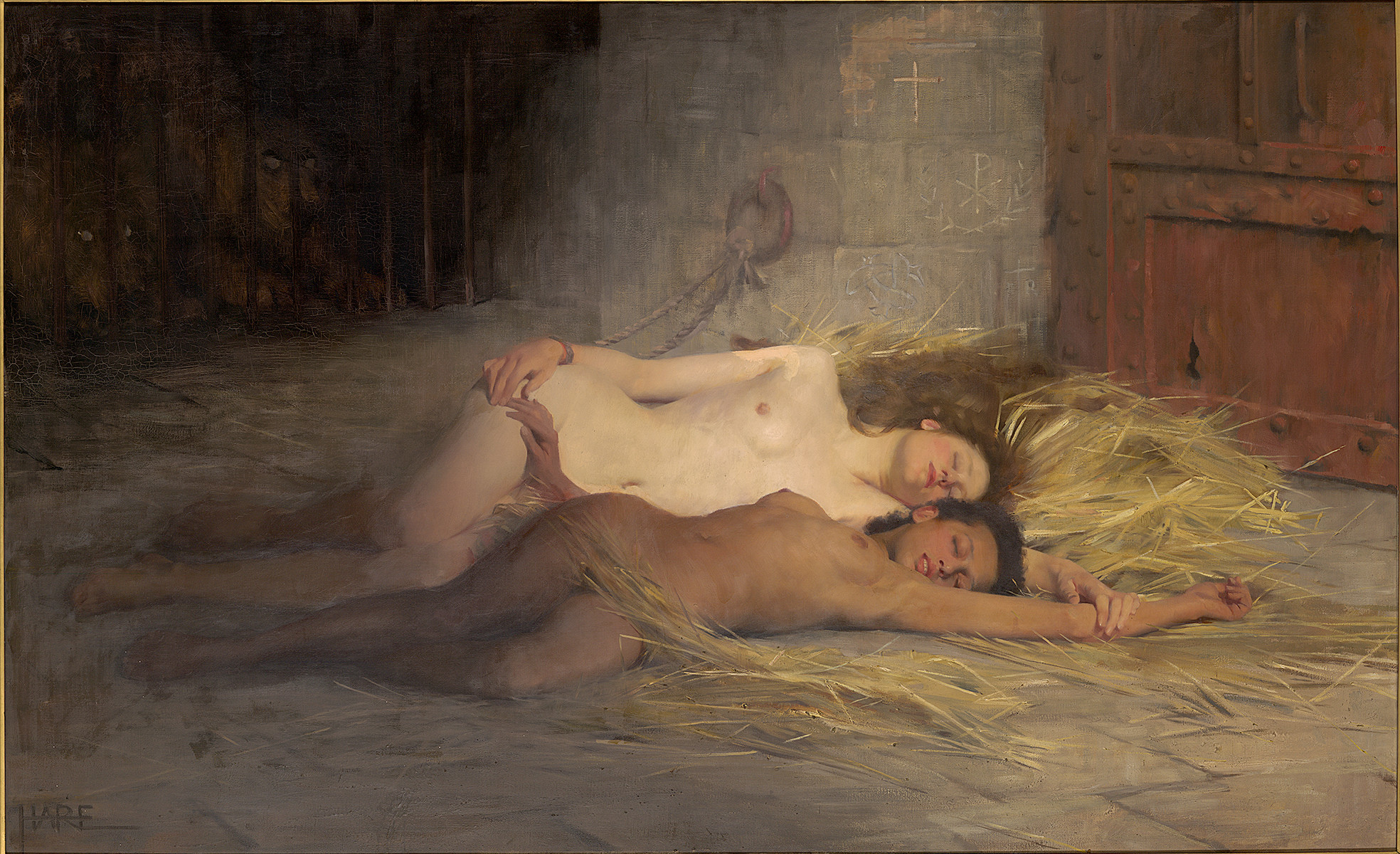
The Victory of Faith, by Saint George Hare, depicts two Christians in the eve of their damnatio ad bestias

According to Jacob Neusner, the only religion in antiquity that was persistently outlawed and subject of systematic persecution was not Judaism, but Christianity. Christian martyrs were a significant part of Early Christianity, until the Peace of the Church in 313.

Suetonius mentions passingly that "[during Nero's reign p]unishments were also inflicted on the Christians, a sect professing a new and mischievous religious belief" in so far as there are no crimes described.

Tacitus reports that after the Great Fire of Rome in 64 some in the population held Nero responsible and that to diffuse blame, he targeted and blamed the Christians (or Chrestians).

The Romans tended towards syncretism, seeing the same gods under different names in different places of the Empire. This being so, they were generally tolerant and accommodating towards new deities and the religious experiences of other peoples who formed part of their wider Empire. This general tolerance was not extended to religions that were hostile to the state nor any that claimed exclusive rights to religious beliefs and practice. By its very nature the exclusive faith of the Jews and Christians set them apart from other people, but whereas the former group was in the main contained within a single national, ethnic grouping, the latter was active and successful in seeking converts for the new religion and made universal claims not limited to a single geographical area.

The Masoretic Text, the earliest surviving copy of which dates from the 9th century AD, teaches that "the Gods of the gentiles are nothing", the corresponding passage in the Greek Septuagint, used by the early Christian Church, asserted that "all the gods of the heathens are devils." The same gods whom the Romans believed had protected and blessed their city and its wider empire during the many centuries they had been worshipped were now demonized by the early Christian Church.

The Romans protected the integrity of religions practiced by communities under their rule, seeing it as inherently correct to honor one's ancestral traditions; for this reason the Romans for a long time tolerated the highly exclusive Jewish sect, even though some Romans despised it. It was not so with the early Christian community which was perceived at times to be a new and intrinsically destabilising influence and a threat to the peace of Rome, a religio illicita. The pagans who attributed the misfortunes of Rome and its wider Empire to the rise of Christianity, and who could only see a restoration by a return to the old ways, were faced by the Christian Church that had set itself apart from that faith and was unwilling to dilute what it held to be the religion of the "one true God".

After the initial conflicts between the state and the new emerging religion during which early Christians were periodically subject to intense persecution, Gallienus issued an edict of toleration in 259 for all religious creeds including Christianity, a re-affirmation of the policy of Alexander Severus.

== Under Christianity ==
The first episodes started late in the reign of Constantine the Great, when he ordered the pillaging and the tearing down of some pagan temples. The first anti-pagan laws by the Christian state started with Constantine's son Constantius II, who was an unwavering opponent of paganism; he ordered the closing of all pagan temples, forbade pagan sacrifices under pain of death, and removed the traditional Altar of Victory from the Senate. Under his reign ordinary Christians started vandalizing many of the ancient pagan temples, tombs and monuments.

From 361 until 375, paganism received a relative tolerance, until three Emperors, Gratian, Valentinian II and Theodosius I, under bishop of Milan Saint Ambrose's major influence, reprised and escalated the persecution. Under Ambrose's zealous pressure, Theodosius issued the infamous 391 "Theodosian decrees," a declaration of war on paganism, the Altar of Victory was removed again by Gratian, Vestal Virgins disbanded, access to pagan temples prohibited.

== See also ==
- Christianization
- Hypatia of Alexandria
- Religion in ancient Rome

== Bibliography ==
- H.A.Drake, Lambs into Lions: explaining early Christian intolerance, Past and Present 153 (1996), 3–36, Oxford Journals
- Peter Garnsey, Religious Toleration in Classical Antiquity, in: W.J.Sheils (Ed.), Persecution and Toleration, Studies in Church History 21 (1984), 1–27
- Ramsay MacMullen, Christianizing the Roman Empire: AD 100-400 (1989)
- ——, Christianity and Paganism in the Fourth to Eighth Centuries (1997) ISBN 0-300-08077-8
