= Restoration of paganism from Julian until Valens =

The restoration of paganism from Julian until Valens was a brief period, from 361 until 375, of relative tolerance towards pagans in the Roman Empire. In the late Roman Empire, it was preceded by a period of persecutions under Emperor Constantius II and was followed by those of Emperor Gratian. The attempt of Emperor Julian the Apostate (reigned in 361—363) to restore pagan worship in the empire, while ultimately a policy failure, restored security to pagans. His immediate successors (from 363 until 375), under the reigns of Jovian, Valens and Valentinian I, had a policy of relative religious toleration towards paganism.

== Background ==
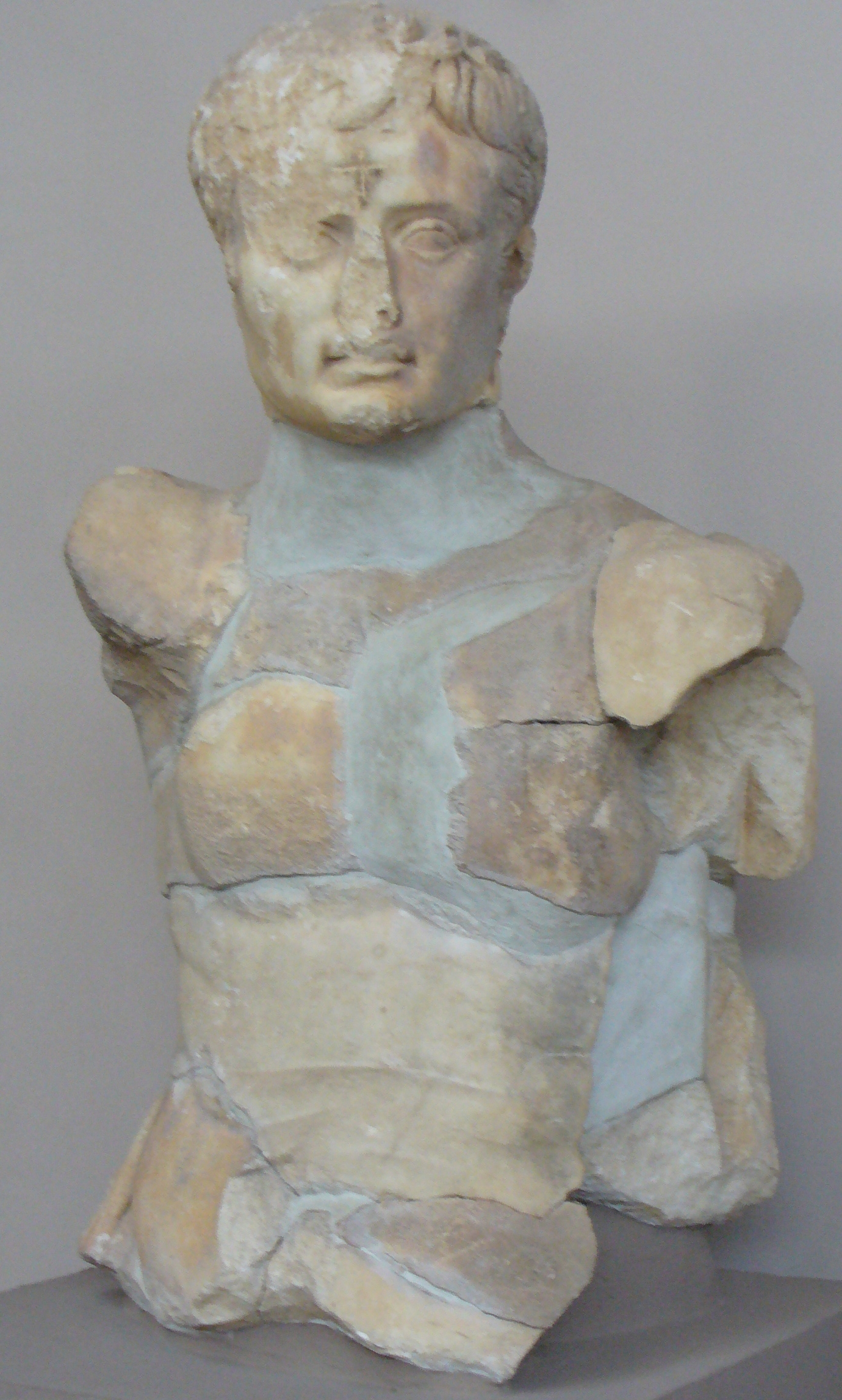
A cult statue of the deified Augustus, disfigured by a Christian cross carved into the emperor's forehead.

Julian was Roman co-emperor since 355, and ruled solely for 18 months 361–363. Known to Christians as "Julian the Apostate", he was a nephew of Constantine the Great and received a Christian training. Following the death of Constantine, he witnessed the assassination of his father, brother and other family members by the guards of the imperial palace. Rightly or wrongly, he blamed this brutal act on the Emperor Constantius II and by association, to Christians in general. This antipathy deepened when Constantius executed Julian's only remaining brother in 354AD. After childhood, Julian was educated by Hellenists and was attracted to the teachings of neoplatonists and the old religions. Upon becoming emperor, Julian decided to restore paganism, the ancient Roman religion, while reforming it in the hope of making it the driving force behind the empire. Julian's religious beliefs were syncretic and he was an initiate of at least three mystery religions. But Julian's religious open-mindedness did not extend to Christianity due to its belief that it had an exclusive perspective on religious truth. Believing itself to be the "only true religion", Christianity was fundamentally incompatible with syncretic paganism.

As emperor, Julian sought to turn the tide in the attempted suppression of non-Christian religions. Julian allowed religious freedom and avoided any form of actual compulsion. The Christian Sozomen acknowledges that Julian did not compel Christians to offer sacrifice nor did he allow the people to commit any act of injustice towards the Christians or insult them. However, no Christian was allowed to teach or study the ancient classical authors, "Let them keep to Matthew and Luke", thus ending any chance they had of a professional career. He did not believe Christians could honestly teach subjects replete with allusions to Greek deities whose existence they denied. The Jewish historian and theologian Jacob Neusner writes: "It was only after the near catastrophe of Julian's reversion to paganism that the Christian emperors systematically legislated against paganism so as to destroy it."

"In the eighteen brief months that he ruled between 361 and 363, Julian did not persecute [Christians], as a hostile tradition contends. But he did make clear that the partnership between Rome and Christian bishops forged by Constantine and maintained, despite conflicts over goals, by his son Constantius II, was now at an end, replaced by a government that defined its interests and those of Christianity as antithetical."

== Religious toleration under Jovian, Valentinian and Valens ==
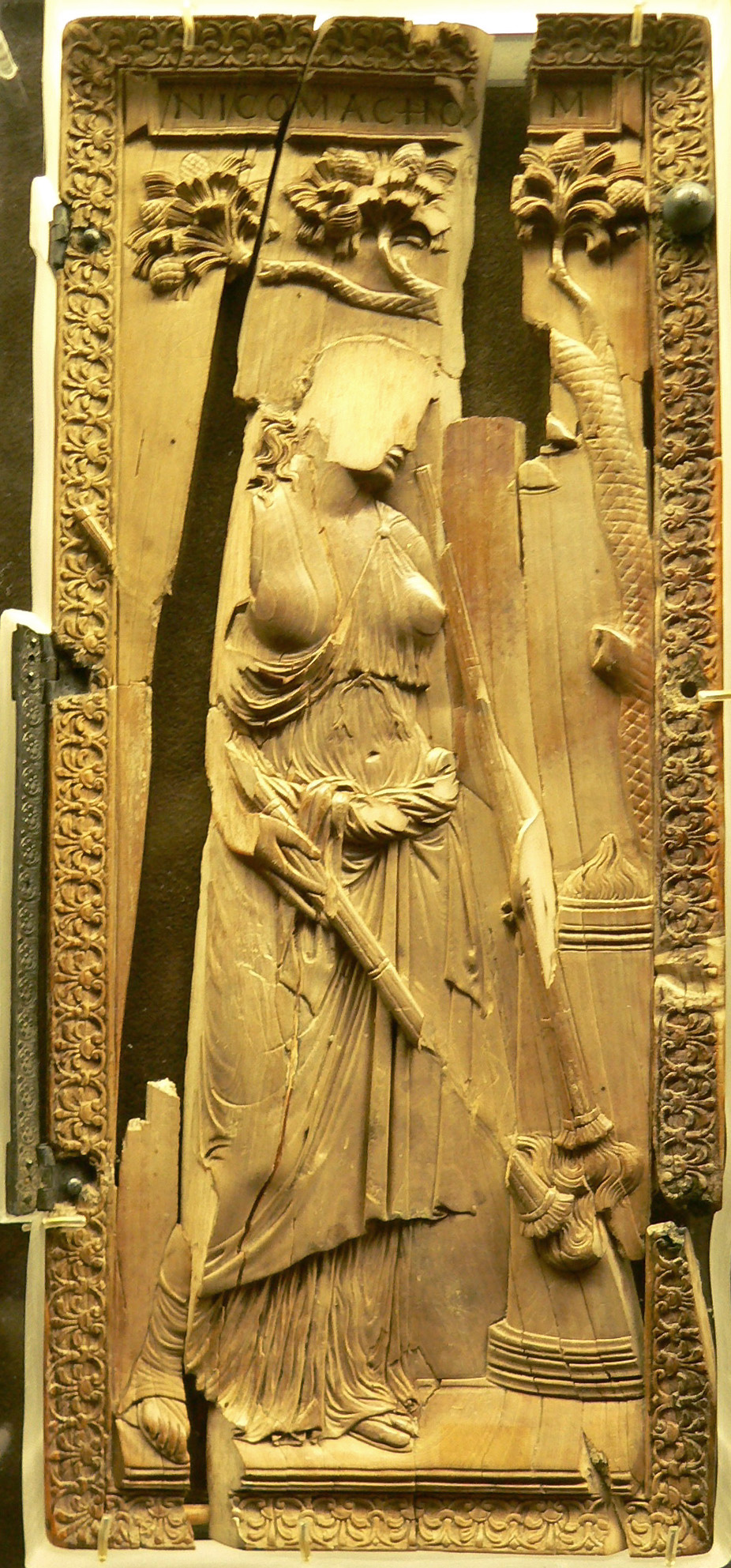
Ivory diptych of a priestess of Ceres, ca 400: it was defaced and thrown in a well at Abbey of Montier-en-Der.

Julian's successor – Jovian – seems to have instituted a policy of religious toleration which avoided the extremes of Julian. Under Valentinian and Valens, this period of religious toleration continued. Pagan writers praised both emperors for their liberal religious policies. Valentinian, who ruled in the west, seems to have only been a halfhearted Christian as he avoided attending his inaugural ceremony by twenty-four hours in order to avoid an inauspicious day (the intercalary day of the bissextile year). Valentinian and Valens granted complete toleration for all cults at the beginning of their reign in 364. Valentinian even allowed the performance of nocturnal sacrifices, which had been previously prohibited due to the attempt of some people to practice unlawful divination under the cover of the night, after the proconsul of Greece appealed to him. Valentinian also confirmed the rights and privileges of the pagan priests and confirmed the right of pagans to be the exclusive caretakers of their temples. Valens, who ruled in the east, was an Arian and was too engaged with fighting against Orthodox Christians to bother much with the pagans. In both west and east, severe laws were once again passed prohibiting private divination. Due to the over-zealousness of the populace to stop harmful divination, the haruspices and augurs began to be afraid to show themselves in public. This led the emperors to formally authorize the practice of official and lawful divination by law in 371.
