= Elizabeth Digeser =

American academic and historian

Elizabeth DePalma Digeser is an American scholar of Ancient Roman history, with an emphasis on late antiquity. After earning a B.A. in Psychology at the State University of New York at Buffalo in 1981 and a M.A. in Psychology at the Johns Hopkins University in 1983, she moved to the University of California, Santa Barbara, where she earned her Ph.D. in History (her dissertation entitled “Lactantius, Constantine, and the Roman "Res Publica"" was directed by Harold A. Drake.

After completing her Ph.D. in 1996, she accepted a call to St. Norbert College in De Pere, Wisconsin as assistant professor of history. She held a Mellon postdoctoral fellowship in the humanities at Cornell University from 1996-97. She accepted a call to McGill University in Montreal, Canada as an assistant professor in 1999 and received promotion to associate professor in 2003.

In 2004, she accepted a position as associate professor at the University of California, Santa Barbara and was promoted to full professor in 2011 and served as chair of the History Department from 2012-2015.

Digeser’s work focuses on the social and culture history of the Roman Empire, especially the 3rd-5th century CE. She has published extensively in scholarly journals and books. She played a central role in founding the journal Studies in Late Antiquity in 2017 (published by the University of California Press) and served as the first editor.

== Works ==
- Digeser, Elizabeth DePalma (2000). The Making of a Christian Empire: Lactantius & Rome. Ithaca: Cornell University Press. ISBN 978-0-8014-3594-2.
- Digeser, Elizabeth DePalma (2012). A Threat to Public Piety: Christians, Platonists, and the Great Persecution. Ithaca: Cornell University Press. ISBN 978-0-8014-4181-3. JSTOR 10.7591/j.ctt7z6gq.
- The Rhetoric of Power in Late Antiquity: Religion and Politics in Byzantium, Europe and the Early Islamic World, ed. with Justin Stephens and R. M. Frakes. London: I. B. Tauris, 2010 (Bloomsbury).
- (ed. with R. M. Frakes) Religious Identity in Late Antiquity (Toronto: Edgar Kent, 2006)
