= Religious policies of Constantius II =

The religious policies of Constantius II were a mixture of toleration for some pagan practices and repression for other pagan practices. He also sought to advance the Arian or Semi-Arianian set of beliefs, now generally regarded as heresy, within Christianity. These policies may be contrasted with the religious policies of his father, Constantine the Great, whose Catholic orthodoxy was espoused in the Nicene Creed and who largely tolerated paganism in the Roman Empire. Constantius also sought to repress Judaism.

== Policies concerning paganism ==
Laws dating from the 350s prescribed the death penalty for those who performed or attended pagan sacrifices, and for the worshipping of idols. Pagan temples were shut down, and the Altar of Victory was removed from the Senate meeting house. There were also frequent episodes of ordinary Christians destroying, pillaging and desecrating many ancient pagan temples, tombs and monuments. Paganism was still popular among the population at the time. The emperor's policies were passively resisted by many governors and magistrates.

=== Anti-paganism acts ===
Constantius II's legislation began with the banning of the pagan practice of sacrifice. This was in keeping with what his personal maxim was: "Cesset superstitio; sacrificiorum aboleatur insania" (Let superstition cease; let the folly of sacrifices be abolished). According to Libanius, Constantius was effectively under the control of others who inspired him to end pagan sacrifices.

With the collapse of official government sanctioned pagan rites, private cults attempted to infiltrate the temples. In the year 353 Constantius prohibited pagan sacrifice under the penalty of death. He also shut down some temples, forbade access to them, and ended their subsidies of public taxes.

Consistent with Christian theology, Constantius carried out an active campaign against magicians, astrologers and other diviners. This may also be due to his becoming fearful that others might use these means to make someone else emperor.

In 357 Constantius removed the Altar of Victory in the Senate house because of the complaints of some Christian Senators. This altar had been installed by Augustus in 29 BC; each Senator had traditionally made a sacrifice upon the altar before entering the Senate house. This altar was later restored, either silently, soon after Constantius' departure, or by the emperor Julian.

The pretender Magnentius killed Constans. Although he used Christian symbols on his coins, he revoked the anti-paganism legislation of Constans and even permitted the celebration of nocturnal sacrifices. Three years later, in the year 353, Constantius defeated Magnentius and once again forbade the performance of the rituals. This law seems to have had little effect as we find Constantius once again legislating against paganism in 356. Constantius now declared that anyone found guilty of attending sacrifices or of worshipping idols would be executed. It appears the magistrates were uncomfortable with carrying out this law; it was largely ignored.

=== Relative moderation ===
The government's policies could not be rigidly executed due to the strength of paganism among the population. No matter what the imperial edicts declared in their fearful threats, the vast numbers of pagans, and the passive resistance of pagan governors and magistrates rendered them largely impotent in their application. Consequently, the emperor never attempted to disband the various Roman priestly colleges or the Vestal Virgins, He never acted against the various pagan schools. He even ordered the election of a priest for Africa. Also, he remained as the pontifex maximus until his death, and was deified by the Roman Senate after his death. The effects of policy were enough to contribute to a widespread trend towards Christian conversion, though not enough to make paganism extinct. The relative moderation of Constantius' actions toward paganism is reflected by the fact that it was not until over 20 years after Constantius' death, during the reign of Gratian, that any pagan senators protested their religion's treatment.

=== Actions of ordinary Christians ===
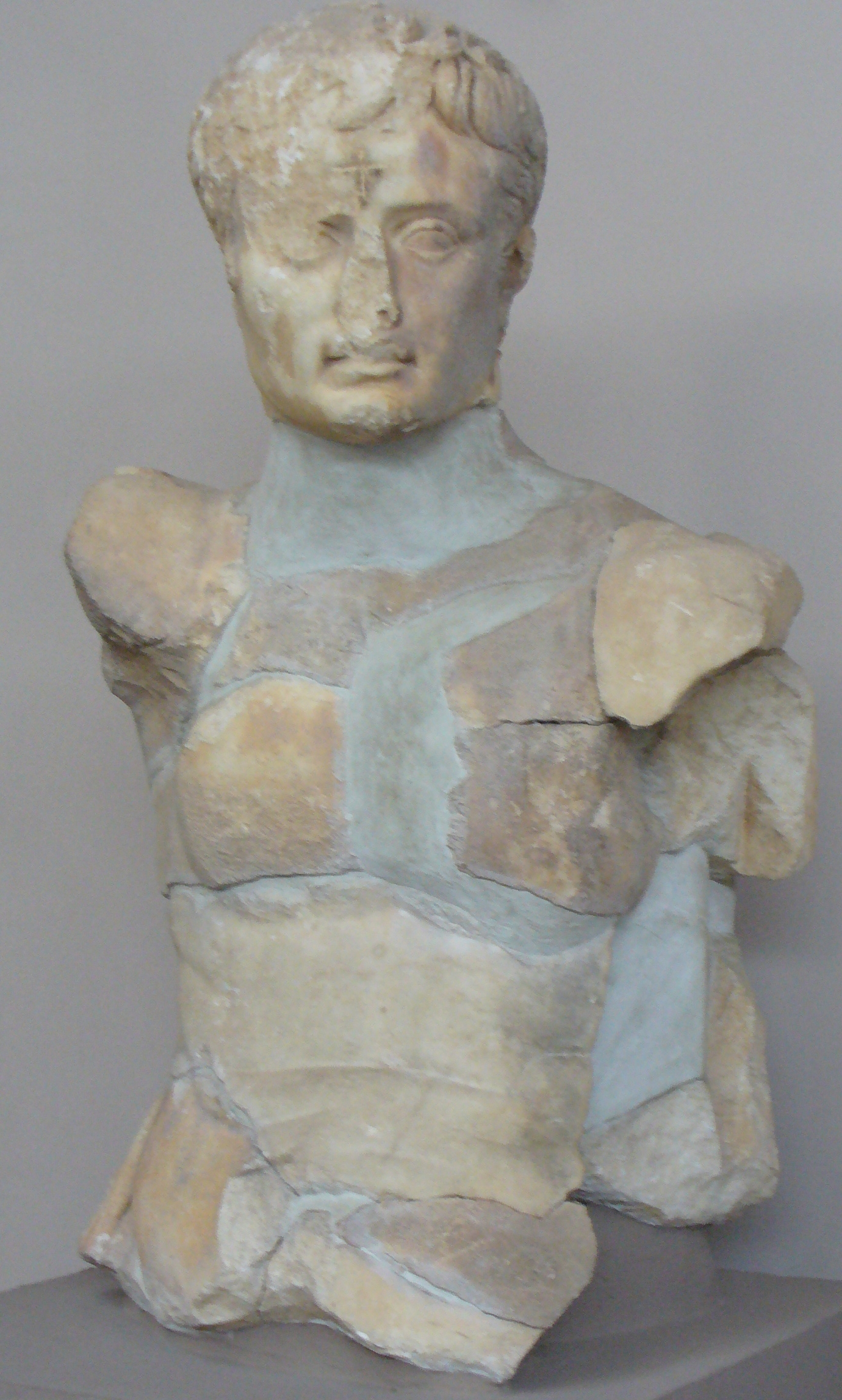
A cult statue of the deified Augustus, disfigured by a Christian cross carved into the emperor's forehead.

Some Christians encouraged the emperor to take even more extreme measures in their zeal to stamp out paganism, e.g. in the aftermath of the abolition of sacrifices. Firmicus Maternus, a convert to Christianity, urged: "Paganism, most holy emperors, must be utterly destroyed and blotted out, and disciplined by the severest enactments of your edicts, lest the deadly delusion of the presumption continue to stain the Roman world" and "How fortunate you are that God, whose agents you are, has reserved for you the destruction of idolatry and the ruin of profane temples."

Constantius enacted another law that exacted a fine from those who were guilty of vandalizing sites holy to pagans and placed the care of these monuments and tombs under the pagan priests.

== Policies concerning Christianity ==
Although often considered an Arian, Constantius ultimately preferred a third, compromise version that lay somewhere in between Arianism and the Nicene Creed, retrospectively called Semi-Arianism. During his reign he attempted to mold the Christian church to follow this compromise position, convening several Christian councils. The most notable of these were the Council of Rimini and its twin at Seleucia, which met in 359 and 360 respectively. The results of these Christian councils were overturned by the Council of Constantinople in 381, held under Emperor Theodosius I. Those who won the struggle defined what is "orthodox", and wrote the histories. "Unfortunately for his memory the theologians whose advice he took were ultimately discredited and the malcontents whom he pressed to conform emerged victorious," writes the historian A.H.M. Jones. "The great councils of 359–60 are therefore not reckoned ecumenical in the tradition of the church, and Constantius II is not remembered as a restorer of unity, but as a heretic who arbitrarily imposed his will on the church."

Christian-related edicts issued by Constantius (by himself or with others) included:

- Exemption from compulsory public service for the clergy
- Exemption from compulsory public service for the sons of clergy
- Tax exemptions for clergy and their servants, and later for their family
- Tax exemption for land owned by the church, but clergy-owned land not tax exempt.
- Clergy and the issue of private property
- Bishops exempted from being tried in secular courts
- Christian prostitutes only able to be bought by members of the clergy or other state-approved Christians

== Policies concerning Judaism ==
Judaism faced some severe restrictions under Constantius, who seems to have followed an anti-Jewish policy in line with that of his father. Early in his reign, Constantius issued a double edict in concert with his brothers limiting the ownership of slaves by Jewish people and banning marriages between Jews and Christian women. A later edict issued by Constantius after becoming sole emperor decreed that a person who was proven to have converted from Christianity to Judaism would have all of his property confiscated by the state. However, Constantius' actions in this regard may not have been so much to do with Jewish religion as with Jewish business—apparently, privately owned Jewish businesses were often in competition with state-owned businesses. As a result, Constantius may have sought to provide an advantage to state-owned businesses by limiting the skilled workers and slaves available to Jewish businesses.

Jew-related edicts issued by Constantius (by himself or with others) included:

- Weaving women who moved from working for the government to working for Jews must be restored to the government
- Jews may not marry Christian women
- Jews may not attempt to convert Christian women
- Any non-Jewish slave bought by a Jew will be confiscated by the state
- If a Jew attempts to circumcise a non-Jewish slave, the slave will be freed and the Jew shall face capital punishment
- Any Christian slaves owned by a Jew will be taken away and freed
- A person who is proven to have converted from Christianity to Judaism shall have their property confiscated by the state
