= Ramsay MacMullen =

American historian (1928–2022)

Ramsay MacMullen (March 3, 1928 – November 28, 2022) was an American historian who was Emeritus Professor of History at Yale University, where he taught from 1967 to his retirement in 1993 as Dunham Professor of History and Classics. His scholarly interests were in the social history of Rome and the replacement of paganism by Christianity.

MacMullen was born in New York City on March 3, 1928. He graduated from Phillips Exeter Academy and summa cum laude from Harvard College.

When MacMullen was honored for a lifetime of scholarly achievement at the 2001 annual meeting of the American Historical Association with the Award for Scholarly Distinction, the award citation called him "the greatest historian of the Roman Empire alive today."

MacMullen died on November 28, 2022, at the age of 94.

== Major works ==
- Roman Social Relations, 50 B.C. to A.D. 284 (1974)
- Paganism in the Roman Empire (1984)
- Christianizing the Roman Empire: AD 100-400 (1984) ISBN 0-300-03216-1
- Soldier and Civilian in the Later Roman Empire (1963) Non-military life of the legions.
- Enemies of the Roman Order: Treason, Unrest and Alienation in the Empire (1966) ISBN 0-674-25400-7
- Corruption and the Decline of Rome. (1988) ISBN 0-300-04799-1
- Christianity and Paganism in the Fourth to Eighth Centuries (1997) ISBN 0-300-08077-8
- Romanization in the Time of Augustus (2000) ISBN 0-300-08254-1
- Voting About God in Early Church Councils (2006) Analyzing ecumenical councils from 325 to 553. ISBN 0-300-11596-2.
- The Second Church: Popular Christianity A.D. 200-400 (2009)
- Constantine (1970)
- Feelings in History, Ancient and Modern (2003) ISBN 1-930053-25-8
- Ancient History: Recent Work and New Directions with Kurt A. Raaflaub, Allen M. Ward, Stanley Mayer Burstein, Carol G. Thomas
- Changes in the Roman Empire: Essays in the Ordinary (1990)
- Roman Government's Response to Crisis, A.D. 235-337 (1976)
- The Earliest Romans: A Character Sketch (2011) ISBN 9780472117987
- Why Do We Do What We Do? : Motivation in History and the Social Sciences (2014)
