= Harold A. Drake =

American scholar of Ancient Roman history

Harold Allen Drake (born 1942) is an American scholar of Ancient Roman history, with an emphasis on late antiquity.

== Biography ==
Born in 1942, Drake grew up in Southern California and attended North Hollywood High School. He discussed the possibility of a career as a comedian with Jerry Lewis, but then decided to study journalism and history at the University of Southern California as an undergraduate where he was editor-in-chief of the Daily Trojan from 1962 to 1963. At USC he was elected to Phi Beta Kappa. Although he impressed Professor Thomas Africa with his performance in Roman history classes, Drake initially decided to seek a career in journalism after graduation and worked as a reporter for United Press International. He then pursued graduate study in history at the University of Wisconsin-Madison where he wrote a master's thesis on “The Great Vaccination Campaign: How Public Opinion was used in Early Modern Britain” in 1966. He then shifted his interest in policy history to ancient history and wrote his doctoral dissertation entitled “Semper victor eris: Evidence for the Policy and Belief of Constantine I contained in Eusebius' Tricennial oration” (directed by Professor Charles Farwell Edson, Jr.). While conducting research at the American Academy in Rome, Drake accepted an instructor position at the University of California, Santa Barbara in 1970, where he joined Frank J. Frost as the ancient history faculty (working his way from temporary lecturer to full professor).

Through the course of his long career at the University of California, Santa Barbara, Drake was noted for his teaching and mentoring skills. He was awarded the UCSB Associated Students’ Outstanding Teacher Award in both 1973 and 1974. Drake was awarded the Harold J. Plous Award for outstanding Assistant Professor in the 1976–1977 Academic Year by the Faculty Executive Committee of the College of Letters and Science at the University of California, Santa Barbara. In 1996, Drake was given a teaching award by the Alumni Association of the University of California, Santa Barbara. In 2006, he was awarded the outstanding Graduate Mentorship Award by the Academic Senate of the University of California, Santa Barbara. Drake also served as History Department Chair at the University of California, Santa Barbara from 1987 to 1990.

Drake continues an active scholarly agenda in the study of the later Roman Empire, especially focusing on Constantine and Church-State Relations in the fourth century CE. He was awarded a Membership of the faculty for Historical Studies at the Institute of Advanced Study at Princeton University for 1976–1977. He was awarded a fellowship from the Annenberg Research Institute in 1991 to support his research on Intolerance in the Roman Empire.

== Works ==
Drake's first book, In Praise of Constantine: A Historical Study and New Translation of Eusebius' Tricennial Orations (University of California Press), was a revision of his doctoral dissertation and examined speeches of Eusebius of Caesarea as a source for Constantine's policies. After working on a collaborative volume on a Coptic source (Eudoxia and the Holy Sepulchre: A Constantinian Legend in Coptic (Milan: Cisalpino, 1980), he produced a series of important articles such as “Eusebius on the True Cross,” Journal of Ecclesiastical History 36 (1985): 1-22; “Suggestions of dates in Constantine's Oration to the Saints,” American Journal of Philology 106 (1985): 335–349; “Athanasius' first exile,” Greek, Roman, and Byzantine Studies 27 (1986): 193–204; “What Eusebius knew: The genesis of the Vita Constantini,” Classical Philology 83 (1988): 20–38; “Policy and belief in Constantine's Oration to the Saints,” Studia Patristica 19 (1989): 43–51; “Constantine and Consensus,” Church History 64 (1995) 1-15; and “Lambs into Lions: explaining early Christian intolerance” Past &Present 153 (1996) 3-36. He followed these studies with his magisterial work Constantine and the Bishops: The Politics of Intolerance (Baltimore: Johns Hopkins University Press, 2000). He has also co-edited Violence in Late Antiquity with Routledge in 2006 and The City in the Classical and Post-Classical World: Changing Contexts of Power and Identity in 2014 with Cambridge University Press. Most recently, he published A Century of Miracles: Christians, Pagans, Jews, and the Supernatural, 312-410 in 2017 with Oxford University Press. In 2008, he retired and was awarded the status of Research Professor emeritus by the University of California, Santa Barbara. In that year, the Harold and Kathleen Drake Fund was also established at the UCSB History Department. The Lambda chapter of Phi Beta Kappa at the University of California, Santa Barbara created the Hal Drake Honor Key award to go "to the initiate majoring in history or the history of public policy who best demonstrates the highest ideals of Phi Beta Kappa."

Some of his former students co-edited a Festschrift to him in 2010 entitled The Rhetoric of Power in Late Antiquity: Religion and Politics in Byzantium, Europe and the Early Islamic World (with I.B. Tauris). The Festschrift was reprinted in a paperback version with minor corrections and revisions in 2020 (with Bloomsbury Publishing).

== Selected publications ==
- H. A. Drake, In Praise of Constantine: A Historical Study and New Translation of Eusebius' Tricennial Orations (Berkeley and Los Angeles: The University of California Press, 1976).
- H. A. Drake, Eudoxia and the Holy Sepulchre: A Constantinian Legend in Coptic (Milan: Cisalpino, 1980).
- H. A. Drake, Constantine and the Bishops: The Politics of Intolerance (Baltimore and London: Johns Hopkins University Press, 2000).
- H. A. Drake (co-edited), Laws, Gods, and Heroes: Thematic Readings in Early Western History (Kendall Hunt, 2002).
- H. A. Drake, (co-edited) eds. Violence in Late Antiquity (Routledge, 2006).
- H. A. Drake, eds., The City in the Classical and Post-Classical World: Changing Contexts of Power and Identity (Cambridge: Cambridge University Press, 2014).
- H. A. Drake, A Century of Miracles: Christians, Pagans, Jews, and the Supernatural, 312-410 (Oxford: Oxford University Press, 2017).
