= History of Christian thought on persecution and tolerance =

Development of Christian thought in the West

The history of Christian thought has included concepts of both inclusivity and exclusivity from its beginnings. These have been understood and applied differently in different ages, and have led to practices of both persecution and toleration. Early Christian thought established Christian identity, defined heresy and orthodoxy, and separated itself from polytheism and Judaism. Nearly all scholars prior to the late twentieth century claimed Christian thought was intolerant, as evidenced by the persecution of pagans and violence in the centuries after Christianity became favored by Christian emperors in the Roman Empire. However, the majority of modern scholars say that the change to Christian leadership did not cause the persecution of pagans, and that violence in society did not increase.

After the fall of the Roman Empire, Christian thought focused more on preservation than origination. This era of thought is exemplified by Gregory the Great, Saint Benedict, Visigothic Spain, illustrated manuscripts, and progress in medical care through monks. Although the roots of supersessionism, the theory that Christians replaced Jews as God's chosen, and deicide can be traced to some second century Christian thought, Jews of the Middle Ages lived mostly peacefully alongside their Christian neighbors because of Augustine of Hippo's teaching that they should be left alone. In the Early Middle Ages, Christian thought on the military and involvement in war shifted to accommodate the crusades by inventing chivalry and new monastic orders dedicated to it. There was no single thread of Christian thought throughout most of the Middle Ages, as the Church was largely democratic and each order had its own doctrine.

The High Middle Ages were pivotal in both European culture and Christian thought. Feudal kings began to lay the foundation of what would become their modern nations by centralizing power. They gained power through multiple means including persecution. Christian thought played a supportive role, as did the literati, a group of ambitious intellectuals who had contempt for those they thought beneath them, by verbally legitimizing those attitudes and actions. This contributed to a turning point in Judeo-Christian relations in the 13th century. Heresy became a religious, political, and social issue which led to civil disorder and the Medieval Inquisitions. The Albigensian Crusade is seen by many as evidence of Christianity's propensity for intolerance and persecution, while other scholars say it was conducted by the secular powers for their own ends.

The Late Middle Ages are marked by a decline in papal power and church influence, with accommodation to secular power becoming an increasingly prominent aspect of Christian thought. The modern Inquisitions were formed in the Late Middle Ages at the special request of the Spanish and Portuguese sovereigns. Where the medieval inquisitions had limited power and influence, the powers of the modern "Holy Tribunal" were taken over, extended, and enlarged by the state into "one of the most formidable engines of destruction which ever existed." During the Northern Crusades, Christian thought on conversion shifted to a pragmatic acceptance of conversion obtained through political pressure or military coercion even though theologians of the period continued to write that conversion must be voluntary.

By the time of the early Reformation (1400–1600), the conviction developed among the early Protestants that pioneering the concepts of religious freedom and religious toleration was necessary. Scholars say tolerance has never been an attitude broadly espoused by an entire society, not even western societies, and that only a few outstanding individuals, historically, have truly fought for it. In the West, Christian reformation figures, and later Enlightenment intellectuals, advocated for tolerance in the century preceding, during, and after the Reformation and into the Enlightenment. Contemporary Christians generally agree that tolerance is preferable to conflict, and that heresy and dissent are not deserving of punishment.

== Early Christian thought from the first century to Constantine ==
=== Historical background ===
In its first three centuries, Christian thought was just beginning to define what it meant to be a Christian, distinct from paganism and Judaism, through its definitions of orthodoxy and heterodoxy. Early Christian writers worked to reconcile the Jewish founding story, the Christian gospel of the Apostles, and the Greek tradition of knowing the divine through reason, but the substance of Christian orthodoxy was increasingly found in the homogeneous canon of writings believed to be apostolic (written by the apostles), that had circulated widely as such, and the writings of the Church Fathers that were based on them.

Persecution and tolerance are both the result of alterity, the state of otherness, and the question of how to properly deal with those who are 'outside' the defined identity. Like the other Abrahamic religions, Christian thought has included, from its beginnings, two ideals which have affected Christian responses to alterity: inclusivity (also called universality) and exclusivity, or as David Nirenberg describes them, our "mutual capacities for coexistence and violence." There is an inherent tension in all the Abrahamic traditions between exclusivity and inclusivity, which is theologically and practically dealt with by each in different ways.

Justo L. González traces three veins of Christian thought that began in the second century. Out of Carthage, Tertullian the lawyer (155–200 CE) wrote of Christianity as a revelation of the law of God. From the pluralistic city of Alexandria, Origen wrote of the commonalities between philosophy and theology, reason and revelation, seeing Christianity as the intellectual pursuit of transcendent truth. In Asia Minor and Syria, Irenaeus saw Christianity as God working in human history through its pastoral work of bringing people into God's love. Each vein of thought has persisted throughout Christian history and has shaped attitudes toward and practices of tolerance and persecution.

=== Inclusivity, exclusivity and heresy ===
Early Christian communities were highly inclusive in terms of social stratification and other social categories, much more so than were the Roman voluntary associations. Heterogeneity characterized the groups formed by Paul the Apostle, and the role of women was much greater than in either of the forms of Judaism or paganism in existence at the time. Early Christians were told to love others, even enemies, and Christians of all classes and sorts called each other "brother" and "sister". These concepts and practices were foundational to early Christian thought, have remained central, and can be seen as early precursors to modern concepts of tolerance.

Though tolerance was not a fully developed concept, and was held with some ambivalence, Guy Stroumsa says Christian thought of this era promotes inclusivity, yet invents the concept of heresy at the same time. Tertullian, a second-century Christian intellectual and lawyer from Carthage, advocated for religious tolerance primarily in an effort to convince pagan readers that Christianity should be allowed into the religious "market-place" that historian John North proposes second century Rome had become. On the other hand, Stroumsa argues that Tertullian knew co-existence meant competition, so he attempted to undermine the legitimacy of the pagan religions by comparing them to Christianity at the same time he advocated for tolerance from them. Justin Martyr (100–165 CE) wrote his First Apology (155–157 CE) against heretics, and is generally attributed with inventing the concept of heresy in Christian thought. Historian Geoffrey S. Smith argues that Justin writes only to answer objections his friends are facing and to defend these friends from ill treatment and even death. He quotes Justin in a letter to Emperor Antoninus Pius as saying he is writing: "On behalf of those from every race of men who are unjustly hated and ill-treated, being one of them myself." However, Alain Le Boulluec argues it is within this period that use of the term "heretic" in Christian thought and writings changes from neutral to derogatory.

==== Supersessionism ====
Supersessionist thought is defined by "two core beliefs: (1) that the nation of Israel has forfeited its status as the people of God through disobedience; and (2) the New Testament church has therefore become the true Israel and inheritor of the promises made to the nation of Israel." It has three forms: punitive, economic, and/or structural supersessionism. Punitive supersessionism is the 'hard' form of supersessionism, and is seen as punishment from God of Jews. Economic supersessionism is a more moderate form concerning God's economy: His plan in history to transfer the role of the "people of God" from an ethnic group to a universal group. The third form involves the New Testament taking priority over the Old Testament (Hebrew Bible) and ignoring or replacing the original meaning of Old Testament (Hebrew Bible) passages. For example, within the early church, the rise of the use of Greek philosophical interpretation and allegory allowed inferences to be drawn such as the one Tertullian drew when he allegorically interpreted the statement "the older will serve the younger", concerning the twin sons of Isaac and Rebekah (Genesis 25:23), to mean that Israel would "serve" the Church.

There is no agreement on when supersessionism began. Michael J. Vlach notes that some claim it began in the New Testament; some say it began with the Church Fathers; and others place its beginnings after the Bar Kokhba revolt in 135 CE. The 70 CE siege of Jerusalem and the destruction of the Second Temple, and the later Bar Kokhba revolt, both had a profound impact on Jewish–Christian relations. Many saw the still-extant Jewish Christians as traitors for not supporting their non-Christian Jewish kinfolk, and Vlach says supersessionism grew out of those events. Scholars such as Walter Kaiser Jr. see the fourth century, after the ascension of Constantine the Great, as supersessionism's true beginning, because that is when a shift in Christian thought on eschatology took place. The early Church reinterpreted Revelation 20:4–6—and its hope for a millennial reign of Jesus with a "redeemed" Israel after his Second Coming—and replaced it with a "historicized and allegorized version" that positioned the Church as the metaphorical Israel instead.

Tracing the roots of supersessionism to the New Testament is problematic since "there is no consensus" that supersessionism is a biblical doctrine at all. Vlatch says one's position on this is determined more by one's beginning assumptions than it is by any biblical hermeneutic. Arguments in favor of supersessionism have traditionally been based on implications and inferences rather than biblical texts themselves. Vlach asserts that the Church has also "always had compelling scriptural reasons, in both Testaments, to believe in a future salvation and restoration of the nation Israel." Therefore, supersessionism has never been an official doctrine and has never been universally held. Supersessionism's alternative is chiliasm, also known as millennialism: the belief that Jesus will return to Earth in visible form and establish a 1000-year kingdom. This was the traditional and more universally held view of the first two centuries, and has remained an aspect of Christian thought throughout its history. Scholar Steven D. Aguzzi suggests that supersessionism was still seen as a "normative view" in the writings of early Church Fathers like Justin, Barnabas, and Origen, and has been part of Christian thought for much of the Church's history. However, the early Patristic focus on millenarianism, influenced by Second Temple Judaism, helped counteract the more violent forms of supersessionism.

===== Evaluation =====
Supersessionism is significant in Christian thought because "It is undeniable that anti-Jewish bias has often gone hand-in-hand with the supersessionist view." Many Jewish writers trace antisemitism, and the consequences of it in World War II, to this particular doctrine among Christians. Twentieth-century Jewish civil rights leader Leonard P. Zakim asserted that, despite the many possible destructive consequences of supersessionism, as theology professor Padraic O'Hare writes: supersessionism alone is not yet antisemitism. John Gager makes a distinction between nineteenth-century antisemitism and second-century anti-Judaism, and many scholars agree, yet there are those who see early anti-Judaism and later antisemitism as the same. Anders Gerdmar sees the development of antisemitism as part of the paradigm shift that occurred in early modernity. Gerdmar argues the shift resulted from the new scientific focus on the Bible and history that replaced the primacy of theology and tradition. Christopher Leighton associates anti-Judaism with the origins of Christianity, and antisemitism with "modern nationalism and racial theories".

==== Deicide ====
Deicide as the prime accusation against the Jews appears, for the first time, in a highly rhetorical second-century poem by Melito of Sardis, of which only a few fragments have survived. In the fourth century, Augustine of Hippo refuted the accusation, saying the Jews could not be guilty of deicide as they did not believe Jesus was God. Melito's writings were not influential, and the idea was not immediately influential, but the accusation returned in fourth-century thinking, sixth-century actions, and in the Middle Ages.

=== Constantine ===
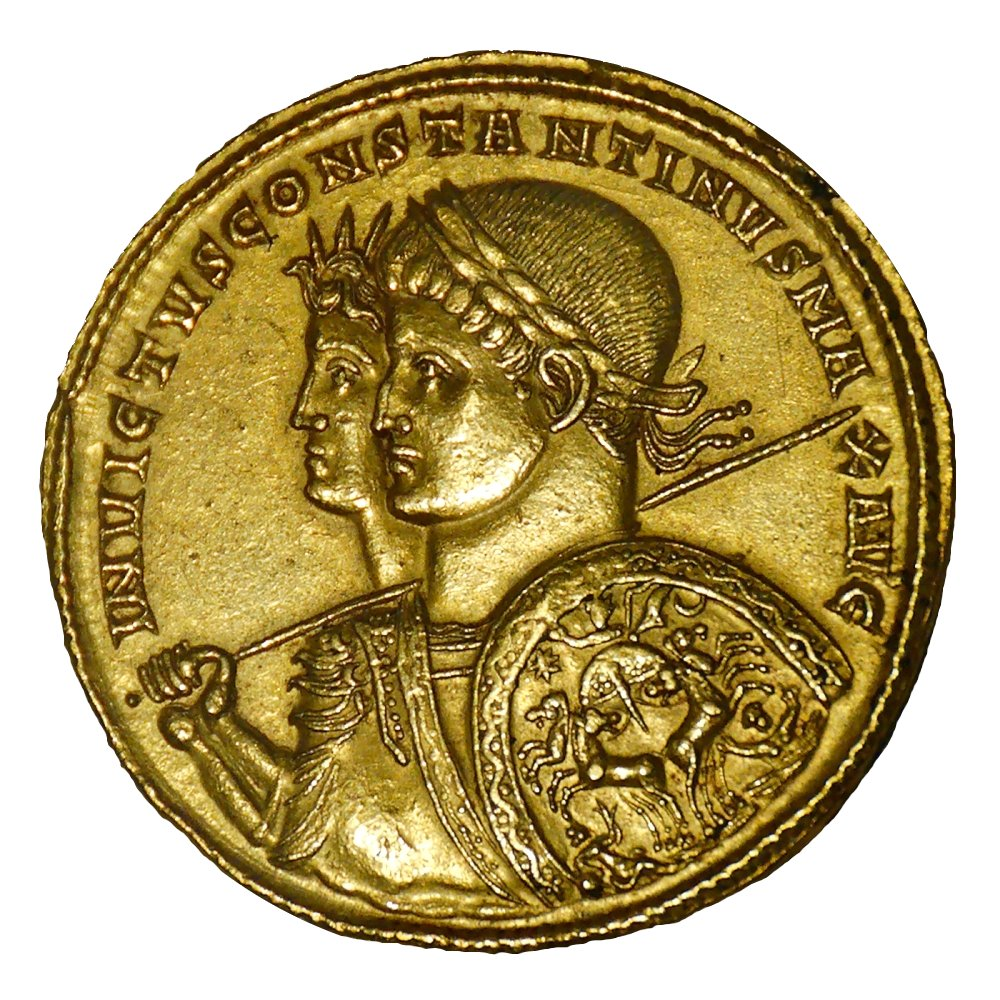
Gold coin depicting "Unconquered Constantine" with Sol Invictus, 313 CE

Christian thought was still in its infancy in 313 when, following the Battle of the Milvian Bridge, Constantine I (together with his co-emperor Licinius), issued the Edict of Milan granting religious toleration to the Christian faith. The Edict not only protected Christians from religious persecution but also all religions, allowing anyone to worship whichever deity they chose. After 320, Constantine supported the Christian church through his patronage, had a number of basilicas built for it, and endowed it with land and other wealth. He outlawed the gladiatorial shows, destroyed temples and plundered more, and used forceful rhetoric against non-Christians. Still, he never enacted a formal purge of non-Christians: "He did not punish pagans for being pagans, or Jews for being Jews, and did not adopt a policy of forced conversion," argues Christian theologian Peter Leithart.

While not making a direct personal contribution to Christian thought, the first Christian Roman emperor had a powerful impact on it through the example of his own conversion, his policies, and the various councils he called. Christian thought at the time of Constantine believed that victory over the "false gods" had begun with Jesus and ended with the conversion of Constantine as the final fulfillment of heavenly victory—even though Christians were only about 15–18% of the empire's population.

After Constantine, the empire gradually shifted toward Christianity as the Roman state religion. Many historians view the Constantinian shift as turning Christianity from a persecuted religion into a persecuting one. However, the claim that a Constantinian shift occurred has been challenged. Leithart argues that there was a "brief, ambiguous 'Constantinian moment' in the early fourth century," but that there was "no permanent, epochal 'Constantinian shift'". According to Michele R. Salzman, fourth century Rome featured sociological, political, economic and religious competition, producing tensions and hostilities between various groups, but that Christians focused on heresy more than pagans.

== Antiquity: from Constantine to the fall of empire ==
=== Historical background ===
Historians and theologians refer to the fourth century as the "golden age" of Christian thought. Figures such as John Chrysostom, Ambrose, Jerome, Basil, Gregory of Nazianus, Gregory of Nyssa, and the prolific Augustine, all made a permanent mark on Christian thought and history. They were primarily defenders of orthodoxy. They wrote philosophy and theology as well as apologetics and polemics. Some had a long-term effect on tolerance and persecution in Christian thought.

=== Fourth century Christian thought ===
Fourth century Christian thought was dominated by its many conflicts defining orthodoxy versus heterodoxy and heresy. In what remained of the Eastern Roman empire, known as Byzantium, the Arian controversy began with its debate of Trinitarian formulas which lasted 56 years. It gradually trickled over into the Latin West so that by the fourth century, the center of the controversy was the "champion of orthodoxy", Athanasius. Arianism was the reason for calling the Council of Nicea. Athanasius was ousted from his bishopric in Alexandria in 336 by the Arians, forced into exile, and lived much of the remainder of his life in a cycle of forced movement. The controversy became political after Constantine's death. Athanasius died in 373, while an Arian emperor ruled, but his orthodox teaching was a major influence in the West, and on Theodosius, who became emperor in 381. Also in the East, John Chrysostom, Bishop of Constantinople, who is best known for his brilliant oratory and his exegetical works on moral goodness and social responsibility, also wrote Discourses Against the Jews which is almost pure polemic, using replacement theology that is now known as supersessionism. However, Chrysostom did not advocate for killing heretics, even though he did advocate censoring them; he writes, "He [Christ] doth not therefore forbid our checking heretics, and stopping their mouths, and taking away their freedom of speech, and breaking up their assemblies and confederacies, but our killing and slaying them".

By 305, after the Diocletian persecution of the third century, many of those who had recanted during the persecution, wanted to return to the Church. The North African Donatists refused to accept them back as clergy and remained resentful toward the Roman government. Catholics wanted to wipe the slate clean and accommodate the new government. The Donatists withdrew and began setting up their own churches. For decades, Donatists fomented protests and street violence, refused compromise, attacked random Catholics without warning, doing serious and unprovoked bodily harm such as beating people with clubs, cutting off their hands and feet, and gouging out eyes. By the time Augustine became coadjutor Bishop of Hippo in 395, the Donatists had been a multi-level problem for many years. Augustine held that belief cannot be compelled, so he appealed to them verbally, using popular propaganda, debate, personal appeal, General Councils, and political pressure. All attempts failed.

The empire responded to civil unrest with force, and in 408 in his Letter 93, Augustine began defending persecution of the Donatists by the imperial authorities saying that, "if the kings of this world could legislate against pagans and poisoners, they could do so against heretics as well." He continued saying that belief cannot be compelled, however, he also included the idea that, while "coercion cannot transmit the truth to the heretic, it can prepare them to hear and receive the truth." Augustine did not advocate religious violence, as such, but he supported the power of the state to use coercion against those he saw as behaving as enemies. His authority on this question was undisputed for over a millennium in Western Christianity, and according to historian Peter Brown, "it provided the theological foundation for the justification of medieval persecution."

Augustine had advocated fines, imprisonment, banishment, and moderate floggings; when the state's persecution of individual Donatists became extreme, he attempted to mitigate the punishments, and he always opposed the execution of heretics. According to Henry Chadwick, Augustine "would have been horrified by the burning of heretics."

In 385, Priscillian, a bishop in Spain, was the first Christian to be executed for heresy, though this sentence was roundly condemned by prominent church leaders like Ambrose. Priscillian was also accused of gross sexual immorality and acceptance of magic, but politics may have been involved in his sentencing.

==== Anti-paganism in late antique Roman empire ====
Polytheism began declining by the second century, long before there were Christian emperors, but after Constantine made Christianity officially accepted, it declined even more rapidly, and there are two views on why. According to the Oxford Handbook of Late Antiquity, scholars of Antiquity fall into two categories, holding either the "catastrophic" view, or the "long and slow" view of polytheism's decline and end. The traditional "catastrophic" view has been the established view for 200 years; it says polytheism declined rapidly in the fourth century, with a violent death in the fifth, as a result of determined anti-pagan opposition from Christians, particularly Christian emperors. Contemporary scholarship espouses the "long slow" view, which says anti-paganism was not a primary concern of Christians in antiquity because Christians believed the conversion of Constantine showed Christianity had already triumphed. Michele R. Salzman indicates that, as a result of this "triumphalism", heresy was a higher priority for Christians in the fourth and fifth centuries than was paganism. This produced less real conflict between Christians and pagans than was previously thought. Archaeologists Luke Lavan and Michael Mulryan indicate that contemporary archaeological evidence of religious conflict exists, as the catastrophists assert, but not to the degree or intensity previously thought.

Laws such as the Theodosian decrees attest to Christian thought of the period, giving a "dramatic view of radical Christian ambition". Peter Brown says the language is uniformly vehement and the penalties are harsh and frequently horrifying. Salzman says the law was intended as a means of conversion through the "carrot and the stick", but that it is necessary to look beyond the law to see what people actually did. Authorities, who were still mostly pagan, were lax in imposing them, and Christian bishops frequently obstructed their application. Anti-paganism existed, but according to Rita Lizzi Testa, Michele Salzman, and Marianne Sághy who quote Alan Cameron: the idea of religious conflict as the cause of a swift demise of paganism is pure historiographical construction. Lavan says Christian writers gave the narrative of victory high visibility, but that it does not necessarily correlate to actual conversion rates. There are many signs that a healthy paganism continued into the fifth century, and in some places, into the sixth and beyond.

According to Brown, Christians objected to anything that called the triumphal narrative into question, and that included the mistreatment of non-Christians. Temple destructions and conversions are attested, but in small numbers. Archaeology indicates that in most regions away from the imperial court, the end of paganism was both gradual and untraumatic. The Oxford Handbook of Late Antiquity says that "Torture and murder were not the inevitable result of the rise of Christianity." Instead, there was fluidity in the boundaries between the communities and "coexistence with a competitive spirit." Brown says that "In most areas, polytheists were not molested, and, apart from a few ugly incidents of local violence, Jewish communities also enjoyed a century of stable, even privileged, existence." Having, in 423, been declared by the emperor Theodosius II not to exist, large bodies of polytheists all over the Roman empire were not murdered or converted under duress so much as they were simply left out of the histories the Christians wrote of themselves as victorious.

== Early Medieval West (c. 500 – c. 800) ==
=== Historical background ===
After the Fall of the Western Roman Empire, life in the West returned to an agrarian subsistence style of living, becoming somewhat settled sometime in the 500s. Christian writers of the period were more concerned with preserving the past than in composing original works. The Germanic tribes which had overthrown Rome became the new rulers, dividing the empire between them. Gregory the Great became pope in 590AD, and he sent out multiple missionaries who peacefully converted Britain, Ireland, Scotland and more. Learning was kept alive in the monasteries they built which became the sole source of education for the next few centuries. Patrick Wormald indicates the Irish and English missionaries sent out to those territories that would become the Holy Roman Empire and then Germany, thought of the pagans on the continental mainland with "interest, sympathy and occasionally even admiration."

In most of history, victors of war imposed their religion on the newly subjugated people, however, the Germanic tribes gradually adopted Christianity, the religion of defeated Rome, instead. This brought, in its wake, a broad process of cultural change that lasted for the next 500 years. What had been formed by the unity of the classical world and Christianity, was now transplanted into Germanic tribal culture, thereby forming a new synthesis that became western European Christendom. The Church had immense influence during this time due to the endless commitment and work of the clergy and the "powerful effect of the Christian belief system" amongst the people.

Erigina was not a major theologian, but in 870, he wrote On the Division of Nature which foresaw the modern view of predestination denying that God has foreordained anyone to sin and damnation. His mixture of rationalism and Neo-Platonic mysticism would prove influential to later Christian thought, though his books were banned by the Roman Catholic church in 1681.

=== Partial inclusivity of the Jews ===
According to Anna Sapir Abulafia, "Most scholars would agree that, with the marked exception of Visigothic Spain (in the seventh century), Jews in Latin Christendom lived relatively peacefully with their Christian neighbors through most of the Middle Ages." Scattered violence toward Jews occasionally took place during riots led by mobs, local leaders, and lower level clergy without the support of church leaders or Christian thought. Jeremy Cohen says historians generally agree this is because Catholic thought on the Jews before the 1200s was guided by the teachings of Augustine. Augustine's position on the Jews, with its accompanying argument for their "immunity from religious coercion enjoyed by virtually no other community in post-Theodosian antiquity" was preceded by a positive evaluation of the Jewish past, and its relationship to divine justice and human free will. Augustine rejected those who argued that the Jews should be killed, or forcibly converted, by saying that Jews should be allowed to live in Christian societies and practice Judaism without interference because they preserved the teachings of the Old Testament and were living witnesses of the truths of the New Testament.

Gregory the Great is generally seen as an important pope in relation to the Jews. He denigrated Judaism but followed Roman Law and Augustinian thought with regard to how the Jews should be treated. He wrote against forced baptism. In 828, Gregory IV wrote a letter to the Bishops in Gaul and the Holy Roman empire warning that Jews must not be baptized by force. Gregory X repeated the ban. Even Pope Innocent III, who generally found the behavior of Jews in Christian society to be "intolerable", still agreed that the Jews should not be killed or forcibly converted when he called for the Second Crusade.

Jews and their communities were always vulnerable. Random ill treatment, and occasionally real persecution, did occur. However, their legal status, while it was inferior, was not insecure as it became later in the High Middle Ages. They could appeal to the authorities, and did, even on occasion appealing to the pope himself. While the difficulties were not negligible, they were also not general enough to fundamentally impact the nature of Jewish life.

=== Inclusive Benedict ===
St. Benedict (480–547) was another major figure who impacted pre-modern ideals of tolerance in Christian thought. Considered the father of western monasticism, he wrote his Rule around three values: community, prayer, and hospitality. This hospitality was extended to anyone without discrimination. "Pilgrims and visitors from every rank of society from crowned heads to poorest peasants, came in search of prayers or alms, protection and hospitality."

=== Exclusive Spain ===
Visigothic leaders in Spain subjected the Jews to persecution and efforts to convert them forcibly for a century after 613. Norman Roth says Byzantine legal codes were the method used to reinforce anti-Jewish attitudes. The Breviarium of Alaric summarizes the most significant anti-Jewish legislation of the Byzantine codes, and it was written in the sixth century.

== Early Middle Ages (c. 800 – c. 1000) ==
=== Historical background ===
Christian thought from its early days had generally frowned upon participation in the military, but that became increasingly difficult to maintain in the Middle Ages. Chivalry, a new ideal of the religious warrior who fought for justice, defended truth, and protected the weak and the innocent formed. Such a knight was ordained only after proving his spiritual and martial worth: robed in white, he would swear an oath before a cleric to uphold these values and defend the faith.

==== Massacre of Verden ====
Europe 814

While contemporary definitions of religious persecution typically do not include actions taken during war, the Massacre of Verden represents an event that is still often seen as persecution by Christians. The massacre took place in 782, in what had been Roman Gaul, and would one day be modern France.

Charlemagne had become King of the Franks in 771, and ruled most of western Europe of the time. He advocated Christian principles, including education, openly supported Christian missions, and had at least one Christian advisor. But he also spent his entire life fighting to defend his empire and his faith. The Franks had been fighting the Saxons since the time of Charlemagne's grandfather. Charlemagne himself began to fight the Saxons in earnest in 772, defeating them and taking hostages in a battle on the upper Weser. "Time and again the Saxon chiefs, worn down by war, sued for peace, offered hostages, accepted baptism and agreed to allow missionaries to go about their work without hindrance. But vigilance slackened, Charles was engaged on some other front, rebellions broke out, Frankish garrisons were attacked and massacred, and monasteries were pillaged". Repeatedly, Saxons rose, pillaged and looted and killed, were defeated, and rose again, until after 779, Charlemagne felt he had pacified the region and gained genuine oaths of loyalty from the Saxon leaders. In 782, Charles and the Saxons assembled at Lippe, where he appointed "several Saxon nobles as Counts as a reward for their loyalty".

Shortly thereafter, in that same year of 782, Widukind the Saxon leader, persuaded a group of Saxons who had submitted to Charlemagne, to break their oaths and rebel. Charlemagne was once again elsewhere, so the Saxons went to battle with the part of the Frankish army that had been left behind and the "Franks were killed almost to a man". They killed two of the King's chief lieutenants as well as some of his closest companions and counsellors. "In great anger at this breach of the treaty just made", Charlemagne gathered his forces, returned to Saxony, conquered the Saxon rebels, again, giving them the option to convert or die. The Saxons largely refused, and though no one knows the number for sure, it is said 4,500 unarmed prisoners were murdered in what is called the Massacre of Verden. Massive deportations followed, and death was decreed as the penalty for any Saxon who refused baptism thereafter. After this, Charlemagne transported ten thousand families from the most turbulent district into the heart of his own territory, and the Saxons were finally settled.

Historian Matthias Becher asserts that the number 4,500 is exaggerated, and that these events demonstrate the brutality of war of the period. Yet it is clear something untoward occurred, since Alcuin of York, Charlemagne's Christian advisor who was not present in Verden, later wrote the king a rebuke concerning them, saying that: "Faith must be voluntary not coerced. Converts must be drawn to the faith not forced. A person can be compelled to be baptized yet not believe. An adult convert should answer what he truly believes and feels, and if he lies, then he will not have true salvation."

=== Crusades ===
From the beginning, the crusades have been seen from different points of view. Darius von Güttner-Sporzyński explains that scholars continue to debate crusading and its impact so scholarship in this field is continually undergoing revision and reconsideration. Many early crusade scholars saw crusade histories as simple recitations of how events actually transpired, but by the eighteenth and nineteenth centuries, scholarship was increasingly critical and skeptical of that perspective. Simon John writes that Christopher Tyerman is in the forefront of contemporary scholarship when he says that the "earliest of crusade histories can not be regarded by scholars even in part as 'mere recitation of events.' Instead, they should be treated in their entirety as 'essays in interpretation'."

At the time of the First Crusade, there was no clear concept in Christian thought of what a crusade was beyond that of a pilgrimage. Hugh S. Pyper says the crusades are representative of the "powerful sense in Christian thought of the time of the importance of the concreteness of Jesus' human existence... The city [of Jerusalem's] importance is reflected in the fact that early medieval maps place [Jerusalem] at the center of the world."

By 1935, Carl Erdmann published Die Entstehung des Kreuzzugsgedankens (The Origin of the Idea of Crusade), stressing that the crusades were essentially defensive acts on behalf of fellow Christians and pilgrims in the East who were being attacked, killed, enslaved or forcibly converted. Crusade historian Jonathan Riley-Smith says the crusades were products of the renewed spirituality of the central Middle Ages. Senior churchmen of this time presented the concept of Christian love for those in need as the reason to take up arms. The people had a concern for living the vita apostolica and expressing Christian ideals in active works of charity, exemplified by the new hospitals, the pastoral work of the Augustinians and Premonstratensians, and the service of the friars. Riley-Smith concludes, "The charity of St. Francis may now appeal to us more than that of the crusaders, but both sprang from the same roots." Constable adds that those "scholars who see the crusades as the beginning of European colonialism and expansionism would have surprised people at the time. [Crusaders] would not have denied some selfish aspects... but the predominant emphasis was on the defense and recovery of lands that had once been Christian and on the self-sacrifice rather than the self-seeking of the participants."

At the opposite end is the view voiced by Steven Runciman in 1951 that the "Holy War was nothing more than a long act of intolerance in the name of God..." Giles Constable says this view is common among the populace. According to political science professor Andrew R. Murphy, concepts of tolerance and intolerance were not starting points for thoughts about relations for any of the various groups involved in or affected by the crusades. Instead, concepts of tolerance began to grow during the crusades from efforts to define legal limits and the nature of co-existence. Angeliki Laiou says that "many scholars today reject [Runciman's type of] hostile judgment and emphasize the defensive nature of the crusades" instead.

The crusades made a powerful contribution to Christian thought through the concept of Christian chivalry, "imbuing their Christian participants with what they believed to be a noble cause, for which they fought in a spirit of self-sacrifice. However, in another sense, they marked a qualitative degeneration in behavior for those involved, for they engendered and strengthened hostile attitudes..." Ideas such as Holy War and Christian chivalry, in both Christian thought and culture, continued to evolve gradually from the eleventh to the thirteenth centuries. This can be traced in expressions of law, traditions, tales, prophecy, and historical narratives, in letters, bulls and poems written during the crusading period. "The greatest of all crusader historians, William, archbishop of Tyre wrote his Chronicon from the point of view of a Latin Christian born and living in the East". Like others of his day, he did not start with a notion of tolerance, but he did advocate for, and contribute to, concepts that led to its development.

== High Middle Ages (c. 1000–1200) ==
=== Historical background ===
In the pivotal twelfth century, Europe began laying the foundation for its gradual transformation from the medieval to the modern. Feudal lords slowly lost power to the feudal kings as kings began centralizing power into themselves and their nation. Kings built their own armies, instead of relying on their vassals, thereby taking power from the nobility. They started taking over legal processes that had traditionally belonged to local nobles and local church officials; and they began using these new legal powers to target minorities. According to R.I. Moore and other contemporary scholars such as John D. Cotts, and Peter D. Diehl "the growth of secular power and the pursuit of secular interests, constituted the essential context of the developments that led to a persecuting society." Some of these developments, such as centralization and secularization, also took place within the Church whose leaders bent Christian thought to aid the state in the production of new rhetoric, patterns, and procedures of exclusion and persecution. According to Moore, the Church "played a significant role in the formation of the persecuting society but not the leading one." (Note: Mandell Creighton wrote in 1906 that: "It might be argued, with some plausibility, that the church never originated any method of persecution, but accepted it at the suggestion of the State... but if it were true, it would not lessen the responsibility of the church for adopting a method that was alien to her purpose... Men never thought persecution right, but they valued social order...and power..and the machinery of the church adapted to the world's purposes, and the world used its additional source of power.")

By the 13th century, both civil and canon law had become a major aspect of ecclesiastical culture, dominating Christian thought. Most bishops and popes were trained lawyers rather than theologians, and much of the Christian thought of this period became little more than an extension of law. According to the Oxford Companion to Christian Thought, by the High Middle Ages, the religion that had begun by decrying the power of law (Romans 7:6) had developed the most complex religious law the world has ever seen, a system in which equity and universality were largely overlooked.

==== Mendicant orders ====
New religious orders, that were founded during this time, each represent a different branch of Christian thought with its own distinct theology. Three of those new orders would have a separate but distinct impact on Christian thought on tolerance and persecution: the Dominicans, the Franciscans, and the Augustinians.

Dominican thought reached beyond a simple anti-heretical discourse into a broader and deeper ideology of sin, evil, justice, and punishment. They conceived themselves as fighting for truth against heterodoxy and heresy. St. Thomas Aquinas, perhaps the most illustrious of Dominicans, supported tolerance as a general principle. He taught that governing well included tolerating some evil in order to foster good or prevent worse evil. However, in his Summa Theologica II-II qu. 11, art. 3, he adds that heretics—after two fruitless admonitions—deserve only excommunication and death.

The Christian thought of St. Francis was pastoral. He is recognized for his commitment to issues of social justice and his embrace of the natural world but, during his lifetime, he was also a strong advocate of conversion of the Muslims, though he believed he would likely die for it. Francis was motivated by an intense devotion to the humanity of Christ, a regard for his sufferings, and by identifying the sufferings of ordinary people with the sufferings of Christ. Through the teachings of the Franciscans, this thinking emerged from the cloister, reoriented much Christian thought toward love and compassion, and became a central theme for the ordinary Christian.

Although the debate over defining the Augustinianism of the High Middle Ages has been ongoing for three quarters of a century, there is agreement that the Order of the Hermits of St. Augustine supported the development of church hierarchy and embraced concepts such as the primacy of the pope and his perfection. The question of church authority in the West had remained unsettled until the eleventh century when the Church hierarchy worked to centralize power into the pope. Although centralization of power was never fully achieved within the Church, the era of "papal monarchy" began, and the Church gradually began to resemble its secular counterparts in its conduct, thought, and objectives.

=== Inquisitions, authority and exclusion ===
The medieval inquisitions were a series of separate inquisitions beginning from around 1184. The label Inquisition is problematic because it implies "an institutional coherence and an official unity that never existed in the Middle Ages." The inquisitions were formed in response to the breakdown of social order associated with heresy. Heresy was a religious, political, and social issue, so "the first stirrings of violence against dissidents were usually the result of popular resentment." There are many examples of this popular resentment involving mobs murdering heretics. Leaders reasoned that both lay and church authority had an obligation to step in when sedition, peace, or the general stability of society was part of the issue. In the Late Roman Empire, an inquisitorial system of justice had developed, and that system was revived in the Middle Ages using a combined panel (a tribunal) of both civil and ecclesiastical representatives with a bishop, his representative, or sometimes a local judge, as inquisitor. Essentially, the Church reintroduced Roman law in Europe in the form of the Inquisition when it seemed that Germanic law had failed.

The revival of Roman law made it possible for Pope Innocent III (1198–1216) to make heresy a political question when he took Roman law's doctrine of lèse-majesté, and combined it with his view of heresy as laid out in the 1199 decretal Vergentis in senium, thereby equating heresy with treason against God.

Much of the papal reform of the eleventh century was not moral or theological reform so much as it was an attempt to impose this kind of Roman authority over the vast variety of local legal traditions that had existed up through the early Middle Ages. However, no pope ever succeeded in establishing complete control of the inquisitions. The institution reached its apex in the second half of the thirteenth century. During this period, the tribunals were almost entirely free from any higher authority, including that of the pope, and it became almost impossible to prevent abuse.

==== New persecution of minorities ====
The process of centralizing power included the development of a new kind of persecution aimed at minorities. R. I. Moore says the European nation-states had not exhibited a "habit" of persecuting minorities before the twelfth and thirteenth centuries. Jews, lepers, heretics and gays were the first minorities to be persecuted, and they were followed in the next few centuries by Gypsies, beggars, spendthrifts, prostitutes, and discharged soldiers. They were all vulnerable to whatever degree they existed "outside" the community. Religious persecution had certainly been familiar in the Roman Empire, and remained so throughout the history of the Byzantine Empire, but it had largely faded away in the West before reappearing in the eleventh century. The various persecutions of minorities became established over the next hundred years. In this it was "determined, not only over whom, but also by whom, the [increasing] power of government was to be exercised."

For example, Peter Comestor (d. 1197) was the first influential scholar to interpret biblical injunctions against sodomy as injunctions against homosexual intercourse. The Third Lateran council of 1179 then became the first ecclesiastical council to rule that men who engaged in homosexual activity should be deprived of office or excommunicated. However, "the real impetus of the attack on homosexuality did not come from the Church." The Fourth Lateran council reduced those penalties, and though Gregory IX (1145–1241) ordered the Dominicans to root out homosexuality from the territory that later became the nation of Germany, a century earlier, the kingdom of Jerusalem had spread a legal code ordaining death for "sodomites". From the 1250s onwards, a series of similar legal codes in the nation-states of Spain, France, Italy and Germany followed this example. "By 1300, places where male sodomy was not a capital offense had become the exception rather than the rule."

Centralization of power led all of Europe of the High Middle Ages to become a persecuting culture. Christian thought, along with the intellectuals of the day who published their pejorative views of minorities in writing, helped make persecution a tool of the process of centralization as well as its inevitable result. Together, secular rulers and writers, along with Christian leadership and thought, created a new rhetoric of exclusion, legitimizing persecution based on new attitudes of stereotyping, stigmatization and even demonization of the accused. Moore says this contributed to "deliberate and socially sanctioned violence ... directed, through established governmental, judicial and social institutions, against groups of people defined by general characteristics such as race, religion or way of life. Membership in such groups in itself came to be regarded as justifying these attacks."

Instead of having to face one's accuser, new laws allowed the state to be the defendant and bring charges on its own behalf. The Assize of Arms of 1252 appointed constables to police breaches of the peace, and deliver offenders to the sheriff. In France, the constabulary was regularized in 1337 as a military body used to enforce the new laws. There were new funds to pay them as cities introduced several direct taxes: head taxes for the poor, and net-worth taxes or, occasionally, crude income taxes for the rich. New gold coins, trade and the new banks also made private policing possible. The inquisitions were a new legal method that allowed the judge to investigate on his own initiative without requiring a victim (other than the state) to press charges. Together, these enabled secular leaders to gain power by making others powerless.

During the fourteenth century, the kings in France and England were successful at centralizing power in their nations, and many other countries wanted to imitate them and their governing style. Other countries were not alone in that: the Church wanted to imitate the secular kings as well. The primary success of the fourteenth century popes was in amassing power into the papal position, making any pope similar to a secular king. This is often called the papal monarchy or the papal-monarchial idea. As part of that process, popes in this century reorganized the financial system of the Church. The poor had previously been allowed to offer their tithes 'in kind', in goods and services instead of cash, but these popes revamped the system to only accept money. The popes then had a steady cash flow, along with papal states: property the Church owned that was ruled only by the pope and not a king. This gave them almost as much power as any king. They governed as the secular powers governed: with "royal [papal] secretaries, efficient treasuries, national [papal] judiciaries, and representative assemblies". The pope became a pseudo-monarch, and the Church became secular, but the popes were so greedy, worldly, and politically corrupt, that pious Christians became disgusted, thereby undermining the papal authority that centralization was supposed to establish.

===== Persecution of the Jews =====
Historians agree that the period which spanned the eleventh, twelfth and thirteenth centuries was a turning point in Jewish-Christian relations. Bernard of Clairvaux (1090–1153), pillar of European monasticism and powerful twelfth century preacher, provides a perfect example of a Christian thinker who was balancing on a precipice, preaching hateful images of Jews but sounding Scripture based admonitions that they must be protected despite their nature." Low level discussions of religious thought had long existed between Jews and Christians. These interchanges attest to neighborly relations as Jews and Christians both struggled to fit the "other" into their sense of the demands of their respective faiths, and balance the human opponents who were facing them, with the traditions which they had inherited. By the thirteenth century, that changed in both tone and quality, growing more polemical.

In 1215, the Fourth Lateran Council, known as the Great Council, met and accepted 70 canons (laws). It hammered out a working definition of Christian community, stating the essentials of membership in it, thereby defining the "other" within Christian thought for the next three centuries. The last three canons required Jews to distinguish themselves from Christians in their dress, prohibited them from holding public office, and prohibited Jewish converts from continuing to practice Jewish rituals. As Berger has articulated it: "The other side of the coin of unique toleration was unique persecution." There was an increased and focused effort to convert and baptize Jews rather than tolerate them.

===== Trial of the Talmud =====
As their situation deteriorated, many Jews became enraged and polemics between the two faiths sunk to new depths. As Inquisitors learned how the central figures in Christianity were mocked, they went after the Talmud, and other Jewish writings. The Fourth Lateran council, in its 68th canon, placed on the secular authorities the responsibility for obtaining an answer from the Jews to the charge of blasphemy. For the first time in their history, Jews had to answer in a public trial the charges against them. There is no consensus in the sources as to who instigated the trial against the Talmud, but in June 1239, Gregory IX (1237–1241) issued letters to various archbishops and kings across Europe in which he ordered them to seize all Jewish books and take them to the Dominicans for examination. The order was only heeded in Paris where, on June 25, the royal court was opened to hear the case. Eventually, each side claimed victory; a final verdict of guilt and condemnation was not announced until May 1248, but the books had been burned six years before.

One result of the trial was that the people of Europe thought that, even if they had once had an obligation to preserve the Jews for the sake of the Old Testament, Talmudic Judaism was so different from its biblical sources that the old obligations no longer applied. In the words of Hebrew University historian Ben-Zion Dinur, from 1244 on the state and the Church would "consider the Jews to be a people with no religion (benei bli dat) who have no place in the Christian world."

===== Expulsions of Jews in Europe from 1100 to 1600 =====
Expulsions of Jews in Europe from 1100 to 1600

The situation of the Jews differed from that of other victims of persecution because of their relationship with civic authorities and money. They often filled the role of financial agent or manager for the lords; they and their possessions were considered the property of the king in England; and they were often exempted from taxes and other laws because of the importance of their usury. This attracted unpopularity, jealousy and resentment from non-Jews.

As feudal lords lost power, the Jews became a focus of their opponents. J. H. Mundy has put it: "The opponents of princes hated the Jews" and "almost every medieval movement against princely or seignorial power began by attacking Jews." Opposition to the barons in England led to the Jewish expulsion in 1290. The expulsion from France in 1315 coincided with the formation of the league against arbitrary royal government.

As princes consolidated power to themselves with the institution of general taxation, they were able to be less monetarily dependent on the Jews. They were then less inclined to protect them, and were instead more inclined to expel them and confiscate their property for themselves.

Townspeople also attacked Jews. "Otto of Friesing reports that Bernard of Clairvaux in 1146 silenced a wandering monk at Mainz who stirred up popular revolt by attacking the Jews, but as the people gained a measure of political power around 1300, they became one of Jewry's greatest enemies."

Local anti-Jewish movements were often headed by local clergy, especially its radicals. The Fourth Lateran council of 1215 required Jews to restore "grave and immoderate usuries". Thomas Aquinas spoke against allowing the Jews to continue practicing usury. In 1283, the Archbishop of Canterbury spearheaded a petition demanding restitution of usury and urging the Jewish expulsion in 1290.

Emicho of Leiningen, who was probably mentally unbalanced, massacred Jews in Germany in search of supplies, loot, and protection money for a poorly provisioned army. The York massacre of 1190 also appears to have had its origins in a conspiracy by local leaders to liquidate their debts along with their creditors. In the early fourteenth century, systematic popular and judicial attack left the European Jewish community impoverished by the next century.

Although subordinate to religious, economic and social themes, racist concepts also reinforced hostility.

===== Antisemitism =====
The term antisemitism was coined in the nineteenth century; however, many Jewish intellectuals have insisted that modern antisemitism, which is based on race, and the religiously based anti-Judaism of the past, are two different forms of a single historical phenomenon. Other scholars such as John Gager make a clear distinction between anti-Judaism and antisemitism. Craig Evans defines anti-Judaism as opposition to Judaism as a religion, while antisemitism is opposition to the Jewish people themselves. Langmuir insists that antisemitism did not become widespread in popular culture until the eleventh century when it took root among people who were being buffeted by rapid social and economic changes. Anders Gerdmar sees the development of antisemitism as part of the paradigm shift of early modernity that replaced the primacy of theology, and the tradition of Augustine, with the primacy of human reason.

Some have linked antisemitism to Christian thought on supersessionism. Perhaps the greatest Christian thinker of the Middle Ages was Thomas Aquinas, who continues to be highly influential in Catholicism. There is disagreement over where exactly Aquinas stood on the question of supersessionism. He did not teach punitive supersessionism, but did speak of Judaism as fulfilled and obsolete. Aquinas does appear to believe the Jews had been cast into spiritual exile for their rejection of Christ, but he also says Jewish observance of Law continues to have positive theological significance. For all the destructive consequences of supersessionism, Padraic O'Hare writes that supersessionism alone is not yet antisemitism. He cites Christopher Leighton who associates anti-Judaism with the origins of Christianity, and antisemitism with "modern nationalism and racial theories".

The Latin word deicidae was a translation of the Greek word that first appeared in Melito of the second century. Augustine had long ago rejected the concept, but the accusation began to flourish, within the altered situation of the High Middle Ages, when it was used to legitimize crimes against the Jews. The debate within Christian thought over the transubstantiation of the communion host helped foster the legend that Jews desecrated it. The ritual murder legend can also be tied to the accusation of Jewish deicide. By 1255, when Jews were charged with Hugh of Lincoln's ritual murder, it was not the first time they had been charged with such a crime. At other times, such allegations were rejected after full investigations had been conducted.

=== Heresy ===
There is a vast array of scholarly opinions on heresy, including whether it actually existed. Russell says that, as the Church became more centralized and hierarchical, it was able to more clearly define orthodoxy than it ever had been before, and concepts of heresy developed along with it as a result. Mitchell Merback speaks of three groups involved in the persecution of heresy: the civil authorities, the Church and the people. Historian R. I. Moore says the part the Church played in turning dissent into heresy has been overestimated. According to Moore, the increased significance of heresy in the High Middle Ages reflects the secular powers' recognition of the devastating nature of the heretic's political message: that heretics were independent of the structures of power. James A. Brundage writes that the formal prosecution of heresy was codified in civil law, and was generally left to the civil authorities before this period. Russell adds that heresy became common only after the Third Lateran Council in 1179.

The dissemination of popular heresy to the laity (non-clergy) was a new problem for the bishops of the eleventh and twelfth centuries; heresy had previously been an accusation made solely toward bishops and other church leaders. The collection of ecclesiastical law from Burchard of Worms around 1002 did not include the concept of popular heresy in it. While there were acts of violence in response to heresy undertaken by secular powers for their own reasons, Christian thought on this problem (at the beginning of the High Middle Ages) still tended to coincide with Wazo of Liège who said reports of heresy should be investigated, true heretics excommunicated, and their teachings publicly rebuked.

By the end of the eleventh century, Christian thought had evolved a definition of heresy as the "deliberate rejection of the truth". This shifted attitudes concerning the Church's appropriate response. The Council of Montpellier in 1062, and the Council of Toulouse in 1119, both demanded that heretics be handed over to secular powers for coercive punishment. As most bishops thought this would be participation in shedding blood, the Church refused until 1148 when the notorious and violent Eon de l'Etoile was so delivered. Eon was found mad, but a number of his followers were burned.

==== Albigensian Crusade ====
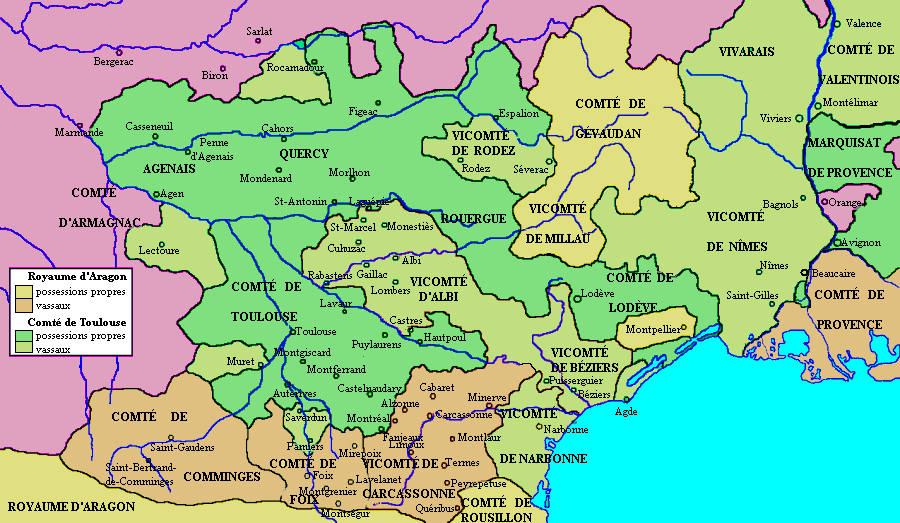
Map of Languedoc on the eve of the Albigensian Crusade

Cathars, also known as Albigensians, were the largest of the heretic groups of the late 1100s and early 1200s. Catharism may reach back to the age of Constantine in the East, but there is consensus among most modern scholars that Catharism as an identifiable historical movement did not emerge in Europe until around 1143, when the first confirmed report of a group at Cologne is reported by the cleric Eberwin of Steinfeld Abbey. From 1125 to 1229, Cistercian monks left their isolation and served as itinerant preachers traversing town and country in anti-heretical campaigns aimed increasingly against the Albigensians. The Dominicans, founded in 1206, followed in this practice and approach. In 1209, after decades of having called upon secular rulers for aid in dealing with the Cathars and getting no response, Pope Innocent III and the king of France, Philip Augustus, began the military campaign against them. Scholars disagree, using two distinct lines of reasoning, on whether the brutal nature of the war that followed was determined more by the pope or by King Philip and his proxies.

According to historian Elaine Graham-Leigh, Pope Innocent believed the tactical, as well as policy and strategic decisions, should be solely "the papal preserve". J. Sumption and Stephen O'Shea paint Innocent III as "the mastermind of the crusade".

Markale suggests the true architect of the campaign was the French king Philip Augustus, stating that "it was Phillip who actually petitioned Innocent for permission to conduct the Crusade." Historian Laurence W. Marvin says the pope exercised "little real control over events in Occitania." Konrad Repgen writes: "The Albigensian war was indisputably a case of the interlinking of religion and politics."

===== Massacre at Béziers =====
On 22 July 1209, in the first battle of the Albigensian Crusade, mercenaries rampaged through the streets of Béziers, killing and plundering. Those citizens who could, sought refuge in the Churches and cathedrals, but there was no safety from the raging mob. The doors of the Churches were broken open, and all inside were slaughtered.

Some twenty years later, a story that historian Laurence W. Marvin calls apocryphal, arose about this event claiming the papal legate, Arnaud Amaury, the leader of the crusaders, was said to have responded: "Kill them all, let God sort them out." Marvin says it is unlikely the legate ever said any thing at all. "The speed and spontaneity of the attack indicates that the legate probably did not know what was going on until it was over." Marvin adds they did not kill them all at any rate: "clearly most of Bezier's population and buildings survived" and the city "continued to function as a major population center" after the campaign.

Other scholars say the legate probably did say it, that the statement is not inconsistent with what was recorded by the contemporaries of other church leaders, or with what is known of Arnaud Amaury's character and attitudes toward heresy. Religious toleration was not considered a virtue by the people or the Church of the High Middle Ages. Historians W A Sibly and M D Sibly point out that: "contemporary accounts suggest that, at this stage, the crusaders did not intend to spare those who resisted them, and the slaughter at Béziers was consistent with this."

The pope's response was not prompt, but four years after the massacre at Béziers, in a 1213 letter to Amaury, the pope rebuked the legate for his "greedy" conduct in the war. He also canceled crusade indulgences for Languedoc, and called for an end to the campaign. The campaign continued anyway. The pope was not reversed until the Fourth Lateran council re-instituted crusade status two years later in 1215; afterwards, the pope removed it yet again. Still, the campaign did not end for another 16 years. It was completed in what Marvin refers to as "an increasingly murky moral atmosphere" since there was technically no longer any crusade, no dispensational rewards for fighting it, the papal legates exceeded their orders from the pope, and the army occupied lands of nobles who were in the good graces of the Church.

== Late Middle Ages (c. 1200 – c. 1400) ==
=== Historical background ===
"People living during what a modern historian has termed the 'calamitous' fourteenth century were thrown into confusion and despair". Plague, famine and war ravaged most of the continent. Add to this, social unrest, urban riots, peasant revolts and renegade feudal armies. From its pinnacle of power in the 13th century, the Church entered a period of decline, internal conflict, and corruption and was unable to provide moral leadership. In 1302, Pope Boniface VIII (1294–1303) issued Unam sanctam, a papal bull proclaiming the superiority of the pope over all secular rulers. Philip IV of France responded by sending an army to arrest the pope. Boniface fled for his life and died shortly thereafter. "This episode revealed that the popes were no match for the feudal kings" and showed there had been a marked decline in papal prestige. George Garnett says the implementation of the papal monarchial idea had led to the loss of prestige, as the more efficient the papal bureaucratic machine became, the further it alienated the people, and the further it declined. Theologian Roger Olson says the Church reached its nadir from 1309 to 1377 when there were three different men claiming to be the rightful pope.

"What the observer of the papacy witnessed in the second half of the thirteenth century was a gradual, though clearly perceptible, decomposition of Europe as a single ecclesiastical unit, and the fragmentation of Europe into independent, autonomous entities which were soon to be called national monarchies or states. This fragmentation heralded the withering away of the papacy as a governing institution operating on a universal scale." ...The [later] Reformation only administered the coup de grâce."

According to Walter Ullmann, the Church lost "the moral, spiritual and authoritative leadership it had built up in Europe over the centuries of minute, consistent, detailed, dynamic forward-looking work. ... The papacy was now forced to pursue policies which, in substance, aimed at appeasement and were no longer directive, orientating and determinative." Ullmann goes on to explain that Christian thought of this age lost its objective standpoint, which had been based on Christianity's view of an objective world order and the pope's place in that order. This was now replaced by the subjective point of view with the man taking precedence over the office. In the turmoil of nationalism and ecclesiastical confusion, some theologians began aligning themselves more with their kings than with the Church. Devoted and virtuous nuns and monks became increasingly rare. Monastic reform had been a major force in the High Middle Ages but is largely unknown in the Late Middle Ages.

This led to the development in Christian thought of lay piety—the Devotio Moderna—the new devotion, which worked toward the ideal of a pious society of ordinary non-ordained people and, ultimately, to the Reformation and the development of the concepts of tolerance and religious freedom.

=== Response to reform ===
Advocates of lay piety who called for church reform met strong resistance from the popes. John Wycliffe (1320–1384) urged the Church to give up ownership of property, which produced much of the Church's wealth, and to once again embrace poverty and simplicity. He urged the Church to stop being subservient to the state and its politics. He denied papal authority. John Wycliff died of a stroke, but his followers, called Lollards, were declared heretics. After the Oldcastle rebellion many of its adherents were killed.

Jan Hus (1369–1415) accepted some of Wycliff's views and aligned with the Bohemian Reform movement which was also rooted in popular piety and owed much to the evangelical preachers of fourteenth century Prague. In 1415, Hus was called to the Council of Constance where his ideas were condemned as heretical and he was handed over to the state and burned at the stake. It was at the same Council of Constance that Paulus Vladimiri presented his treatise arguing that Christian and pagan nations could co-exist in peace.

The Fraticelli, who were also known as the "Little Brethren" or "Spiritual Franciscans", were dedicated followers of Saint Francis of Assisi. These Franciscans honored their vow of poverty and saw the wealth of the Church as a contributor to corruption and injustice when so many lived in poverty. They criticized the worldly behavior of many churchmen. Thus, the Brethren were declared heretical by John XXII (1316–1334) who was called "the banker of Avignon".

The leader of the brethren, Bernard Délicieux (c. 1260–1270 – 1320) was well known as he had spent much of his life battling the Dominican-run inquisitions. After torture and threat of excommunication, he confessed to the charge of interfering with the inquisition, and was defrocked and sentenced to life in prison, in chains, in solitary confinement, and to receive nothing but bread and water. The judges attempted to ameliorate the harshness of this sentence due to his age and frailty, but Pope John XXII countermanded them and delivered the friar to Inquisitor Jean de Beaune. Délicieux died shortly thereafter in early 1320.

=== Modern inquisitions ===
Although inquisitions had always included a political aspect, the Inquisitions of the Late Middle Ages became more political and highly notorious. "The long history of the Inquisition divides easily into two major parts: its creation by the medieval papacy in the early thirteenth century, and its transformation between 1478 and 1542 into permanent secular governmental bureaucracies: the Spanish, Portuguese, and Roman Inquisitions... all of which endured into the nineteenth century."

Historian Helen Rawlings says, "the Spanish Inquisition was different [from earlier inquisitions] in one fundamental respect: it was responsible to the crown rather than the pope and was used to consolidate state interest." It was authorized by the pope, yet the initial inquisitors proved so severe that the pope almost immediately opposed it, to no avail. Early in 1483, the king and queen established a council, the Consejo de la Suprema y General Inquisición, to govern the inquisition and chose Tomas de Torquemada to head it as inquisitor general. In October 1483, a papal bull conceded control to the crown. According to José Cassanova, the Spanish Inquisition became the first truly national, unified and centralized state institution. After the 1400s, few Spanish inquisitors were from the religious orders.

The Portuguese Inquisition was also fully controlled by the crown from its beginnings. The crown established a government board, known as the General Council, to oversee it. The Grand Inquisitor, who was chosen by the king, was always a member of the royal family. The first statute of limpieza de sangre (purity of blood) appeared in Toledo in 1449 and was later adopted in Portugal as well. Initially, these statutes were condemned by the Church, but in 1555, the highly corrupt Pope Alexander VI approved a "blood purity" statute for one of the religious orders. In his history of the Portuguese Inquisition, Giuseppe Marcocci says there is a deep connection between the rise of the Felipes in Portugal, the growth of the inquisition, and the adoption of the statutes of purity of blood which spread and increased and were more concerned with ethnic ancestry than religion.

Historian T. F. Mayer writes that "the Roman Inquisition operated to serve the papacy's long standing political aims in Naples, Venice and Florence." Under Paul III and his successor Julius III, and under most of the popes thereafter, the Roman Inquisition's activity was relatively restrained and its command structure was considerably more bureaucratic than those of other inquisitions. Where the medieval Inquisition had focused on heresy and the disturbance of public order, the Roman Inquisition was concerned with orthodoxy of a more intellectual, academic nature. The Roman Inquisition is probably best known for its condemnation of the difficult and cantankerous Galileo which was more about "bringing Florence to heel" than about heresy.

=== Northern (Baltic) crusades ===
Baltic Tribes c. 1200

The Northern (or Baltic Crusades), went on intermittently from 1147 to 1316, and according to Eric Christiansen, they had multiple causes. Christiansen writes that, from the days of Charlemagne, the free pagan people living around the Baltic Sea in northern Europe raided the countries that surrounded them: Denmark, Prussia, Germany and Poland. In the eleventh century, various German and Danish nobles responded militarily to put a stop to it and make peace. They did achieve peace for a time, but it did not last; there was insurrection, which created a desire for more military response in the twelfth century.

Another factor adding to the desire for military action was the result of the longstanding German tradition of sending Christian missionaries to the area northeast of Germany, known as the Wendish, meaning Slavic "frontier", which often resulted in the untimely death of said missionaries.

Dragnea and Christiansen indicate the primary motive for war was the noble's desire for territorial expansion and material wealth in the form of land, furs, amber, slaves, and tribute. The princes wanted to subdue these pagan peoples, through conquering and conversion, but ultimately, they wanted wealth. Iben Fonnesberg-Schmidt says, the princes were motivated by their desire to extend their power and prestige, and conversion was not always an element of their plans. When it was, conversion by these princes was almost always as a result of conquest, either by the direct use of force or indirectly when a leader converted and required it of his followers as well. There were often severe consequences for populations that chose to resist. For example, the conquest and conversion of Old Prussia resulted in the death of much of the native population, whose language subsequently became extinct.

According to Mihai Dragnea, these wars were part of the political reality of the twelfth century.

The popes became involved when Pope Eugenius III (1145–1153) called for a Second Crusade in response to the fall of Edessa in 1144 and the Saxon nobles refused to go to the Levant. In 1147, with Eugenius' Divini dispensatione, the German/Saxon nobles were granted full crusade indulgences to go to the Baltic area instead of the Levant. Eugenius' involvement did not lead to continuous papal support of these campaigns however. For the rest of the period after Eugenius, papal policy varied considerably. For example, Pope Alexander III, who was pope from 1159 to 1181, did not issue a full indulgence or put the Baltic campaigns on an equal footing with the crusades to the Levant. According to Iben Fonnesberg-Schmidt, after the Second crusade, the campaigns were planned, financed and carried out by princes, local bishops and local archbishops rather than popes until the arrival of the Teutonic order. The idea to employ crusaders seems to have originated with the local bishops. The nature of the campaigns changed when the Teutonic Order arrived in the region in 1230. The Danes regained influence in Estonia, the papacy became more involved, and the campaigns intensified and expanded.

==== Forced conversion and Christian thought ====
The Wendish crusade offers insights into new developments in Christian thought, particularly with respect to forced conversions. Ideas of peaceful conversion were rarely realized in these crusades because the monks and priests had to work with the secular rulers on their terms, and the military leaders seldom cared about taking the time for peaceful conversion. "While the theologians maintained that conversion should be voluntary, there was a widespread pragmatic acceptance of conversion obtained through political pressure or military coercion." The Church's acceptance of this led some commentators of the time to endorse and approve it, something Christian thought had not done previously. Dominican friars helped with this ideological justification. By portraying the pagans as possessed by evil spirits, they could assert the pagans were in need of conquest, persecution and force to free them; then they would become peacefully converted. Another example of how the use of forced conversion was justified to make it compatible with previous Church doctrine on the subject, can be found in a statement by Pope Innocent III in 1201:

[T]hose who are immersed even though reluctant, do belong to ecclesiastical jurisdiction at least by reason of the sacrament, and might therefore be reasonably compelled to observe the rules of the Christian Faith. It is, to be sure, contrary to the Christian Faith that anyone who is unwilling and wholly opposed to it should be compelled to adopt and observe Christianity. For this reason a valid distinction is made by some between kinds of unwilling ones and kinds of compelled ones. Thus one who is drawn to Christianity by violence, through fear and through torture, and receives the sacrament of Baptism in order to avoid loss, he (like one who comes to Baptism in dissimulation) does receive the impress of Christianity, and may be forced to observe the Christian Faith as one who expressed a conditional willingness though, absolutely speaking, he was unwilling ...

Eric Christiansen writes that "These crusades can only be properly understood in light of the Cistercian movement, the rise of papal monarchy, the mission of the friars, the coming of the Mongol hordes, the growth of the Muscovite and Lithuanian empires, and the aims of the Conciliar movement in the fifteenth century." The Conciliar movement arose out of the profound malaise within western Christendom over schism and corruption in the Church. It asked: where did ultimate authority in the Church reside? Did it reside in the pope, the body of cardinals who elected him, the bishops, or did it reside in the Christian community at large?

=== Conditional toleration and segregation ===
Conditional toleration that included discrimination was common everywhere in Europe of the Late Middle Ages and the Renaissance era. Prior to the Thirty Years' War, there was conditional toleration between Catholics and Protestants. While Frankfurt's Jews flourished between 1453 and 1613, their success came despite significant discrimination. They were restricted to one street, had rules concerning when they could leave it, and had to wear a yellow ring as a sign of their identity while outside. But within their community they also had some self-governance, their own laws, elected their own leaders, and had a Rabbinical school that became a religious and cultural center. "Officially, the medieval Catholic church never advocated the expulsion of all the Jews from Christendom, or repudiated Augustine's doctrine of Jewish witness... Still, late medieval Christendom frequently ignored its mandates..."

Political authorities of the day maintained order by keeping groups separated both legally and physically in what would be referred to in contemporary society as segregation. By the Late Middle Ages: "The maintenance of civil order through legislated separation and discrimination was part of the institutional structure of all European states ingrained in law, politics, and the economy."

== Early Modern Era (1500–1715) ==
=== Early Reformation (1500–1600) ===
Protestant Christians pioneered the concept of religious toleration. There was a concerted campaign for tolerance in mid-sixteenth century northwestern Switzerland in the town of Basle. Sebastian Castellio (1515–1563), who was among the earliest of the reformers to advocate both religious and political tolerance, had moved to Basle after he was exiled from France. Castellio's argument for toleration was essentially theological: "By casting judgment on the belief of others, don't you take the place of God?" However, since he also pled for social stability and peaceful co-existence, his argument was also political. Making similar arguments were Anabaptist David Joris (1501–1556) from the Netherlands and the Italian reformer Jacobus Acontius (1520–1566) who also gathered with Castellio in Basle. Other advocates of religious tolerance, Mino Celsi (1514–1576) and Bernardino Ochino (1487–1564), joined them, publishing their works on toleration in that city. By the end of the seventeenth and beginning of the eighteenth centuries, persecutions of unsanctioned beliefs had been reduced in most European countries.

One of the leading secular skeptics of tolerance in the sixteenth century was Leiden professor Justus Lipsius (1547–1606). He published Politicorum libri sex in 1589 which argued in favor of the persecution of religious dissenters. Lispius believed that plurality would lead to civil strife and instability, and said: "it is better to sacrifice one than to risk the collapse of the whole Commonwealth." Dirck Coornhurt responded by eloquently defending religious liberty using his belief that free access to what he saw as the ultimate truth in the scriptures would bring about harmony and stability.

Historians indicate that Lispius was not out of step with religious leaders in recognizing the problematic nature of reconciling religious tolerance with political reality. Luther saw this as well. He was fully in favor of religious toleration in 1523 writing that secular authorities should never fight heresy with the sword. Yet, after the Peasants War in Germany in 1524, Luther determined that lay authorities had an obligation to step in when sedition, peace, or the stability of society was part of the issue, thus he unintentionally echoed Augustine and Aquinas.

Geoffrey Elton says that the English reformer John Foxe (1517–1587) demonstrated his deep faith in religious toleration when he attempted to stop the execution of the English Catholic Edmund Campion and the five Dutch Anabaptists who had been sentenced to be burned in 1575.

=== Toleration from the Reformation to the Early Modern Era (1500–1715) ===
While the Protestant Reformation changed the face of Western Christianity forever, it still embraced Augustine's acceptance of coercion, and many regarded the death penalty for heresy as legitimate. Martin Luther had written against persecution in the 1520s, and had demonstrated genuine sympathy towards the Jews in his earlier writings, especially in Das Jesus ein geborener Jude sei (That Jesus was born as a Jew) from 1523, but after 1525 his position hardened. In Wider die Sabbather an einen guten Freund (Against the Sabbather to a Good Friend), 1538, he still considered a conversion of the Jews to Christianity as possible, but in 1543 he published On the Jews and their Lies, a "violent anti-semitic tract". John Calvin helped to secure the execution for heresy of Michael Servetus, although he unsuccessfully requested that he should be beheaded instead of being burned at the stake.

In England, John Foxe, John Hales, Richard Perrinchief, Herbert Thorndike and Jonas Proast all only saw mild forms of persecution against the English Dissenters as legitimate. Most dissenters disagreed with the Anglican Church only on secondary matters of worship and ecclesiology, and although this was a considered a serious sin, only a few seventeenth century Anglican writers thought that this 'crime' deserved the death penalty. The English Act of Supremacy significantly complicated the matter by securely welding Church and state.

The Elizabethan bishop Thomas Bilson was of the opinion that men ought to be "corrected, not murdered", but he did not condemn the Christian Emperors for executing the Manichaeans for "monstrous blasphemies". The Lutheran theologian Georgius Calixtus argued for the reconciliation of Christendom by removing all unimportant differences between Catholicism and Protestantism, and Rupertus Meldenius advocated in necessariis unitas, in dubiis libertas, in omnibus caritas (in necessary things unity; in uncertain things freedom; in everything compassion) in 1626.

==== The English Protestant "call for toleration" ====
In his book on the English Reformation, the late A. G. Dickens argued that from the beginning of the Reformation there had "existed in Protestant thought – in Zwingli, Melanchthon and Bucer, as well as among the Anabaptists – a more liberal tradition, which John Frith was perhaps the first to echo in England". Condemned for heresy, Frith was burnt at the stake in 1533. In his own mind, he died not because of the denial of the doctrines on purgatory and transubstantiation but "for the principle that a particular doctrine on either point was not a necessary part of a Christian's faith". In other words, there was an important distinction to be made between a genuine article of faith and other matters where a variety of very different conclusions should be tolerated within the Church. This stand against unreasonable and profligate dogmatism meant that Frith, "to a greater extent than any other of our early Protestants", upheld "a certain degree of religious freedom".

Frith was not alone. John Foxe, for example, "strove hard to save Anabaptists from the fire, and he enunciated a sweeping doctrine of tolerance even towards Catholics, whose doctrines he detested with every fibre of his being".

In the early seventeenth century, Thomas Helwys was a principal formulator of that distinctively Baptist request: that the Church and the state be kept separate in matters of law, so that individuals might have a freedom of religious conscience. Helwys said the King "is a mortal man, and not God, therefore he hath no power over the mortal soul of his subjects to make laws and ordinances for them and to set spiritual Lords over them". King James I had Helwys thrown into Newgate prison, where he had died by 1616 at about the age of forty.

By the time of the English Revolution, Helwys' stance on religious toleration was more commonplace. While accepting their zeal in desiring a "godly society", some contemporary historians doubt whether the English Puritans during the English Revolution were as committed to religious liberty and pluralism as traditional histories have suggested. However, historian John Coffey's recent work emphasizes the contribution of a minority of radical Protestants who steadfastly sought toleration for heresy, blasphemy, Catholicism, non-Christian religions, and even atheism. This minority included the Seekers, as well as the General Baptists and the Levellers. Their witness of these groups together demanded the Church be an entirely voluntary, non-coercive community able to evangelize in a pluralistic society governed by a purely civil state.

In 1644 the "Augustinian consensus concerning persecution was irreparably fractured." This year can be identified quite exactly, because 1644 saw the publication of John Milton's Areopagitica, William Walwyn's The Compassionate Samaritane, Henry Robinson's Liberty of Conscience and Roger Williams' The Bloudy Tenent of Persecution. These authors were Puritans or had dissented from the Church of England, and their radical Protestantism led them to condemn religious persecution, which they saw as a popish corruption of primitive Christianity. Other non-Anglican writers advocating toleration were Richard Overton, John Wildman and John Goodwin, the Baptists Samuel Richardson and Thomas Collier and the Quakers Samuel Fisher and William Penn. Anglicans who argued against persecution were: John Locke, Anthony Ashley-Cooper, 1st Earl of Shaftesbury, James Harrington, Jeremy Taylor, Henry More, John Tillotson and Gilbert Burnet.

All of these individuals considered themselves Christians or were actual churchmen. John Milton and John Locke are the predecessors of modern liberalism. Although Milton was a Puritan and Locke an Anglican, Areopagitica and A Letter concerning Toleration are canonical liberal texts. Only from the 1690s onwards did the philosophy of Deism emerge, and with it a third group that advocated religious toleration. But, unlike the radical Protestants and the Anglicans, the deists also rejected biblical authority; this group prominently includes Voltaire, Frederick II of Prussia, Joseph II, Holy Roman Emperor, Thomas Jefferson and the English-Irish philosopher John Toland. When Toland published the writings of Milton, Edmund Ludlow and Algernon Sidney, he tried to downplay the Puritan divinity in these works.

In 1781, the Holy Roman Emperor, Joseph II, issued the Patent of Toleration which guaranteed the practice of religion by the Evangelical Lutheran and the Reformed Church in Austria. For the first time after the Counter-Reformation, the political and legal process of religious equality officially began.

Following the debates that started in the 1640s, the Church of England was the first Christian church to grant adherents of other Christian denominations freedom of worship with the Act of Toleration 1689, which nevertheless still retained some forms of religious discrimination and did not include toleration for Catholics. Even today, only individuals who are members of the Church of England at the time of the succession may become the British monarch.

=== Witches (1450–1750) ===
Renaissance, Reformation and witch hunts occurred in the same centuries. Stuart Clark indicates that is no coincidence, that instead, these different aspects of a single age are representative of a world in the process of revolutionizing its way of thinking and understanding. Clark says that understanding one aspect of the age, such as the witch hunts, can lead to a greater understanding of another, such as the development of tolerance.

Until the 1300s, the official position of the Roman Catholic Church was that witches did not exist. In medieval canon law, Christian thought on this subject is represented by a passage called the Canon Episcopi. Alan Charles Kors explains that the Canon is skeptical that witches exist while still allowing the existence of demons and the devil. By the mid-fifteenth century, popular conceptions of witches changed dramatically, and Christian thought denying witches and witchcraft was being challenged by the Dominicans and being debated within the Church. While historians have been unable to pinpoint a single cause of what became known as the "witch frenzy", all have acknowledged that a new but common stream of thought developed in society, as well as in some parts of the Church, that witches were both real and malevolent.

Scholarly views on what caused this change fall into three categories: those who say the learned in the Church spread it, those who say popular tradition did so, and those who say witchcraft was actually being practiced. Of these three possibilities, Ankarloo and Clark indicate the main pressure to prosecute witches came from the common people, and trials were mostly civil trials. Everywhere in Europe, the higher up in either the ecclesiastical or the secular court system a case went, the more reluctance and reservations there were, with most cases ending up dismissed. In regions that were the most centralized, appellate jurisdictions acted in a restraining capacity, but areas of weak regimes, lacking strong legal or political control, were a disaster for witches. Witch trials were more prevalent in regions where the Catholic church was weakest (Germany, Switzerland and France), while in areas with a strong church presence (Spain, Poland and Eastern Europe) the witch craze was negligible.

Eventually, Christian thought solidified behind Cautio Criminalis (Precautions for Prosecutors) which was written by Friedrich Spee, in 1631. As a Jesuit priest, he personally witnessed witch trials in Westphalia. Driven by his priestly charge of enacting Christian charity, he describes the inhumane torture of the rack with the graphic language of the truly horrified saying, "it makes my blood boil." As a professor, Spee sought to expose the flawed arguments and methods used by the Dominican witch-hunters along with any authority who allowed it, including the emperor. Spee's primary methods for doing so were sarcasm, ridicule and piercing logic. The moral impression of his book was great, and it brought about the abolition of witch trials in a number of places, and led to its gradual decline in others. Witch trials became scant in the second half of the seventeenth century and eventually simply subsided. No one can explain, definitively, why they ended any more than they can explain why they began.

== Modern era ==
=== Roman Catholic policy ===
In 1892, Pope Leo XIII (1810–1903) confirmed Thomas Aquinas's view of tolerance as a necessary aspect of governing well in Acta Leonis XIII 205.

On 7 December 1965, the Catholic Church's Vatican II council issued the decree "Dignitatis humanae", which addressed the rights of the person and communities to social and civil liberty in religious matters. The Vatican II document Nostra Aetate absolved the Jewish people of any charge of deicide and affirmed that God has always remained faithful to his covenant with Israel.

In 1987, Pope John Paul II appealed to the world to recognize religious freedom as a fundamental human right. Pope John Paul II was quoted by the Los Angeles Times as saying: "Religious freedom, an essential requirement of the dignity of every person, is a cornerstone of the structure of human rights, and for this reason, an irreplaceable factor in the good of individuals and of the whole of society as well as of the personal fulfillment of each individual." On 12 March 2000, he prayed for forgiveness because "Christians have often denied the Gospel; yielding to a mentality of power, they have violated the rights of ethnic groups and peoples, and shown contempt for their cultures and religious traditions."

=== Protestant Christian thought ===
After World War II and the Holocaust, many Protestant theologians began to reassess Christian theology's antisemitism, and as a result, felt compelled to reject the doctrine of supersessionism. Numerous leading Christian thinkers continue to find "keys to truth" in ancient writings such as Augustine's Confessions, and Aquinas's Summa Theologica. Modern discussions of the Kingdom of God are still influenced by the nineteenth century view of the eschatological Jesus.

Colin Gunton and Richard Swinburn use traditional motifs to creatively reinterpret atonement theories in ways that are not reliant on beliefs rejected by most contemporary Christians, such as demonology or the belief in witches. They do not employ the morally objectionable transfer of liability and still effectively convey their belief that Jesus's death is more than just a moral example.

Today's debates over inclusivity reach to the heart of what it means to be a Christian both theologically and practically. Bruce L. McCormack says that is why Karl Barth's theology of neo-orthodoxy remains popular even in the "post-modern" twenty-first century. Though Barth advocates the exclusive Jesus-centered discipleship of orthodoxy, his view is also inherently inclusive, since, in his view, every human is among those God has set apart for that discipleship.

=== Contemporary global persecution and sociology ===
"The exceptional character of persecution in the Latin West since the twelfth century has lain not in the scale or savagery of particular persecutions, ... but in its capacity for sustained long-term growth. The patterns, procedures and rhetoric of persecution, which were established in the twelfth century, have given it the power of infinite and indefinite self-generation and self-renewal."

Tolerance, as a value, has grown out of humanity's experiences with social conflict and persecution, and is part of the legacy garnered from this. But there are also ideals similar to the concept of modern tolerance throughout the history of Christian thought (and philosophy and other religious thought) that can be seen as the long and somewhat torturous "prehistory" of tolerance. The Peace of Westphalia in 1648 included the first statement of freedom of religion in modern history. In the twenty-first century, nearly all contemporary societies in the world include religious freedom in their constitutions or other national proclamations in support of human rights. However, at the symposium on law and religion in 2014, Michelle Mack said: "Despite what appears to be near-universal expression of commitment to religious human rights, ... violations of freedom of religion and belief, including acts of severe persecution, occur with fearful frequency." In 1981, Israeli scholar Yoram Dinstein wrote that freedom of religion is "the most persistently violated human right in the annals of the species". In 2018, the U.S. Department of State, which releases annual reports in which it documents varying types of restrictions which are imposed on religious freedom around the world, detailed country by country, the violations of religious freedom which are taking place in approximately 75% of the 195 countries in the world.

R. I. Moore says that persecution during the Middle Ages "provides a striking illustration of classic deviance theory as it was propounded by the father of sociology, Emile Durkheim". Strong social-group identities, with attitudes of group loyalty, solidarity, and highly perceived benefits of belonging, make it likely that an individual or a group will become intolerant when identity is threatened. This indicates intolerance is more of a social process, tied to social identity, than an ideological one.

Contemporary persecution is often part of a larger conflict involving emerging states and established states in the process of redefining their national identity. For example, Christianity in Iraq dates from the Apostolic era in what was then Persia; the U.S. Department of State identified 1.4 million Christians in Iraq in 1991 when the Gulf War began. By 2010, the number of Christians dropped to 700,000 and it is currently estimated there are between 200,000 and 450,000 Christians left in Iraq. During that period, actions against Christians included the burning and bombing of churches, the bombing of Christian owned businesses and homes, kidnapping, murder, demands for protection money, and anti-Christian rhetoric in the media with those responsible saying they wanted to rid the country of its Christians.

Serbia has been Christian since the Christianization of Serbs by Clement of Ohrid and Saint Naum in the ninth century. Within a relatively peaceful Serbia, the province of Kosovo has long been a site of ethnic and religious tensions. In the 1990s, it drew attention for frequent discrimination and acts of violence toward Albanians: 90% of Kosovo's Albanian population is Muslim. Eventually, Kosovo erupted in a full-scale ethnic cleansing, resulting in armed intervention by the United Nations in 1999. Serbs attacked Albanian villages, killed and brutalized inhabitants, burned down houses, and forced them to leave. By the end of 1998, approximately 3000 Islamic Albanians had been killed and more than 300,000 expelled. By the end of the "action", around 800,000 of the roughly two million Albanians had fled.

== See also ==
- Criticism of Christianity
- History of Christianity
- History of Christian theology
- Christianity in the 4th century
- Christianity and violence
- Role of Christianity in civilization
- Violence against Christians in India
