= Stanley Kent Stowers =

American historian

- Born: 1948 (age 77–78); United States
- Education: Yale University
- Occupations: historian, author
- Scientific career
- Fields: History
- Workplaces: Brown University

Stanley Kent Stowers (born 1948) is a historian of ancient Mediterranean religion and a theorist of religion. He taught at Brown University for 31 years and is now Emeritus Professor of Religious Studies. Working from a comparative analysis of Greek, Roman, Judean, and Christian evidence, he has developed a theory of ancient Mediterranean religion, and of religion more generally. He is also known for his publications on the early Christianity and especially the letters of Paul. He has also published on National Socialism (“Nazism”) and religion and on the early modern invention of monotheism.

== Biography ==
He was born in 1948. He currently resides in Tiverton, Rhode Island. He completed his BA degree at the Abilene Christian University in 1970. He completed his M.A. degree at the Princeton Theological Seminary in 1974. He completed his Ph.D. in Religious Studies at Yale University in 1979.

== Academic career ==
Stowers received his academic training in the study of religion and ancient history and joined the faculty of Brown University, where he taught for over three decades. During his career at Brown, he supervised numerous graduate students who later became prominent scholars in religious studies and related fields. He retired with emeritus status and has continued to publish major scholarly works.

== Research and scholarly contributions ==
Stowers’s work is characterized by a comparative approach to ancient Mediterranean evidence, drawing on Greek, Roman, Judean, and early Christian sources. His scholarship has been influential in several major areas.

=== Paul and early Christianity ===
Stowers is widely known for his reinterpretation of Paul the apostle as a Judean thinker who did not understand himself to be founding a new religion. His approach is most fully articulated in A Rereading of Romans: Justice, Jews, and Gentiles (1994). Although initially controversial, the book has had a lasting impact on Pauline studies and contributed to later developments sometimes described as the “radical new perspective” on Paul. Its influence is reflected in sustained scholarly engagement, including a dedicated session at the Society of Biblical Literature marking the book’s twenty-fifth anniversary.

In related work, Stowers developed a new account of “participation in Christ,” interpreting it in light of ancient philosophical and ontological traditions, particularly Stoic and Platonist thought.

=== Ancient Mediterranean religion ===
A central theme of Stowers’s later work is the argument that early Christianity emerged from within ancient Mediterranean religious practices rather than as a fundamentally distinct or alien phenomenon. He develops this position through a comparative theory of ancient Mediterranean religion, emphasizing ritual practice, social belonging, and the embeddedness of religious life in ancient societies.

This approach is synthesized in Christian Beginnings: A Study in Ancient Mediterranean Religion (2024) and History and the Study of Religion: The Ancient Mediterranean as a Test Case (2024), both of which draw together decades of previously published research.

=== Theory of religion ===
In addition to his historical work, Stowers has made significant contributions to the theory of religion. Drawing on cognitive psychology and the philosophy of science, he argues that religion should be understood as a “social kind” rather than as a system defined primarily by belief. This theoretical position has been developed over many years and presented most fully in History and the Study of Religion.

== Reception ==
Stowers’s work has been widely discussed in biblical studies, the study of ancient religion, and the theory of religion. Scholars such as John Gager and Magnus Zetterholm have identified his work as marking a significant shift in the study of Paul. His work has been reviewed in Bryn Mawr Classical Review.

== Awards and honours ==
Stowers received Woodrow Wilson Center Fellowship in 1992, National Endowment for the Humanities Summer Fellowship in 1991, National Endowment for the Humanities Fellowship for University Teachers in 1991, FIAT Fellowship to the Officina dei Papiri, Biblioteca Nazionale, Naples in 1990, Wayland Collegium Grants in 1982, and National Endowment for the Humanities Seminar for College Teachers in 1980.

In 1997, he received the Harriet W. Sheridan Award for Distinguished Contributions to Teaching and Learning at Brown University.

Among many invited lectureships, he was Visiting Professor at the University of Bologna, Spring 2001, and Visiting Fellow at Macquarie University, Spring 2006.

== Bibliography ==
He is the author of a number of books:

- Letter Writing in Greco-Roman Antiquity
- A Rereading of Romans: Justice, Jews, and Gentiles
- History and the Study of Religion: The Ancient Mediterranean
- Christian Beginnings: A Study in Ancient Mediterranean Religion
- The Diatribe and Paul's Letter to the Romans

== See also ==
- Paul the Apostle
- Origenist crises
