= Jerome Karabel =

American sociologist

Jerome Bernard Karabel (born May 20, 1950) is an American sociologist, political and social commentator, and professor of sociology at the University of California, Berkeley. He has written extensively on American institutions of higher education and on various aspects of social policy and history in the United States, often from a comparative perspective.

== Life and career ==
Karabel graduated from Phillips Exeter Academy (1968). He holds a BA (1972) and Ph.D. (1977) from Harvard University, and also conducted postgraduate studies at Nuffield College at Oxford University in England and at the Ecole des Hautes Etudes in Paris, France. He has been a recipient of grants from the National Science Foundation, the National Institute of Education, and the Ford Foundation. In 2009-2010, Karabel was a Fellow at the Woodrow Wilson International Center for Scholars in Washington DC, where he was working on a project entitled “American Exceptionalism, Social Well-Being, and the Quality of Life in the United States.”

Karabel is the author of The Chosen: The Hidden History of Admission and Exclusion at Harvard, Yale, and Princeton (2005), which received the Distinguished Scholarly Book Award from the American Sociological Association. He is also co-author (with Steven Brint) of The Diverted Dream: Community Colleges and the Promise of Educational Opportunity in America, 1900-1985 (1989), which received the Outstanding Book Award from the American Educational Research Association. His research in the sociology of education explores notions of meritocracy, opportunity, access, and cultural capital in American higher education, and the role of the educational system in legitimating the existing social order.

In The Chosen, Karabel chronicles the admissions policies of Harvard, Yale, and Princeton over the course of the twentieth century, describing how new admissions criteria—including letters of recommendation, athletic and extracurricular achievements, and interviews, in addition to a student’s academic credentials—were first introduced in the 1920s in an effort to limit the number of Jewish students. Such starkly redefined measures of “merit” were institutionalized at these and other elite institutions over time, even as these schools later adapted such admission policies in response to growing demands for greater democratization and diversity during the mid and latter half of the twentieth century.

Karabel’s articles have been published in the American Sociological Review, Harvard Educational Review, Theory and Society, Social Forces, and Politics and Society among others. He is also a contributor to publications such as The New York Times, The Huffington Post, The New York Review of Books, The Nation, The Los Angeles Times, and Le Monde Diplomatique.

== Selected publications ==
- The Chosen: The Hidden History of Admission and Exclusion at Harvard, Yale, and Princeton (Houghton Mifflin, 2005) (Winner of the 2005 National Jewish Book Award).
- "Towards a Theory of Intellectuals and Politics," Theory and Society 25, no. 2 (April 1996): 205-233.
- The Diverted Dream: Community Colleges and the Promise of Educational Opportunity in America, 1990-1985, with Steven Brint (Oxford University Press, 1989).
- Power and Ideology in Education, co-edited with an introduction by A.H. Halsey (Oxford University Press, 1977).
