= Christianity and violence =

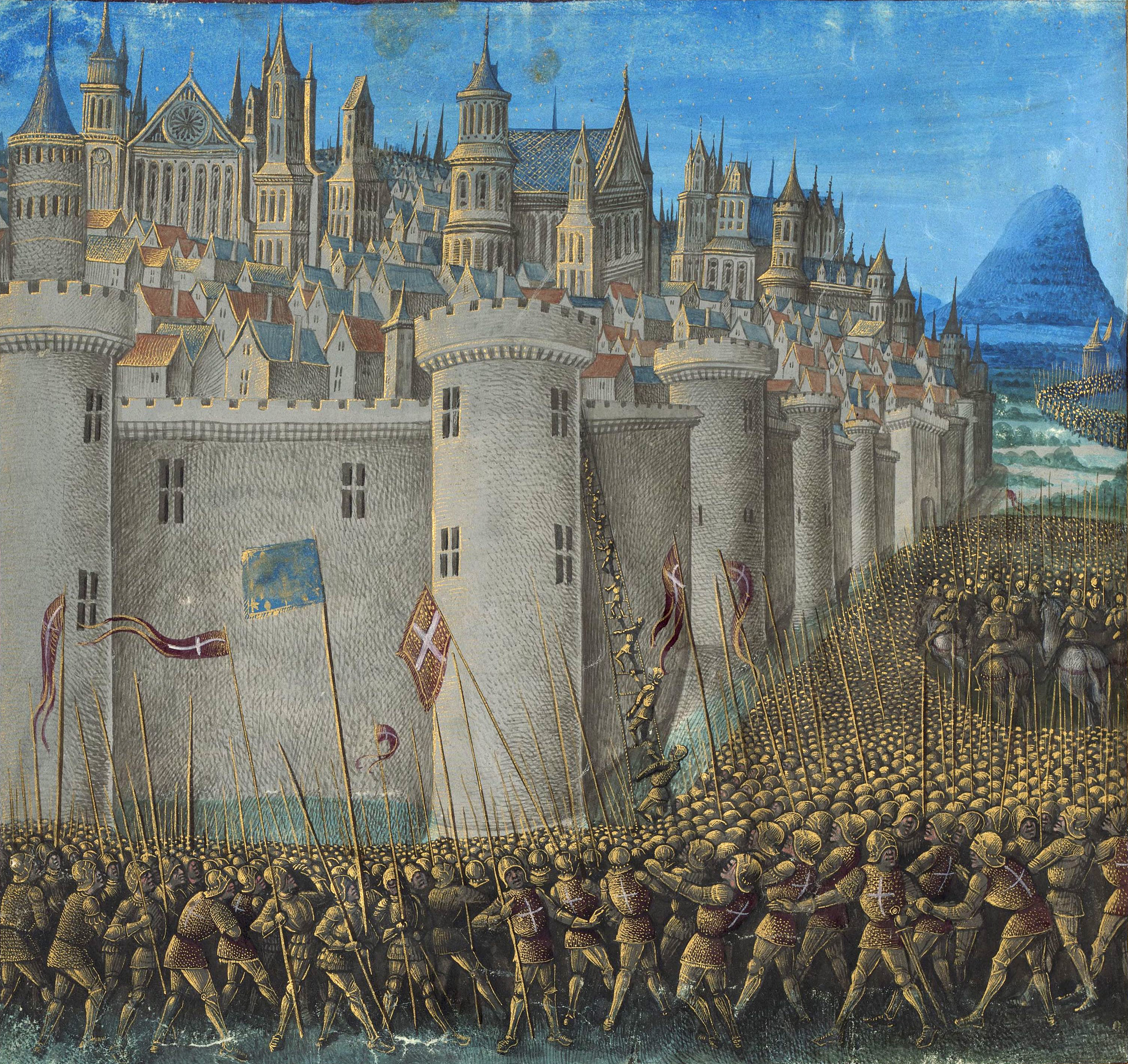
A battle scene from the First Crusade. The Crusades were a series of military campaigns which were mainly waged between European Christians and Muslims.

Christians have had diverse attitudes towards violence and nonviolence over time. Both currently and historically, there have been four attitudes towards violence and war and four resulting practices of them within Christianity: non-resistance, Christian pacifism, just war, and preventive war (Holy war, e.g., the Crusades). In the Roman Empire, the early church adopted a nonviolent stance when it came to war because the imitation of Jesus's sacrificial life was preferable to it. The concept of "Just War", the belief that limited uses of war were acceptable, originated in the writings of earlier non-Christian Roman and Greek thinkers such as Cicero and Plato. Later, this theory was adopted by Christian thinkers such as St. Augustine, who like other Christians, borrowed much of the just war concept from Roman law and the works of Roman writers like Cicero. Even though "Just War" concept was widely accepted early on, warfare was not regarded as a virtuous activity and expressing concern for the salvation of those who killed enemies in battle, regardless of the cause for which they fought, was common. Concepts such as "Holy war", whereby fighting itself might be considered a penitential and spiritually meritorious act, did not emerge before the 11th century.

== The Bible and violence ==
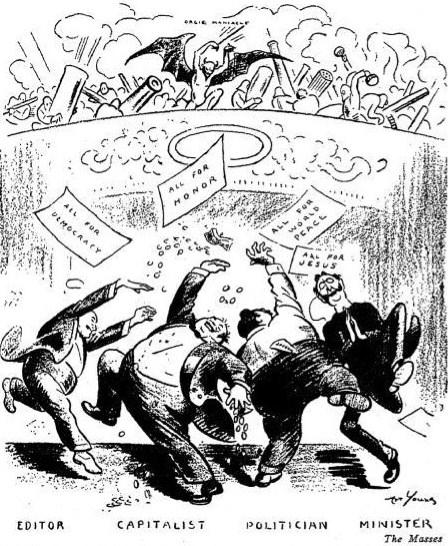
Having Their Fling (1917) by Art Young

The Bible contains several texts which encourage, command, condemn, reward, punish, regulate and describe acts of violence.

Leigh Gibson and Shelly Matthews, associate professor of religion at Furman University, write that some scholars, such as René Girard, "lift up the New Testament as somehow containing the antidote for Old Testament violence". According to John Gager, such an analysis risks advocating the views of the heresiarch Marcion of Sinope (c. 85–160), who made a distinction between the God of the Old Testament responsible for violence and the God of mercy found in the New Testament.

Mahatma Gandhi embraced the concept of nonviolence which he had found in both Indian Religions and the New Testament (e.g. Sermon on the Mount), which he then utilized in his strategy for social and political struggles.

== Christian violence ==
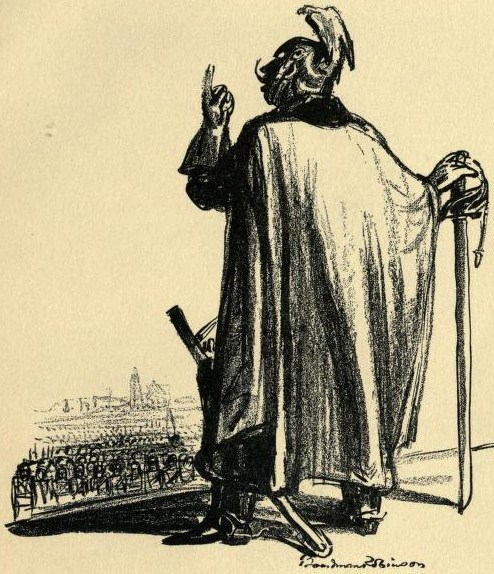
I Believe in the Sword and Almighty God (1914). Anti-militaristic cartoon by Boardman Robinson.

J. Denny Weaver, Professor Emeritus of Religion at Bluffton University, suggests that there are numerous evolving views on violence and nonviolence throughout the history of Christian theology. According to the view of many historians, the Constantinian shift turned Christianity from a persecuted into a persecuting religion.

Miroslav Volf has identified the intervention of a "new creation", as in the Second Coming, as a particular aspect of Christianity that generates violence. Writing about the latter, Volf says: "Beginning at least with Constantine's conversion, the followers of the Crucified have perpetrated gruesome acts of violence under the sign of the cross. Over the centuries, the seasons of Lent and Holy Week were, for the Jews, times of fear and trepidation. Muslims also associate the cross with violence; crusaders' rampages were undertaken under the sign of the cross."

The statement attributed to Jesus "I come not to bring peace, but to bring a sword" has been interpreted by some as a call to arms for Christians. Mark Juergensmeyer argues that "despite its central tenets of love and peace, Christianity—like most traditions—has always had a violent side. The bloody history of the tradition has provided disturbing images and violent conflict is vividly portrayed in the Bible. This history and these biblical images have provided the raw material for theologically justifying the violence of contemporary Christian groups. For example, attacks on abortion clinics have been viewed not only as assaults on a practice that Christians regard as immoral, but also as skirmishes in a grand confrontation between forces of evil and good that has social and political implications", sometimes referred to as spiritual warfare.

Higher law has been used to justify violence by Christians. The Cleansing of the Temple has sometimes been considered a violent act by Jesus, but some scholars note that the original text is more complex and, after grammatical analysis, conclude that the text does not describe a violent act of Jesus against the merchants themselves.

Historically, according to René Girard, many Christians embraced violence when it became the state religion of the Roman Empire: "Beginning with Constantine, Christianity triumphed at the level of the state and soon began to cloak with its authority persecutions similar to those in which the early Christians were victims."

=== Wars ===
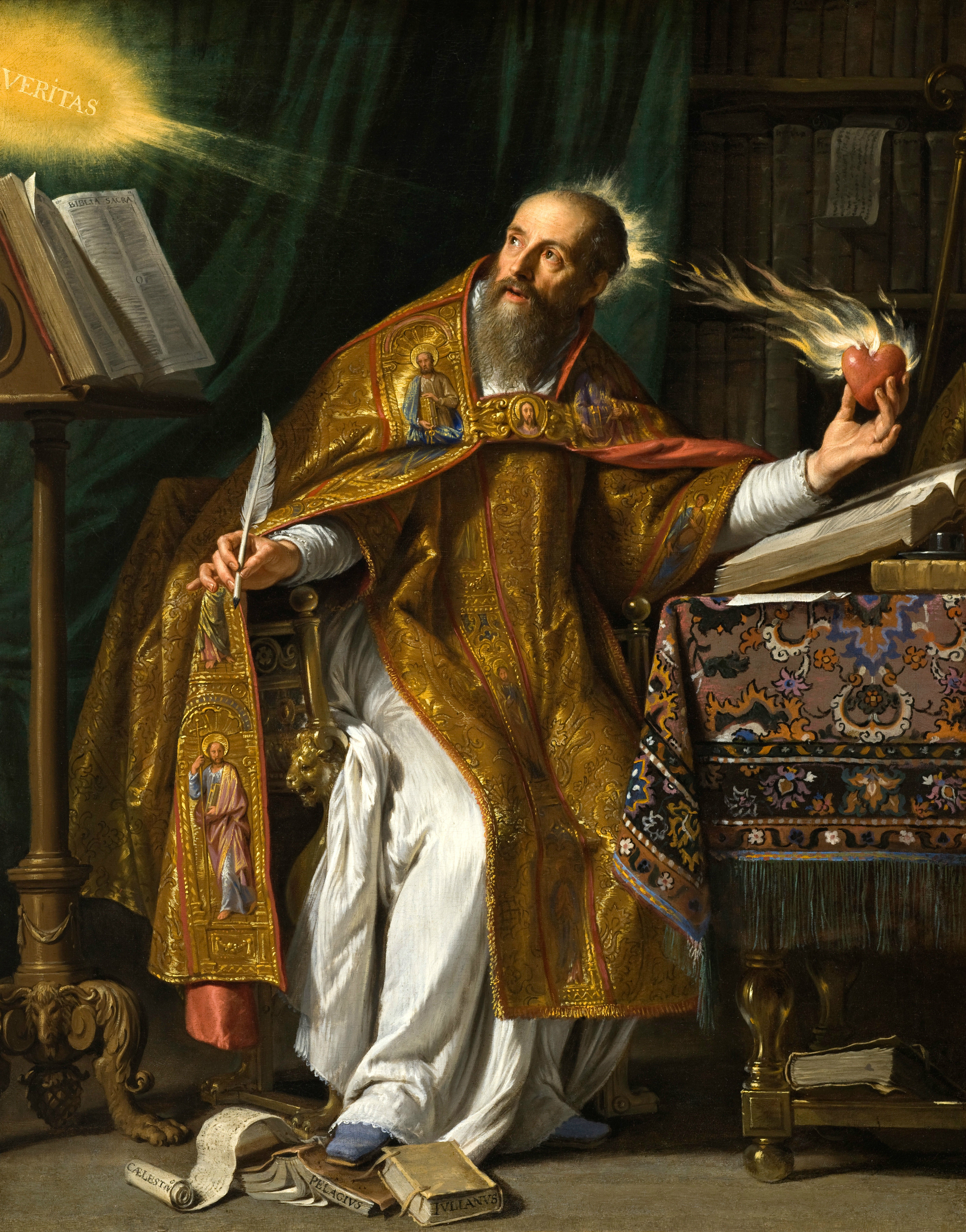
Saint Augustine of Hippo, a seminal thinker on the concept of just war

==== Attitudes towards the military before Constantine ====
The study of Christian participation in military service in the pre-Constantinian era has been highly contested and has generated a great deal of literature.

Through most of the twentieth century, a consensus was formed around Adolf von Harnack's view that the early church was pacifist, that during the second and third centuries, a growing accommodation of military service occurred, and by the time of Constantine, a just war ethic had arisen.

This consensus was challenged mostly by the work of John Helgeland in the 1970s and 1980s. He said that most of the early Christians opposed military service because they refused to practice the Roman religion and they also refused to perform the rituals of the Roman army, not because they were against killing. Helgeland also stated that there is a diversity of voices in the written literature, as well as evidence of a diversity of practices by Christians. George Kalantzis, Professor of Theology at Wheaton College, sided with Harnack in the debate writing that "literary evidence confirms the very strong internal coherence of the Church's non-violent stance for the first three centuries."

David Hunter has concluded that a "new consensus" has emerged and it includes aspects of Helgeland's and Harnack's views. Hunter suggests that the early Christians based their opposition to military service upon both their "aboherrence of Roman army religion" (Helgeland's view) and their opposition to bloodshed (Harnack's view). Hunter notes that there is evidence that by the 2nd century Christian practices had started to diverge from the theological principles espoused in early Christian literature. Hunter's third point of the "new consensus" is the assertion that the just war theory reflects at least one pre-Constantinian view. Finally, to these three points, Kreider added that Christian attitudes towards violence were likely varied in different geographical locations, pointing out that pro-militarist views were stronger in border areas then they were in "heartland" areas which were more strongly aligned with the Empire.

There is little evidence concerning the extent of Christian participation in the military; generalizations are usually speculation. A few gravestones of Christian soldiers have been found.

==== Just war ====
Just war theory is a doctrine of military ethics of Roman philosophical and Catholic origin studied by moral theologians, ethicists, and international policy makers, that holds that a conflict can and ought to meet the criteria of philosophical, religious or political justice, provided it follows certain conditions.

The concept of justification for war under certain conditions goes back at least to Roman and Greek thinkers such as Cicero and Plato. However its importance is connected to Christian medieval theory beginning from Augustine of Hippo and Thomas Aquinas. According to Jared Diamond, Augustine of Hippo played a critical role in delineating Christian thinking about what constitutes a just war, and about how to reconcile Christian teachings of peace with the need for war in certain situations. Partly inspired by Cicero's writings, Augustine held that war could be justified in order to preserve the state, rectify wrongs by neighboring nations, and expand the state if a tyrant will lose power in doing so.

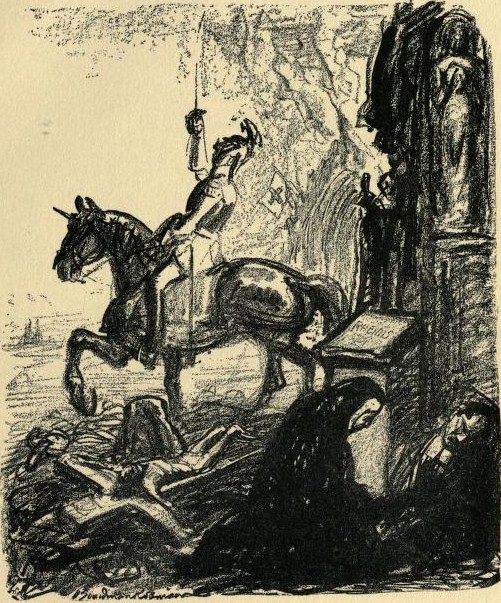
Forward with God! (1915). Anti-militaristic cartoon by Boardman Robinson.

In Ulrich Luz's formulation; "After Constantine, the Christians too had a responsibility for war and peace. Already Celsus asked bitterly whether Christians, by aloofness from society, wanted to increase the political power of wild and lawless barbarians. His question constituted a new actuality; from now on, Christians and churches had to choose between the testimony of the gospel, which included renunciation of violence, and responsible participation in political power, which was understood as an act of love toward the world." Augustine of Hippo's Epistle to Marcellinus (Ep 138) is the most influential example of the "new type of interpretation".

Just war theorists combine both a moral abhorrence towards war with a readiness to accept that war may sometimes be necessary. The criteria of the just war tradition act as an aid to determining whether resorting to arms is morally permissible. Just War theories are attempts "to distinguish between justifiable and unjustifiable uses of organized armed forces"; they attempt "to conceive of how the use of arms might be restrained, made more humane, and ultimately directed towards the aim of establishing lasting peace and justice."

The just war tradition addresses the morality of the use of force in two parts: when it is right to resort to armed force (the concern of jus ad bellum) and what is acceptable in using such force (the concern of jus in bello). In more recent years, a third category—jus post bellum—has been added, which governs the justice of war termination and peace agreements, as well as the prosecution of war criminals.

==== Holy War ====
In 1095, at the Council of Clermont, Pope Urban II declared that some wars could be deemed as not only a bellum iustum ("just war"), but could, in certain cases, rise to the level of a bellum sacrum (holy war). Jill Claster, dean of New York University College of Arts and Science, characterizes this as a "remarkable transformation in the ideology of war", shifting the justification of war from being not only "just" but "spiritually beneficial". Thomas Murphy examined the Christian concept of Holy War, asking "how a culture formally dedicated to fulfilling the injunction to 'love thy neighbor as thyself' could move to a point where it sanctioned the use of violence against the alien both outside and inside society". The religious sanctioning of the concept of "holy war" was a turning point in Christian attitudes towards violence; "Pope Gregory VII made the Holy War possible by drastically altering the attitude of the church towards war... Hitherto a knight could obtain remission of sins only by giving up arms, but Urban invited him to gain forgiveness 'in and through the exercise of his martial skills'." A holy war was defined by the Roman Catholic Church as "war that is not only just, but justifying; that is, a war that confers positive spiritual merit on those who fight in it".

In the 12th century, Bernard of Clairvaux wrote: "'The knight of Christ may strike with confidence and die yet more confidently; for he serves Christ when he strikes, and saves himself when he falls.... When he inflicts death, it is to Christ's profit, and when he suffers death, it is his own gain."

Jonathan Riley-Smith writes,

The consensus among Christians on the use of violence has changed radically since the crusades were fought. The just war theory prevailing for most of the last two centuries—that violence is an evil which can in certain situations be condoned as the lesser of evils—is relatively young. Although it has inherited some elements (the criteria of legitimate authority, just cause, right intention) from the older war theory that first evolved around a.d. 400, it has rejected two premises that underpinned all medieval just wars, including crusades: first, that violence could be employed on behalf of Christ's intentions for mankind and could even be directly authorized by him; and second, that it was a morally neutral force which drew whatever ethical coloring it had from the intentions of the perpetrators.

==== Genocidal warfare ====
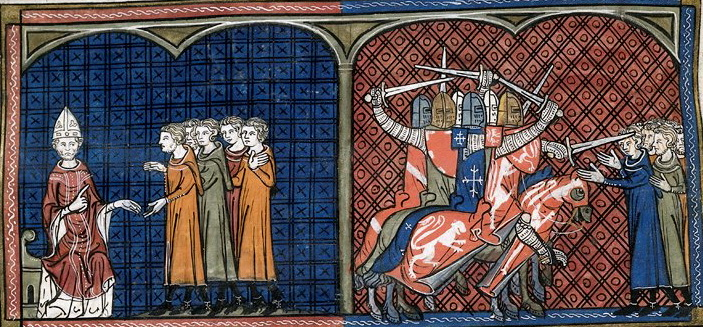
Pope Innocent III excommunicating the Albigensians (left), Massacre against the Albigensians by the crusaders

The Biblical account of Joshua and the Battle of Jericho was used to justify genocide against Catholics by Oliver Cromwell. Daniel Chirot, professor of Russian and Eurasian studies at the University of Washington, interprets 1 Samuel 15:1–3 as "the sentiment, so clearly expressed, that because a historical wrong was committed, justice demands genocidal retribution."

=== Inquisition ===
The Inquisition was a group of institutions within the judicial system of the Catholic Church whose aim was to combat heresy The Spanish Inquisition is often cited in popular literature and history as an example of Catholic intolerance and repression. The total number of people who were processed by the Inquisition throughout its history was approximately 150,000; applying the percentages of executions that appeared in the trials of 1560–1700—about 2%—the approximate total would be about 3,000 of them were put to death. However, the actual death toll was probably higher, according to the data which Dedieu and García Cárcel provided to the tribunals of Toledo and Valencia, respectively. It is likely that between 3,000 and 5,000 people were executed. About 50 people were executed by the Mexican Inquisition. Included in that total are 29 people who were executed as "Judaizers" between 1571 and 1700 out of 324 people who were prosecuted for practicing the Jewish religion.

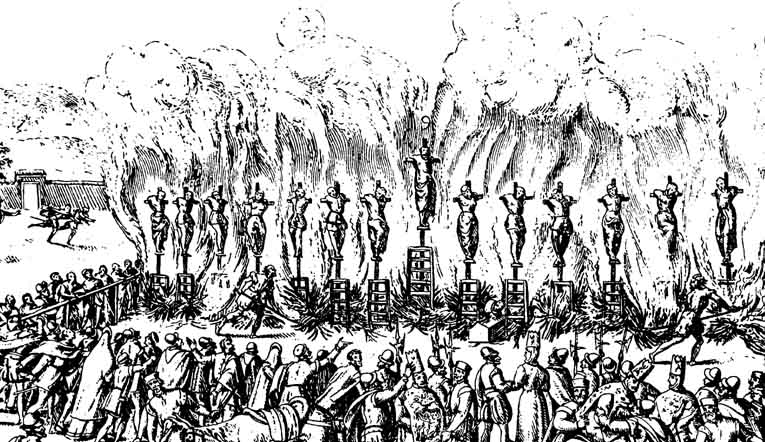
Contemporary illustration of the auto-da-fé of Valladolid, in which fourteen Protestants were burned at the stake for their faith, on May 21, 1559

In the Portuguese Inquisition, the major targets were people who had converted from Judaism to Catholicism, the Conversos, also known as New Christians or Marranos, because they were suspected of secretly practising Judaism. Many of these people were originally Spanish Jews, who had left Spain for Portugal. The number of victims of the Portuguese Inquisition is estimated to be around 40,000. One particular focus of the Spanish and Portuguese inquisitions was the issue of Jewish anusim and Muslim converts to Catholicism, partly because these minority groups were more numerous in Spain and Portugal than they were in many other parts of Europe, and partly because they were often considered suspect due to the assumption that they had secretly reverted to their former religions. The Goa Inquisition was the office of the Portuguese Inquisition which operated in Portuguese India, as well as in the rest of the Portuguese Empire in Asia. It was established in 1560, it was briefly suppressed from 1774 to 1778, and it was finally abolished in 1812. Based on the records that survive, H. P. Salomon and Rabbi Isaac S.D. Sassoon state that between the Inquisition's beginning in 1561 and its temporary abolition in 1774, some 16,202 persons were brought to trial by the Inquisition. Of this number, 57 of them were sentenced to death and executed, and another 64 were burned in effigy (this sentence was imposed on those persons who had either fled or died in prison; in the latter case, the executed person's remains and the effigy were both placed in a coffin and burned at the same time). Others were subjected to lesser punishments or penance, but the fate of many of those who were tried by the Inquisition is unknown.

During the second half of the 16th century, the Roman Inquisition was responsible for prosecuting individuals who were accused of committing a wide range of crimes which were related to religious doctrine, alternative religious doctrine or alternative religious beliefs. Out of 51,000–75,000 cases which were judged by the Inquisition in Italy after 1542, around 1,250 of them resulted in death sentences.

The period of witch trials in Early Modern Europe was a widespread moral panic caused by the belief that malevolent Satanic witches were operating as an organized threat to Christendom from the 15th to the 18th centuries. A variety of punishments was imposed upon those who were found guilty of witchcraft, including imprisonment, flogging, fines, or exile. In the Old Testament, Exodus 22:18 states that "Thou shalt not permit a sorceress to live". Many people faced capital punishment if they were convicted of witchcraft during this period, either by being burned at the stake, hanged on the gallows, or beheaded. Similarly, in the New England Colonies, people convicted of witchcraft were hanged (See Salem witch trials). The scholarly consensus on the total number of executions for witchcraft ranges from 40,000 to 60,000.

The legal basis for some inquisitorial activity came from Pope Innocent IV's papal bull Ad extirpanda of 1252, which explicitly authorized (and defined the appropriate circumstances for) the use of torture by the Inquisition for eliciting confessions from heretics. By 1256, inquisitors were given absolution if they used instruments of torture. "The overwhelming majority of sentences seem to have consisted of penances like wearing a cross sewn on one's clothes, going on pilgrimage, etc." When a suspect was convicted of unrepentant heresy, the inquisitorial tribunal was required by law to hand the person over to the secular authorities for final sentencing, at which point a magistrate would determine the penalty, which was usually burning at the stake although the penalty varied based on local law. The laws were inclusive of proscriptions against certain religious crimes (heresy, etc.), and the punishments included death by burning, although imprisonment for life or banishment would usually be used. Thus the inquisitors generally knew what would be the fate of anyone so remanded, and cannot be considered to have divorced the means of determining guilt from its effects.

Except for the Papal States, the institution of the Inquisition was abolished in Europe in the early 19th century, after the Napoleonic Wars and in the Americas, it was abolished after the Spanish American wars of independence. The institution survived as a part of the Roman Curia, but in 1904, it was renamed the "Supreme Sacred Congregation of the Holy Office". In 1965, it was renamed the Congregation for the Doctrine of the Faith.

=== Christian terrorism ===
Christian terrorism comprises terrorist acts that are committed by groups or individuals who use Christian motivations or goals as a justification for their actions. As with other forms of religious terrorism, Christian terrorists have relied on interpretations of the tenets of their faith—in this case, the Bible. Such groups have cited Old Testament and New Testament scriptures as justifications for acts of violence and killings or they have sought to bring about the "end times" which are described in the New Testament.

These interpretations are typically different from the interpretations of established Christian denominations.

The Lord's Resistance Army is a major group in central Africa that commits terrorist acts in the name of Christianity. They have been waging an insurgency against Uganda since 1987.

=== Forced conversions ===
After the Constantinian shift, Christianity became entangled in government. While anthropologists have shown that throughout history the relationship between religion and politics has been complex, there is no doubt that religious institutions, including Christian ones, have been used coercively by governments, and that they have used coercion themselves. Augustine advocated government force in his Epistle 185, A Treatise Concerning the Correction of the Donatists, justifying coercion from scripture. He cites Jesus striking Paul during Paul's vision on the road to Damascus. He also cites the parable of the great banquet in Luke 14:22–23. Such short term pain for the sake of eternal salvation was an act of charity and love, in his view.

Examples of forced conversion to Christianity include: the Christian persecution of paganism under Theodosius I, the forced conversion and violent assimilation of pagan tribes in medieval Europe, the Inquisition, including its manifestations in Goa, Mexico, Portugal, and Spain, the forced conversion of indigenous children in North America and Australia

=== Support of slavery ===
Early Christianity variously opposed, accepted, or ignored slavery. The early Christian perspectives on slavery were formed in the contexts of Christianity's roots in Judaism, and they were also shaped by the wider culture of the Roman Empire. Both the Old and New Testaments recognize the existence of the institution of slavery.

The earliest surviving Christian teachings about slavery are from Paul the Apostle. Paul did not renounce the institution of slavery, though perhaps this was not for personal reasons (similar to Aristotle). He taught that Christian slaves ought to serve their masters wholeheartedly. Nothing in the passage affirms slavery as a naturally valid or divinely mandated institution. Rather, Paul's discussion about the duties of Christian slaves and the responsibilities of Christian masters transforms the institution, even if it falls short of calling for slavery's outright abolition. In the ancient world the slave was a thing. Aristotle wrote that there could never be friendship between a master and a slave, for a master and a slave have nothing in common: "a slave is a living tool, just as a tool is an inanimate slave." Paul's words are entirely different. He calls the slave a "slave of Christ", one who wants to do "the will of God" and who will receive a "reward" for "whatever good he does". Likewise, the master is responsible to God for how he treats his slave, who is ultimately God's property rather than his own. This is another way of saying that the slave, no less than the master, has been made in God's image. As such, he possesses inestimable worth and great dignity. He is to be treated properly. In such a framework slavery, even though it was still slavery, could never be the same type of institution that was imposed on non-Christians. It was this transformation (which came from viewing all persons as being made in God's image) that ultimately destroyed slavery. Tradition describes Pope Pius I (term c. 158–167) and Pope Callixtus I (term c. 217–222) as former slaves.

Nearly all Christian leaders before the late 15th century recognised the institution of slavery, within specific Biblical limitations, as being consistent with Christian theology. In 1452, Pope Nicholas V instituted the hereditary slavery of captured Muslims and pagans, regarding all non-Christians as "enemies of Christ".

Genesis 9:25–27, the Curse of Ham, says: "Cursed be Canaan! The lowest of slaves will he be to his brothers. He also said, 'Blessed be the Lord, the God of Shem! May Canaan be the slave of Shem." This verse has been used to justify racialized slavery, since "Christians and even some Muslims eventually identified Ham's descendents as black Africans". Anthony Pagden argued that "This reading of the Book of Genesis merged easily into a medieval iconographic tradition in which devils were always depicted as black. Later pseudo-scientific theories would be built around African skull shapes, dental structure, and body postures, in an attempt to find an unassailable argument—rooted in whatever the most persuasive contemporary idiom happened to be: law, theology, genealogy, or natural science—why one part of the human race should live in perpetual indebtedness to another."

Rodney Stark makes the argument in For the Glory of God: How Monotheism Led to Reformations, Science, Witch-Hunts, and the End of Slavery, that Christianity helped to end slavery worldwide, as does Lamin Sanneh in Abolitionists Abroad. These authors point out that Christians who believed that slavery was wrong on the basis of their religious convictions spearheaded abolitionism, and many of the early campaigners for the abolition of slavery were driven by their Christian faith and they were also driven by a desire to realize their view that all people are equal under God.

Modern-day Christians generally condemn slavery as wrong and contrary to God's will. Only peripheral groups such as the Ku Klux Klan and other Christian hate groups which operate on the racist fringes of the Christian Reconstructionist and Christian Identity movements advocate the reinstitution of slavery. Full adherents of Christian Reconstructionism are few and they are marginalized among conservative Christians. With these exceptions, all Christian faith groups now condemn slavery, and they see the practice of slavery as being incompatible with basic Christian principles.

=== Domestic violence ===
Christianity and domestic violence deals with the debate in Christian communities about the recognition and response to domestic violence, which is complicated by a culture of silence and acceptance among abuse victims. There are some Bible verses which abusers use to justify the abuse of their wives. According to the U.S. Conference of Catholic Bishops, abusive men use Ephesians 5:22 as a justification for their abuse, taking out of contexts a passage about the mutual submission of husband and wife.

=== Violence against Jews ===
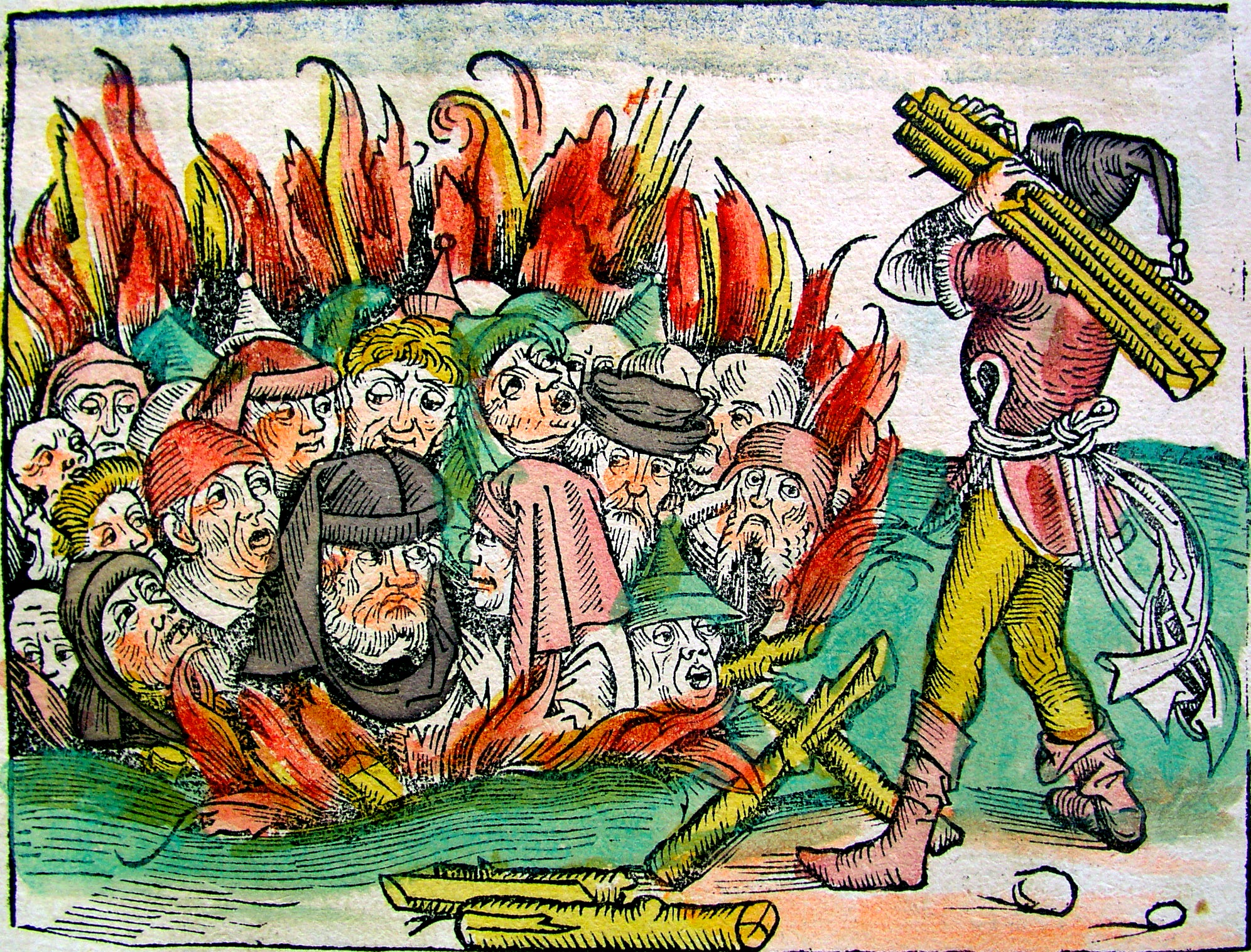
Jews burned alive for the alleged host desecration in Deggendorf, Bavaria, in 1337

A strain of hostility towards Judaism and the Jewish people developed among Christians in the early years of Christianity, persisted over the ensuing centuries, was driven by numerous factors including theological differences, the Christian drive for converts, which is decreed by the Great Commission, a misunderstanding of Jewish beliefs and practices, and the perception that Jews are hostile towards Christians.

Over the centuries, these attitudes were reinforced by Christian preaching, art and popular teaching, all of which expressed contempt for Jews.

Modern antisemitism has primarily been described as hatred against Jews as a race, a form of racism, rather than hatred against Jews as a religious group, because its modern expression is rooted in 18th century racial theories, while anti-Judaism is described as hostility towards the Jewish religion, a sentiment which is rooted in but more extreme than criticism of Judaism as a religion, but in Western Christianity, anti-Judaism was transformed into antisemitism during the 12th century.

=== Christian fascism ===
Christian fascism is a religious and political philosophy that blends Christianity with fascism, endorsing violence, authoritarian rule and the regeneration of society on the basis of the Bible and its teachings. Christian fascists advocate for the establishment of the authority of religion and morals in personal, social, and political life of the people of a nation. A nationalist movement, it asserts the superiority of a specific culture, nation or ethnic group as possessing a status of chosen people. Christian fascism is generally characterized by its support for a dictatorial leadership and the subordination of the individual to the power of the state, seen as the main enforcer of biblical law.

== Christian opposition to violence ==
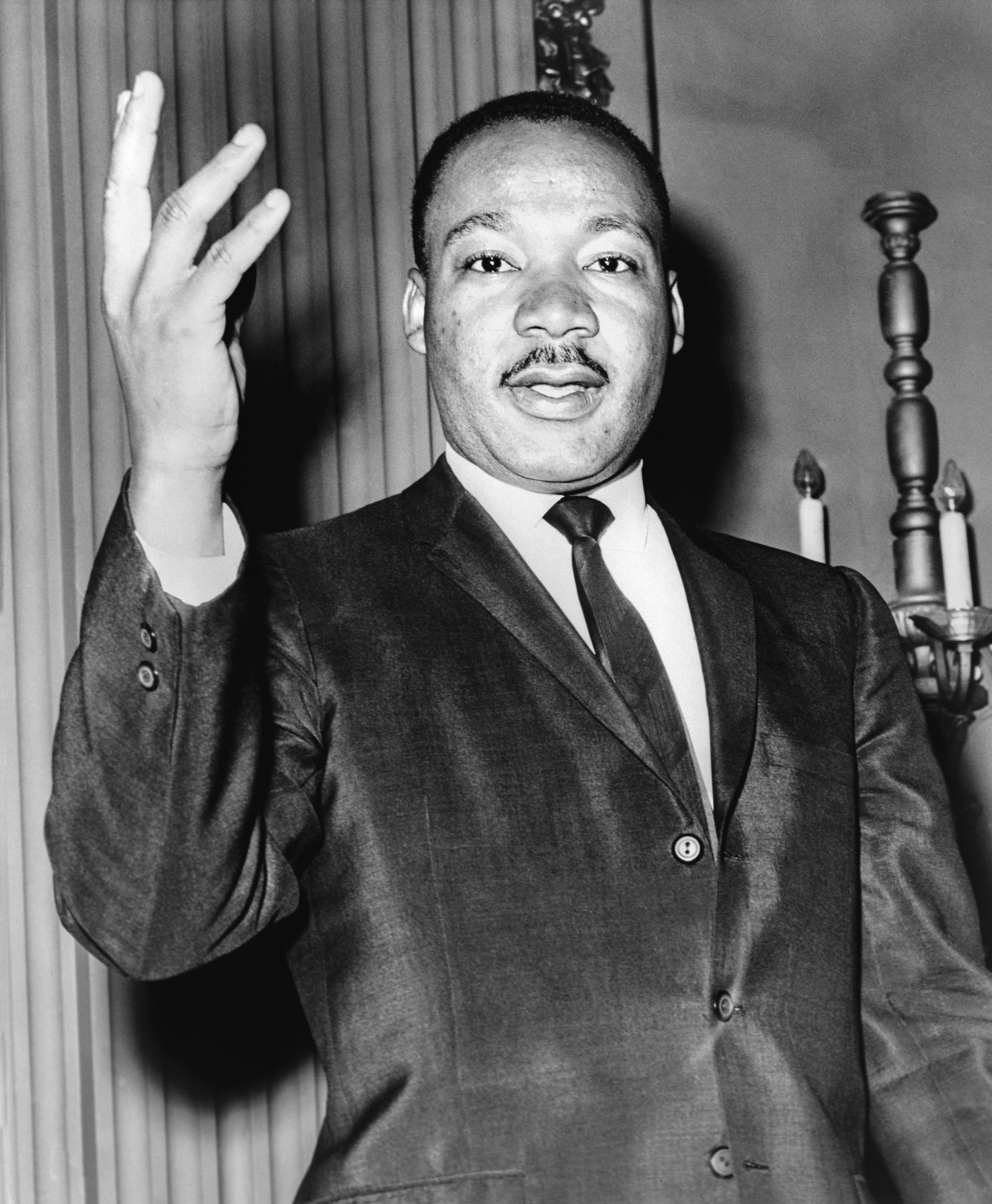
The Rev. Martin Luther King Jr., a prominent advocate of Christian nonviolence

Historian Roland Bainton described the early church as pacifist—a period that ended with the accession of Constantine.

In the first few centuries of Christianity, many Christians refused to engage in military service. In fact, there were a number of famous examples of soldiers who became Christians and refused to engage in combat afterwards. They were subsequently executed for their refusal to fight. The commitment to pacifism and the rejection of military service are attributed by Mark J. Allman, professor in the Department of Religious and Theological Studies at Merrimack College, to two principles: "(1) the use of force (violence) was seen as antithetical to Jesus' teachings and service in the Roman military required worship of the emperor as a god which was a form of idolatry."

In the 3rd century, Origen wrote: "Christians could not slay their enemies." Clement of Alexandria wrote: "Above all, Christians are not allowed to correct with violence the delinquencies of sins." Tertullian argued forcefully against all forms of violence, considering abortion, warfare and judicial death penalties to be forms of murder.

Pacifist and violence-resisting traditions have continued into contemporary times. One of those religious organizations are Jehovah's Witnesses, they are politically neutral and were one of the only religious groups as a whole to object to enlisting in WW2.

Several present-day Christian churches and communities were established specifically with nonviolence, including conscientious objection to military service, as foundations of their beliefs. Members of the Historic Peace Churches such as Quakers, Mennonites, Amish and the Church of the Brethren object to war based on their conviction that Christian life is incompatible with military actions, because Jesus enjoins his followers to love their enemies and refrain from committing acts of violence.

In the 20th century, Martin Luther King Jr. and others adapted the nonviolent ideas of Gandhi to a Baptist theology and politics.

In the 21st century, Christian feminist thinkers have drawn attention to their views by opposing violence against women.

== Secular christian interpretration ==
A number of secular New Testament scholars and historians argue that the New Testament does not teach that all uses of force are always wrong. They point to passages recognizing government authority and distinguishing personal ethics from the state's role. Some important examples are: N. T. Wright – Although a Christian, his scholarship is widely respected academically. He argues that Jesus taught enemy-love for his followers but did not abolish the state's responsibility to maintain justice. He frequently discusses Romans 13, where Paul says governing authorities "do not bear the sword in vain." John Nolland – In his commentary on Matthew, he argues that "turn the other cheek" (Matthew 5:39) addresses personal retaliation, not every use of force. He translates the verse as "you are not to set yourself against one who does evil," emphasizing a prohibition on revenge rather than all resistance. Craig S. Keener – He argues that Jesus' commands in the Sermon on the Mount primarily concern personal conduct and should not automatically be read as abolishing government, policing, or all military action. Richard B. Hays – He leans toward Christian pacifism but acknowledges that the New Testament itself recognizes the existence and role of civil authorities in maintaining order, even if Christians debate what that means

== See also ==
- Criticism of Christianity
- Mormonism and violence
- Sectarian violence among Christians
