= Michele R. Salzman =

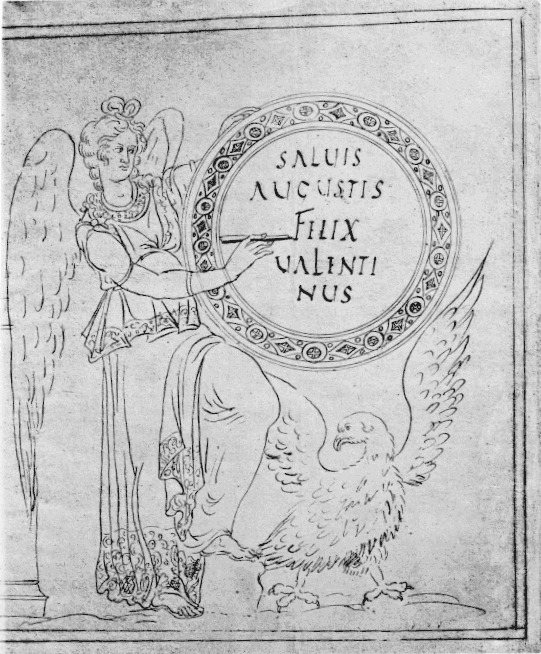
Chronograph of 354, topic of Salzman's doctoral thesis

Michele Renee Salzman (born August 2, 1952) is a distinguished professor of history at the University of California, Riverside. She is an expert on the religious and social history of late antiquity.

== Education ==
Salzman was born in Brooklyn and received her B.A. degree from Brooklyn College in 1973. She was awarded her master's degree in 1975 from Bryn Mawr College in 1975. Salzman received her PhD from Bryn Mawr College in 1981. Her doctoral thesis was entitled Studies on the Calendar of 354.

== Career and research ==
In 1986–1987, Salzman was the Mellon fellow in classical studies at the American Academy in Rome. Salzman taught at Swarthmore College, Columbia University, and Boston University before joining the history faculty at the University of California, Riverside (UCR) in 1995. Salzman was chair of the history department at UCR during 1999–2000, and was promoted to professor in 2000.

Salzman has published widely on Roman and Greek history, late antique religion, culture and society, and Latin literature. Her publications have been described as 'austere and disciplined', and 'meticulous'. Professor Elizabeth A. Clark described Salzman's monograph On Roman Time as 'highly informative, insightful, and provocative'. A research project by Salzman entitled 'The ‘Falls’ of Rome in Late Antiquity' examined the city of Rome and its response to crisis from the third to seventh centuries. The outcome of this project, the monograph The Falls of Rome. Crises, Resilience, and Resurgence in Late Antiquity, was published by Cambridge University Press in 2021. Peter Brown described the book as a 'fresh interpretation' and 'a provocative study'.

Salzman is an associate editor of the academic journal Studies in Late Antiquity.

== Awards and honours ==
In 2008, Salzman was the Lucy Shoe Merritt Scholar in Residence at the American Academy in Rome. In 2017, Salzman was appointed to the Board of Trustees at the American Academy of Rome. Salzman was the Elizabeth and J. Richardson Dilworth Fellow at the Institute of Advanced Study, Princeton University in 2018.

== Personal life ==
Salzman is married to sociologist Steven Brint, also a distinguished professor at University of California, Riverside.

== Bibliography ==
- On Roman Time: The Codex-Calendar of 354 and the Rhythms of Urban Life in Late Antiquity (University of California Press, 1990)
- (edited with Claudia Rapp) Elites in Late Antiquity (Baltimore: Johns Hopkins University Press, 2000)
- The Making of a Christian Aristocracy: Social and Religious Change in the Western Roman Empire (Cambridge: Harvard University Press, 2002)
- (translated and edited with Michael Roberts) The Letters of Symmachus. Book 1 (Atlanta: Society of Biblical Literature, 2011)
- (editor) The Cambridge History of Religions in the Ancient World (Cambridge: Cambridge University Press, 2013)
- Michele Renee Salzman, Marianne Sághy, Rita Lizzi Testa (ed.), Pagans and Christians in Late Antique Rome: Conflict, Competition, and Coexistence in the Fourth Century (New York: Cambridge University Press, 2015)
- The Falls of Rome. Crises, Resilience, and Resurgence in Late Antiquity (Cambridge: Cambridge University Press, 2021)
