= Rita Lizzi Testa =

Italian late antique historian

Rita Lizzi Testa, also known as Rita Lizzi, is an Italian historian of late antiquity, specialising in Christianity and paganism in the fourth to sixth centuries CE. She is a Professor of Roman history at the University of Perugia.

== Early life and education ==
Lizzi Testa was born in Terni, Umbria, on 17 August 1956. She was awarded a degree in Literature at the University of Florence, and completed her doctorate with a dissertation on De Regno by Synesius of Cyrene.

== Career ==
Lizzi Testa lectured in Roman History at the University of Turin before taking up her current position at the University of Perugia. She serves as a member of the Class of Ambrosian Studies at the Accademia Ambrosiana, and is a member of the advisory board for CUA Studies in Early Christianity and Christianity in Late Antiquity. During her career, she has worked on five national projects studying the development of ancient institutions in late antiquity.

In 2023, Lizzi Testa was elected to the Accademia dei Lincei.

== Selected bibliography ==
=== Books ===
- (1987) Il potere episcopale nell'Oriente Romano. Rappresentazione ideologica e realtà politica (IV-V secolo d.C.). Roma: Edizioni dell'Ateneo.
- (1989) Vescovi e strutture ecclesiastiche nella città tardoantica (L'Italia Annonaria nel IV-V secolo d.C.). Como: New Press. ISBN 978-8898238194.
- (2004) Senatori, popolo, papi. Il governo di Roma al tempo dei Valentiniani. Bari: Edipuglia. ISBN 978-8872283929.
- (2022) Christian Emperors and Roman Elites in Late Antiquity. New York/London: Routledge. ISBN 9781472440846.
- (2024) Un Occidente rivolto a Est. Dalla fine della dinastia teodosiana alla rovina dell'Italia romana. Rome: L'Erma di Bretschneider. ISBN 9788891331779.

=== Edited volumes ===
- (2006) Le trasformazioni delle élites in età tardoantica. Atti del Convegno Internazionale (Perugia, 15-16 marzo 2004). Roma: L'Erma di Bretschneider. ISBN 9788882653729.
- (ed. with Giorgio Bonamente and Noel Lenski) (2012) Costantino prima e dopo Costantino. Constantine before and after Constantine. Bari: Edipuglia. ISBN 978-88-7228-677-7.
- (2014) The Strange Death of Pagan Rome. Reflections on a Historiographical Controversy. Turnhout: Brepols. ISBN 978-2-503-54942-2, 978-2-503-57153-9.
- (ed. with Michele R. Salzman and Marianne Sághy) (2016) Pagans and Christians in Late Antique Rome. Conflict, Competition, and Coexistence in the Fourth Century. Cambridge: Cambridge University Press. ISBN 9781316274989, 978-1107110304.
- (2017) Late Antiquity in Contemporary Debate. Newcastle upon Tyne: Cambridge Scholars Publishing. ISBN 978-1-443-84308-9.
- (ed. with Giovanni Alberto Cecconi and Arnaldo Marcone) (2020) The Past as Present. Essays on Roman History in Honour of Guido Clemente. Turnhout: Brepols. ISBN 978-2-503-58524-6, 978-2-503-58525-3.
