= Marianne Sághy =

Hungarian expert on the religious and social culture of Late Antiquity

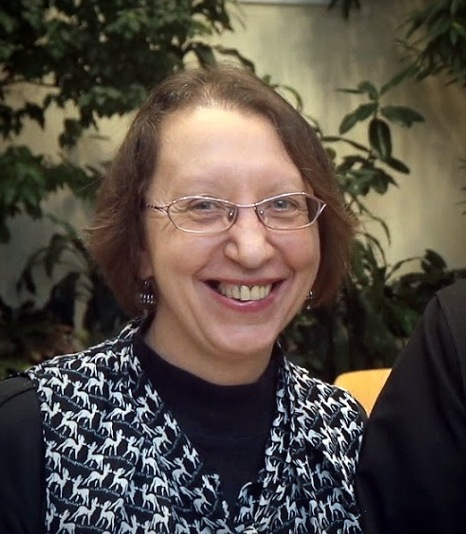
- Born: 1961; Hungary
- Died: 2018 (aged 56–57)

Academic background
- Education: Princeton University, 1998
- Thesis: Patrons and Priests: The Roman Senatorial Aristocracy and the Church, AD 355-384

Academic work
- Discipline: History
- Sub-discipline: Late Antiquity
- Institutions: Central European University; Hungarian Cultural Institute; University of Oxford

Marianne Sághy (1961–2018) was a Hungarian expert on the religious and social culture of Late Antiquity, with an especial focus on the cult of saints and hagiography. She was associate professor at the Department of Medieval Studies, Central European University, and at the Department of Medieval and Early Modern Universal History, Eötvös Loránd University, Budapest.

== Biography ==
=== Early life and education ===
Sághy was born in 1961. She attended the Szilágyi Erzsébet Secondary School, Budapest. She graduated from Eötvös Loránd University in 1985 with a degree in History and French. She received a French government scholarship (1984–85) to study at the Centre d'Études Supérieures de Civilisation Médiévale, Université de Poitiers. Her Master's thesis was entitled Pierre Dubois' Plan for the Recovery of the Holy Land in 1306. Between 1986 and 1987 she was a visiting scholar at the University of Oxford, receiving a stipend from the Soros Foundation. In 1989 she began her PhD at the University of Princeton. Her supervisors were Natalie Zemon Davis and Peter Brown. She was awarded her PhD in 1998 for a thesis entitled Patrons and Priests: The Roman Senatorial Aristocracy and the Church, AD 355-384.

=== Career ===
In 1993 she was a founding member of the Department of Medieval Studies at Central European University, where she was employed as a lecturer. From 1999 to 2003 she was the Academic Director of the Hungarian Cultural Institute, Paris, where she sought to promote French-Hungarian scientific and cultural relations. Sághy held the position of President of the Hungarian Hagiography Society. She sat on the editorial boards of such academic journals as the Annual of the Department of Medieval Studies and the Hungarian Historical Review.

Sághy has been described as 'a well-versed and fruitful author, a translator of important works and a writer of serious scholarship'. Her contribution to scholarship on late antique and medieval religion and hagiography through teaching, organising and presenting at international conferences, authoring and editing books and source editions, and publishing around 60 individual scholarly studies, was 'internationally recognised'.

=== Death ===
Sághy died on 21 September 2018 at the age of fifty-seven. Her last book, Saint Martin, Soldier of Christ, was published only a few weeks before her death. A Colloquium in her honour will be held at the Central European University in June 2019, entitled 'Dis/embodiment and Im/materiality: Uncovering the Body, Gender and Sexuality in Philosophies of Late Antiquity – In Memoriam Marianne Sagh (1961–2018). Speakers include Professor Susanna Elm. The Hungarian Institute of Paris honores her in November 2019 with a presentation of a book published a few weeks after her death: an edition, French translation and presentation of the works of Pierre Dubois, De la reconquête de la Terre Sainte – De l'abrègement des guerres et procès du royaume des Francs, intro, éd. et trad. M. SAGHY, A. LEONAS et P.-A. FORCADET, Les Belles Lettres, Paris, 2019.

== Publications ==
=== Monographs and edited volumes ===
- (ed.) Women and Power in East Central Europe: Medieval and Modern (Idyllywild: Charles Schlacks, 1993)
- Women and Power in East Central Europe: Medieval and Modern (Los Angeles: Ch. Schlacks, Centre for Multietnic and Transnational Studies, University of Southern California, 1996)
- Versek és vértanúk: a római mártírkultusz Damasus pápa korában, 366-384 [Poems and martyrs: The Roman cult of martyrs at the time of Pope Damasus] (Budapest: Hungarus Paulus, 2003)
- Isten barátai: Szent és szentéletrajz a késő antikvitásban [Friends of God: Saints and hagiography in the Late Antiquity] (Budapest : Kairosz, 2005)
- Fifteen Years of Medieval Studies in Central Europe (Budapest: Central European University, 2009)
- (ed. with Michele Renee Salzman and Rita Lizzi Testa) Pagans and Christians in Late Antique Rome: Conflict, Competition, and Coexistence in the Fourth Century (Cambridge: Cambridge University Press, 2016)
- (ed. with Edward M. Schoolman) Pagans and Christians in the Late Roman Empire: New Evidence, New Approaches (4th-8th centuries) (Budapest: Central European University, 2018)
- Szent Márton, Krisztus katonája [Saint Martin, soldier of Christ] (Szombathely: Szülőföld Kiadó, 2018)
- Pierre Dubois, De la reconquête de la Terre Sainte – De l'abrègement des guerres et procès du royaume des Francs, intro, éd. et trad. M. SAGHY, A. LEONAS et P.-A. FORCADET, Les Belles Lettres, Paris, 2019.

=== Translations ===
Translated from English to Hungarian:

- Peter Brown, The Cult of the Saints; Augustine of Hippo: A Biography
- Robert Markus, Saint Gregory the Great and his Age
- Pierre Riché, Éducation et culture dans l’Occident barbare

Translated from Latin to French

- Pierre Dubois, De la reconquête de la Terre Sainte – De l'abrègement des guerres et procès du royaume des Francs, intro, éd. et trad. M. SAGHY, A. LEONAS et P.-A. FORCADET, Les Belles Lettres, Paris, 2019.

=== Articles and book chapters ===
- 'Aspects of Female Rulership in Late Medieval Literature: the Queens' Reign in Angevin Hungary', East Central Europe, vol. 20, issue 1 (1993) 69–86
- 'Scinditur in partes populus: Pope Damasus and the Martyrs of Rome', Early Medieval Europe, vol. 9 no. 3 (2000) 273–87
- 'Pope Damasus and the Beginnings of Roman Hagiography', Promoting the Saints: Cults and their Contexts from Late Antiquity until the Early Modern Period: Essays in Honor of Gábor Klaniczay for His 60th Birthday, edited by Ottó Gecser, Jozsef Laszlovsky, Marcell Sebok, Katalin Szende, and Balazs Nagy (Budapest : Central European University Press, 2011) 1–17
- 'Veste Regia Indutus: Representations of the Emperor in the Vita Martini', IKON, vol. 5 (2012) 47–55
- 'Hungarians in Hell. The Visions of Laurentius de Tar', IKON (2013) 29–37
- 'Strangers to Patrons: Bishop Damasus and the Foreign Martyrs of Rome', The Hungarian Historical Review, vol. 5 no. 3 (2016) 465-86
