= Steven G. Brint =

American Sociologist

Steven G. Brint (born 1951) is an American sociologist known for his historical and the comparative analyses of schooling; for his studies of professions, professionalism, and “the new class”; and for his contributions to sociological theory. In recent years, he has been engaged in efforts to reform U.S. higher education.

He has held teaching and research positions at Boston College, New York University, Yale University, and is currently a Distinguished Professor of Sociology and Public Policy at the University of California, Riverside.

He is the author of over 100 peer-reviewed articles and books, with over 13,500 citations. His work has been published in many of the top journals in the American Journal of Sociology, Sociological Theory, and Sociology of Education. Brint is married to historian Michele Renee Salzman.

== Background and education ==
Brint was born in Albuquerque, New Mexico in a secular Jewish family. His father was an early computer systems analyst at Sandia Laboratories and his mother acted in the local theatre. Brint received his B.A. in sociology from the University of California at Berkeley in 1973 and his M.A. and Ph.D., both in sociology, from Harvard University. As an undergraduate, he worked at the Center for Studies in Higher Education, where he remains an associated faculty member today. While at Harvard, he wrote a dissertation on "new-class" theory under the supervision of Daniel Bell and James A. Davis.

== Awards and honors ==
- Elected Fellow, American Association for the Advancement of Science
- Elected Fellow, Sociological Research Association
- Willard Waller Award for Best Article in the Sociology of Education (for "Socialization Messages in Primary Schools: An Organizational Analysis")
- Emory Elliot Book Award
- Pierre Bourdieu Book Award (honorable mention), American Sociological Association
- Forbes Top 10 Book in Higher Education
- 1991 Outstanding Book Award. American Educational Research Association
- 1991 Senior Scholar Outstanding Book Award. Council of Universities and Colleges
- Advisory Board, Foundation for Individual Rights and Expression (FIRE)
- Member, Academic Freedom Alliance

== Books ==
- The Diverted Dream: Community Colleges and the Promise of Educational Opportunity in America. with Jerome Karabel New York: Oxford University Press, 1989.
  - American Educational Research Association Outstanding Book Award
  - Senior Scholar Outstanding Book Award, Council on Colleges & Universities
- In an Age of Experts: The Changing Role of Professionals in Politics and Public Life. Princeton: Princeton University Press, 1994.
- The Future of the City of Intellect. Stanford: Stanford University Press. 2002
- Evangelicals and Democracy in America. with Jean Reith Schroedel, vols 1 and 2. New York: Russell Sage Foundation Press. 2009
- Schools and Societies, 3rd ed. Stanford: Stanford University Press, 2016.
- Two Cheers for Higher Education: Why American Universities Are Stronger than Ever – and How to Meet the Challenges They Face. Princeton: Princeton University Press, 2018
