= Mino Celsi =

Italian ambassador and scholar

Mino Cèlsi (1514 – c. 1576) was an Italian ambassador and scholar; he was forced to flee to Basel, Switzerland, for his defense of Protestant critics of Roman Catholicism.

Born in Siena to an aristocratic family, he served in various roles in government, including as ambassador from the Republic to Milan (1545, 1555–1556) and as a representative (1563) of Siena in Florence. Suffering from financial difficulties, and in part because of his affiliation with others who fell to imprisonment by the Roman Inquisition, he fled from Siena and ended up in Basel. He traveled to Vienna and Frankfort in search of employment. After his death a manuscript was published in Latin under his name, including De haereticis coercendis quatenus progredi liceat, disputatio, by Mini Celsi Senensis, and Lelio Sozzini, Christalingae, (1577). (Translation: Highlighting the Progress in the Restrictions of Heresy). The work argues for tolerance of alternative religious beliefs.
