= John Gager =

American religious academic (born 1937)

John Goodrich Gager Jr. (born 1937 in Boston, Massachusetts) is an American scholar of Christianity. He retired from his position as William H. Danforth Professor of Religion at Princeton University in the spring of 2006.

== Biography ==
Gager joined the faculty of Princeton University in 1968 as an assistant professor in the Department of Religion, having previously taught at Haverford College. After studying at Phillips Exeter Academy in New Hampshire, Gager went on to receive his B.A. and M. Div. from Yale University and his Ph.D. from Harvard University. Gager undertook additional studies at the Sorbonne in Paris and at the University of Tübingen in Germany. During his studies in Yale, Gager was a Freedom Rider, and was arrested in Jackson, Mississippi in June 1961.

Gager's scholarly concern is with the religions of the Roman Empire, especially early Christianity and its relations to ancient Judaism, and has also written on the theme of religion and magic.

In his book "Kingdom and Community: The Social World of Early Christianity" (1975), Gager helped pioneer an interdisciplinary approach to the study of religion, drawing particularly on the works of sociologists Peter L. Berger and Thomas Luckmann.

In "Reinventing Paul" (2002), Gager argued for a radical new understanding of the apostle Paul's views of Jews and Judaism. From Library Journal on "Reinventing Paul:"

Gager (religion, Princeton) has written an articulate and well-documented presentation of a controversial but increasingly popular point of view in Pauline studies. Traditionally, biblical scholars have held that Paul taught that the Church replaced the Jews as those now in covenant with God and that Paul thought the Law was no longer binding. Gager sees this as a complete misunderstanding that can be cleared up if we recognize that Paul's teachings on these issues were meant for Gentiles only. The essence of Gager's view is that since Gentiles are Paul's intended audience, it should be clear that rather than rejecting Judaism, Paul is rejecting "anti-Pauline apostles within the Jesus-movement." After he lays out the issues in question and summarizes traditional views of Paul, Gager then makes his argument and discusses various like-minded contemporary scholars, such as E.P. Sanders. He then shows how passages in the New Testament books of Galatians and Romans can be interpreted very differently when his Gentile audience is kept in mind. This informed and revolutionary view of Paul's thought will become one of the central books of modern scholarship on this subject.

Gager's work on curse tablets or defixiones in his book Curse Tablets and Binding Spells from the Ancient World is some of the best in this field.

== Major books ==
- Reinventing Paul (2002), 208 p., ISBN 0-19-515085-6
- The Origins of Anti-Semitism : Attitudes toward Judaism in Pagan and Christian Antiquity (1985), 312 p., ISBN 0-19-503607-7
- Moses in Greco-roman Paganism (1972), 176 p., ISBN 1-58983-216-7
- Curse Tablets and Binding Spells from the Ancient World. (1992), 278 p., ISBN 0-19-506226-4
