= Di Cocco =

Di Cocco (also di Cocco and DiCocco) is a surname. Notable people with the name include:

- Caroline Di Cocco, Italian-Canadian politician
- Francesco Di Cocco (1900–1989), Italian painter
- Giampaolo di Cocco (born 1947), Italian artist, architect and writer
- Paul DiCocco Sr. (1924–1989), American mobster associate

== See also ==
- DiCicco, a list of people with a similar surname
