= Giampaolo di Cocco =

Italian artist

Giampaolo di Cocco (born September 6, 1947, in Florence) is an Italian artist, architect and writer. He experiments on the interaction between the arts and architecture, placing permanent installation in public places across Europe: Marsiglia, Gibellina, Duisburg, Colonia, Skagen (DK), Follonica, Berlino, Seggiano, Firenze, and others.

In the 1976-1987 period, he starts the first installations with the series of works on the theme Grandi Naufragi (Large Shipwrecks). The Grandi Naufragi VII exposition was held at the Breda Works in Pistoia, Italy, and Omar Calabrese contributed to the writing of the catalogue. Calabrese also contributed to the writing of the catalogue for the 1994 exhibition of a series of Grandi Naufragi at the Institut Francais in Florence.

In his 2001 book Il galateo dell' artista principiante, he advises beginners artists how to overcome the traps of the art critics that are enslaved to the art market. The book got a preface by Giuseppe Pontiggia, which was reviewed as "subtle and caustic".

In 2007, he published Alle origini del Carnevale: Mysteria isiaci e miti cattolici (Florence: Pontecorboli), in which he explores the historical origins of the carnival and the mystification performed on it by the Catholic Church. The book includes a note from Giuseppe Pontiggia.

== See also ==
- Temple of Isis (Pompeii) and Navigium Isidis
- Arts & Architecture magazine
