= DiCicco =

DiCicco (also Di Cicco and Dicicco) is a surname. Notable people with the name include:

- Bobby Di Cicco, Italian-American actor
- Dennis di Cicco (born 1950), American astronomer and discoverer of minor planets
- Domenick DiCicco (1963–2024), American politician from New Jersey
- Frank DiCicco (born c. 1946), American politician on the Philadelphia City Council
- Jessica DiCicco (born 1980), American voice, film and television actress
- Pat DiCicco (1909–1978), American agent, movie producer, and actor
- Pier Giorgio Di Cicco (1949–2019), Italian-Canadian poet
- Sue DiCicco (born 1959), American sculptor, children's book author and illustrator
- Tony DiCicco (1948–2017), American soccer player, coach, and commentator

== See also ==
- 3841 Dicicco, named after Dennis di Cicco
- De Cicco v. Schweizer, 1917 American court case concerning privity of contract and consideration
- DeCicco Building, historic building in Portland, Oregon
- De Cecco, Italian pasta company
  - De Cecco (surname)
- Di Cocco, a list of people with the surname DiCocco and similar
