= Foreign influences on Pompeii =

Pompeii
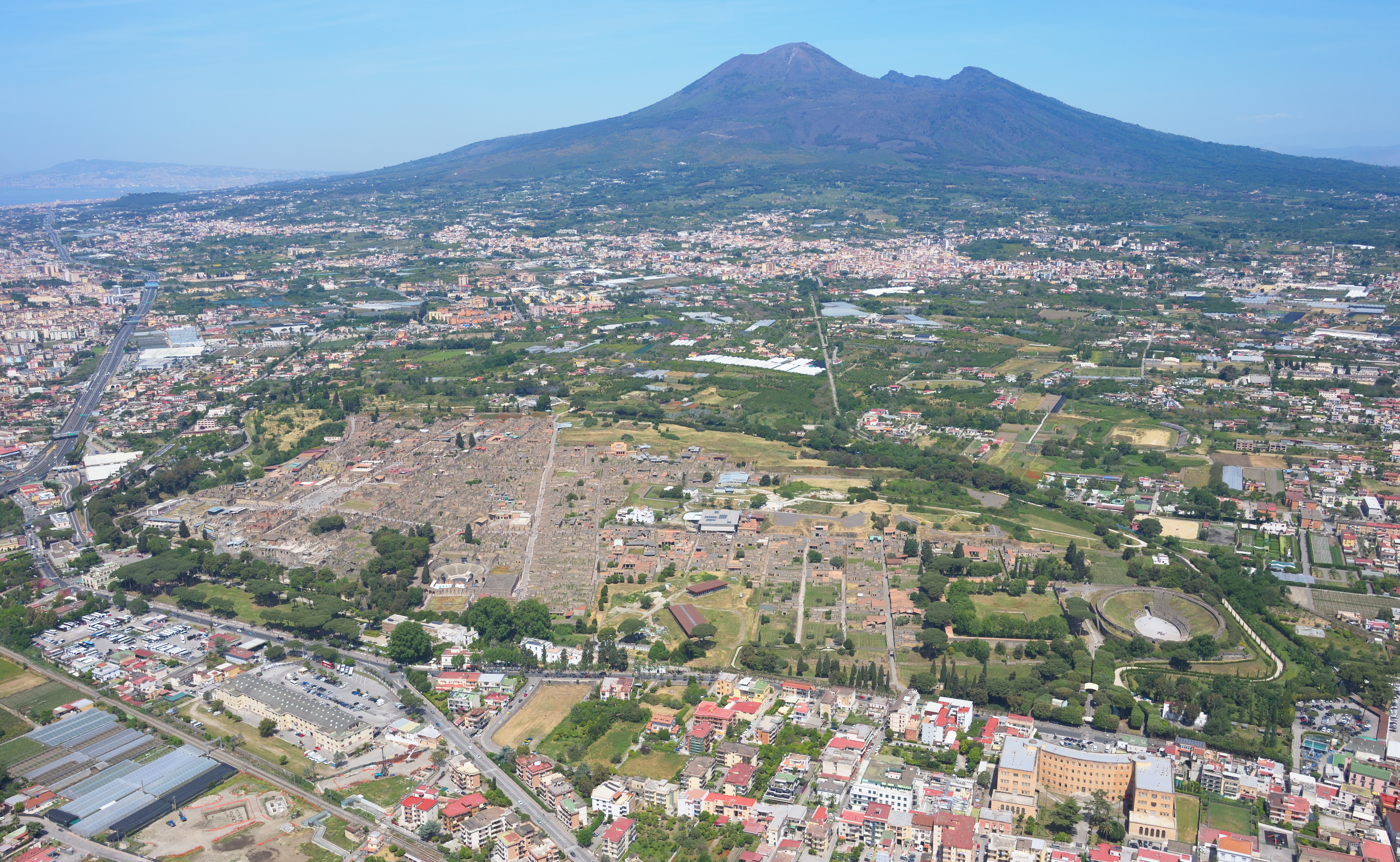
- Aerial view of Pompeii

- Location within Italy
- 40°45′0″N 14°29′10″E
- Type: Settlement
- Location: Pompei, Province of Naples, Campania, Italy

History
- Built: 6th–7th century BC
- Abandoned: AD 79

Site notes
- Area: 64 to 67 ha (160 to 170 acres)
- Website: www.pompeiisites.org

UNESCO World Heritage Site
- Official name: Archaeological Areas of Pompeii, Herculaneum, and Torre Annunziata
- Type: Cultural
- Criteria: iii, iv, v
- Designated: 1997 (21st session)
- Reference no.: 829
- Region: Europe

Several non-native societies had an influence on Ancient Pompeian culture. Historians’ interpretation of artefacts, preserved by the Eruption of Mount Vesuvius in 79, identify that such foreign influences came largely from Greek and Hellenistic cultures of the Eastern Mediterranean, including Egypt. Greek influences were transmitted to Pompeii via the Greek colonies in Magna Graecia (Southern Italy), which were formed in the 8th century BC. Hellenistic influences originated from Roman commerce, and later conquest of Egypt from the 2nd century BC.

Specifically, these cultures contributed to the development of Pompeii’s art, architecture and religious spheres. For instance, Greek influences can be identified in the Alexander Mosaic, horse-shoe shaped theatres and Pompeii’s adoption of the Greek pantheon of gods. Examples of Egyptian influences can be found in the Nile Mosaic, garden art in the Villa of Julia Felix and the Cult of Isis.

== Origin of Greek influences ==
The origins of Greek influences on Pompeii stems from an ancient region known by the Romans as ‘Magna Graecia’: a term used to label the cities of southern Italy established by the Greeks in the eighth century BC. The Greeks were attracted to this area due to the fertile land it offered and the advantageous trading position it controlled. As the settlement flourished, Greek influence was transmitted to Pompeii and the wider Roman world through these colonies. Rooted in this early link, Rome developed a deep and enduring fascination for Greek culture as they integrated its art, architecture and religion into their own society. The popularity of Hellenic culture grew following the Roman capture of Syracuse (212 BC) and sack of Corinth (146 BC) where plundered Greek art and architecture were brought back to Rome.

== Greek influences on Pompeii ==
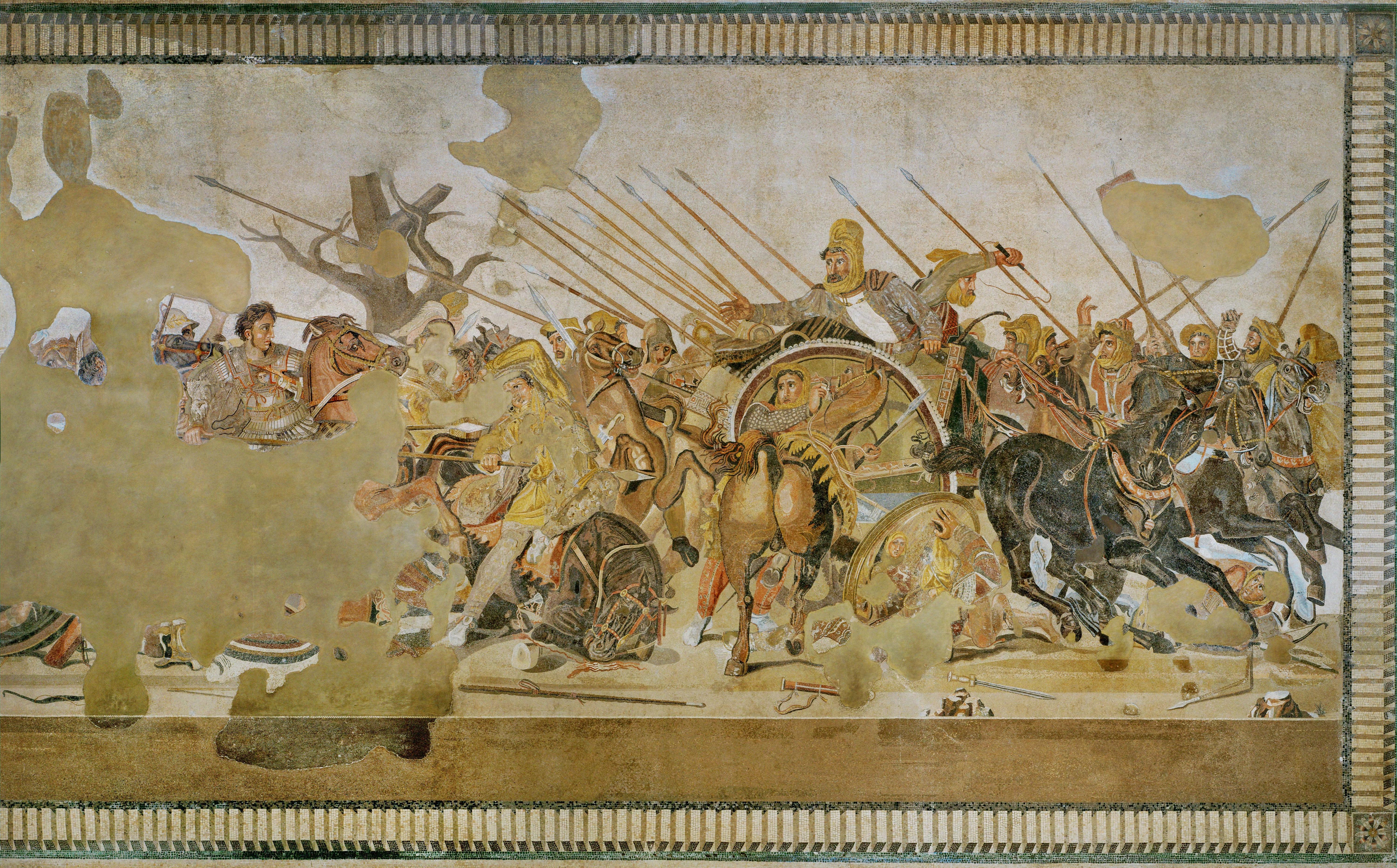
The Alexander Mosaic, House of the Faun

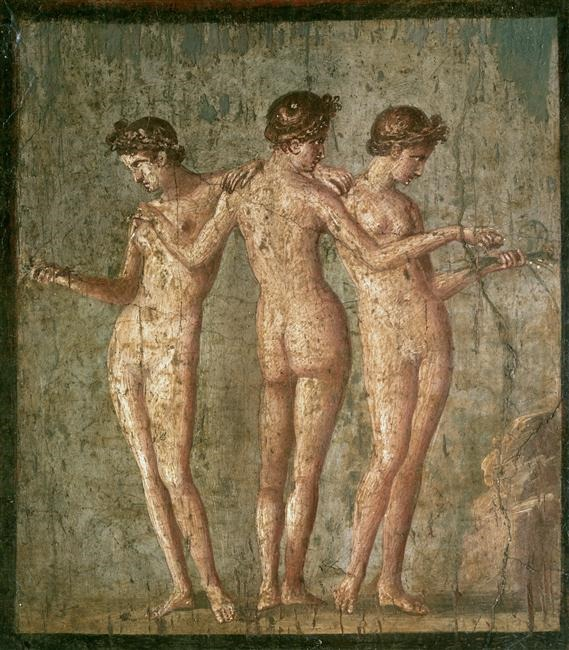
The Three Graces mosaic, House of Titus Dentatus Panthera

=== Art ===
==== The Alexander Mosaic ====
The Alexander mosaic, unearthed during an 1831 excavation of the House of the Faun, depicts a battle between Alexander the Great and Darius III of Persia alongside their respective armies. This mosaic is believed to be a copy of a famous Greek painting by Philoxenos of Eretria dated c. 300 BC. It mirrors the elements of traditional Hellenistic art by both emphasising visual effects and drawing to attention the emotional reaction of the fighters.

==== The Three Graces Fresco ====
Discovered in the House of Titus Dentatus Panthera (on south wall of tablinum), the Three Graces fresco depicts the Graces dancing naked in a circle while holding sprigs of myrtle and wearing wreaths. The Graces (also known as the Charities) were minor goddesses of Greek mythology.

==== Doryphoros ====
Numerous Roman copies of Doryphoros (‘Spear-Bearer’) have been found around Campania including one in Pompeii. This statue, dated 120–50 BC and made from Carrara marble, is an imitation of the bronze Greek original by the famed sculptor Polykleitos.

=== Architecture ===
==== Basilica ====
Pompeii’s Basilica (built between 120 BC and 78 BC) was constructed in the Hellenistic style. The building featured two levels of Greek Corinthian and Ionic columns rather than Roman arches to support the roof. An ancient Greek stoa; a freestanding colonnade which created public spaces.

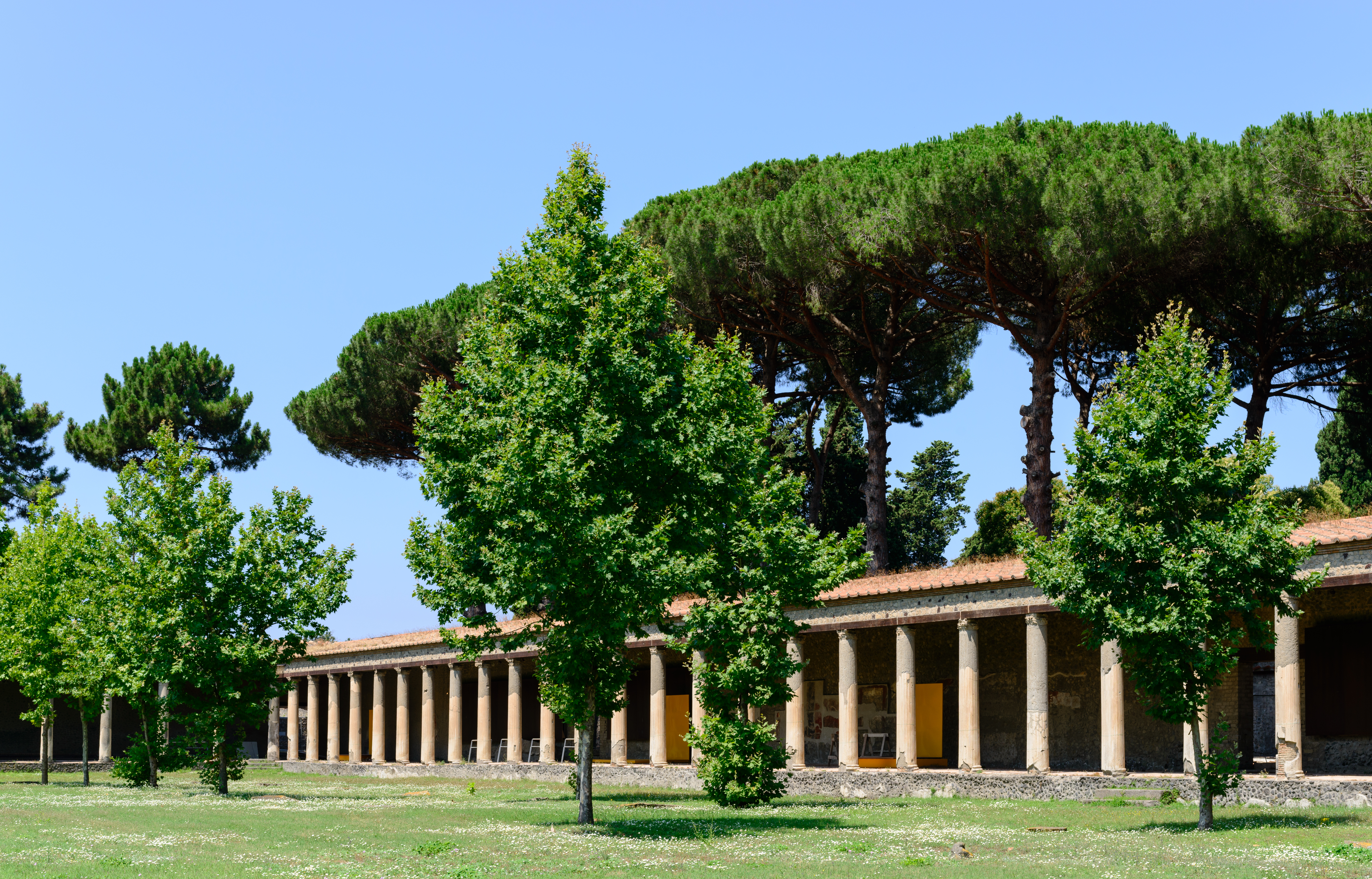
Large Palaestra, Pompeii

==== Palaestra ====
The Large Palaestra of Pompeii, located in the eastern periphery of the city, adopts Greek architectural elements with its large, open colonnaded spaces. This Roman practice of constructing palaestras originates from the ancient Greek gymnasium, a complex similarly built for training and exercise.

==== Streetscapes ====
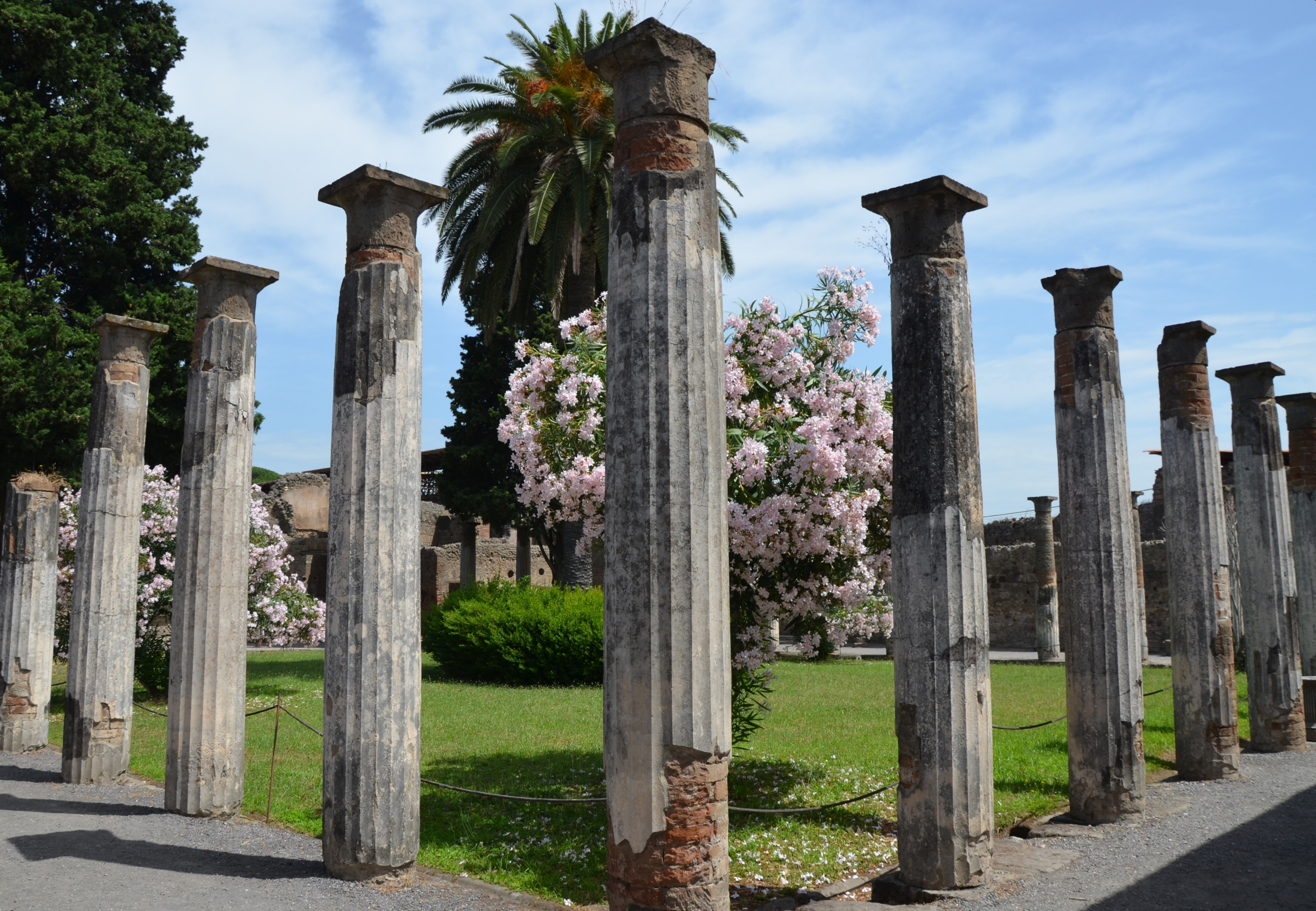
Peristyle at the House of the Faun

The streetscape of Pompeii, with its use of insulae to divide the roads of the town into blocks.

==== Peristyle ====
The peristyle, based on Greek design, featured in several of Pompeii’s private buildings and villas. A peristyle was a colonnade or covered walkway around a courtyard which enclosed a garden. The House of The Faun depicts this architectural feature containing two peristyles: one built in the early 2nd century BC and the other in the late 2nd century BC.

=== Religion ===
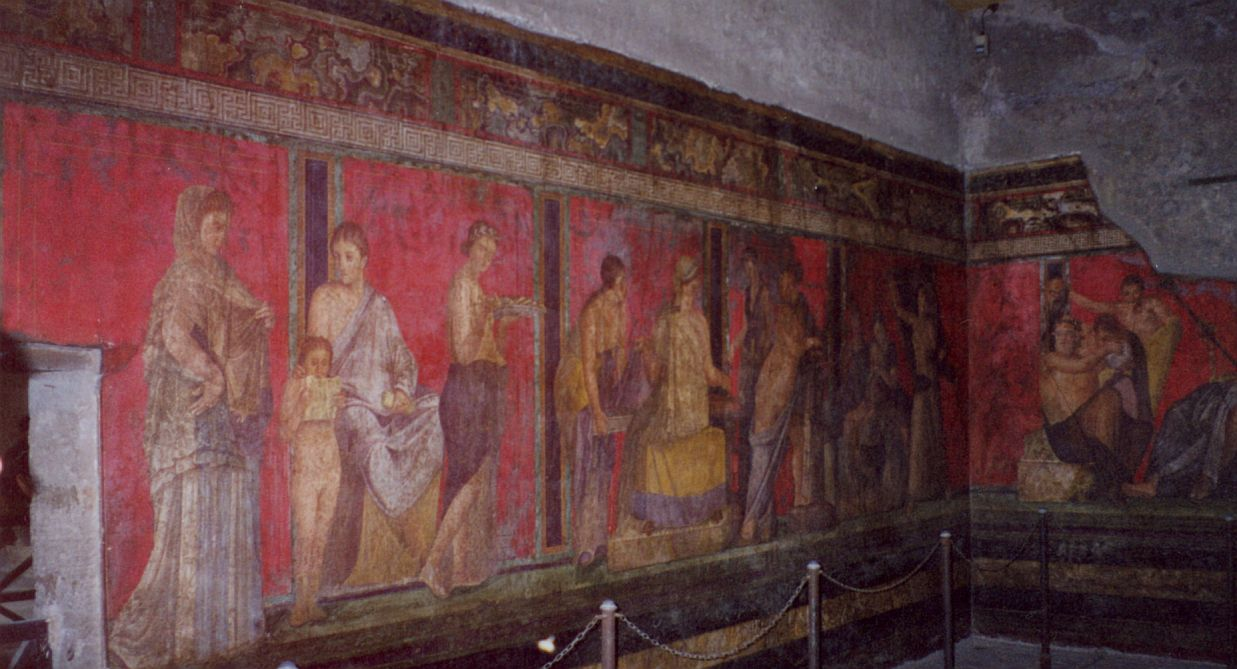
Villa of Mysteries Fresco, Pompeii

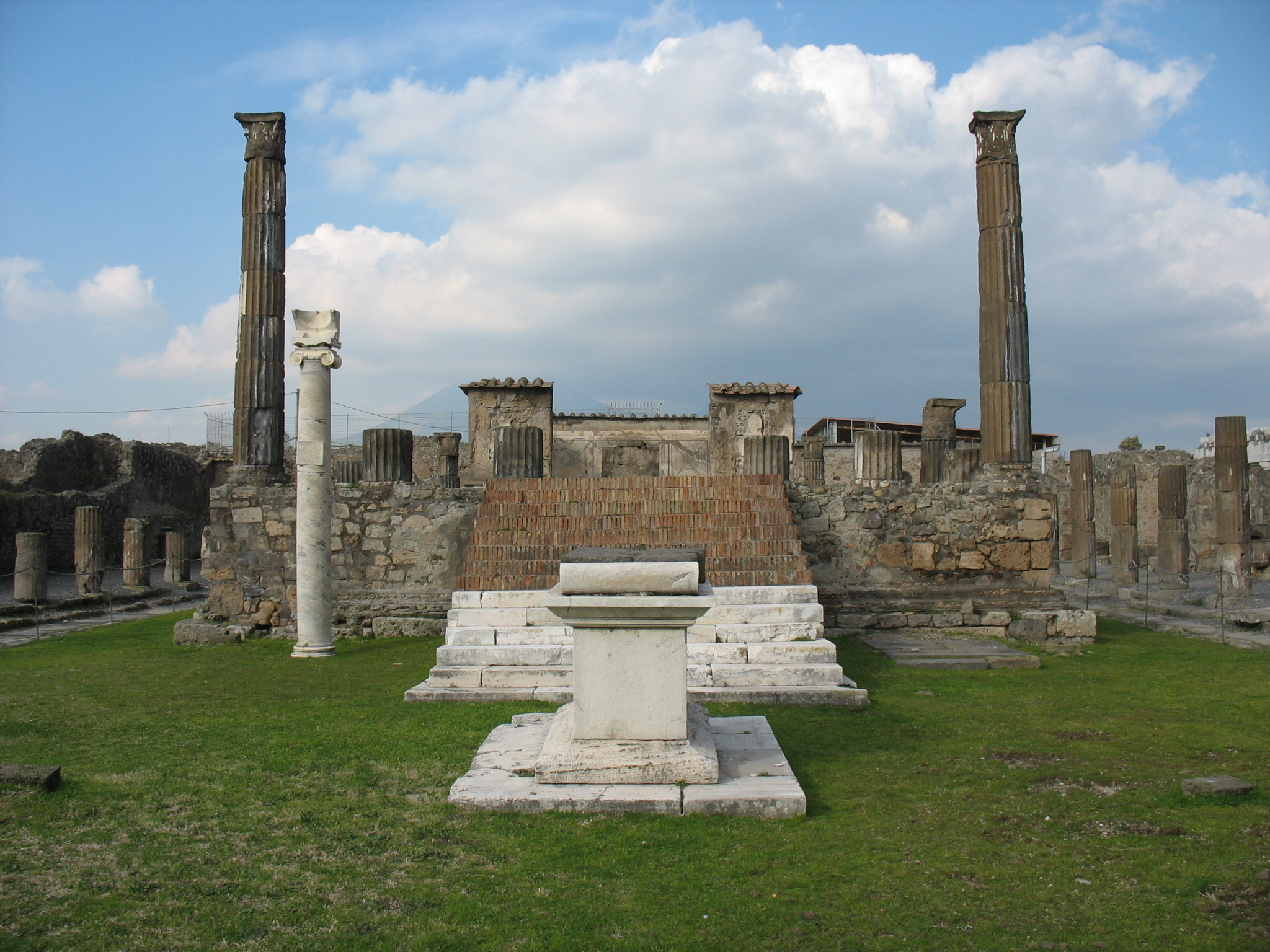
Temple of Apollo, Pompeii

==== The Cult of Dionysus ====
Dionysus, the god of fertility and wine was worshipped by the Greeks. Romans called this god Bacchus. Associated with this cult was the ‘bacchanalia’, a Latin term for the rites or festivals of Bacchus which according to Livy involved cult members participating in aggressive sexual promiscuity and alcohol-fuelled violence. In 186 BC the Roman senate, fearing that the unbridled nature of the festivals was a threat to public and political stability, outlawed the cult. Despite this, its practice still remained popular in Campania and evidence suggests Pompeii as well. For instance, The Villa of Mysteries displays a series of frescoes which many historians believe to depict a woman’s initiation into the cult of Dionysus.

The Cult of Apollo

Worship of Apollo, the Greek god of poetry, music, dance, archery and prophecy, was also incorporated into Pompeian religion. Pompeii’s forum contained a Temple dedicated to this god built in the 2nd century BC. The temple was surrounded by Corinthian columns, featured a travertine stone altar and was decorated by statues of Apollo alongside other deities.

==== Worship of Hercules ====
The Romans adapted the Greek god Heracles and incorporated him into their own religion under the new Roman name Hercules. This hero was regarded as the son of Jupiter (the Roman equivalent of Zeus) and was renowned for his superhuman strength and fantastic adventures. The House of the Garden of Hercules, located to the west of Pompeii’s Palestra, illustrates the influence of this Grecian god. Specifically, the garden of this building contained a large lararium where a marble statuette of Hercules, an altar and aedicula were dedicated to him. The House of the Vettii provides further evidence. Within its reception room, on the left hand wall, an infant Hercules is depicted strangling a serpent. This fresco, painted in Fourth Style, recalls the mythological story of when Hera, enraged by Zeus’ affair with Alcmene, sent snakes to kill their child Hercules.

=== Drama ===
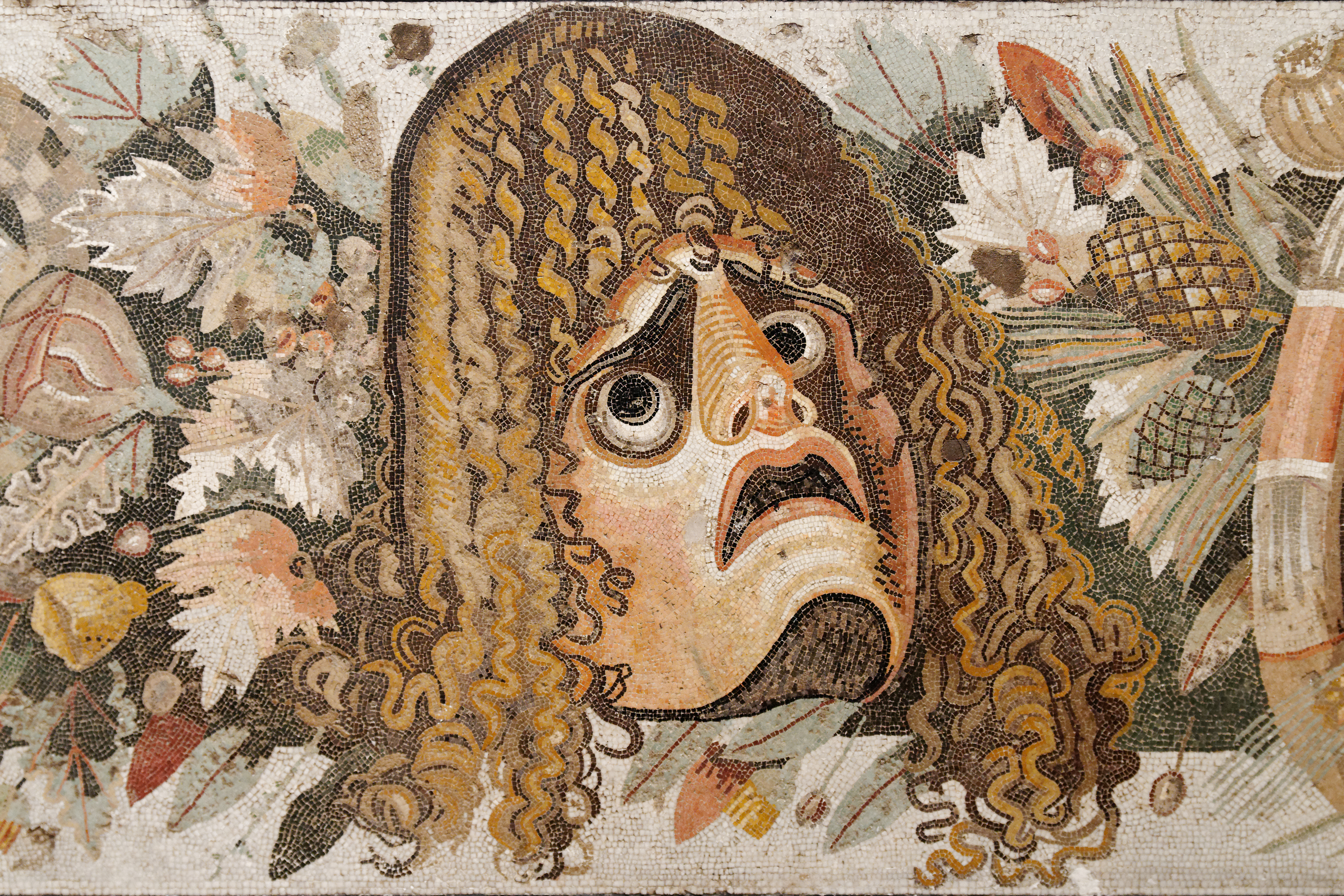
Theatre mask mosaic, House of the Faun

Ancient Greek theatre, originally developed in Athens during the 6th century BC, Greek tragedy plays. Its popularity expanded into the Mediterranean where it was embraced by other Hellenistic cultures and Rome. This influence of Greek drama on Pompeii is portrayed in The House of the Faun. Uncovered within the remains of this building is a mosaic depicting two tragic theatrical masks surrounded by garlands, flowers and fruits. 15 drama masks recently rediscovered in Pompeii provide further evidence. These masks were life-sized, made of plaster and found in 1749 during a dig funded by King Charles of Bourbon. The exact location of where they were unearthed is not known as they were stored with a variety of other artefacts in the Royal Palace of Portici and 18th century dig journals provide only vague details of the excavation.

=== Literature ===
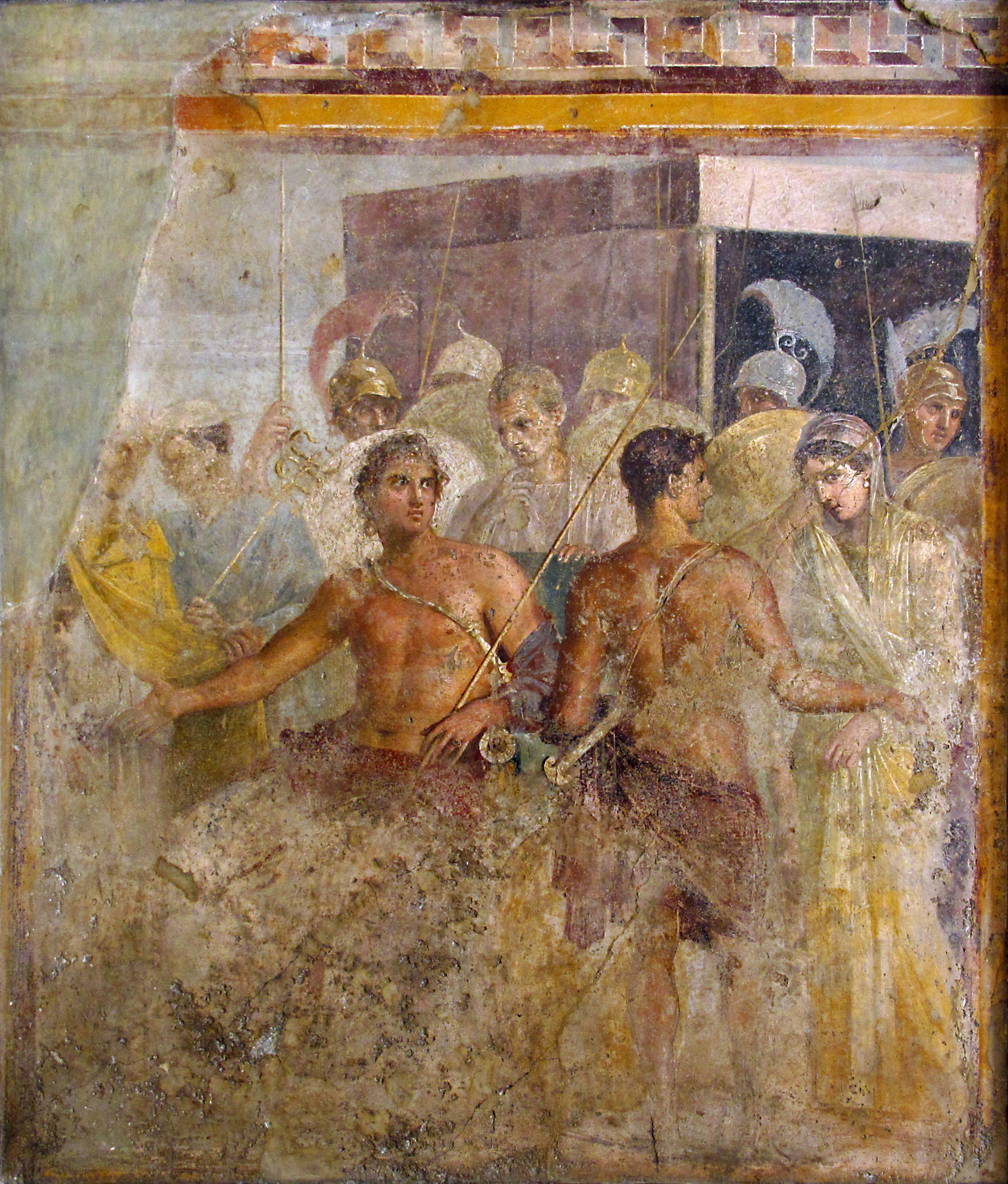
Achilles surrendering Briseis to Agamemnon, House of the Tragic Poet

The works and writers of Greek literature held a great influence over Roman culture. Beyond impacting Roman writing itself, scenes from Greek literature have been discovered throughout Pompeii. For instance, The House of the Tragic Poet displays a series of frescos which illustrate events from the Iliad by the Greek poet Homer. One panel displays the hero Achilles seated before his tent as he involuntarily releases his lover Briseis to Patroclus who guides her to Agamemnon, the king of the Greeks. The following panel, of which only half survives, portrays Helen as she steps from her homeland onto a ship which will transport her to Troy. It is believed that the lost fragment may have shown Paris, already in the ship, waiting for Helen, his queen, to join him.

== Origin of Egyptian influences ==
Rome had been politically intertwined with Egypt as early as the 2nd century BC during the rule of Ptolemy VI, however it was during the conflict between Octavian (later named Augustus) and Mark Antony and Cleopatra VII that Rome underwent a period of being considerably influenced by Egyptian culture. Under Roman rule by the 30 BC, Egypt began transmitting spoils of war and new materials such as glass, papyrus, minerals and ores to Rome. This conquest and influx of goods sparked a new fascination with ancient Egyptian culture with Romans now incorporating Egyptian art, architecture and religion into their own lives.

== Egyptian influences on Pompeii ==
=== Art ===
==== The Nile Mosaic ====
A mosaic within the House of the Faun depicts an Egyptian Nile scene complete with crocodiles, ichneumon, hippopotamus and ibis. Egyptian flora can also be seen on this mosaic.

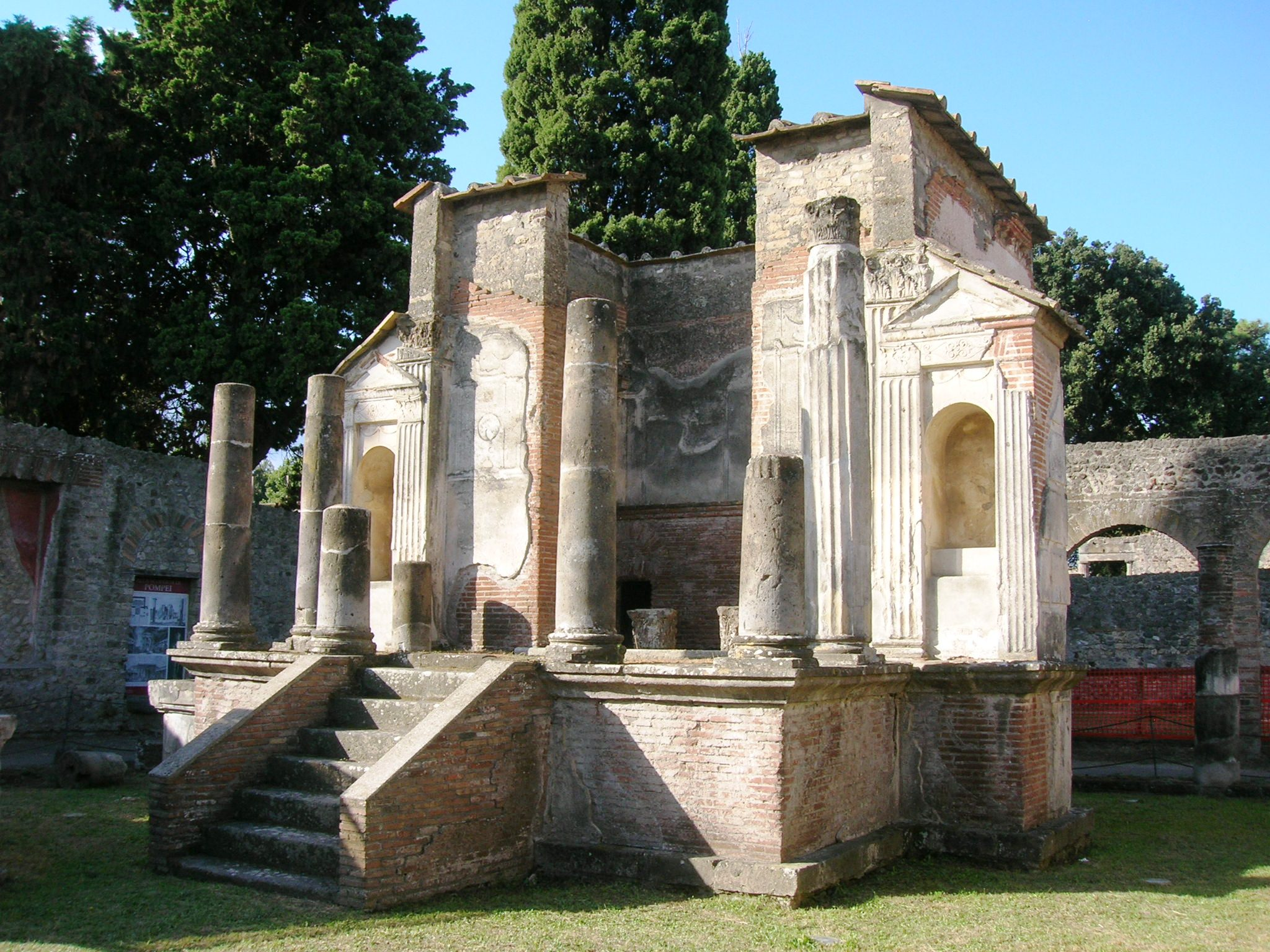
The Temple of Isis, Pompeii

The Temple of Isis

The Temple of Isis too portrayed an Egyptian influence on Pompeii’s art.

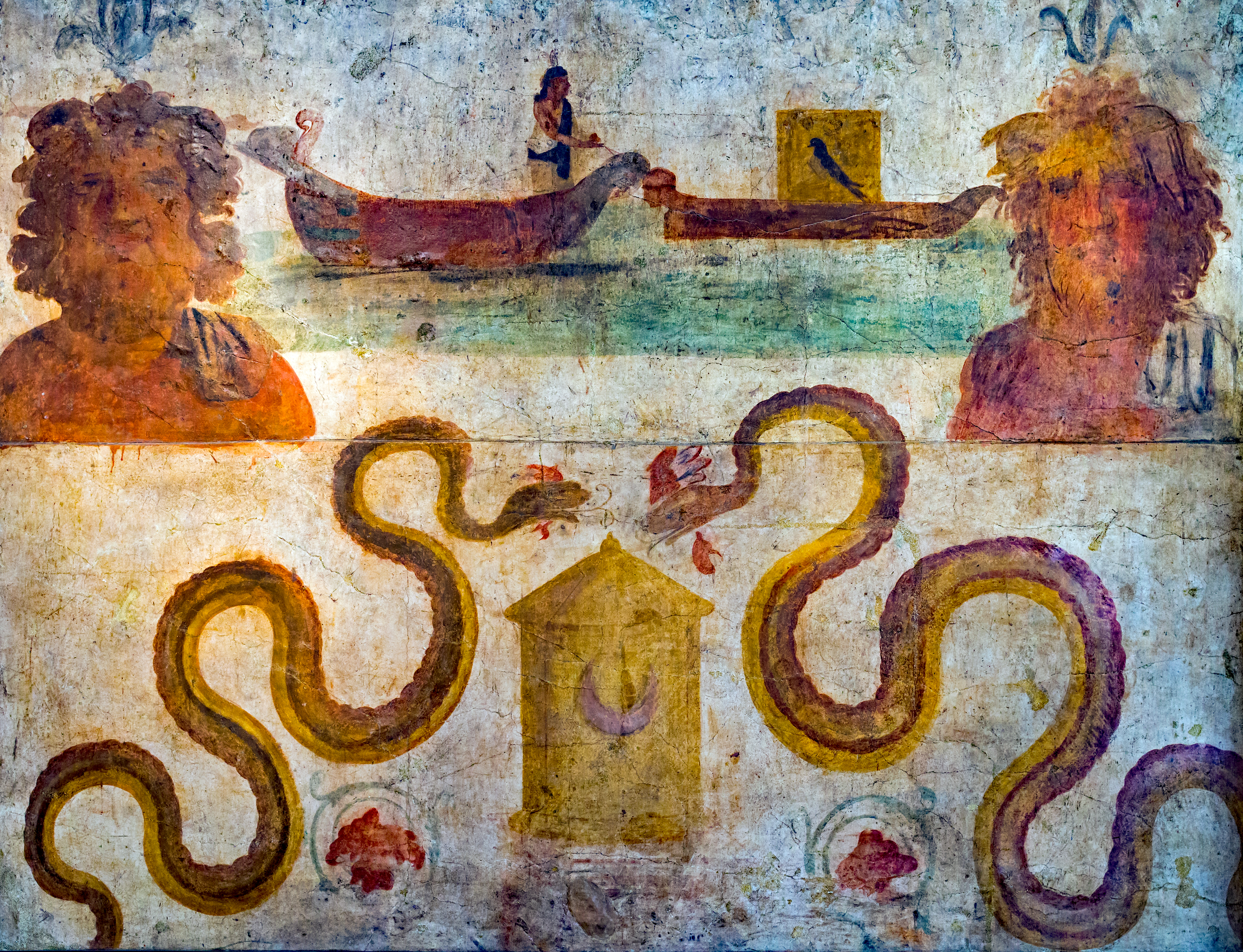
Wall painting of the Navigium Isidis from Pompeii VIII.7.28 (The Temple of Isis

Specifically, the walls of the temple are decorated with a variety of Egyptian mythological scenes. One fresco depicts the reception of lo by Isis at Canopus in Egypt. Isis in this artwork is surrounded by Egyptian animals (snakes and crocodiles) and motifs (such as a sphinx statue). Another fresco displays the event of navigum Isidis (the transport of Osiris by Isis) while another depicts Isaic priests and worshippers. A Pentelic marble statue of Isis was also uncovered at this temple. Similar to Egyptian hieroglyphics and statues, she is shown with her right foot in front of the left and holding an ankh.

Domestic Decoration

In the multicultural world that was the ancient Mediterranean, Egyptian influence is evident within Pompeiian houses from the broken pediment in wall paintings to the elevated podium in the style of the Temple of Isis. As for Egyptian techniques in Pompeiian decor, excavation of wall paintings suggests that Pompeiians used an Alexandrian-derived technique for creating a vibrant cerulean blue color. Though it has been argued that many Pompeiians may not have even understood how much Egyptian influence could be found in the artwork lining their homes, the presence and sharing of Egyptian material culture and techniques speaks to the multicultural influences throughout Campania.

=== Architecture ===
==== The House of Julia Felix ====
The peristyle (i.e. the garden) within The House of Julia Felix is believed to represent a branch of the Nile Delta, most likely the Canopus Canal in Egypt. This is due to the fact that it included a series of linked water channels and was decorated with statues, elegant stuccoed columns and marble walkways.

Decorative use of Sphinxes

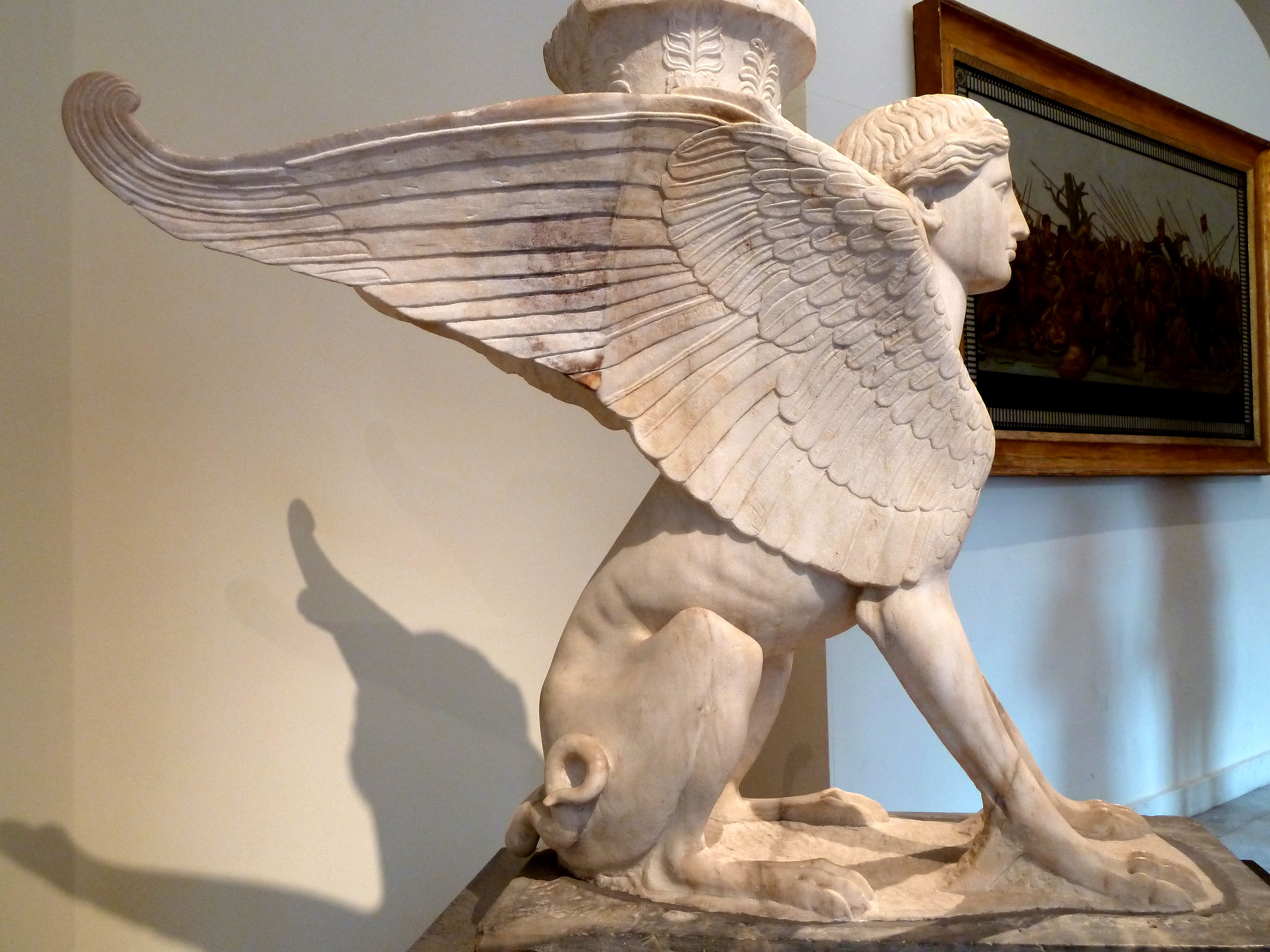
Table stand in the form a sphinx, House of the Faun

The Egyptian sphinx was uncovered in various private and public houses in Pompeii. For example, within the House of the Faun there is a table stand in the form of a sphinx. In the Tepidarium of the Forum Baths is a brazier with sphinx shaped feet.

=== Religion ===
==== The Cult of Isis ====
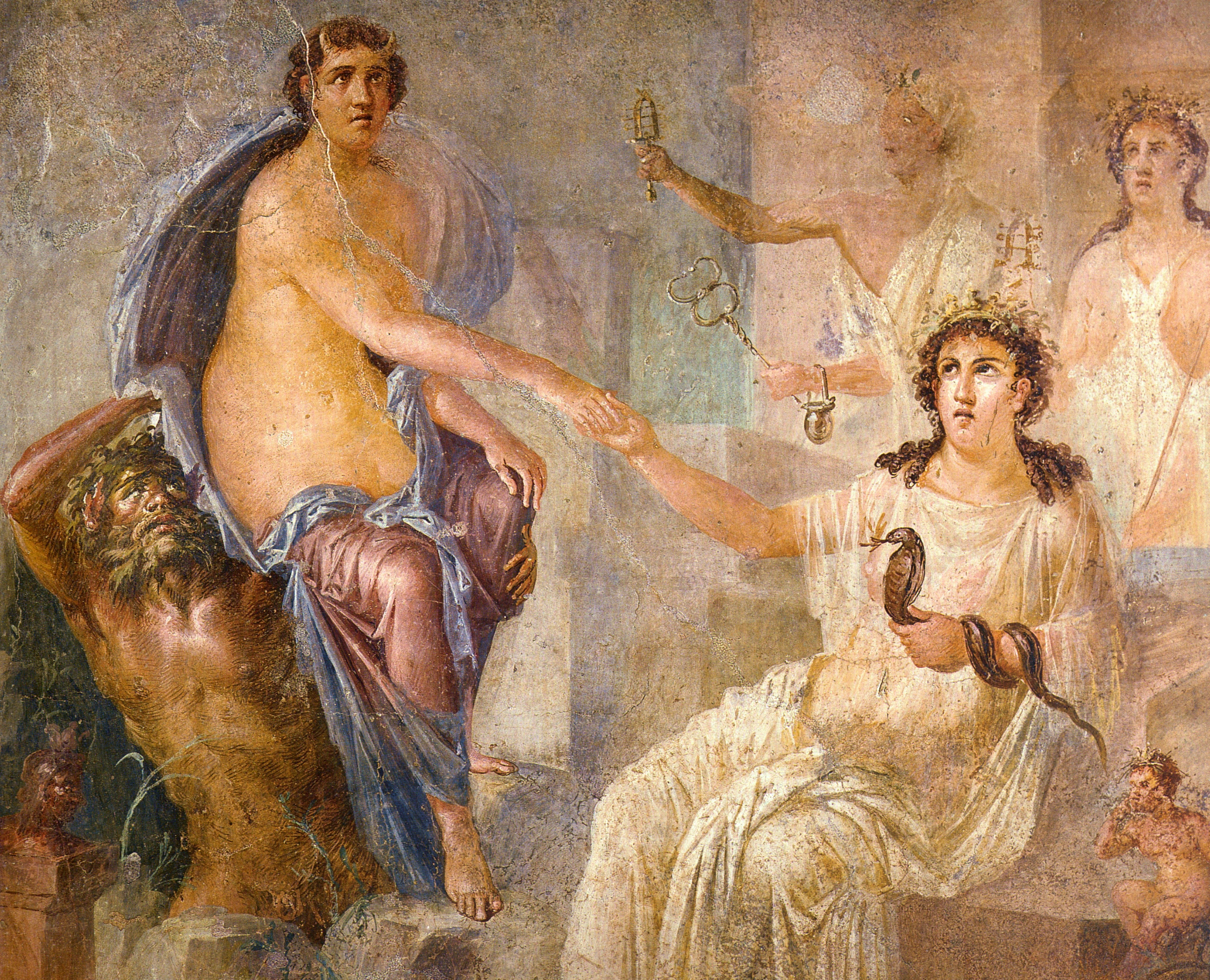
Fresco depicting lo and Isis, Temple of Isis

Isis was one of the central goddesses in ancient Egyptian religion and mythology. Evidence supporting the presence of the cult of Isis can be found in Puteoli, another Campanian city, as early as the beginning of the second century BCE. The Temple of Isis in Pompeii, which can also be traced back to the second century BCE, marks the rise of her cult. The cult became popular among slaves, freedmen, women and later the nobility with followers believing that Isis could grant eternal life as she resurrected her slain husband (Osiris) from the dead. Its foreignness to Romans and association with Cleopatra, especially during the transition from the Second Triumvirate to the reign of Augustus, sparked some contradictory actions by the Roman government. Leading up to and following the Battle of Actium, Augustus engaged in an ideological campaign which labeled Mark Antony as an effeminate other, made less manly and less Roman by his relationship with Cleopatra. Augustus's subsequent restoration of shrines to Isis signified that she could perhaps be welcomed into Roman religion even after her association with Cleopatra. However, his restriction of the worship of Isis to outside the pomerium in 28 BCE rendered the goddess definitively non-Roman, and demonstrated how uneasy the Roman governing elite were to envelop Egypt into the Roman sphere and risk a loss of identity. Regardless, the Romans needed Egyptian imports for survival, and had little choice but to syncretize deities like Osiris and Isis into their world. In Pompeii, this Romanization of Egyptian deities (Interpretatio Romana) can be seen in depictions of Isis-Venus, Isis-Fortuna, and even Isis-Ceres in frescos, gardens, and small objects throughout the city.

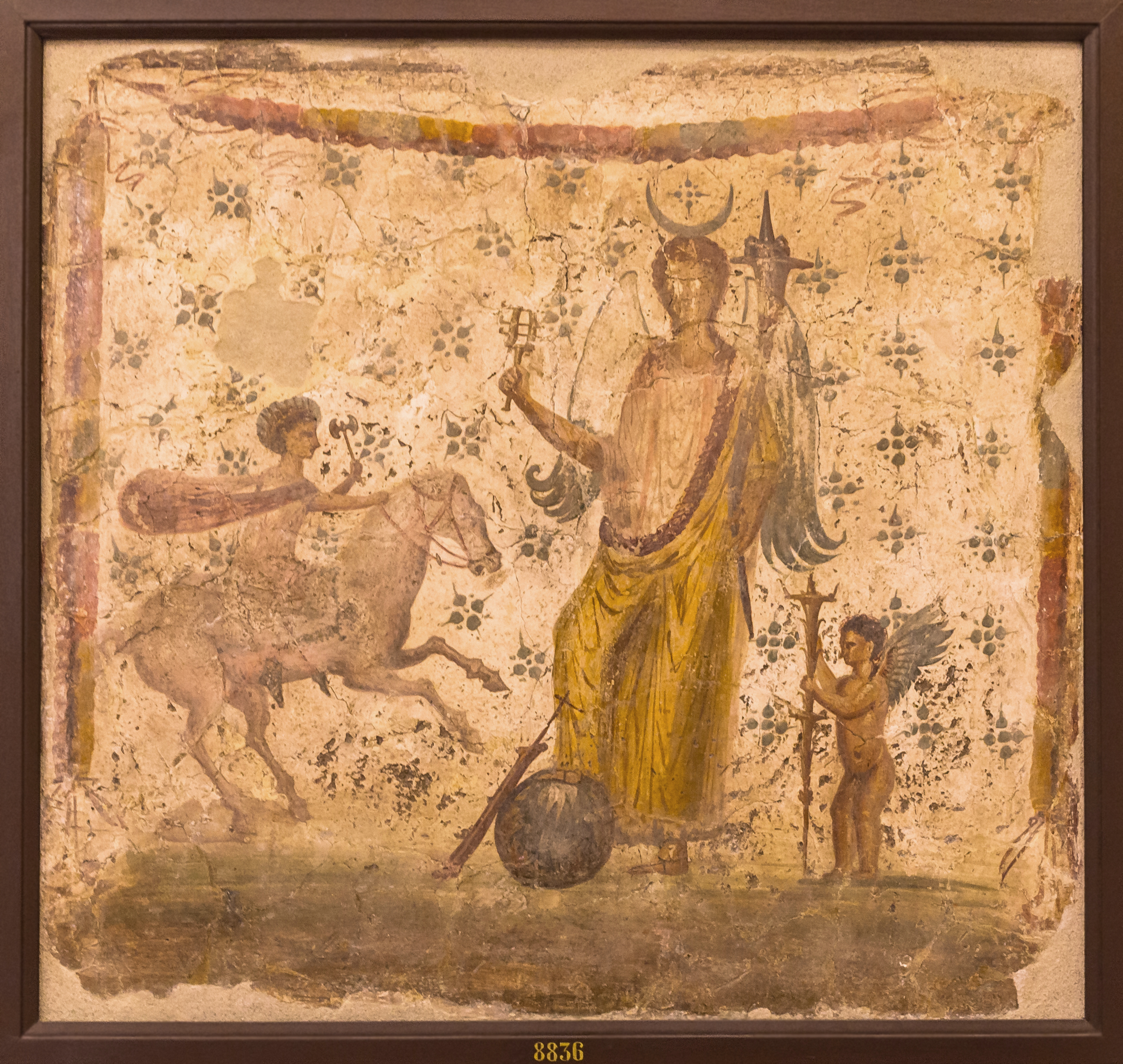
A fresco of Isis-Fortuna from Pompeii (Shop IX.3.7). From Bullettino archeologico italiano 1 (1862), plate 4.

The House of the Gilded Cupids (VI.16.7, 38) is an excellent example of the relationship between foreign deities and Roman deities in Pompeii. The house's two shrines, called lararia, feature Isis, Anubis, and Serapis on one, and Jupiter, Juno, and Minerva on the other. This shrine displays a fascination with the Egyptian deities but at the same time forces Egypt to be understood in the context of Roman religion, echoing the dual nature of Egyptomania among Romans at the time.

The temple dedicated to her worship is located in the theatre and gymnasium district of Pompeii. At this temple priests held two daily ceremonies. The first, celebrated before sunrise, memorialised the re-birth of Osiris while the second, celebrated in the afternoon, blessed sacred Nile water to give thanks to Isis. The Navigium Isidis, a celebration of Isis on March 5, included a procession to the ocean and was believed to bring blessings to people who, like many Pompeiians near the Bay of Naples, were involved in commercial trade by sea. The temple was destroyed during the 62 AD earthquake but was quickly rebuilt, displaying Isis’ popularity in Pompeii.

==== Anubis ====
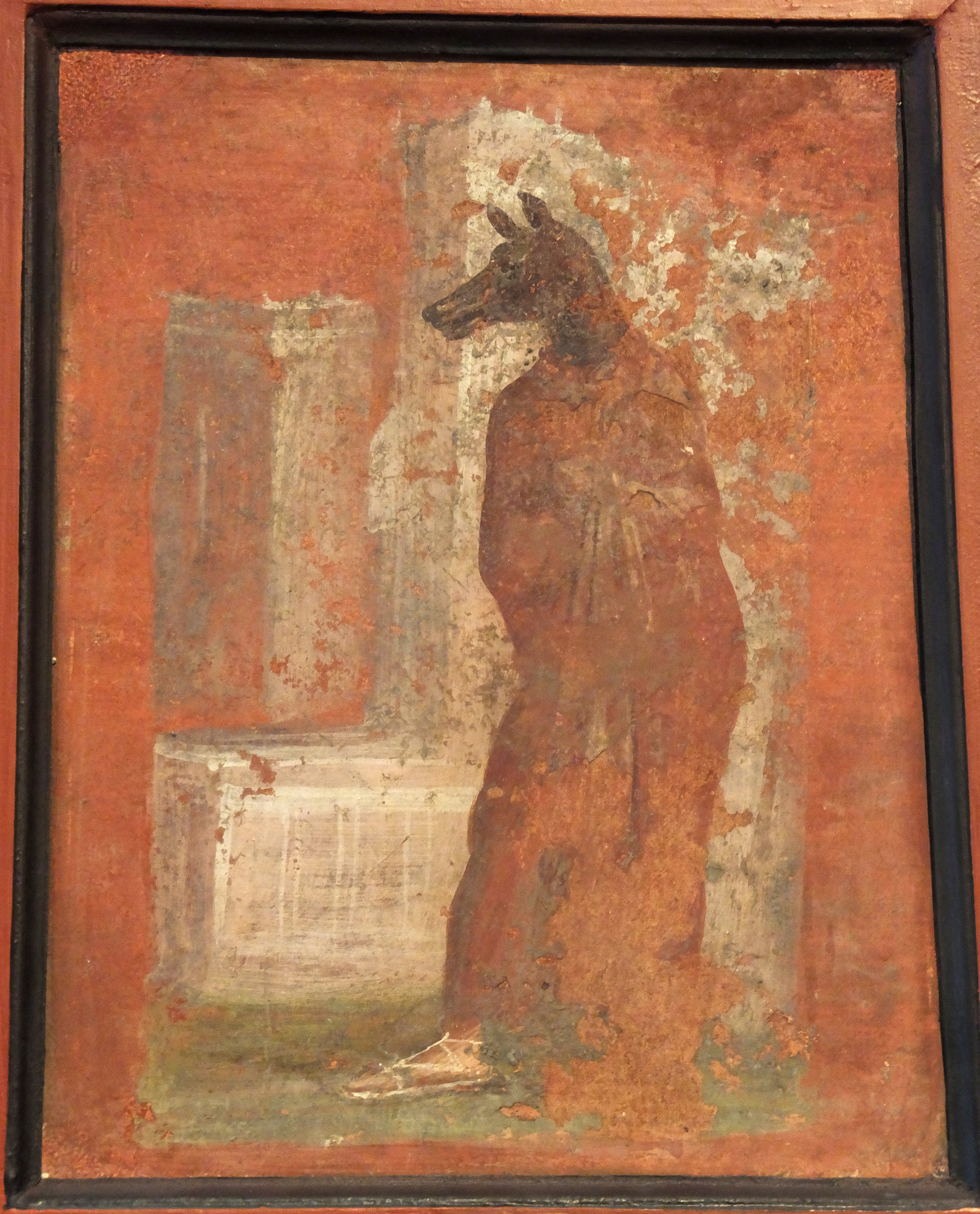
Priest with mask of Anubis, Temple of Isis

Anubis was the Egyptian God of the dead, associated specifically with mummification and the afterlife. Believed to be one of Egypt’s oldest gods, he is represented as a black canine or as a man with a canine head. Within Pompeii, The House of the Golden Cupids has a shrine dedicated to a number of Egyptian deities including Anubis. In this shrine, Anubis is shown with his customary canine head and holds a caduceus denoting his assimilation with the Roman god Mercury. Further evidence for his worship can be drawn from the Pompeian Temple of Isis which contains a fresco depicting a priest wearing a mask of Anubis.

==== Bes ====
Bes was a minor Egyptian god of war, sexuality, humour and music, however predominantly he was regarded as the protector of children and pregnant women. Within ancient art, this god was commonly depicted as a monstrous dwarf with large eyes, ears and a bearded head, protruding tongue, bowlegs and pronounced genitals. Multiple portrayals of Bes have been uncovered in Pompeii. Within the Temple of Isis, on the north wall of the Sacrarium, Bes is represented seated on a chair. Excavations completed by the Anglo-American Project in Insulae VI have also produced several bronze coins with the figure of Bes imprinted on them. Specifically, these coins were a combination of imports from Ebusus and locally manufactured imitations. The Pompeian imitations were initially quite similar to their originals however over time the portrayal of Bes was simplified resulting in a vague stick figure illustration of the Egyptian god. Other unearthed coins portray Bes with symbols such as toads or horse heads while others depict him with a butting bull or the head of a Roman God, most commonly Apollo.
