= Anti-paganism policies of the early Byzantine Empire =

Anti-paganism of the Byzantine Empire

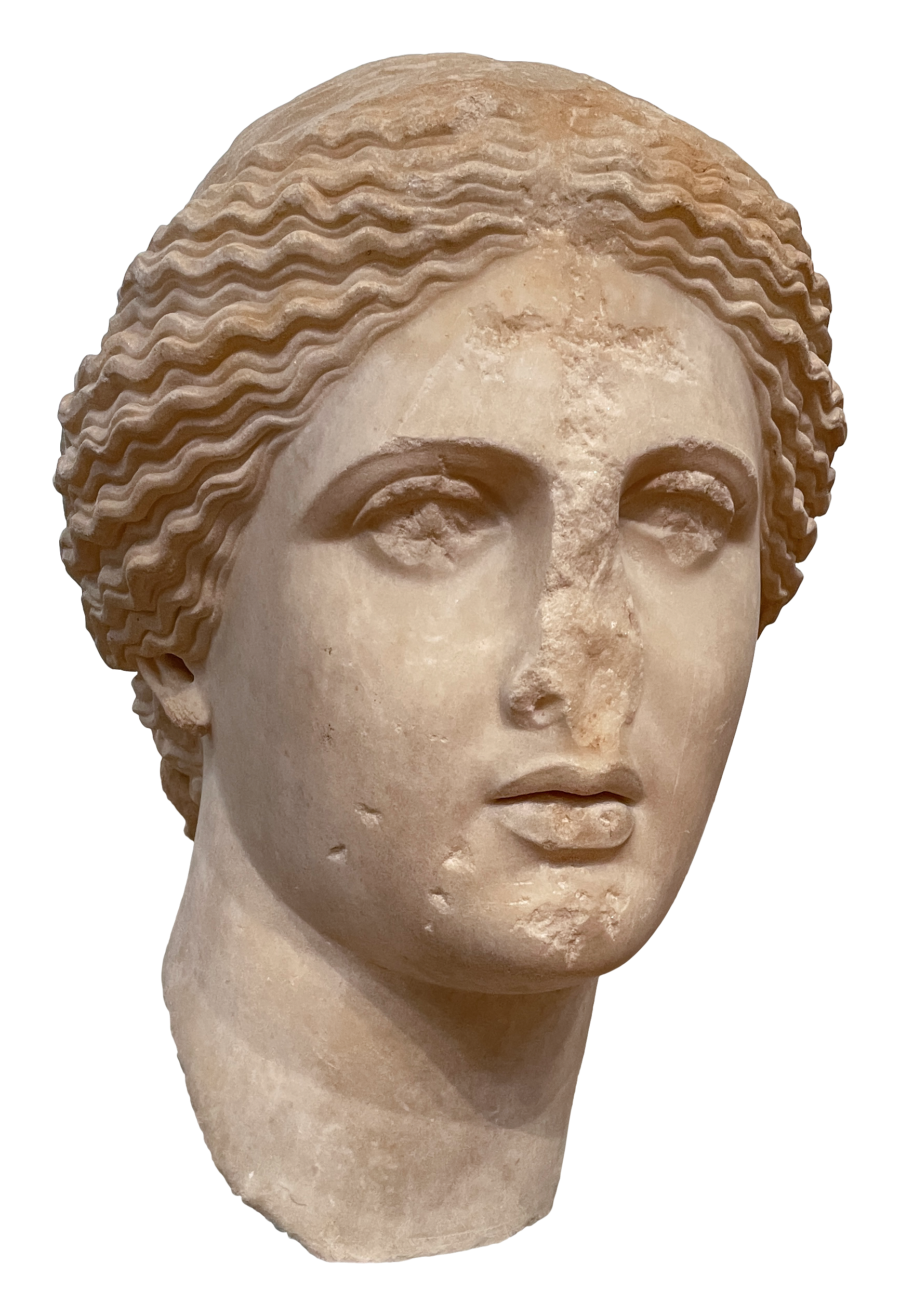
Head of Aphrodite, 1st century AD copy of an original by Praxiteles. Christian cross defacing the chin and forehead. Found in the Agora of Athens. National Archaeological Museum in Athens.

The anti-paganism policies of the early Byzantine Empire ranged from 395 till 567. Anti-paganism laws were enacted by the Byzantine Emperors Arcadius, Honorius, Theodosius II, Marcian and Leo I the Thracian. They reiterated previous legal bans, especially on pagan religious rites and sacrifices and increased the penalties for their practice. The pagan religions had still many followers but they were increasingly obliged to keep under cover to formally comply with the edicts. Significant support for paganism was present among Roman nobles, senators, magistrates, imperial palace officers, and other officials.

Many Christians pretended to be such while continuing pagan practices, and many converted back to paganism; numerous laws against apostasy kept being promulgated and penalties increased since the time of Gratian and Theodosius. Pagans were openly voicing their resentment in historical works, like the writings of Eunapius and Olympiodorus, and books blaming the Christian hegemony for the 410 Sack of Rome. Christians destroyed almost all such pagan political literature, and threatened copyists with cutting off their hands.

Laws declared that buildings belonging to known pagans and heretics were to be appropriated by the churches. St. Augustine exhorted his congregation in Carthage to smash all tangible symbols of paganism they could lay their hands on.

The persecution was somewhat reduced in some periods under the influence of the high-ranking general Stilicho and under the "usurper" Joannes Primicerius; a revival was attempted by Anthemius from 467.

== The legacy of Theodosius I ==
Whilst "paganism, with Theodosius dies, never to rise again", according to a Christian historian committed pagans continued, wherever possible, to practice their faith discreetly or under cloak of common festivals and by keeping within the letter of the law if not its spirit, more commonly in the countryside, hence they are called "rustics - the pagani".

Upon the death of Theodosius, in 395, the Empire was divided between his two incompetent sons. Political crisis ensued; over the next several decades, the defence of the Empire gradually collapsed. During this prolonged disaster, some Christians became less certain of their religion and converted back to the old religion. Pagans blamed the Christians for the disasters affecting the empire.

Despite the pleas of many pagans for tolerance, Honorius and Arcadius continued the work of their father by enacting even more anti-paganism laws to stop any revival of paganism. The fact that they had to keep repeating their threats by the enactment of numerous laws against the practice of paganism indicates that their efforts did not succeed in stamping out the old religion, which continued to be practiced discreetly.

During the early part of the reign of Honorius, Stilicho was able to exercise unlimited power over the west. Stilicho exercised moderation in his religious policies and enacted laws that were favorable to the pagans. Consequently, during the time in which Stilicho held power, the pagans enjoyed a brief respite from persecution.

=== Arcadius laws, 395 ===
On July 3, 395, Arcadius declared that the solemn days of the pagans were no longer to be included in the number of holidays. But the festival of the Navigium Isidis, and other pagan holidays, outlived this law.

In the same year, another law was passed by Arcadius that prohibited anyone from going to a pagan sanctuary or temple or of celebrating any kind of pagan sacrifice. This law seems to have been targeted at those Christians who were converting back to paganism as it specifically mentions "those who are trying to stray from the dogma of the Catholic faith." In the year 396, the privileges of pagan priests and other clerics were officially revoked. In the same year, Arcadius ordered that pagan temples standing in the country were to be destroyed without disorder or riot such that they could not be used for pagan religious rites away from gaze of the authorities. The large number of pagans in the east also seems to have forced Arcadius into allowing the ancient festivals and public games to continue but without religious rites that formed an essential part of the old religion.

=== Stilicho laws, 399 ===
In 399, three laws were enacted in the west, under the influence of Stilicho, which were relatively favorable to the pagans. Due to the riots caused by Christians in their attempts to destroy the temples, the first of these laws protected the pagan temples from the destruction of zealous Christians who pretended that they had been authorized by the government to destroy them. The second of these laws acknowledged the right of the people to continue to participate in traditional banquets, shows, gatherings and amusements once associated with the old pagan ways; it did, however, forbid the public performance of any pagan religious rites or sacrifice, an intrinsic part of a religion supported by custom rather than by argument. The third law forbade the destruction of pagan temples that had been cleared of forbidden things and ordered that they were to be kept in good repair even though the purpose for which they were first built was now prohibited.

=== Destructions by St. Augustine ===
At the turn of the century St Augustine would exhort his congregation in Carthage to smash all tangible symbols of paganism they could lay their hands on "for that all superstition of pagans and heathens should be annihilated is what God wants, God commands, God proclaims!" – words uttered to wild applause, and possibly the cause of religious riots resulting in sixty deaths. It is estimated that pagans still made up half of the Empire's population.

=== Persecution laws by Honorius since 407 ===
In the year 407 a decree was issued to the west from Rome: "If any images stand even now in the temples and shrines...., they shall be torn from their foundations...The temples situated in cities or towns shall be taken for public use. Altars shall be destroyed in all places." After the death of Stilicho in 408, Honorius and his party in the state will gain control and enact once again harsh laws against pagans.

In the year 408, Honorius enacted a new law which ordered that all statues and altars in the temples were to be removed and that the temple buildings and their income were to be appropriated by the government. This law also forbade the holding of any banquet or celebration in vicinity of the temples that was being used by pagans in the countryside as a pretext and cover for religious celebrations. The execution of this law was placed in the hands of the bishops. Two other laws decreed that buildings belonging to known pagans and heretics were to be appropriated by the churches.

Arcadius died in 408 and his eight-year-old son, Theodosius II was thereupon proclaimed emperor in the East. In the same year, Honorius enacted a law that prohibited anyone who was not Catholic from performing imperial service within the palace. Zosimus reports that Honorius was forced to repeal this law after one of his best officers, who was a pagan, resigned in protest. At the beginning of the year 409, Honorius enacted a law that punished judges and officials who did not enforce the laws against the pagans. This law even punished men of rank who simply kept silent over any pagan rite performed in their own city or district.

=== Sack of Rome by Alaric I, 410 ===
The hopes of the pagans were revived with the elevation of Priscus Attalus, at Rome, in the year 409. Alaric I, however, soon tired of his puppet and Attalus was deposed in the summer of 410 when Honorius promised to negotiate a peace treaty.

When these negotiations failed, Alaric took and sacked the city of Rome. This catastrophe shocked the entire Roman world. Coming so soon after the proscription of the old religion, pagans began to blame Christianity and the neglect of the traditional rites for something that had hitherto been thought impossible. In this heated atmosphere, Honorius once again reiterated his anti-pagan legislation.

=== The attack on pagan literature ===
Augustine's City of God is an answer to the charges that Christianity and its persecution on paganism was responsible for the precedently unimaginable Sack of Rome. Little of this class of literature written from a pagan perspective has survived, which was due to Christians who destroyed these political works they considered to be contrary to their religious beliefs, and threatened copyists with the cutting of their hands. The transmission path of all such literature has been described as a "differentially permeable membrane" that "allowed the writings of Christianity to pass through but not of Christianity's enemies." "Our sole copy of the sole work about political good sense by the person arguably best able to deliver it to us from classical antiquity, Cicero," writes Ramsay MacMullen, "was sponged out from the vellum to make room for the hundredth copy of Augustine's meditation on the psalms."

The only fragments of Julian's "Against the Galileans" that have survived Christian censorship appear in a refutation by Bishop Cyril of Alexandria. By the time Augustine had published the early books that comprised "The City of God" he describes how pagan authors in North Africa felt it too dangerous to publish their refutations and Augustine writes nothing to reassure them about this threat. There are numerous fragments extant of several pagan historical works, such as the works of Eunapius and Olympiodorus, which indicate that pagans were openly voicing their resentment in writing.

=== More anti-pagan laws since 415 ===
Some pagans would appear to have continued to practice their faith when circumstances permitted, as the emperors continued issuing laws. In the year 415, Honorius enacted yet another law that appropriated the pagan temples, even though they were no longer used for their intended purpose, and ordered that all objects that had been consecrated for pagan sacrifices in the past were to be removed from public places.

In 416, Honorius and Theodosius II ordered that pagans would no longer be admitted to imperial service nor would they be allowed to receive the rank of administrator or judge. In 423, Theodosius II reiterated the previous laws against pagans and declared that all pagans who were caught performing the ancient rites would now have all their goods confiscated and be exiled but at the same time seemingly indicating that there were few pagans left: "The pagans who remain, although we believe there are none.."

== Joannes Primicerius ==
In August of the year 423, Honorius died and power was seized in the west by Joannes, who had held the office of Primicerius Notariorum. Joannes appears to have ushered in a period of religious toleration. Joannes seems to have attempted to curb the power of ecclesiastics and the privileges of the church in an attempt to treat all people equally. In the year 423, Theodosius II published a law that demanded that Christians (whether they were really such or pretended to be so) were not to disturb pagans who were living peaceably and doing nothing contrary to the law.

In 425, Theodosius II accompanied an expedition to the west to depose Joannes and establish Valentinian III as emperor of the west. After Joannes was captured and executed, Valentinian III was proclaimed emperor in the city of Rome.

== Theodosius II anti-pagan laws since 425 ==
Theodosius II enacted two anti-pagan laws in the year 425. The first of these stipulated that all pagan superstition was to be rooted out. The second law barred pagans from pleading a case in court and also disqualified them from serving as soldiers. Theodosius II then left Valentinian III to rule the west and returned to Constantinople.

The numerous laws against pagans seems to have had only limited immediate effect in stamping out the old religion. Many people simply conformed outwardly and pretended to become Christian while secretly continuing to practice their beliefs. The numerous laws against apostasy, that had been continuously promulgated since the time of Gratian and Theodosius, is evidence that the emperors were having a hard time even keeping Christians from going astray.

In the year 426, Theodosius II made it illegal for Christian apostates to convert to the old religion, and against those who pretended to become Christian but continued to perform pagan sacrifices. He found it necessary to reiterate his prohibition of pagan rites and sacrifices in 435, this time increasing the penalty to death. This law also ordered that all pagan shrines, temples and sanctuaries that still existed were to be destroyed by the magistrates. Magistrates who failed to carry out this order were ordered to be punished with death. In 438 Theodosius legislated again, forbidding pagan sacrifice once more. Theodosius seems to admit that pagan sacrifices were still seemingly being openly celebrated in places. It reads:

Hence our clemency perceives the need of keeping watch over the pagans and their heathen enormities, since by natural depravity and stubborn lawlessness, they forsake the path of true religion. They disdain in any way to perform the nefarious rites of sacrifice and the false errors of their baleful superstition by some means or other in the hidden solitudes, unless their crimes are made public by the profession of their crimes to insult divine majesty and to show scorn to our age. Not the thousand terrors of laws already promulgated nor the penalty of exile pronounced upon them deter these men, whereby, if they cannot reform, at least they might learn to abstain from their mass of their crimes and the multitude of their sacrifices. But their insane audacity transgresses continually; our patience is exhausted by their wicked behavior so that if we desired to forget them, we could not disregard them.

Theodosius II married Eudocia, the daughter of a pagan sophist named Leontius, who herself patronized various pagans including Cyrus of Panopolis and the poet Nonnus.

== Anti-pagan laws by Marcian (450–457) ==
The continued vitality of pagans led Marcian, who became emperor of the east in 450 upon the death of Theodosius II, to repeat earlier prohibitions against pagan rites. Marcian decreed, in the year 451, that those who continued to perform the pagan rites would suffer the confiscation of their property and be condemned to death. Marcian also prohibited any attempt to re-open the temples and ordered that they were to remain closed. In addition to this, in order to encourage strict enforcement of the law a fine of fifty pounds of gold was imposed on any judge or governor, as well as the officials under him, who did not enforce this law. However, not even this act by Marcian had the desired effect, as his successor Leo I the Thracian will have to issue a new anti-pagan law in 472.

Two more laws against paganism, which may be from this period, are preserved in the Justinian Code. After the deposition of Avitus, who ruled as emperor of the West from 455 to 456, there seems to have been a conspiracy among the Roman nobles to place the pagan general Marcellinus on the throne to restore paganism; but it came to nothing.

== Attempted pagan revival by Anthemius ==
Anthemius, one of the last Roman emperors of the West who ruled from 467 to 472, seems to have planned a pagan revival at Rome. He was a descendant of Procopius, the relative of Julian. Anthemius gave Messius Phoebus Severus, a pagan philosopher who was a close friend of his, the important offices of Praefectus urbi of Rome, Consul and Patrician. Anthemius placed the image of Hercules, in the act of vanquishing the Nemean lion, on his coins. The murder of Anthemius (by Ricimer) destroyed the hopes of those pagans who believed that the traditional rites would now be restored.

== Anti-pagan laws by Leo I (457–474) ==
In the year 457, Leo I the Thracian succeeded Marcian and became the first emperor to be crowned by the Patriarch of Constantinople.

In 472 Leo I published a new law in 472 which imposed severe penalties for the owner of any property who was aware that pagan rites were performed on his property. If the property owner was of high rank he was punished by the loss of his rank or office and by the confiscation of his property. If the property owner was of lower status he would be physically tortured and then condemned to labor in the mines for the rest of his life.

== Revolt of Illus (484–488) ==
In 484, the Pagan opposition supported the rebellion of Illus and Leontius (usurper) in an effort to end the persecution, but his Pagan supported rebellion was suppressed by Zeno (emperor) in 488, which signified the last organized Pagan resistance in the Byzantine Empire. In 491, Anastasius I Dicorus became the first emperor to swear upon his Christian faith before ascending the throne.

== Anti-pagan laws by Justinian I (527–565) ==
In 527, Emperor Justinian I banned all Pagans from the right to hold public office and order the confiscation of their property.

According to the sixth-century historian Procopius, the Isis temple of Philae in Byzantine Egypt was closed down officially in AD 537 by the local commander Narses the Persarmenian in accordance with an order of Byzantine emperor Justinian I. This event is conventionally considered to mark the end of ancient Egyptian religion. Some adherence to traditional religion seems to have survived into the sixth century, based on a petition from Dioscorus of Aphrodito to the governor of the Thebaid dated to 567. The letter warns of an unnamed man (the text calls him “eater of raw meat”) who, in addition to plundering houses and stealing tax revenue, is alleged to have restored paganism at “the sanctuaries,” possibly referring to the temples at Philae.

== See also ==
- Anti-paganism policy of Constantius II
- Christianization of the Roman Empire
- Edict of Thessalonica
- History of Christian thought on persecution and tolerance
- Mos maiorum
- Persecution of pagans in the late Roman Empire
- Persecution of pagans under Theodosius I
- Religion in ancient Rome
- Restoration and tolerance of Paganism from Julian until Valens
- Revival of Roman paganism
- Roman imperial cult
