= Di Cecco =

Di Cecco (pronounced [di ˈtʃekko]) is an Italian surname, derived from the given name Cecco. Notable people with the surname include:

- Alberico Di Cecco (born 1974), Italian long-distance and marathon runner
- Domenico Di Cecco (born 1983), Italian footballer
- Domenico di Cecco, 15th-century Italian painter
- Felice Di Cecco (born 1994), Italian footballer
- Francescuccio di Cecco Ghissi (fl. 1359–1395), Italian painter
- Giovanni di Cecco, 14th-century Italian architect and sculptor
- Gregorio di Cecco (c. 1390–c. 1424), Italian painter

== See also ==
- De Cecco (surname)
