= De Cecco (surname) =

De Cecco (pronounced [de ˈtʃekko]) is a surname of Italian origin, derived from the given name Cecco. Notable people with the surname include:

- John Paul De Cecco (1925–2017), American academic
- Luciano De Cecco (born 1988), Argentine volleyball player
- Marcello De Cecco (1939–2016), Italian economist

== See also ==
- Di Cecco
