= Temple of Isis (Pompeii) =

Roman temple

Coordinates: 40°44′57″N 14°29′17.8″E

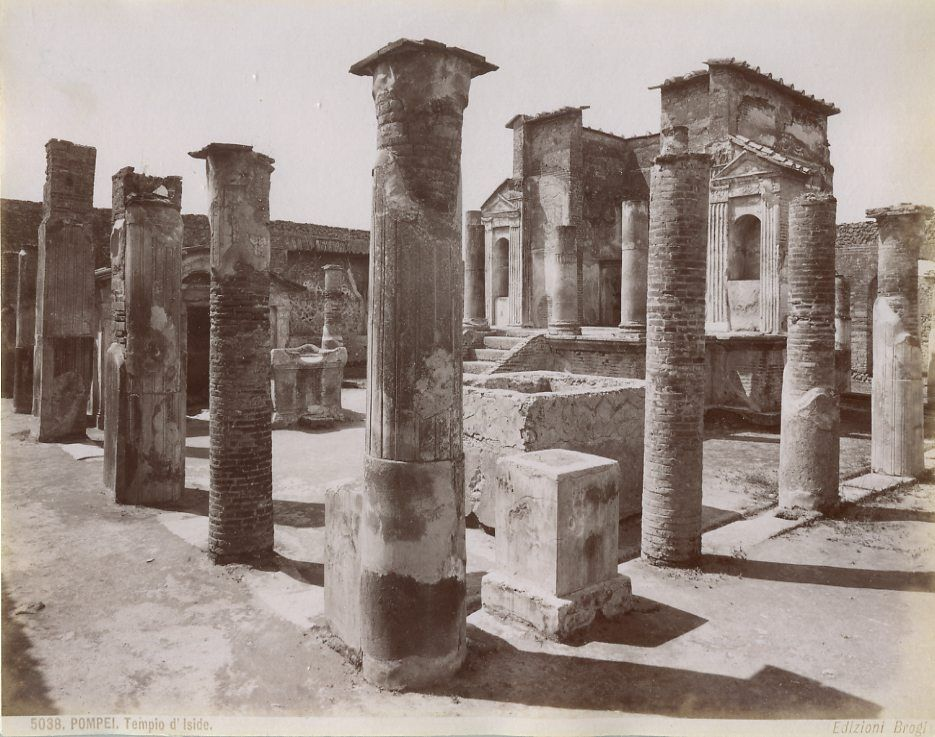
The Temple of Isis in Pompeii (c. 1870)

The Temple of Isis is a Roman temple dedicated to the Egyptian goddess Isis. This small and almost intact temple was one of the first discoveries during the excavation of Pompeii in 1764. Its role as a Hellenized Egyptian temple in a Roman colony was fully confirmed with an inscription detailed by Francisco la Vega on July 20, 1765. Original paintings and sculptures can be seen at the Museo Archaeologico in Naples; the site itself remains on the Via del Tempio di Iside. In the aftermath of the temple's discovery many well-known artists and illustrators swarmed to the site.

The preserved Pompeian temple is actually the second structure; the original building built during the reign of Augustus was damaged in an earlier earthquake, in 62 AD. Previously to this, in both 54 BCE and 30 BCE, the Roman senate had issued proclamations demanding that the cult of Isis and her temples be demolished. It is reported that there were no volunteers to undertake this process, and that the cult only grew in popularity from this point, so much so that the Temple of Isis was one of the only buildings to be fully rebuilt after the earthquake. At the time of the 79 AD eruption of Vesuvius, the Iseum was the only temple to have been completely re-built; even the Capitolium had not been. Although the Iseum was wedged into a small and narrow space, it received significant foot traffic from theater-goers at the Large Theater, businessmen in the Triangular Forum, and others along the Stabian Gate.

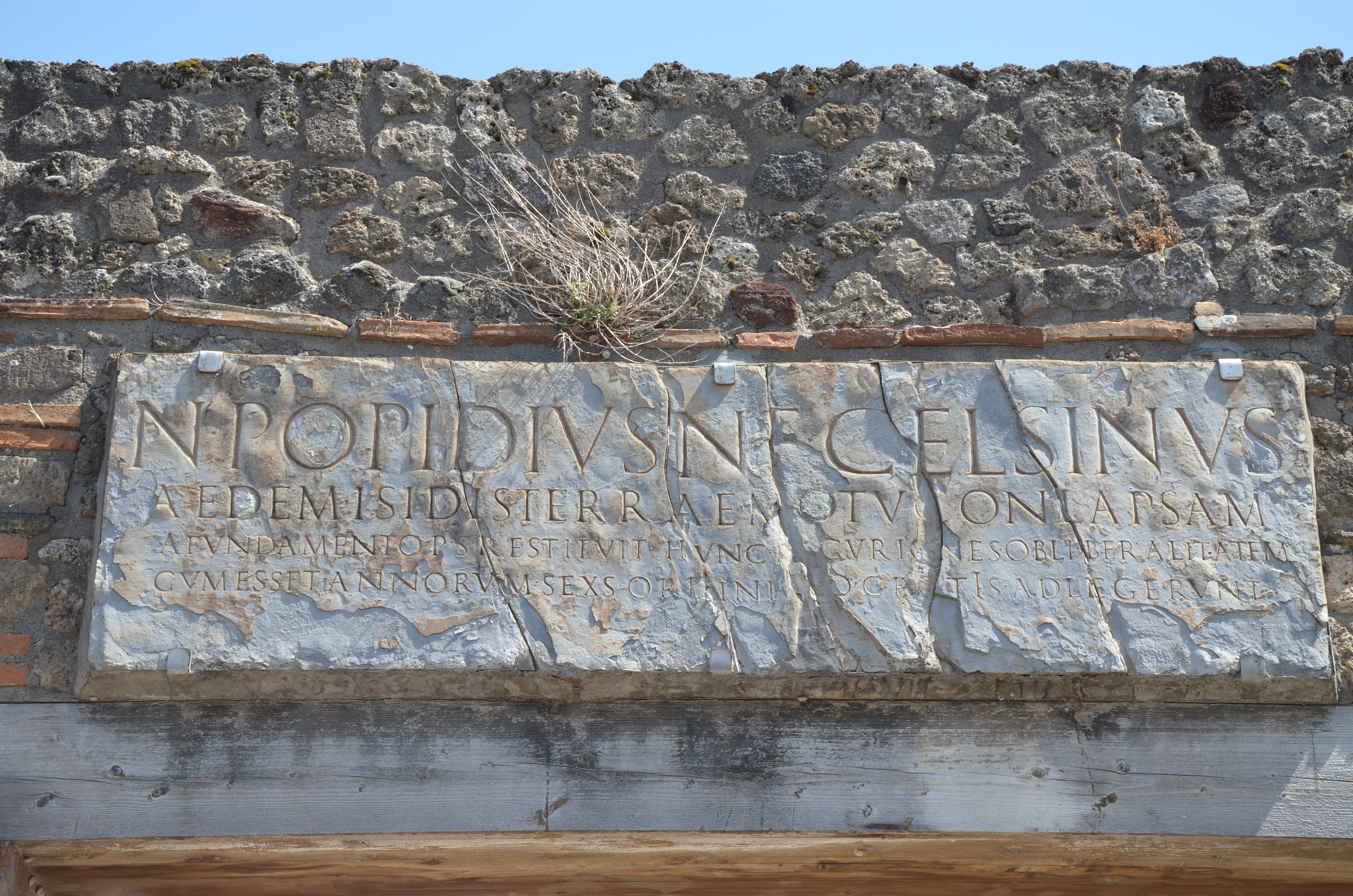
Copy of the honorary inscription from The Temple of Isis. Its Latin text translates to: "Numerius Popidius Ampliatus, son of Numerius, at his own expense restored from its foundations the Temple of Isis, which had collapsed in the earthquake. Because of his generosity, although he was six years old, the councillors enrolled him into their number without fee."

Principal devotees of this temple are assumed to be women, freedmen, and slaves. Initiates of the Isis mystery cult worshipped a compassionate goddess who promised eventual salvation and a perpetual relationship throughout life and after death. The temple itself was reconstructed in honor of a 6-year-old boy named Numerius Popidius Celsinus by his freedman father, Numerius Popidius Ampliatus, and his mother Corelia Celsa, to allow the child to enter elite society. Many scenes from the temple are re-created in the dining rooms of Pompeians, indicating that many individuals visited this temple for political, economic, or social reasons.

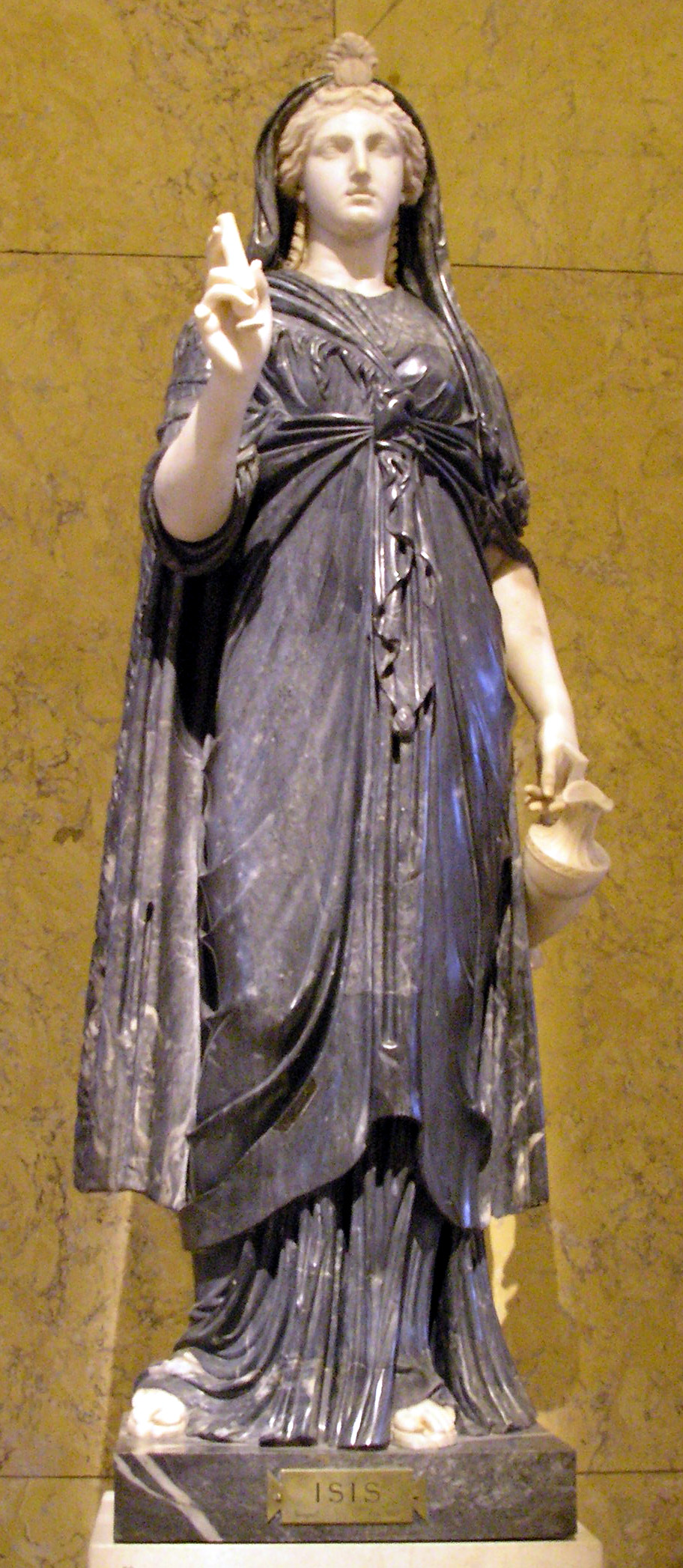
Greco-Roman depiction of Isis

== Isis in Pompeii ==
The cult of Isis is thought to have arrived in Pompeii around 100 BCE; the existing temple was built following the destruction of its predecessor in the earthquake of 62 CE. Though Isis' origins were in Ancient Egypt, her cult spread widely throughout the Greco-Roman world. The Greeks and Romans always had admiration for Egyptian culture, and before Alexander the Great conquered Egypt, there was a cultural fusion between Greeks and Egyptians. After Alexander's defeat of Egypt in the fourth century, the Greeks started to incorporate Isis into their pantheon of deities. Isis was easily accepted into Greek religion because of her many similarities to the Greek goddess, Demeter. Eventually, she became the patron goddess of the sea, as a protector of people traveling by sea. One of her major temples was on the island of Philae. In Rome, Isis was introduced as a replacement deity for Venus, after the death of Caesar, and was looked to for guidance. Three years after the Battle of Actium, in 28 BCE, Octavian encouraged the worship of Isis and the rebuilding of her associated temples, but strictly outside the borders of the pomerium. Octavian thus incorporated Egyptian culture into his newly forming empire while clearly distinguishing his idea of Roman identity as separate from foreign cultures. Among the Greeks and Romans, she was known as Isis because the Egyptian word for “throne” translates to “Isis” in Greek. Isis is most associated with fertility and motherhood, and was looked to as the ideal image of a queen, wife, and mother but is also known for powers in healing and magic. Because she was a fertility deity, she was looked up to by women. She was the friend of slaves, sinners, artisans, and the downtrodden, who also listened to the prayers of the wealthy, maidens, aristocrats and rulers. For women specifically, participation in the cult of Isis provided an opportunity to engage with religion on a level similar to that of men, to enter the public sphere with a role as a priestess that they otherwise could not obtain in Roman state cults, and to earn salvation through a cleansing initiation into the cult. These untraditional options for women began to revolutionize what Roman religion could be. Devotion to Isis was also intimately coupled with the acquisition of knowledge, considered an endowment of the gods. There are a couple of Hellenistic versions of Isis: one depicts her as holding a musical instrument in her right hand, and a water pitcher in the other. The other models her similarly to Demeter, in which she holds corn in her right hand, rather than the instrument. Her left hand is placed at her waist.

== Architecture ==
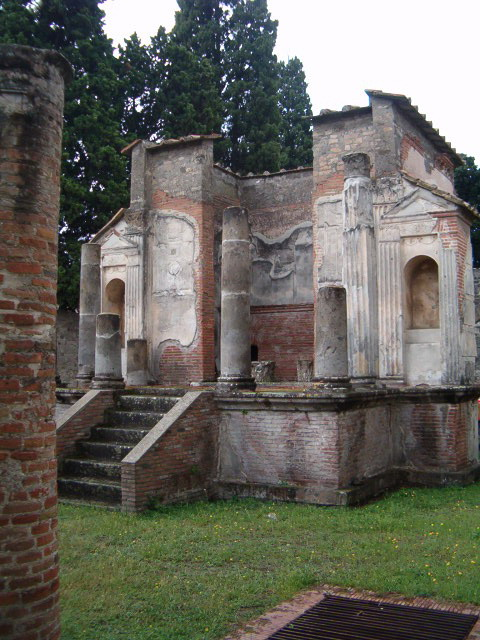
Temple of Isis in 2007

The Temple of Isis sits on a platform which is elevated off the ground, and entered in by way of stairs. The temple is designed based on a north-east and south-west plan. It features a vaulted roof, drawing attention to the top of the building. This style of roofing was a Roman stylistic influence, yet was becoming phased out by the time the temple was built. Weber, who excavated the temple, speculated that the Temple of Isis was built according to the Corinthian order. The Temple of Isis had two sections: an outer space surrounded by columns, called the pronaos; and the inner area - naos - which housed the statues of Isis and Osiris. Both areas of the temple were entered and exited through ornate niches. The architecture of the Temple of Isis is a fusion of Greek, Roman, and Egyptian features, incorporating Egyptian statues in the design. The mixture of Eastern stylistic influences with Hellenistic paid tribute to Isis' Egyptian roots, while still keeping the imagery domestic. In comparison to authentic Egyptian temples, the Temple of Isis was very much in line with the Roman architectural style. Egyptian features of this temple include: purgatorium, a roofless enclosure in the southeast corner of the courtyard that demarcates a subterranean room with a basin for Nile waters. The water from the Nile functioned as holy water used for rituals. The structure itself resembles a miniature temple with pediments and pilasters at the entrance coated with stucco. Structurally, it is built with columns all around; twenty-nine total. Though it is not a large structure, both the interior and exterior of the monument are elaborately decorated. Inside the inner chapel was a holding space for a statue of Isis. Further into the temple are altars and recesses in the walls; outside of the temple was a crypt used for initiating members into the cult. It also features a large room - called an Ekklesiasterion - at the back of the sanctuary, which functioned as a gathering area for the members of the cult to participate in rituals. Next to the Ekklesiasterion was the sacrarium, which stored the temple's prized objects. Furthermore, statues of Isis are assumed to line the front of the temple with Roman deities along the long walls. The Temple of Isis was a significant aspect of life in Rome. It was in a central location near the Forum, theaters, wrestling school, and temples honoring gods, Asclepius and Neptune. Upon analysis of the remains of the temple, it is known that it was painted with a red and white color scheme throughout. The white paint was meant to emulate a stone-like appearance.

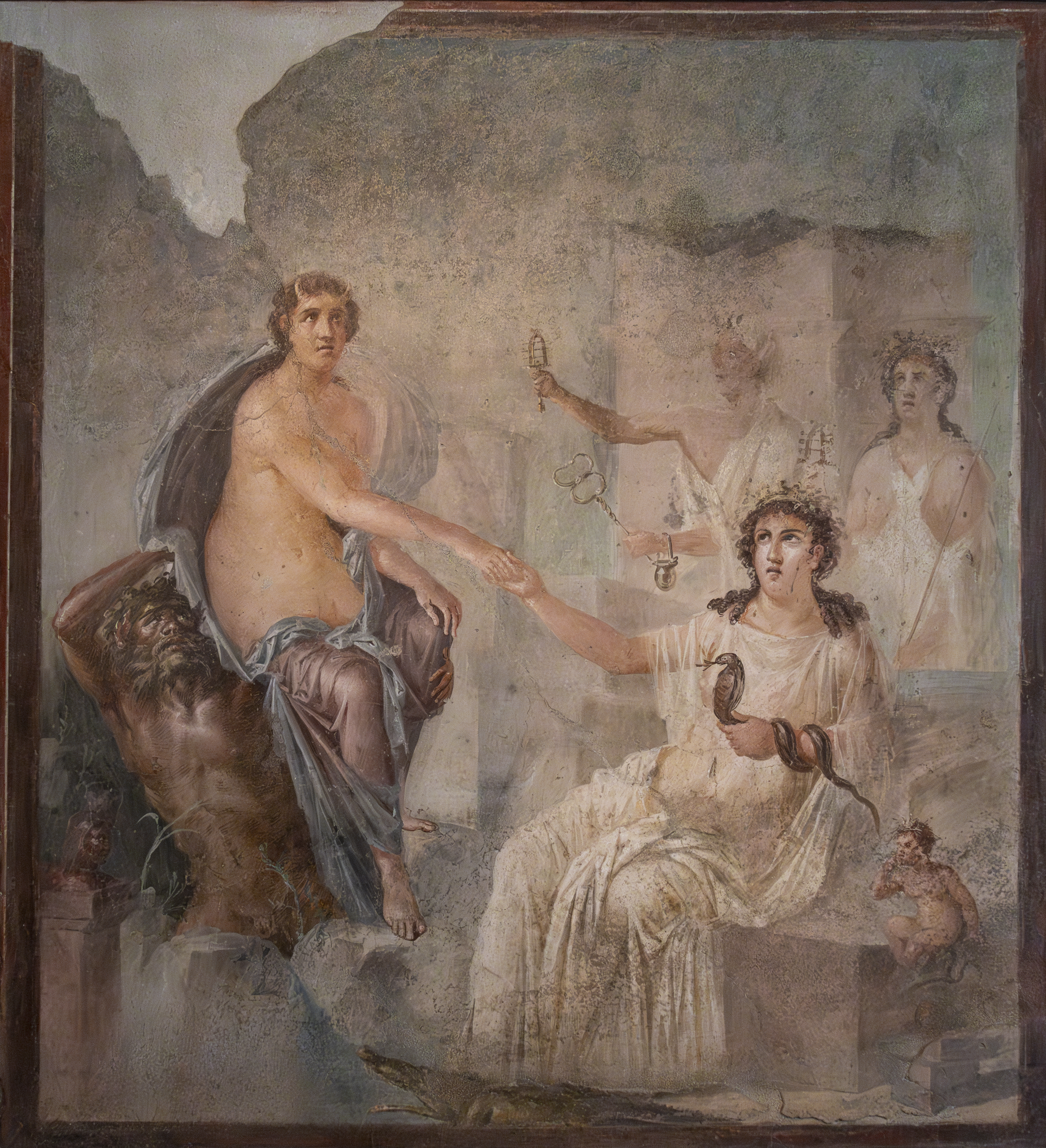
Fresco of Isis receiving Io at her sanctuary in Canopus; south wall of Ekklesiasterion.

== Temple art and iconography ==
Depictions of Isis in her temple are done in Hellenistic tradition, which means that Isis is depicted as being Roman, rather than Egyptian. This was likely done in an effort to assimilate her into Roman culture. However, art in the Egyptian style were still integrated into the temple. Walls in the temple were all beautifully painted. The frescoes in the Temple of Isis are thought to have been done in the First and Second Style of Pompeian painting, as was the artistic trend at the time. Wall paintings in this style possessed a lot of color, complex, and were representational and influenced by theater. However, when the temple was restored after the earthquake in 62 C.E., the paintings became done in the Fourth Style, which was illusionistic, eclectic, and was a combination of all Pompeian painting styles. After the restoration, the frescoes of Io were patronized by affluent Romans. In addition to the monochromatic floor mosaic, the walls of the Ekklesiasterion illustrated various mythological scenes. The Ekklesiasterion includes scenes of Io's arrival in Egypt and subsequent reception by Isis. In this fresco, Isis is depicted having a serpent around her wrist, and a crocodile at her feet. The north wall includes scenes with Io (mythology), Argos, and Hermes. This room itself appears to be the most formal with its role in ritual banquets as well as the reunion of initiates. The sacrarium is also heavily Egyptian influenced with a mural of snakes guarding a wicker basket adorned with lunar symbols. This may represent a spring sailing season celebration, navigium Isidis, since Isis restores her husband-brother to life by towing a boat filled with sacred waters.

== Excavation ==
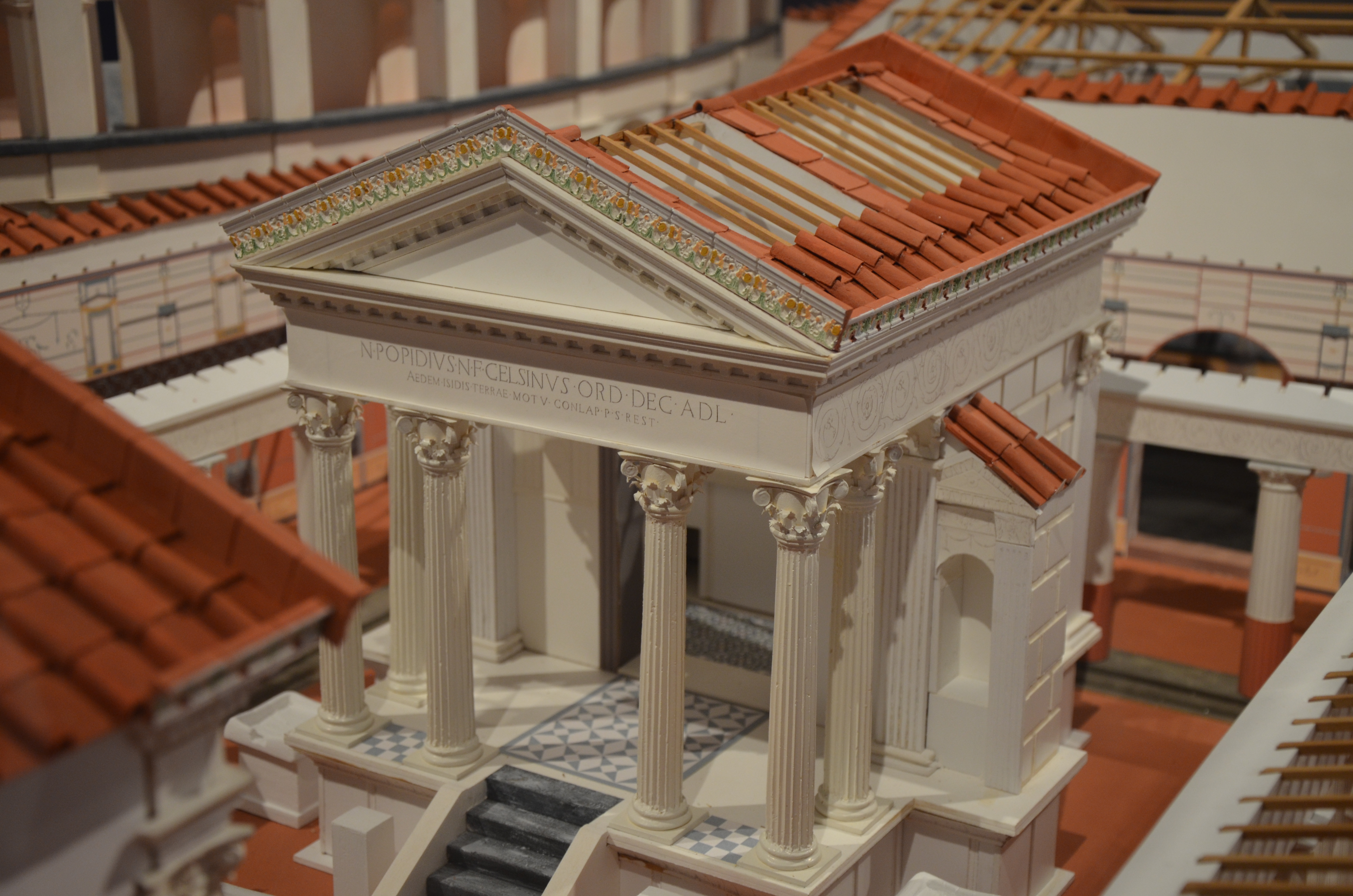
A model in the Naples National Archaeological Museum showing how the temple may have appeared.

The Temple of Isis sustained significant damage from the earthquake that affected Pompeii in the first century. Although early excavators of Pompeii found nearly all of the Forum's buildings in disrepair or even in shambles, they discovered that Temple of Isis had been fully restored at some time between 62 CE and the eruption of Mount Vesuvius in 79 CE. The speed of this particular rebuilding is consistent with suggestions that Isis held an important role in Pompeiian daily life, both religiously and politically. When the temple was excavated in 1764 by Karl Jakob Weber, many remnants of temple life were found. Fragments of statues and ritual materials were found scattered in various parts of the temple. The excavation in this area began in 1709 with Duc d'Elbeuf's unearthing of artifacts through well-digging in the area later identified as Herculaneum. The earliest excavations of the Roman towns in Campania - destroyed by the volcanic eruption of Mt. Vesuvius in 79 A.D. - are highlighted by the excavations between 1750 and 1764 and the work of Weber. He was a Swiss military engineer charged with the supervision of the excavations during the period by Roceque Joaquin de Alcubierre, chief director of the royal excavations from 1738 until his death in 1780. These early excavations faced many daunting tasks: the difficulties of excavating through tons of volcanic material in Resina to investigate Herculaneum, the problems of disturbing established and arable farmland to evacuate in Pompeii, and the resulting health hazards from long periods underground in damp conditions. During the extraction of this material, Weber's workers dug haphazardly around the site looking for valuable sculptural finds, back-filling immediately afterwards to prevent collapse. Although Weber, determined to produce accurate maps of the orientation of the villages and individual buildings, believed the newly discovered areas should be left exposed for public exhibition.

== Influence ==
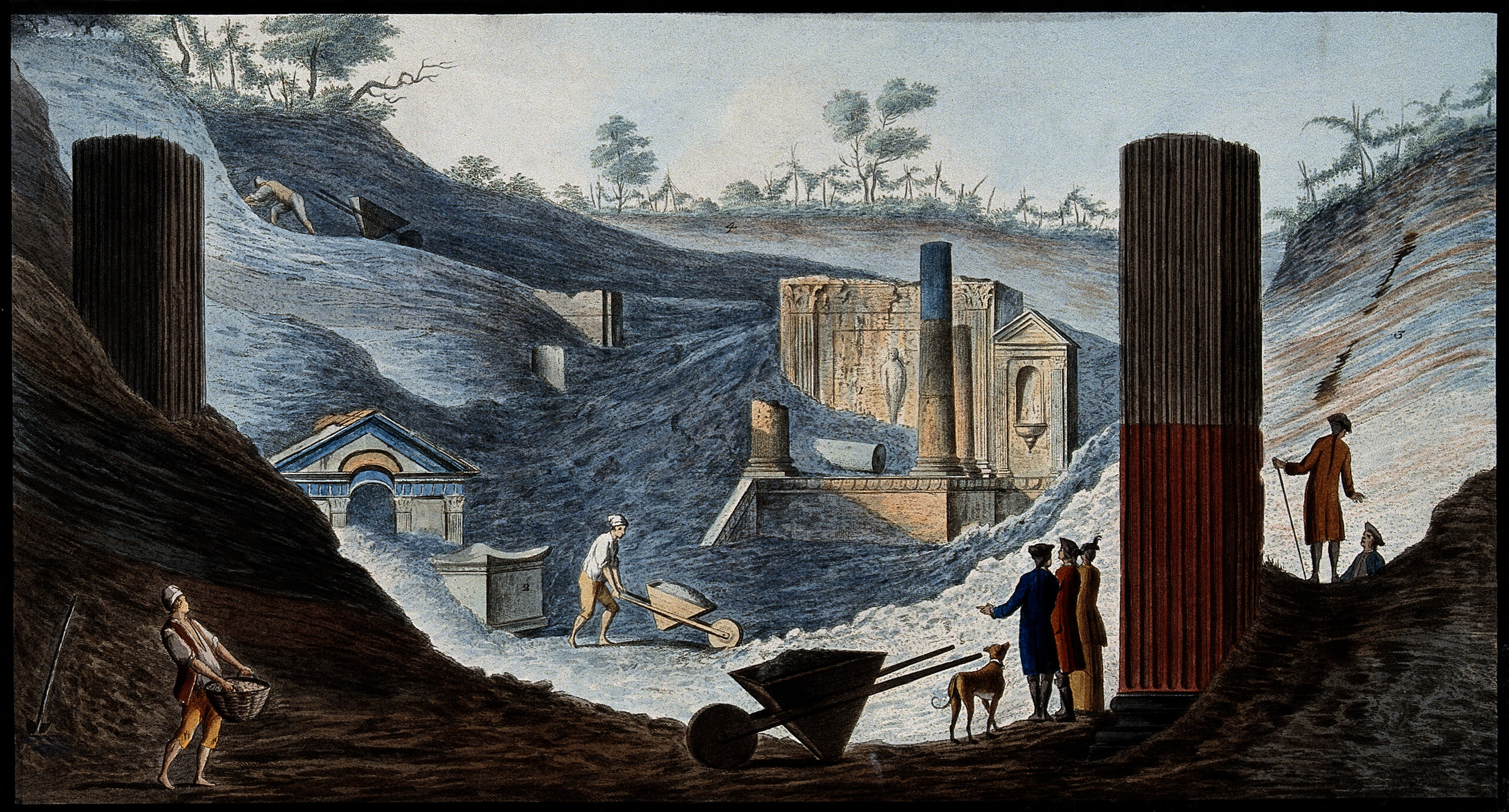
Etching with gouache by Pietro Fabris of the discovery of the Temple of Isis during the early Pompeii excavations (1776)

After its excavation, the Temple of Isis influenced the art world; it was the subject for many inspired artists. The famous composer Wolfgang Amadeus Mozart is known to have visited the Temple of Isis at Pompeii in 1769, just a few years after it was unearthed and when Mozart was himself just 13 years old. His visit and the memories of the site are considered to have inspired him 20 years later in his composition of The Magic Flute. The temple also inspired the backgrounds for The Magic Flute opera adaptation.

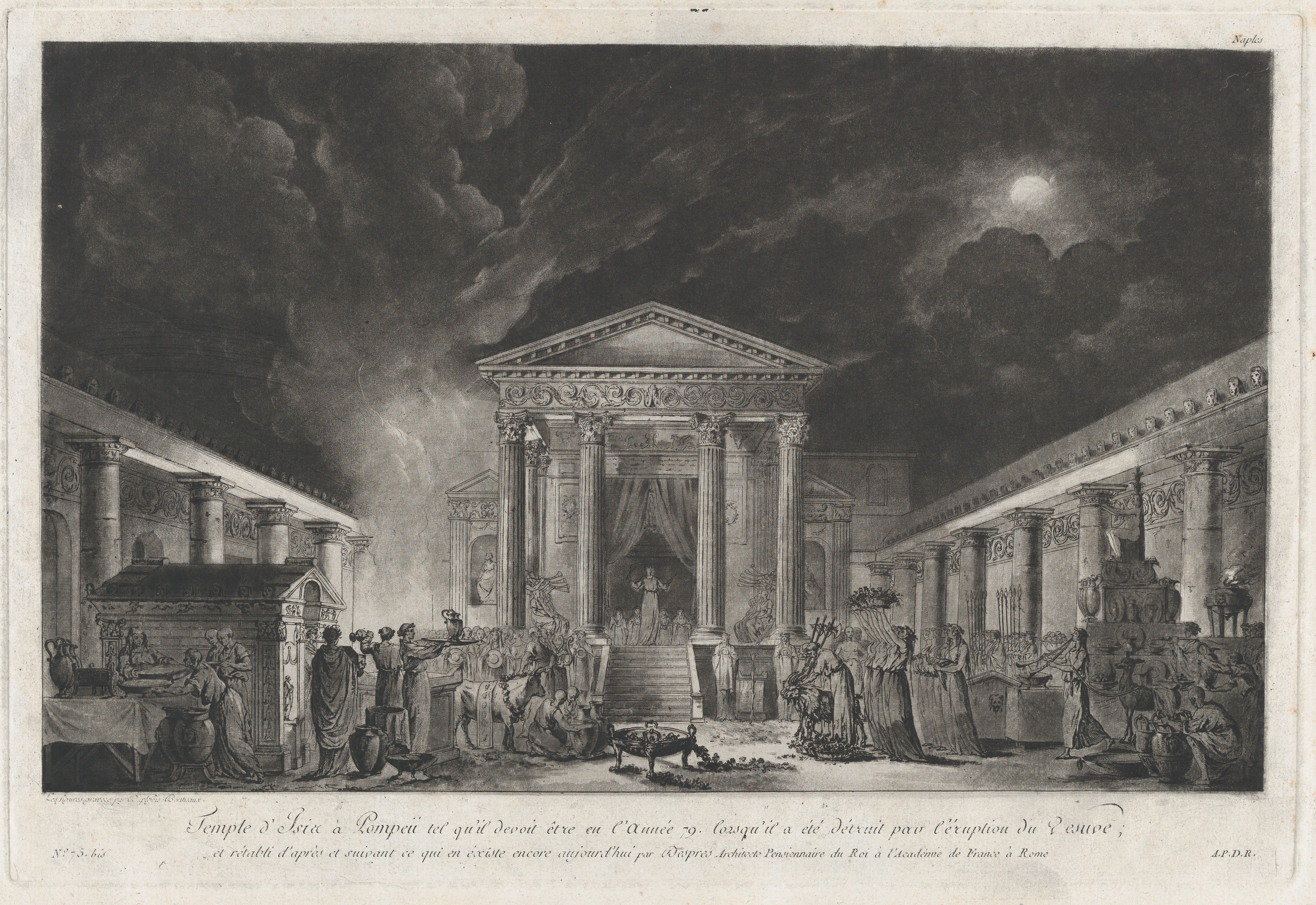
Illustration of the Temple of Isis from Jean Claude Richard de Saint Non's 1782 volume of Voyage Pottoresque, ou, Description desroyaumes de Naples et Sicile

In the 18th and early 19th centuries, the Temple of Isis in Pompeii served also as the subject of written depictions and illustrations, many of which romanticized and exoticized the Egyptian cult center. One particular book written by Giambattista Piranesi in 1804, Antiquités de Pompeìa, includes illustrations of Egyptian symbols which are not historically accurate to what has been excavated at Pompeii and depictions of the Temple of Isis at a much larger than factual scale. Another illustration of the Temple of Isis from Jean Claude Richard de Saint Non's 1782 volume of Voyage Pottoresque, ou, Description desroyaumes de Naples et Sicile also features a gross misrepresentation of the temple's size. Its intense shadowing and looming clouds only contribute to the Egyptomanian tendency to mystify and marginalize Egypt as it compares to post-Enlightenment European notions of religion. Photographs of the temple's ruins, taken by archeologists and compiled in the "Pompeii in Pictures" webpage demonstrate the disparity in size between these illustrations and the physical space itself.
