= Navigium Isidis =

Annual ancient Roman religious festival in honor of the ancient Egyptian goddess Isis

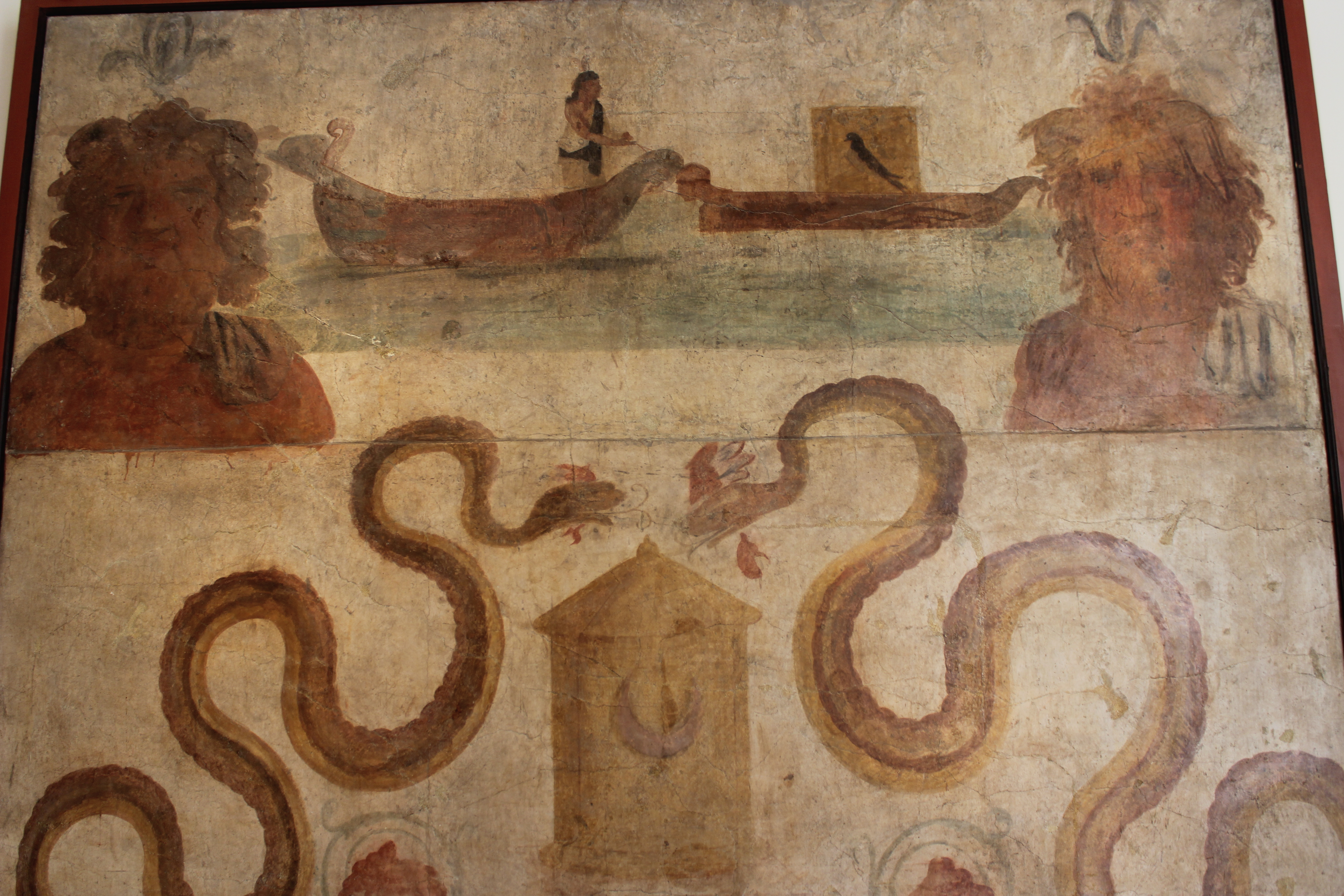
Fresco with the Navigium Isidis (Naples National Archaeological Museum)

The Navigium Isidis or Isidis Navigium (trans. the vessel of Isis) was an annual ancient Roman religious festival in honor of the goddess Isis, held on March 5. The festival outlived Christian persecution by Theodosius (391) and Arcadius' persecution against the Roman religion (395).

In the Roman Empire, it was still celebrated in Italy at least until the year 416. In Egypt, it was suppressed by Christian authorities in the 6th century.

The Navigium Isidis celebrated Isis' influence over the sea and served as a prayer for the safety of seafarers and, eventually, of the Roman people and their leaders. It consisted of an elaborate procession, including Isiac priests and devotees with a wide variety of costumes and sacred emblems, carrying a model ship from the local Isis temple to the sea or to a nearby river.

Modern carnival resembles the festival of the Navigium Isidis, and some scholars argue that they share the same origin (via carrus navalis, meaning naval wagon, i.e. float – later becoming car-nival). Many elements of Carnival were in turn appropriated in the Corpus Christi festival, most prominently in the Iberian Peninsula (Spain and Portugal).

== See also ==
- Mysteries of Isis
- Foreign influences on Pompeii
