= History of Constantinople =

Brief history of Constantinople from 330 to 1453

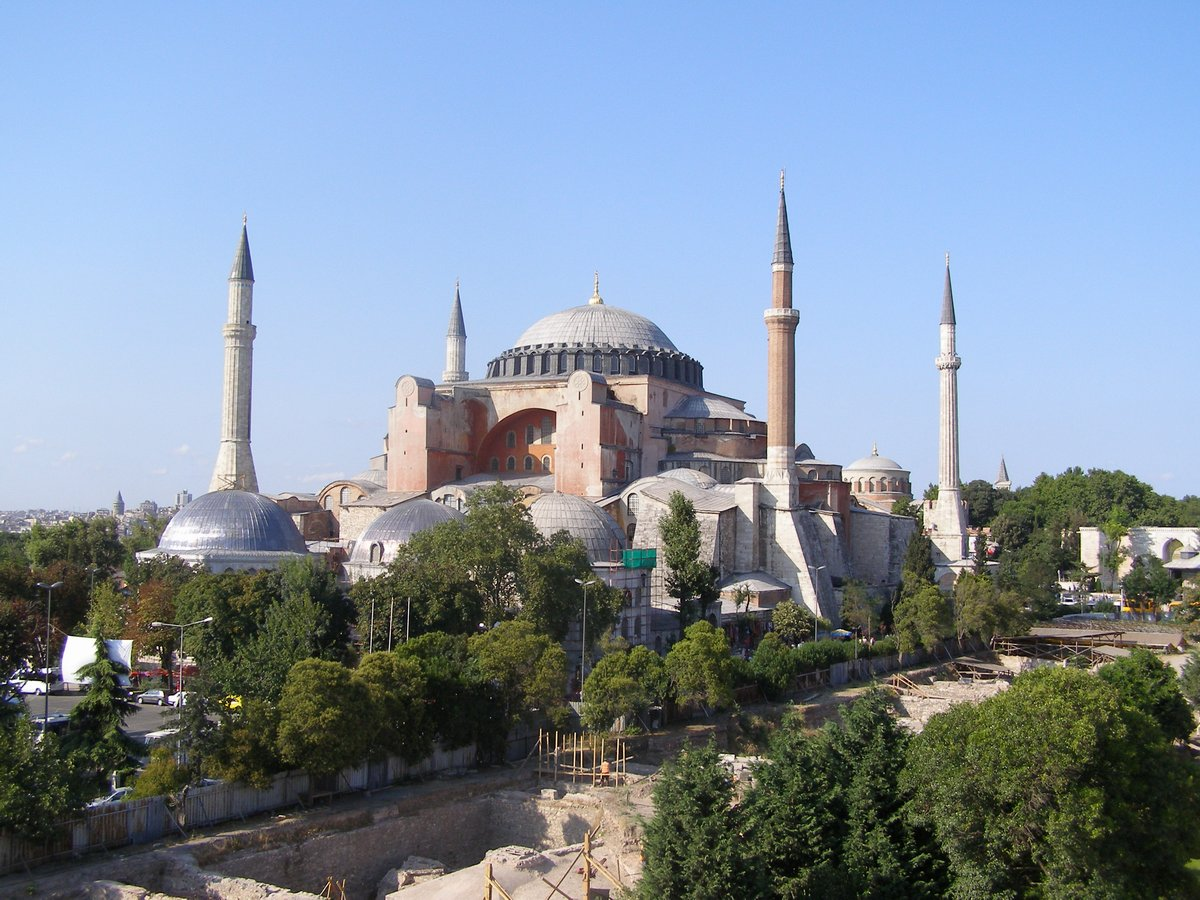
Hagia Sophia Cathedral — a symbol of Byzantine Constantinople

The history of Constantinople covers the period from the Consecration of the city in 330, when Constantinople became the new eastern capital of the Roman Empire, to its conquest by the Ottomans in 1453.

Constantinople was rebuilt on the site of Byzantium. Within half a century, thanks to the construction projects of the time, rapid population growth, development of trade and crafts, its status as a capital city, and the efforts of 4th century Roman emperors, Constantinople became one of the largest cities in Europe and the Middle East. The prosperous "megalopolis of the Middle Ages" became the largest political, cultural, and economic center of a vast empire, but it declined over time. After the fall of Rome in the 5th century, Constantinople became the capital of the Eastern Roman Empire for nearly a millennium, preserving a degree of Roman and Hellenistic tradition. (Note: The name of this state was "Empire of the Romans", the Latins called it "Romania" and the Ottomans — "The State of the Rums". The terms "Byzantium" and "Byzantine Empire" appeared after the fall of Constantinople.) The history of Constantinople in the Byzantine era was filled with popular uprisings and palace intrigues, assassinations of emperors and changes of ruling dynasties, months-long sieges and campaigns against western and eastern neighbors. Until the 8th century, Constantinople was the center of culture and science in medieval Europe.

A characteristic feature of political life in Constantinople was the constant struggle for power between different groups of the aristocracy, army, merchants, and clergy. The elite was an unstable and diverse group. Many nobles were proud that they had been able to work their way up from the bottom of society to the pinnacle of power. Moreover, even the imperial throne could be occupied by a commoner due to conspiracy, love affairs, marriage, military uprising or local rebellion. Emperors could be simple soldiers who worked their way up the ladder. In Constantinople, the contrast between the poverty of the common people and the wealth of the aristocracy, the imperial court, and the clergy was particularly striking. The city was seen as global center of both luxury and poverty.

The Fall of Constantinople in May 1453 marked the final collapse of Byzantium and the transformation of the Ottoman Empire into one of the most powerful states in the world. It sent shock waves throughout Christian Europe and jubilation at the courts of Cairo, Tunis, and Granada. In addition, the destruction of many Roman and Byzantine cultural treasures caused irreparable damage to European culture. In Europe, the image of the Turks became synonymous with all that was cruel and alien to Christianity.

== Constantine and his successors ==
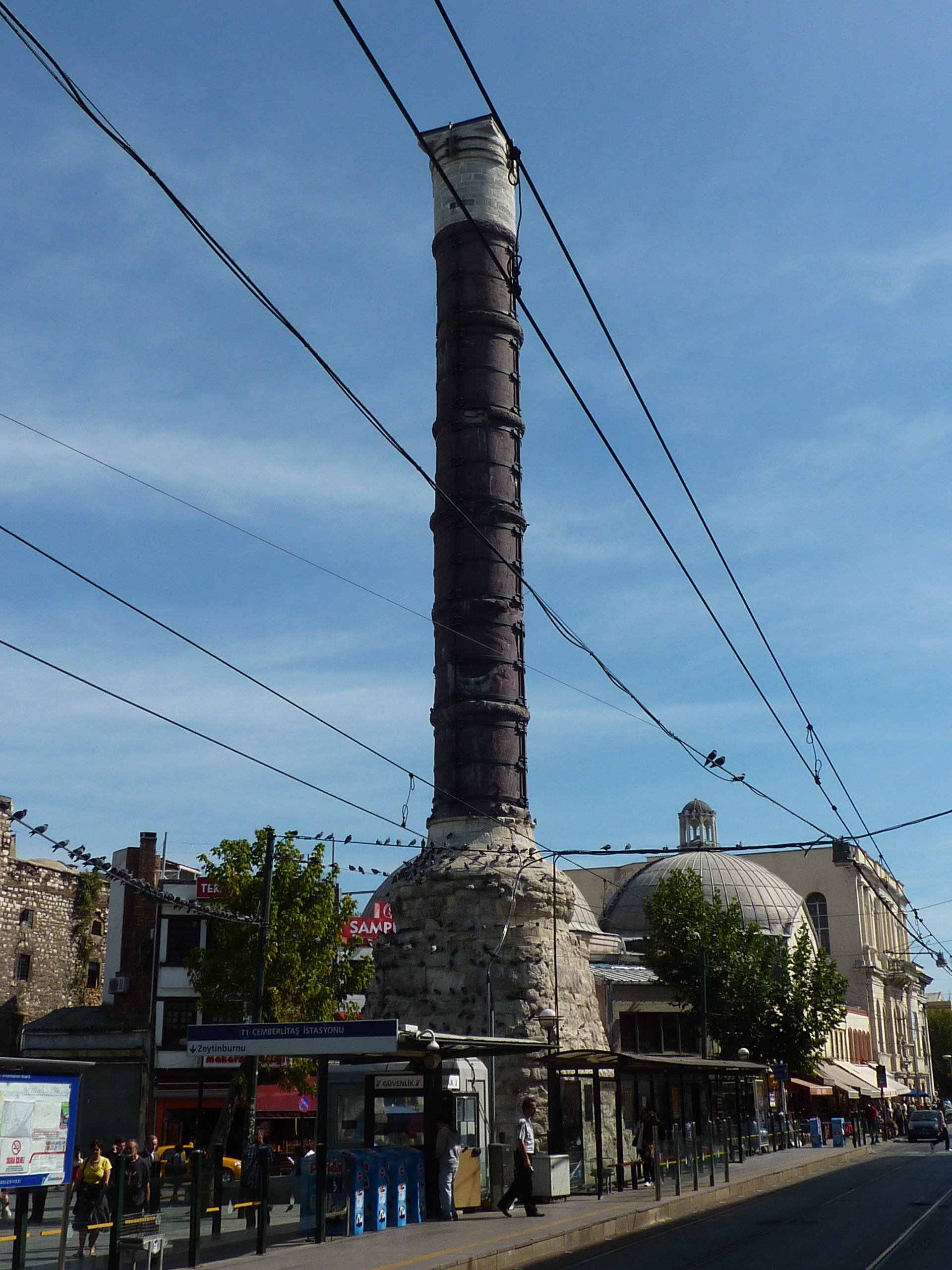
The Column of Constantine, erected in 330 A.D.

The Roman Emperor Constantine I the Great appreciated the advantageous location of Byzantium on the seaside, at the crossroads of Europe and Asia. Constantine's decision was also influenced by the turbulent situation in Rome itself: the discontent of the nobility and the constant struggle for the throne. The emperor wanted to crown his reforming activities with the creation of a new administrative center of great power. The foundation of the city took place in the fall of 324, and Constantine personally decided to mark its boundaries. (Note: According to legend, Constantine took a spear in his hand and led a solemn procession around the circle that marked the ring of the future city walls. A considerable part of the hilly area of the Bosphorus promontory fell within the city limits, and the emperor's cronies remarked that the new capital would be too large. To this, Constantine, confident that his actions at that moment were guided by a higher power, replied that he would "go until someone in front of me stops".) The area he demarcated was surrounded by an earthen wall, within which a large building was constructed. By Constantine's order, famous architects, painters and sculptors, the best masons, plasterers and carpenters were brought to Byzantium and exempted from other state duties. Another of his laws, designed to speed up the construction of the capital, obliged all owners of real estate in the cities of Pontus Euxine to acquire at least one house in Byzantium (only when this condition was met could the owners bequeath their property to their heirs).

Constantine encouraged the settlement of the new city from various provinces of the Roman Empire in various ways, granting them special conditions and benefits, and many imperial dignitaries were forcibly transferred here. (Note: According to the legend, the emperor sent the nobles who did not want to move to Byzantium on a campaign against Persia, taking the rings with the name seals from all of them. The families of these nobles were then sent sealed letters with instructions to move to Byzantium. While the letters reached their addressees and the families were on their way, Constantine ordered the construction of houses for each nobleman, which were exact copies of their Roman dwellings. When the dignitaries and generals returned from the campaign, their families were waiting for them in Byzantium in new houses that did not differ from the previous ones.) Constantine established the rule that all settlers who purchased property in the new capital were entitled to free grain, oil, wine, and firewood. This so-called "food bonus" lasted for about half a century and played a major role in the influx of artisans, sailors, and fishermen into Byzantium. In addition to attracting human resources, Constantine also provided for the decoration of the city, for which magnificent works of art were brought to Byzantium from all corners of the vast empire — from Rome and Athens, Corinth and Delphi, Ephesus and Antioch.

On May 11, 330, a grand ceremony was held to inaugurate the capital of the Roman Empire, called New Rome (the text of the imperial edict issued on the same day was carved on a marble column). (Note: Since then, residents have celebrated the city's founding day every year on May 11.) The main celebrations took place in the horse racing and included performances by artists and sporting events, including the chariot races favored by the people. During these celebrations, the Christian clergy, as well as the still influential pagan priesthood among the representatives of the Greek colleges, became more prominent in Constantine the Great's retinue. Although Christianity was becoming the dominant religion, the emperor, and himself did not immediately break with the old traditions, (Note: Constantine was not officially baptized until his deathbed by Bishop Eusebius of Nicomedia.) did not hinder the activities of the priests (however, during his reign, many pagan temples of ancient Byzantium were converted into churches and public buildings). On the occasion of the consecration of the new capital, a coin was minted depicting Constantine in a battle helmet with a spear in his hand. In honor of the city's patroness, the mother of God, a stele of red porphyry on a white marble base was erected. (Note: This monument was especially honored by Constantine, and whenever the whole imperial retinue passed it, they dismounted from their horses.) However, the name "New Rome" did not catch on, and soon the capital was called Constantinople — the city of Constantine.

During Constantine's reign, Hagia Sophia, Hagia Irene, Saint Agathius's Church on the Golden Horn and Saint Mocius's Church outside the city walls were built. Along with the first churches in Constantinople, the impressive Temple of Fortuna was built, several sanctuaries were renovated, and the huge column brought from the Roman Temple of Apollo was erected, crowned with a statue of Constantine himself in the image of Apollo (or Helios) greeting the rising sun. (Note: The emperor's shield and sword, as well as various Christian relics, were embedded in the base of the column. At the end of the 11th century, a lightning strike destroyed the statue and the upper part of the column.) From Delphi was brought a bronze "Serpent Column", which served as the foot of the famous golden tripod, and in Constantinople decorated the arena of the Hippodrome. (Note: During the Ottoman period, the three snake heads that adorned the column were chipped off. Today, one of them is kept in the Istanbul Archaeology Museum.) From Rome came the famous monument to the goddess Athena Pallada, which the Romans had removed from Athens in due time (its column was turned into a pedestal for statues representing Constantine and then his successors). In the city, to which the emperor gave the municipal structure of Rome, was established the Senate, henceforth here was one of the consuls. An impressive flow of Egyptian grain, previously used for the needs of the population of Rome, was diverted to Constantinople.

By the end of Constantine's reign, the new capital was spread over seven hills on the shores of the Bosphorus like Rome, (Note: In modern Istanbul, the first hill is Hagia Sofia, Sultanahmet Mosque and Topkapi Palace; the second hill is Nuruosmaniye Mosque, Grand Bazaar and Column of Constantine; on the third hill are the main buildings of Istanbul University; on the fourth is the Fatih Mosque, on the fifth is the Selim I Mosque; on the sixth is the Mihrimah Sultan Mosque and the Edirnekapı district, the seventh hill stretches from the Aksaray district to the Theodosius Walls.) there were built about 30 palaces and temples, more than four thousand significant residential buildings for the nobility, a hippodrome, a circus and two theaters, more than 150 baths, more than a hundred bakeries, eight aqueducts, and thousands of houses for the common people. North of the central square Augustaion, on the site of the acropolis of ancient Byzantium, was the Capitol, where pagan temples and shrines to various gods were preserved until the end of the 4th century. Under Constantine and his successors, who actively promoted local sailors and traders, Constantinople's navy grew in size, and the city regained its ancient Byzantine commercial glory.

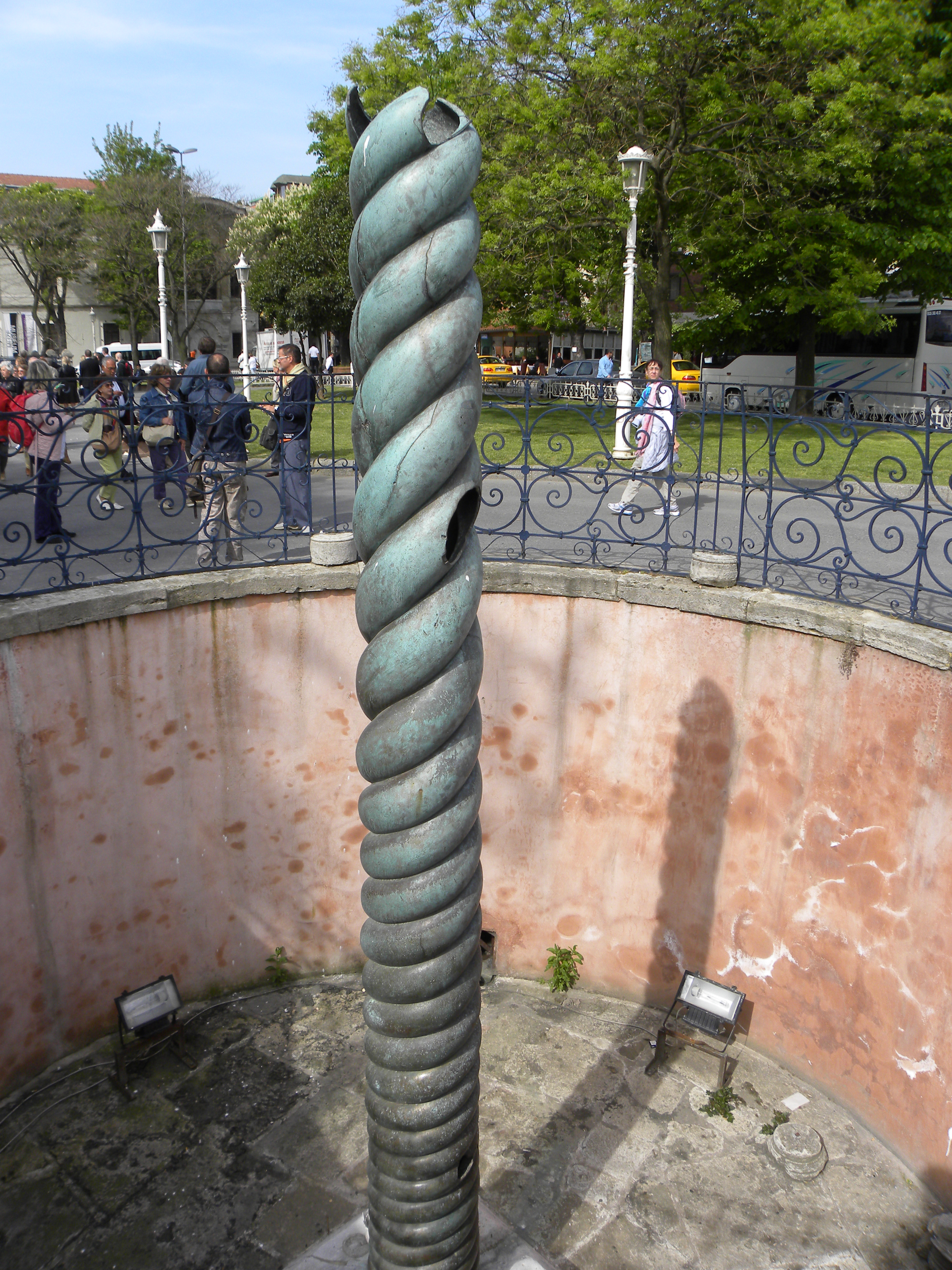
Serpent Column established at the racetrack

The process of destruction and decline of the Roman Empire intensified after the death of Constantine the Great in Nicomedia in 337. A desperate struggle for power broke out between Constantine's successors, one of the most dramatic episodes of which was a mutiny of the troops stationed in the capital, organized by Constantius II. He took advantage of the discontent in the Byzantine army over the uncertainty that had arisen after Constantine had bequeathed great power to his three sons (Constantius II, Constantine II, and Constans) and two nephews (Dalmatius the Younger and Hannibalian the Younger). A bloody massacre took place in Constantinople, during which many of the late emperor's relatives were killed, including his two favorite nephews (only Constantius Gallus and Julian, sons of also killed Flavius Julius Constantius, younger brother of Constantine the Great, could be saved). Constantius held power over the western part of the Roman Empire for more than a decade, but died in 350 in a battle with the usurper commander Magnus Magnentius. It was not until Constantius II's victory over Magnentius that the empire was restored under one emperor. In 357, the relics of the Apostle Andrew were solemnly transferred from Patras to the newly built Church of the Holy Apostles in Constantinople, where they were placed next to the relics of St. Luke, St. Timothy of Ephesus and the coffin of Constantine the Great (from the time of Constantine's burial until the 11th century, the Church of the Holy Apostles served as the tomb of Byzantine emperors). In 360 near the central square Augusteon was opened the temple, called by the people the Great, — the first predecessor of the modern Hagia Sophia Cathedral.

After the death of Constantius, who died in a Persians expedition, Julian entered Constantinople in December 361 and cruelly massacred the cronies of his predecessor. He began the restoration of paganism (for which he received the nickname Apostate), carried out a reform of school education, founded in the capital library, which for centuries became the most important center of Byzantine culture. But the reign of Julian was short-lived, he died in the summer of 363 during the Persian campaign, after which the troops proclaimed the new emperor Jovian. During the reign of the Constantinian dynasty in Constantinople lived and worked the physician Oribasius, the rhetorician Libanius, theologians and church hierarchs Alexander of Constantinople, Paul the Confessor, Eusebius of Nicomedia, Macedonius I, Eudoxius of Antioch, in the city visited Athanasius the Great, Basil the Great and the famous heresiarch Arius (died here in 336).

== Valentinian, Theodosius and their successors ==
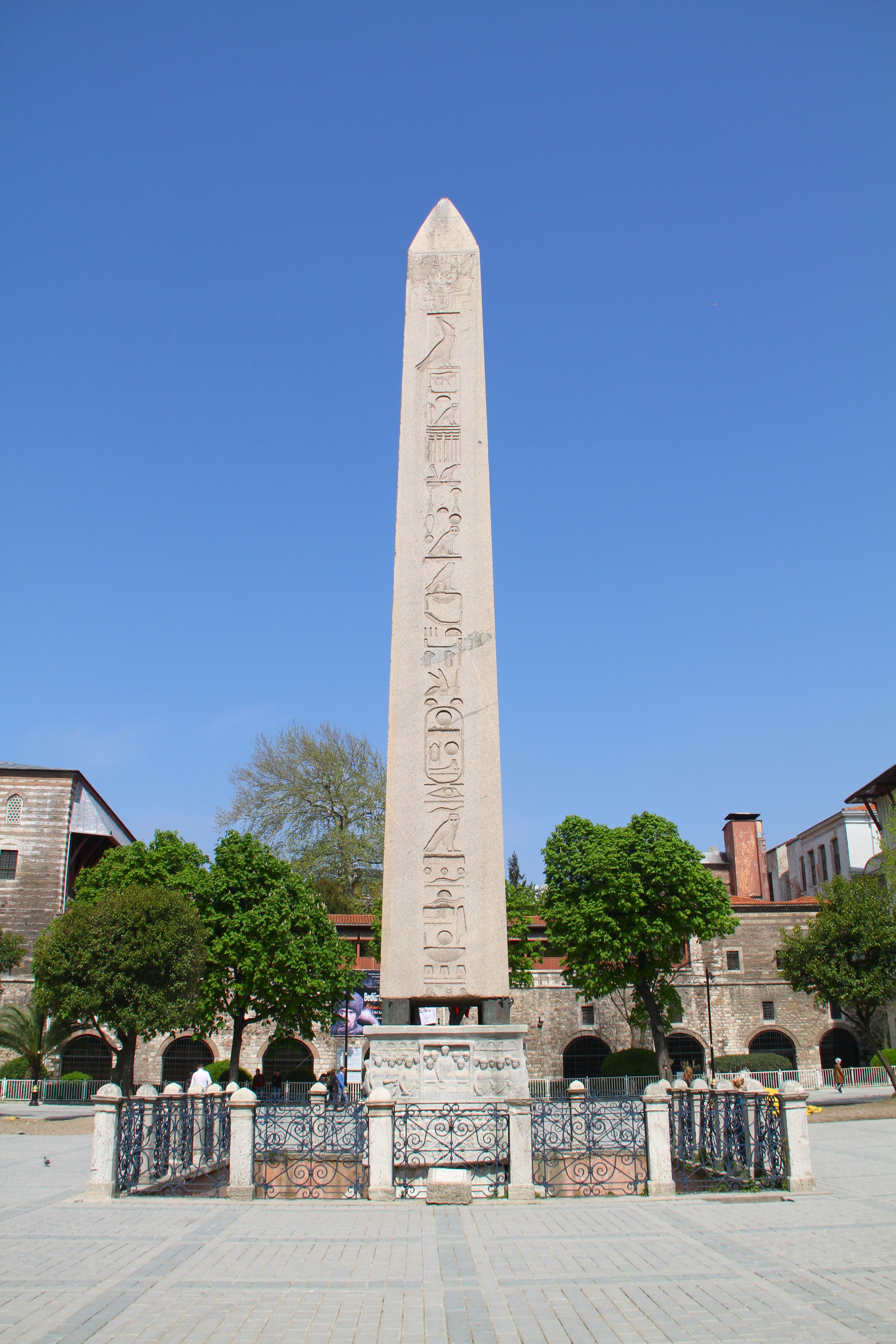
Obelisk of Theodosius, installed in 390 at the hippodrome

In 364, Roman troops proclaimed Valentinian I as the new emperor, who made his younger brother Valent II his co-emperor in the eastern part of the empire. During his reign, a two-tier aqueduct was completed that carried water between the hills and became part of a huge system that supplied Constantinople with water from Thrace. (Note: Most of Constantinople is built on rocky ground, and even the water in the wells is not fit for drinking. Therefore, one of the most important tasks of the city authorities was to supply fresh water to the numerous underground cisterns and wells. For this purpose, stone canals, pipelines, and aqueducts were built, bringing water from specially created lakes in the mountains of Thrace or from the large reservoirs of the Belgrad Forest.) In 378, in the Battle of Adrianople, the Romans suffered a terrible defeat by the Transdanian Goths; 40 thousand Roman soldiers, including Emperor Valentus, remained on the battlefield. Gratian appointed as emperor of the eastern part of the Roman Empire the experienced commander Theodosius, who had expelled the Goths from Constantinople, having concluded peace with them. Theodosius, with the help of bribes, luxurious receptions in the imperial palace, and appointments to high posts in the army, managed to win over even some Gothic leaders and commanders. It was then that military settlements of Goths, who served in the city guard, arose in Constantinople. (Note: Theodosius did not allow them to settle within the city walls (first, he did not trust them completely, and second, the Goths remained loyal to Arianism), so the new settlers were called Exokionites, meaning "living on the other side of the column" (referring to Constantine's column, symbolizing the central part of Constantinople), and the area of their settlement — Exokionium. However, although the Goths lived outside the walls, Emperor Theodosius was largely dependent on their military units.)

In 381 the First Council of Constantinople condemned Arianism and established the status of the Bishop of Constantinople, who became second in status to the Bishop of Rome (previously, since the suppression of the emperor Septimius Severus, the capital had been under the jurisdiction of the Metropolitan of Heraclea). In 390 an Egyptian granite obelisk, taken from Heliopolis, was erected on the Hippodrome of Constantinople. (Note: It was erected during the reign of Pharaoh Thutmosis III. Then Emperor Theodosius, who wanted to immortalize his victory over the Goths and Scythians, ordered the obelisk to be taken to Constantinople via Alexandria.) In 394 Theodosius, who executed the usurper Eugenius, briefly united both parts of the Roman Empire under his authority, but after his death in 395 the united state was divided among Theodosius' sons: Flavius Arcadius received the East (Note: Includes the entire Balkan Peninsula, Asia Minor, the Aegean Islands, Crete, Cyprus, Syria, Palestine, Egypt, Cyrenaica, and fortresses in the Black Sea region.) and his brother Honorius the West. In the same year, 395, Visigoths under the command of Alaric I again raised a revolt and, together with the Alemanni, Sarmatians, colonists, and slaves who joined them, invaded Thrace (separate detachments of rebels reached the walls of Constantinople, but then the entire mass of rebels moved on to Greece). By the end of the 4th century, more than 100 thousand people lived in Constantinople; new settlers did not have enough space within the fortress walls built by Emperor Constantine, and the city began to spread beyond them (in the coastal part of the city, houses were even built on stilts).

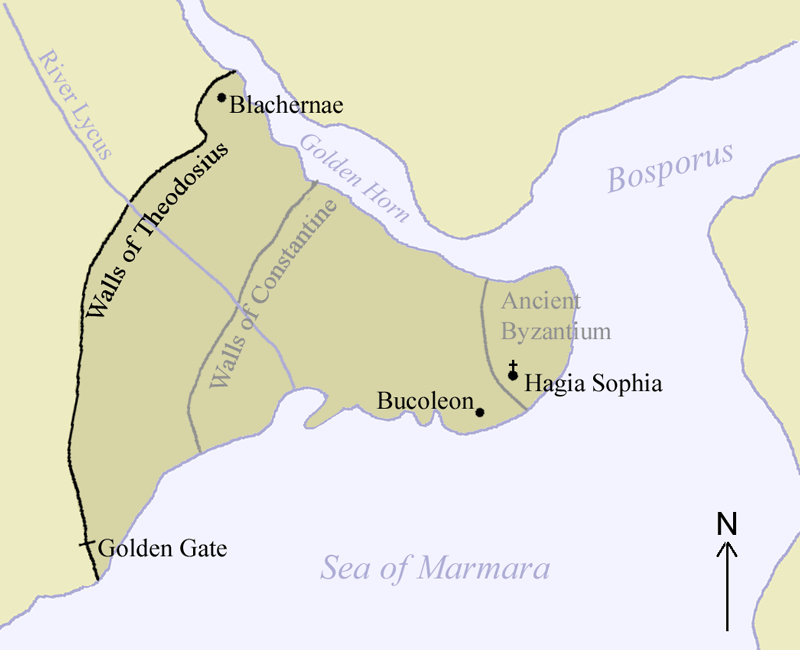
Constantinople's walls (in the middle)

In the second half of the 4th century, the great philosophers Themistius and Synesius of Cyrene worked in Constantinople, as did the theologians Gregory the Theologian, John Chrysostom, and Nilus of Sinai. In 404 there were riots in the city, caused by the removal from office of the popular Archbishop of Constantinople John Chrysostom, who had conflicted with the wife of the emperor Eudoxia (during the riots and the fires that swept the capital, even the Hagia Sophia burned). At the beginning of the 5th century (especially after 410), in connection with the threat of barbarian invasion, the flow of aristocratic settlers from Rome to Constantinople intensified. An earthquake in 412 largely destroyed the walls from the time of Constantine the Great, creating an urgent need for a new ring of fortifications that would cover the sprawling neighborhoods of the city. The new walls, begun under Emperor Arcadius, were completed during the reign of Emperor Theodosius II by the prefect Anthemius. The Wall of Theodosius had nine main gates, divided into civil and military, and many smaller passages (the most important gates, through which the busy trade routes passed, were the Golden Gate, (Note: They were built in the form of a gilded triumphal arch with three spans, the central one for the imperial cortege, and decorated with marble and bronze statues, including Hercules and Prometheus.) the Resios Gate, the Gate of St. Romanus, and the Charisian Gate). Bridges over the moat led to the civil gates, which were walled up during sieges. The military gates were protected by the highest and most powerful towers; their double iron gates were locked in peacetime, and during sieges they were used for sorties against the enemy.

The total length of the walls of Constantinople was 16 kilometers, and there were about four hundred towers along its perimeter. Theodosius' walls, which crossed the Bosphorus cape from the Sea of Marmara to the Golden Horn Bay, reached a length of 5.5 kilometers and were the most powerful. These walls were built in three rows (taking into account the fortifications completed later, after the devastating earthquake of 447). The first row of walls, 5 m high, protected a deep and wide moat with water (it was 20 m wide and in some places up to 10 m deep). The second row, 2–3 m wide and 10 m high, was reinforced by 15 m high towers. The third row, the most massive, was 6–7 meters thick and protected by towers 20 to 40 meters high. The towers were equipped with devices for throwing stones and pouring hot tar or oil on the enemy. Along the wall there were guardhouses for the guards and small stores of provisions and ammunition. The bases of the walls of Theodosius went 10–20 meters underground, which practically excluded the possibility of undermining. There were no fixed stone bridges across the moat, only light wooden ones, which were removed at night and quickly destroyed by the city's defenders during a siege.

The line of Theodosius' walls defined for centuries the boundaries within which Constantinople developed (the western suburbs of Eudom, Pigi, Philopateon, Blachernae, and Kosmidion remained outside the walls). Further growth of the city already occurred at the expense of the creation of suburbs on the northern coast of the Golden Horn (around Galata) and on the Asian coast of the Bosphorus, opposite the Bosphorus cape (around Chalcedon and Chrysopolis). In October 415 Theodosius II finished the delayed restoration of the Hagia Sophia Cathedral; in 421 he erected near the walls of Constantine, in the center of the square, a column with the statue of his predecessor — Emperor Arcadius, after which the square began to be named Forum Arcadius. In 425 the emperor opened a public school on the Capitol, which laid the foundation for the University of Constantinople (where the best rhetors, grammarians, sophists, and professors of the time taught young people Latin and Greek diction, medicine, philosophy, rhetoric, and law), then not far from the Hippodrome built the underground cistern of Theodosius. The sister of Theodosius II founded the Convent of St. Andrew, which later became the Monastery of St. Andrew of Crete. Under the strong influence of the clergy, Theodosius II forbade Jews to build new synagogues, to hold positions in the state apparatus, and to keep Christians as servants in their homes, which greatly reduced the Jewish community of Constantinople. A quarter of a century after the walls of Theodosius were built, a wall was built along the seashore, also reinforced with towers (it was known as the Wall of Propontis, or the Marmara Sea Wall). Theodosius' wall, the fortified old wall of Constantine, and the newest wall protecting the city from the sea formed a powerful defensive belt that was difficult to overcome even with the most advanced siege equipment.

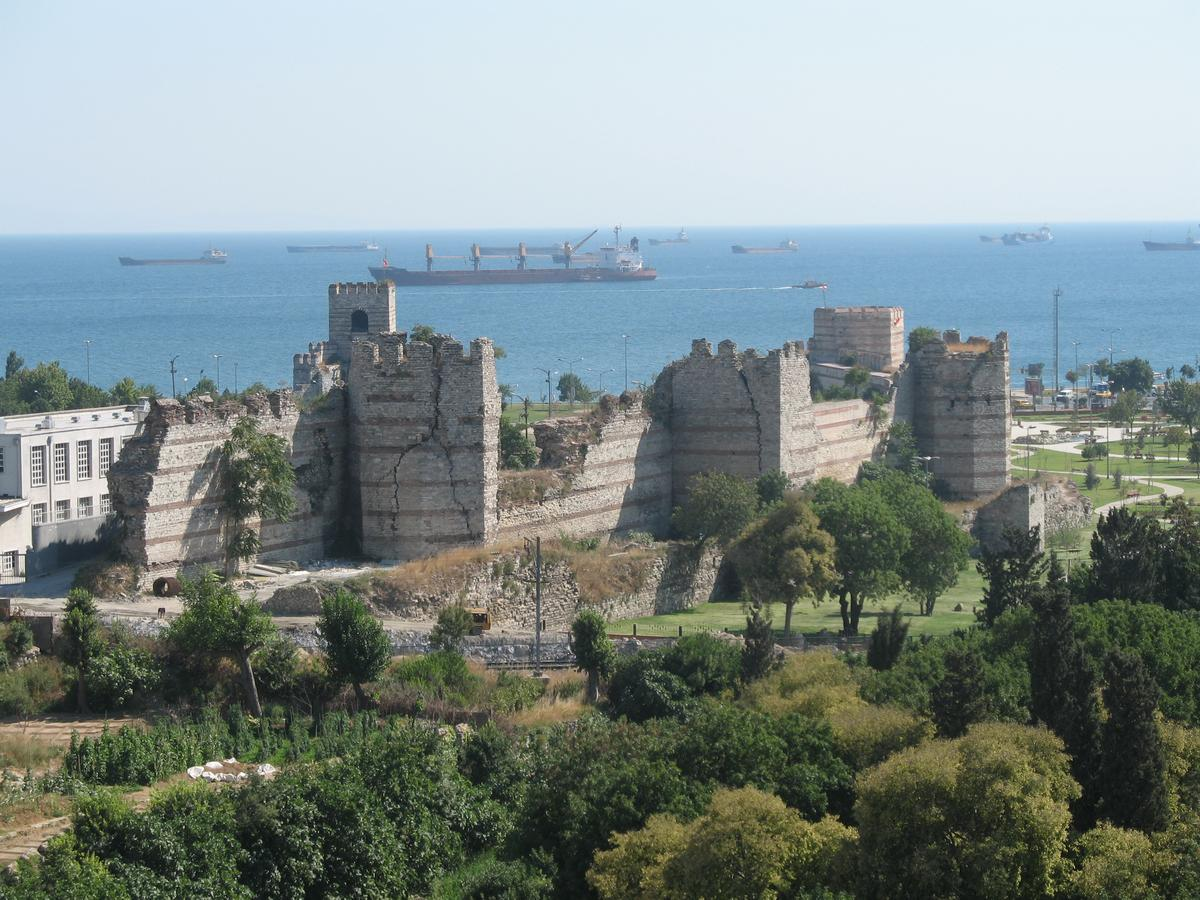
Seaside walls section

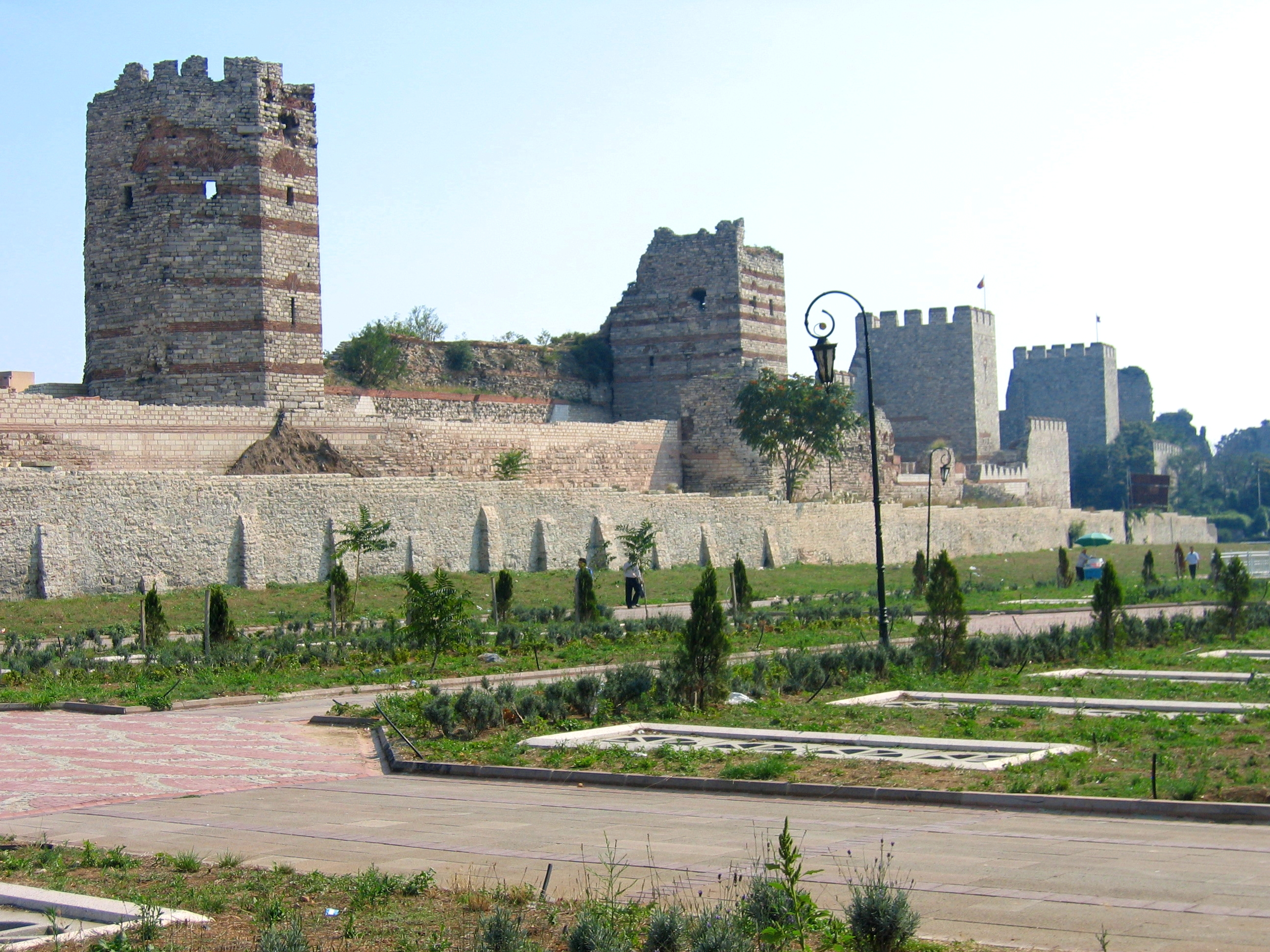
Theodosius Walls

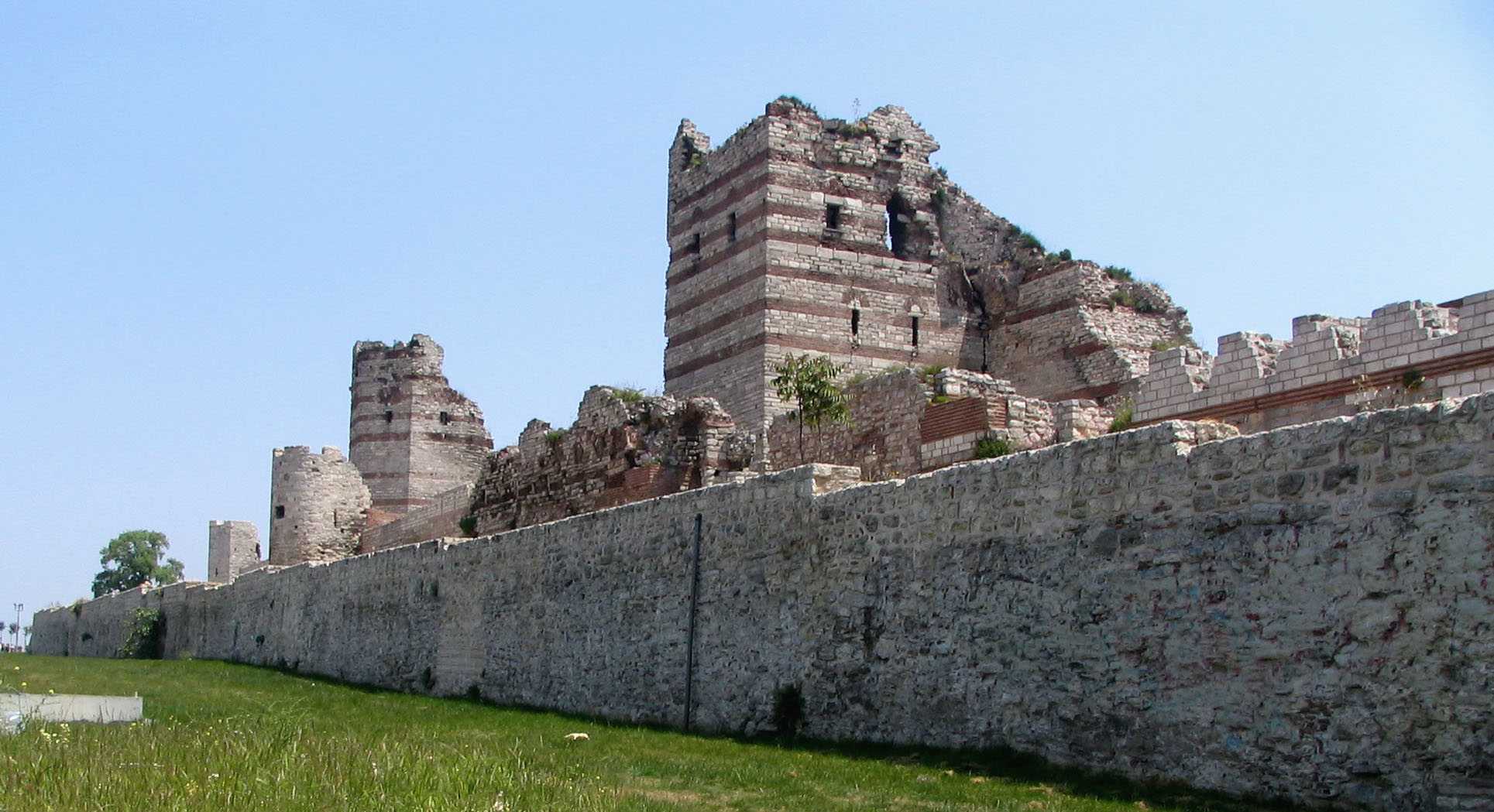
Theodosius Walls

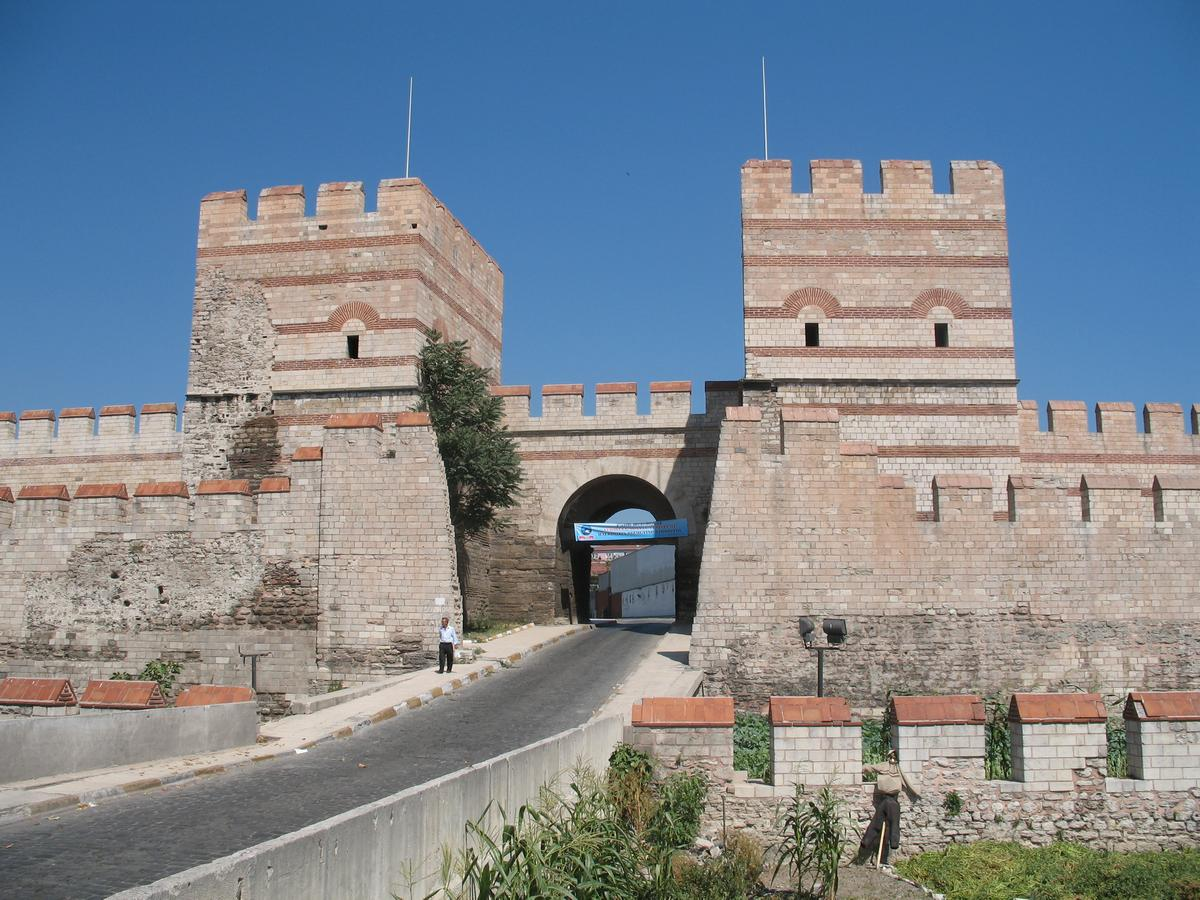
Second military gate

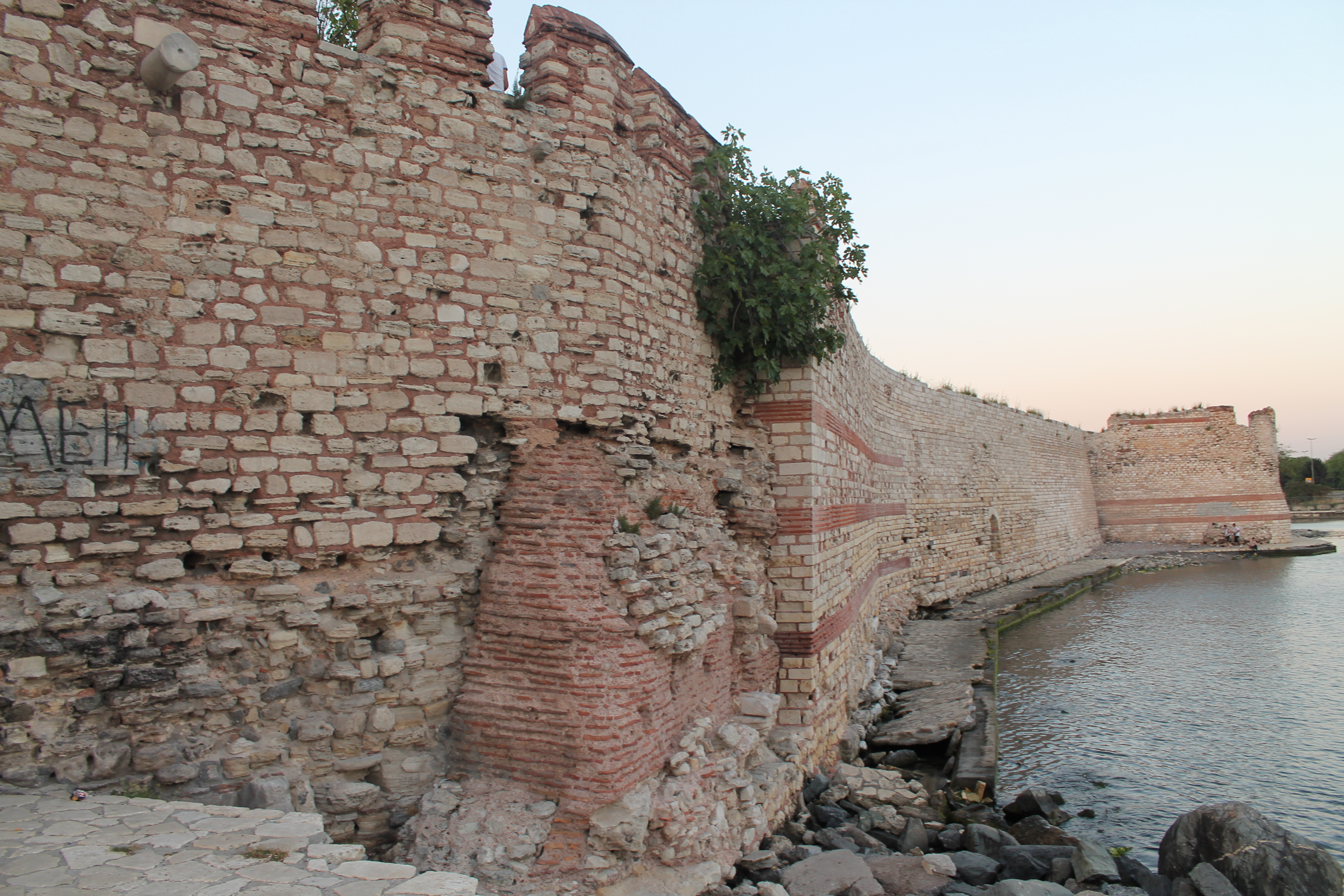
Seaside walls section

Around 425 Constantinople, like Rome, was divided into 14 neighborhoods (regions), each headed by a curator (regarch). At their disposal were the guardians of order and the night watch. Since the time of Constantine the Great, the eparch (in ancient Greek ὁ ἔπαρχος τῆς πόλεως) was the head of the entire city, responsible for the city's economy, beautification, administrative apparatus, maintenance of internal order, and security of the capital. Under Constantius II, the functions and rights of the Eparch of Constantinople were almost identical to those of the Prefect of Rome, and he had the power that made him the second person in the state after the emperor. He presided over the meetings of the Senate and distributed grain, had the right to arrest, imprison, or expel from the city any person who in his opinion posed a danger to the well-being of Constantinople (and could also limit a citizen's right of residence to a certain place). The eparch was subordinate to numerous collegia and state institutions, such as the city police, the prison (located in the basement of the Praetorium, in front of the Forum of Constantine), and the judicial institutions of all 14 quarters; he supervised the investigation of all criminal offenses committed in the city. (Note: Eparchus was the main person in the investigation of conspiracies against the emperor, tried and punished the participants and instigators of riots against the government.)

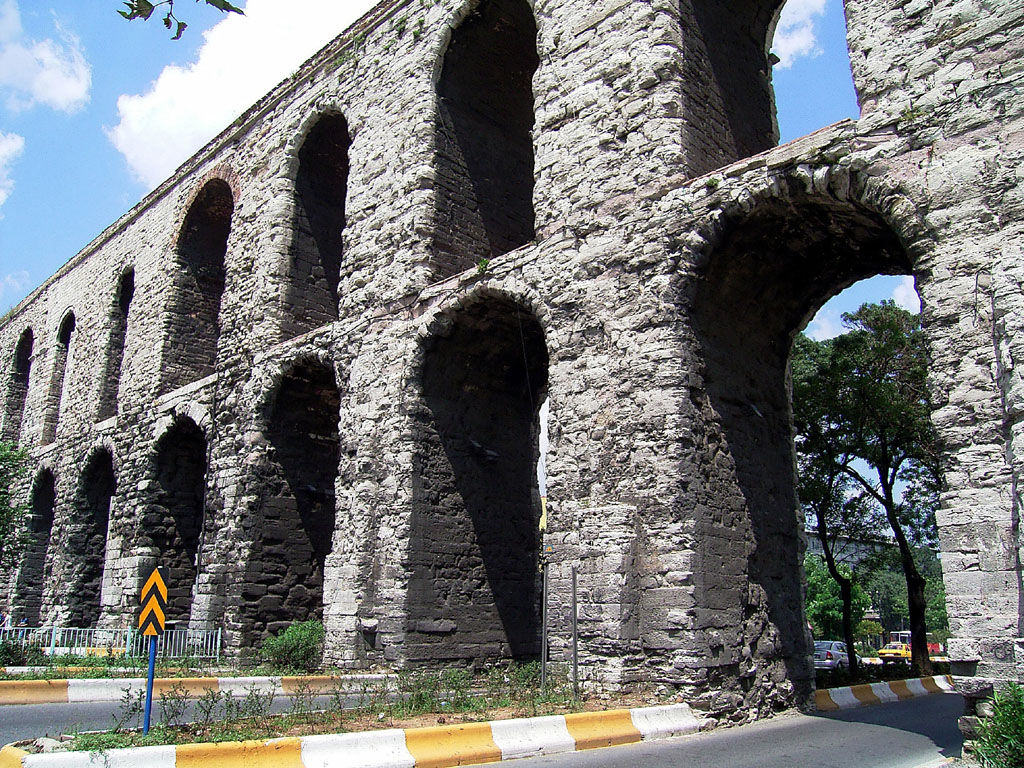
The Aqueduct of Valens was an important part of the public utilities of Constantinople

On the will of the Eparch of Constantinople depended the life and destiny of every citizen, so his office was constantly besieged by numerous petitioners and complainants, who begged for pardon for loved ones, tried to obtain orders from the authorities for the construction or repair of city facilities, and demanded the settlement of disputes between artisan corporations. The eparch's office was also responsible for organizing theatrical performances, preparing the city for religious festivals, parades of imperial processions, and ceremonial meetings of noble guests and foreign ambassadors. (Note: On these days, the workers cleaned the main streets and squares, decorated them with flowers and green branches (the way of the imperial convoy was covered with petals), and decorated the front halls of the palace with expensive fabrics and gold and silver jewelry.) The eparch was one of the key figures of various celebrations and ceremonies at the imperial court, and the rite of his appointment always took place in the palace in the presence of all the courtiers and the city's nobility. Then the new eparch delivered a speech to the representatives of all the city estates and associations; from the palace he went to the Hagia Sophia, and from there to his department. The citizens were not indifferent to the emperor's choice, and if the choice fell on an unpopular nobleman, the ceremony of the eparch's appointment often ended in mass riots among the demos. The most popular eparch of the period of the formation of Constantinople was Cyrus, who did much for the development and improvement of the city, but his popularity frightened Emperor Theodosius the Great, who removed Cyrus from his post and ordered him to be tonsured as a monk.

The handicraft production reached a great development. There were many imperial workshops (ergastiria) in Constantinople, which fulfilled the orders of the court, the army and the city authorities. Artisans were bound to these workshops for life, and this duty was hereditary. In addition, a significant portion of the workshop workers were slaves. There were also many private, municipal or church workshops, as well as workshops owned by nobles, monasteries and almshouses (the last three categories of owners preferred not to manage the enterprises directly, but to rent them out). These workshops employed free artisans who were organized into companies whose activities were strictly regulated by special statutes (they were obliged to pay taxes and, if necessary, to serve the state). Throughout the Middle Ages, Constantinople was a kind of "workshop of splendor" for the countries of Europe and the East. In many cities and at almost all courts, silk and wool fabrics, expensive clothes, leather, ceramics and glassware, jewelry and church ornaments, cold weapons and military ammunition (especially belonging to the category of luxury goods) were widely known. Merchants were also organized into corporations, and their activities were supervised by the state (private international trade was dominated by Syrian and Egyptian merchants). Many branches of trade were imperial monopolies, and it was common for the authorities to outsource them. The Eparchy regulated the number and duties of the members of the companies, their internal organization, but especially strict officials controlled the trading companies that supplied Constantinople with food.

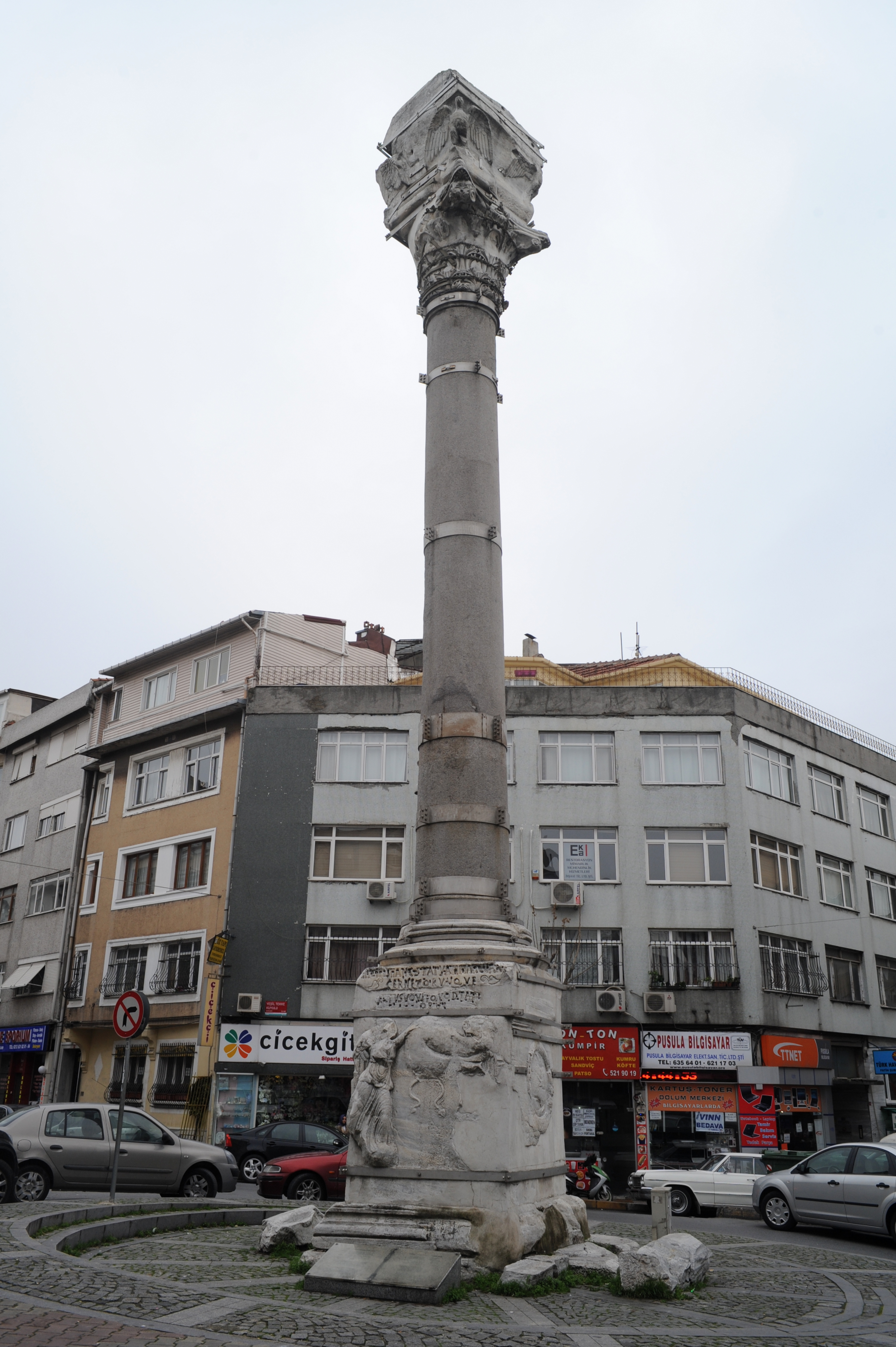
The Column of Marcian, erected in the middle of the 5th century

A very large segment of the Constantinople population was the urban plebeians, which included not only hired workers and petty servants, but also the poor, interrupted by casual earnings, as well as various declassed elements: beggars, prostitutes, cripples, and fools. Many of them had no shelter, were often hungry, and after earning a little money — got drunk in numerous cheap taverns. (Note: Tavern owners were forbidden to open their taverns on holidays and Sundays before two o'clock in the afternoon. All taverns were closed at night so as not to tempt drinkers.) The government regularly rewarded the plebs with gifts — on the occasion of celebrations in the name of the emperor the poor were given money, bread and wine, the bishop of Constantinople distributed alms, sometimes the plebs had the opportunity to see performances of magicians, trainers and acrobats at the hippodrome. However, in spite of such "care", the plebs were extremely volatile and easily rebelled for reasons that included an increase in the price of bread, sympathy for a disgraced nobleman, and a fiery speech by another pretender to the imperial throne.

In January 447, as a result of a strong earthquake in Constantinople, many buildings were destroyed and the fortress walls were seriously damaged. About 16 thousand people spent two months not only restoring the old fortifications but also building an outer wall with a number of towers and an embankment, as well as deepening the protective moat lined with bricks. As a result, the city was covered from the land side by a tiered defense system reinforced by 192 towers. In the spring of the same year, Attila's troops approached the city from Thrace, which caused panic and mass flight of the citizens, but the Huns did not dare to storm the city and went to Greece. From the middle of the 5th century, the archbishops of Constantinople began to bear the title of patriarch. In 451, under the supervision of imperial officials, the Fourth Ecumenical Council was held at Chalcedon, on the Asian shore of the Bosphorus, which condemned Monophysitism and laid the foundations of the doctrine of Eastern Orthodoxy. In 453 the Church of the Virgin Mary was built in the suburb of Blachernae outside the walls of Theodosius (it was founded by Pulcheria, the wife of Emperor Marcian). In the early years of the reign of Emperor Leo I, two Byzantine patricians, during a pilgrimage to Palestine, stole a robe of the Virgin, which was placed in the church of Blachernae. Later, clothes and part of a belt from the opened tomb of the Mother of God were also transferred here. Above the tablet of Marcian also stands the column of his name, erected by the governor of Constantinople in the middle of the 5th century (earlier the column was crowned by the statue of the emperor, and the pedestal was richly decorated with bas-reliefs).

Throughout the early Middle Ages, Constantinople was a major cultural center, surpassing all the capitals of Western Europe. The flourishing trade and crafts, the highly educated state apparatus with its numerous bureaucracies, allowed elements of high ancient culture to be preserved. The extensive foreign relations of Byzantine merchants and diplomats led to the development of geography, astronomy, mathematics, rhetoric, and linguistics in Constantinople. The impressive trade and monetary turnover of the capital, along with frequent conflicts over transactions and inheritance, led to the development of civil law and legal education. The presence in Constantinople of the imperial court, numerous secular and ecclesiastical nobles, and other wealthy patrons and supporters of the arts contributed to the development of medicine, architecture, construction and closely related mechanics, as well as literature (especially poetry and hagiography), music, theater, arts and crafts (pottery, mosaics, and enamels), and the production of dyes (for painting and dyeing fabrics). A cadre of Byzantine historians (e.g., Priscus, Sozomenes, and Socrates Scholasticus) emerged from the court bureaucracy and high priests of the time. Despite the growing influence of the clergy on culture, Constantinople preserved secular education, based on its traditions from antiquity (in contrast to the countries of Western Europe, where the Church actually monopolized the remnants of education). The Church's struggle with various heretical currents, remnants of "paganism", and ancient traditions (especially in philosophy and theology) had a great influence on the science of the time.

== Leo and his successors ==
After the death of Marcian, Leo I Macella was placed on the imperial throne with the active support of the influential Gothic generals Aspar and Ardavur. The new emperor has built in a wood behind the city walls, near a healing source in area Piga church (later emperor Justinian I, cured by waters of a source, has built here more magnificent temple and male monastery of a life-bearing source, and his successors repeatedly expanded and decorated highly esteemed monastery). (Note: Legend has it that when the Turks conquered Constantinople, one of the monks was frying fish. When the bitter news was brought to him, he did not believe it and replied, "If it is true, then let the fish come to life. At these words, the fish jumped out of the frying pan into a neighboring pond. After that, the Turks named the monastery "Balikly", which means "Fishy", but soon they destroyed it completely.) In 463, near the shores of the Sea of Marmara, a church was built by the patrician Stoudios, which became the foundation of the Studian Monastery, one of the first monasteries of the city, which laid the foundation for the numerous and influential monasticism of Constantinople. Soon the monastery was settled by the Akimite ("awake" or "alert") monks, followers of Alexander of Constantinople, whose order played a decisive role in the confrontation with Monophysitism. In 471, by order of Leo I, who wanted to get rid of foreign influence, his former patrons —Aspar and his son Ardavur— were brutally killed in the imperial palace (in retaliation, one of Aspar's commanders attacked the palace, but the attack was repulsed by troops loyal to the emperor).

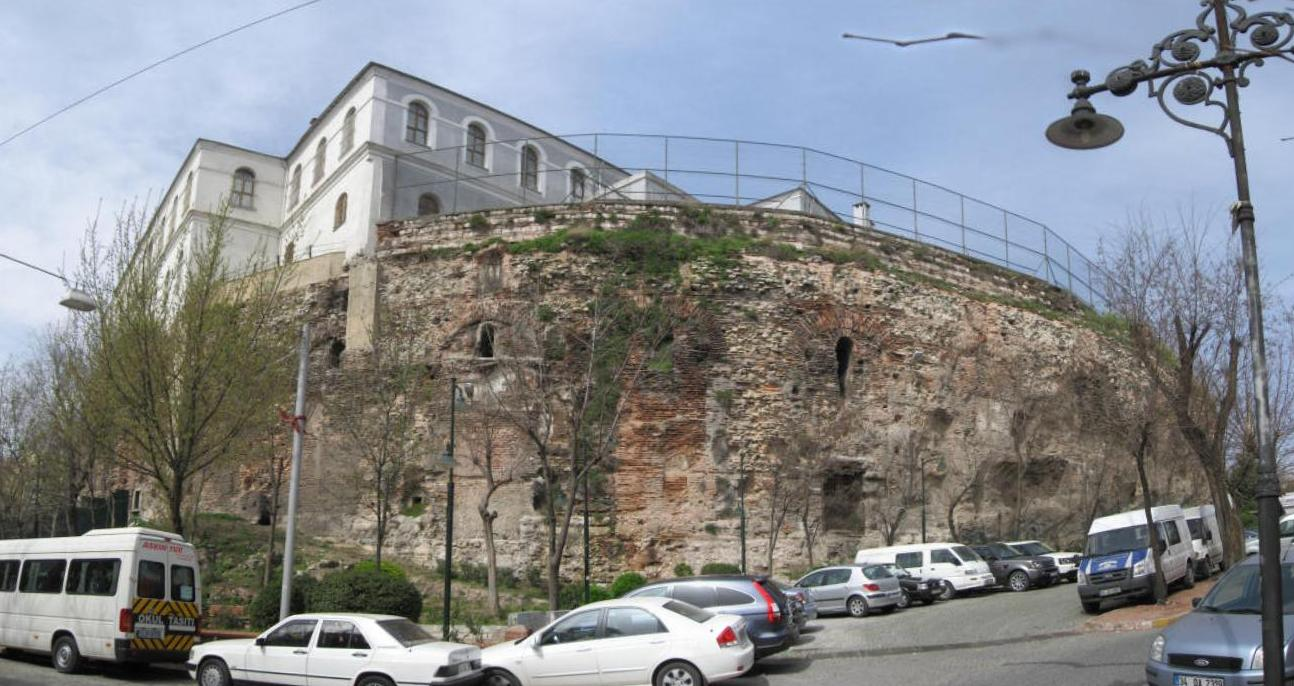
Sfendon — preserved part of the hippodrome (fragment of the southern wall surrounding the stands)

In 476, the barbarian commander Odoacer deprived the last emperor of the Western Roman Empire Romulus Augustulus of power and sent the signs of the imperial dignity to Constantinople. By the end of 5th century the population of the capital and the nearest suburbs has reached 700 thousand people (according to other data, at the beginning of VI century it was about 500 thousand people). According to the historian Zosima, who lived in that period, Constantinople was a crowded and cramped city. Foreign merchants and numerous pilgrims who came to the city noted in their notes and memoirs wide central streets with covered galleries, spacious squares decorated with columns and statues, majestic imperial palace and residences of rich nobles, Christian temples, triumphal arches and a large hippodrome. The main street —Mesa ("Middle")— stretched from west to east, from the Golden Gate through the forums of Arcadia, Voloviy, Theodosius (Bull) and Constantine to the Augusteon square, in the center of which stood the statue of Helena Equal to the Apostles or Augusta. The Mesa and the large squares it crossed were the real center of the capital's commerce. Rows of shops stretched from the Augusta Square to the Forum of Constantine, where there was a brisk trade in expensive fabrics, clothing, jewelry, and incense. In other squares, cattle, meat, fish, grain, bread, wine, oil, dried fruits, raw silk, soap, and wax were traded.

In addition, the most important state, religious and public buildings were located on the stone-paved Mesa Street and in the adjacent quarters (on both sides of the Mesa there were houses with two-storey shaded porticoes and colonnades), along which the imperial cortege and church processions passed. Most of the other streets in the central part of Constantinople were not more than 5 meters wide and were lined with one- and three-story houses of nobles and merchants, decorated with one-story porticoes, which were often used as trading rooms. The further away from the city center, the narrower and more unkempt the streets became; on the outskirts, they were usually not paved with stone and had no gutters. Here, in multi-storey profitable houses, sometimes reaching and nine floors, lived craftsmen, small shopkeepers, sailors, fishermen, loaders and other working people (if in Rome in the V century there were almost 1.8 thousand individual houses in Constantinople — almost 4.4 thousand, which indicates a large middle class).

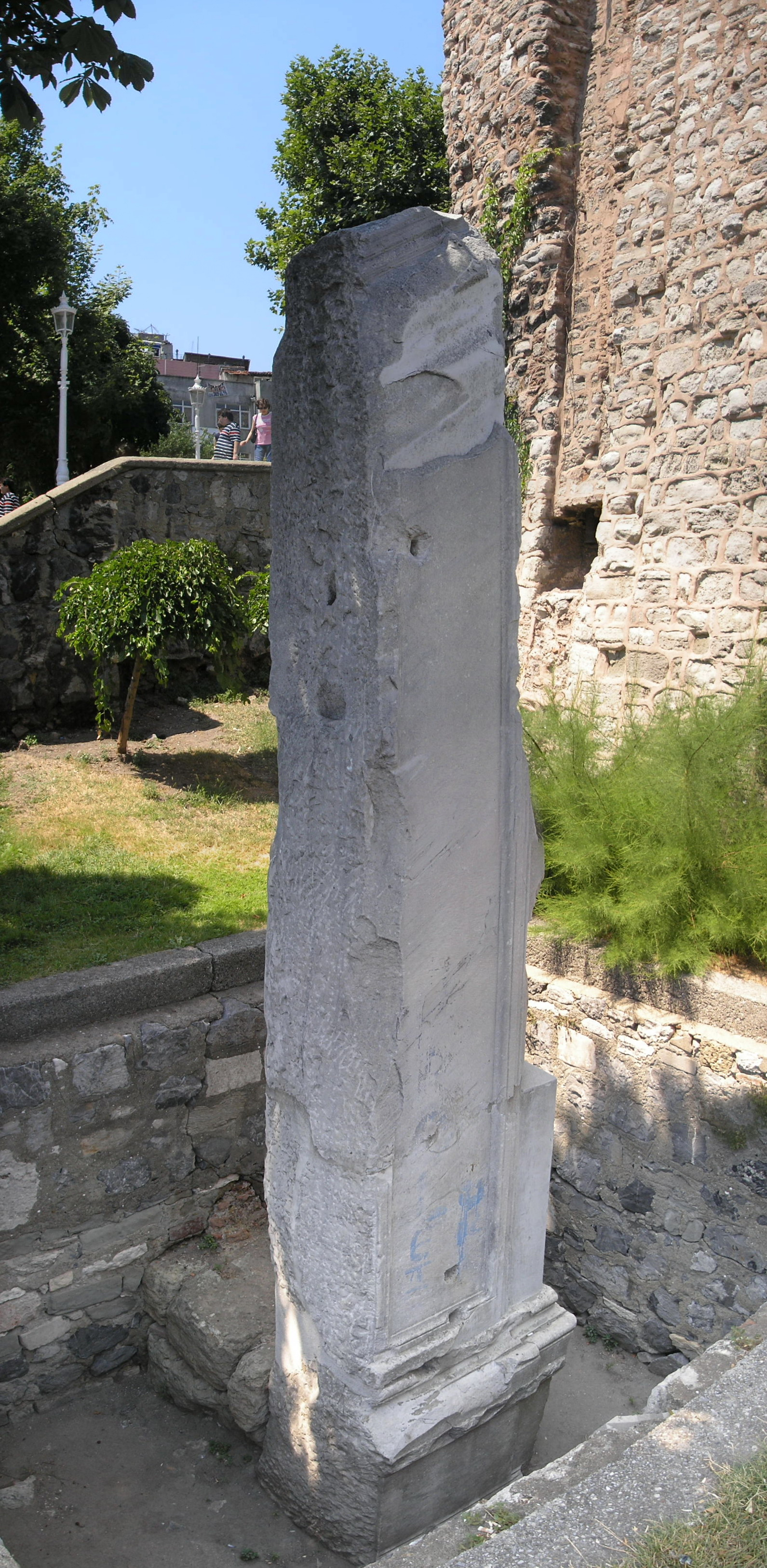
A pillar preserved from the tetrapylon Milius

Most of the most important monuments of Constantinople — the Halki Gate (Halka), which served as the main entrance to the Imperial Palace, (Note: The original core of the future huge complex was the Palace of Daphne, built in the 4th century near the Hippodrome.) the Senate and the Imperial Library, luxurious palaces of the nobility, the Baths of Zeuxippus(where the most valuable works of art were brought from all over the Roman Empire), the Hagia Sophia and the residence of the Patriarch, the Hippodrome and Milius (or Miliarium) (Note: It was a domed building in the Roman style, resting on four columns and richly decorated with sculptures. It served as a reference point for the distances of roads diverging from Constantinople and is now known as the Pillar of Milius.) — were attached to the Augusteon Square. Paved with marble slabs, the Forum of Constantine was richly decorated with columns (in the center rose the famous column of Constantine the Great), porticoes and triumphal arches. Nearby were a large bakers' market and the "Valley of Tears" alley, where slaves were traded. The square Bull Forum (or Bull Square) was adorned with a triumphal arch and the Basilica of Theodosius. From there, the Mesa branched off in two directions — the main road went to the west, to the Golden Gate, and continued into the Roman Egnatian Way; the other part of the Mesa went to the northwest, to the Adrianople (or Charisian) Gate. In the center of the Forum of the Crow stood a huge bronze figure of a bull brought from Pergamum, whose belly served as a furnace in which criminals condemned to such a painful death were burned.

At the beginning of the 6th century, the trade route through the straits of the Black Sea and the duties from the ships again became one of the main sources of the city's prosperity. New large ports were built on the shores of the Sea of Marmara (Theodosia and Juliana) (Note: Large-scale excavations in the area of Theodosia Harbor began in 2004 during the construction of the Istanbul metro line. The remains of dozens of wooden ships, both commercial and military, sunk in a storm were discovered.) in addition to the ports that existed on the shores of the Golden Horn (Prosforion and Neorion) during the ancient Byzantine period. Ships carrying spices, incense, ivory and precious stones from India and Ceylon, silk and porcelain from China, carpets, cloth and pearls from Persia, grain, cotton, glassware and papyrus from Egypt, furs, honey, wax, gold and caviar from the Black Sea region entered these ports, Slaves and pilgrims from the Crimea, the Balkans and North Africa (regular maritime traffic connected Constantinople with Antioch, Alexandria, Ephesus, Smyrna, Rhodes, Patras, Thebes, Corinth, Thessalonica and Chersonesos, as well as with some ports in Italy, Gaul, Spain and North Africa).

In 512, a line of fortifications was built from Selimbria on the Sea of Marmara to Derkont on the Black Sea to protect against Slavic attacks, called the "Long Wall" or the Anastasian Wall (the historian Evagrius Scholasticus called it "a banner of impotence and a monument of cowardice"). The length of the wall was about 50 km, and it was called to protect from enemy raids rich agricultural farms in the western suburbs of Constantinople, which supplied the capital with products. In the same year, 512, there was a rebellion in Constantinople against the religious policies of Anastasius, who openly supported Monophysitism. The crowd, plundering the houses of the emperor's closest associates, wanted to enthrone the consul Areobinda, but he refused the opportunity to usurp power and fled the capital. In 514 to the walls of Constantinople approached the army of the rebellious commander Vitalian, but he did not dare to storm, satisfied with the terms of truce and generous payoffs from Anastasius. Soon Vitalian's troops and fleet were approaching the Byzantine capital again, and once again the emperor was forced to agree to the rebels' terms. In 516 Vitalian undertook the third campaign on Constantinople, but now thanks to the skillful actions of generals Justinian and Marin Syrian rebels have been inflicted heavy defeat. During the reign of Emperor Anastasius, monetary and fiscal reforms were carried out (he abolished the chrysargyr, which made him popular with the merchants and artisans of the capital). During the reign of the Leo dynasty, prominent historians Malchus Philadelphianus and Zosimus worked in Constantinople.

At the top of the social pyramid of the population of Constantinople stood the emperor, his immediate entourage and the highest aristocracy (the patriarch of Constantinople, senators, including illustrians, clarissimi and spectabilis, patricians and consuls, as well as prefects of the praetorium, prefect of Constantinople, military masters, magister officii, prepositor of the sacred bedchamber, quaestor of the sacred palace, comites of the sacred bounties). The senatorial aristocracy included influential relatives of the reigning emperor and provincial dynasties of rich landowners, whose descendants were able to establish themselves at the imperial court. An example of such dynasties are the families of Apion and Laksarion from Egypt. Senators also became commanders, officials, lawyers and diplomats (including those from the "barbarian" tribes, i.e. Goths, Herulians, Gepids, Scythians and other tribes). Very few of the senators were descendants of the old Roman aristocracy who moved to Constantinople in the 4th-5th centuries. Often senators fell out of favor, and their property was confiscated for the benefit of the emperor (Note: The main income of the Constantinopolitan aristocracy came from urban and suburban estates, as well as from renting land, lucrative houses, workshops and baths. The enterprises of the aristocracy, mainly workshops owned by senators, were a serious competition to other craftsmen, as they were exempt from all taxes.)

Next came the highest echelons of the army (committees of exquisitors, domestics and stratilates) and the clergy (bishops, abbots of monasteries and cathedrals), other officials of the imperial court and city administration, university professors and heads of private schools, distinguished physicians, lawyers (especially courtiers who were members of the Imperial Council and served in the Imperial Chancellery), architects, philosophers and other scholars, wealthy merchants-wholesalers, owners of large workshops, argyroprats, shipowners (navicularia) (Note: A privileged group of shipowners were those who delivered Egyptian grain to the capital. Gradually, shipowners shifted from transporting goods to trading them, and over time the terms "navicular" and "sea merchant" became synonymous.) and heads of trade and craft companies. Behind them were ordinary lawyers, physicians, engineers, rhetors, teachers of elementary schools, highly skilled craftsmen and small tradesmen, ordinary clergy and clerical attendants (monks, (Note: If in the middle of the 5th century up to 15 thousand monks lived in Constantinople, in the 6th century this number increased even more. After the Council of Chalcedon, monasteries became the main place of residence for monks, and the authorities began to struggle to clear the streets of wandering monks. During the reign of Justinian, the number of monasteries in the capital exceeded 70.) deacons, subdeacons, readers, singers, ushers, hartophylaxes, skevophylaxes, church economists, notaries, and ekdiks), as well as persons of creative professions (theatrical performers, painters, and sculptors). Small artisans and shopkeepers bore the brunt of paying taxes, rents, interest on loans, and the burden of various state duties. At the bottom of the social ladder were the urban poor, ruined peasants, beggars, and numerous state, church, and private slaves. The poor made up the bulk of day laborers, who were widely used in workshops, shops, gardens, construction sites, ports, and shipyards. Slaves worked mainly in workshops, shops, and as domestic servants (especially in the imperial palace and the homes of the nobility).

== Justinian and his successors ==
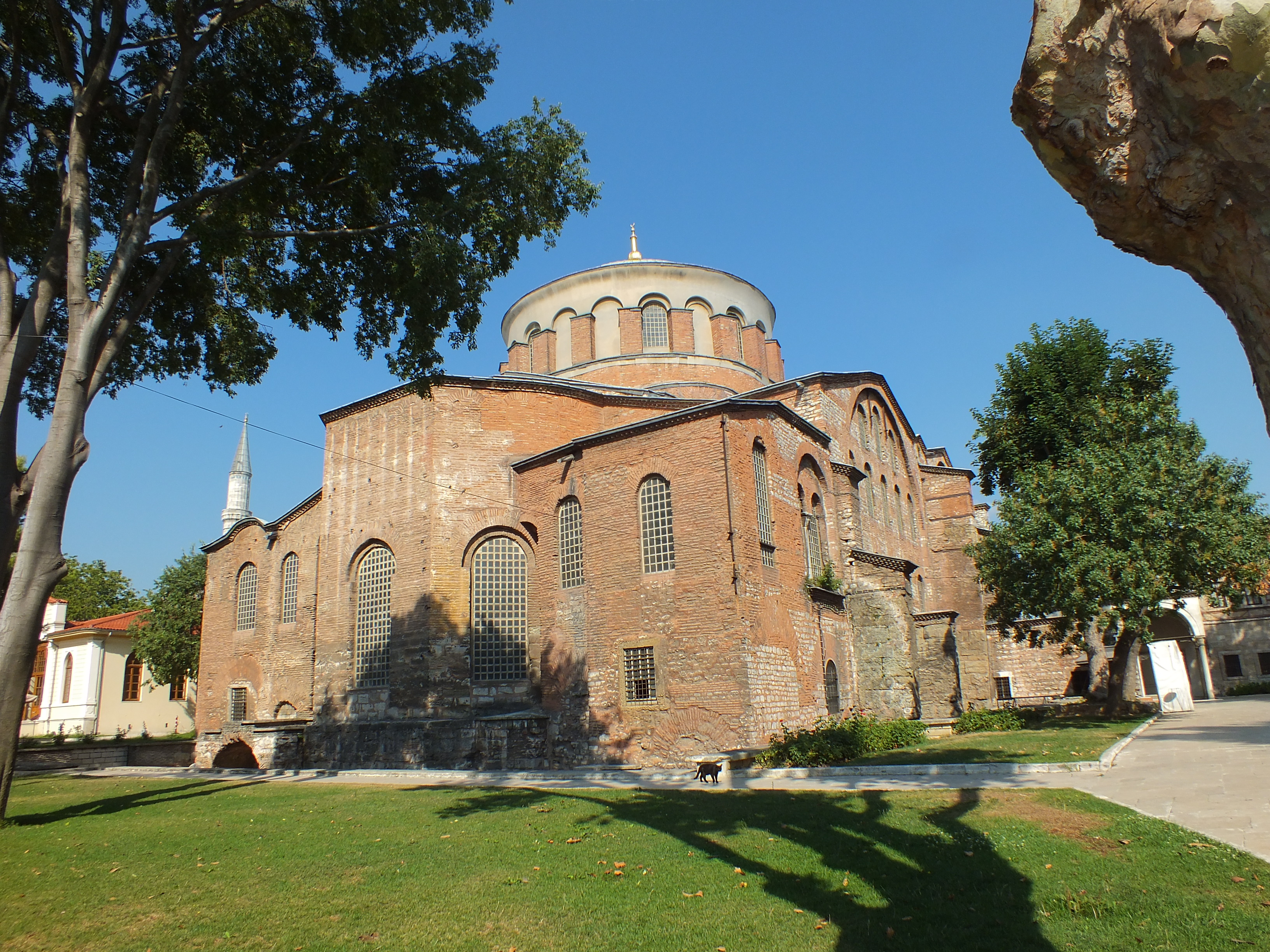
The Hagia Irene, rebuilt after the Nika revolt

In 527, Justinian I, the Macedonian-born nephew of Justinian I the Elder, ascended the imperial throne. At that time, the dimas —mass "sports" (or "circus") parties— acquired a special weight in the capital, first emerging during the competition at the Hippodrome, and then gradually transforming into political organizations of citizens, defending the interests of different classes and strata of society. (Note: In addition to the "sports" dims at the citywide level, there were dims of individual neighborhoods and districts-associations of free citizens who performed economic and political functions, supervising improvement and order in their territories. The majority of small dims were members of one or another "faction" that supported the main "sport" parties.) The Hippodrome played an important role in the political life of the city and the empire; the people used it as a place of assembly where they could express their dissatisfaction with the actions of the authorities. There were four main dimas in Constantinople - Veneti ("blue"), Prasins ("green"), Levki ("white") and Rusii ("red"), named after the colors of the chariot drivers' clothing. The most influential among them were Venets and Prasins, who had elected leaders — dimarchs and dimocrats, the treasury, real estate and armed detachments of city youth who put pressure on the imperial authority. The Venetians were led by large landowners and senators from among the aristocrats (who favored strengthening slaveholding relations, had large interests in the western part of the empire, and close ties to the clergy), the Prasinovs by rich merchants, profiteers, and usurers (who had close ties to the eastern provinces of the empire and patronized the Monophysites), but ordinary members of both parties were from the middle and lower classes of Constantinople. (Note: The ordinary Venetians were dominated by colonists of suburban estates and clients of the landed aristocracy, while the ordinary Prasinians were artisans, workers in workshops and shops, sailors and port movers.) The ruling upper classes of Dimos fought among themselves for power, income, and influence at the imperial court. The masses of ordinary Dimots often participated in urban riots caused by the tax burden and oppression of the authorities, but the leaders of the Dims managed to contain the discontent of the crowds until the time.

In January 532, the riots began in Constantinople, which went down in history under the name of the revolt "Nika", i.e. "Victory". This slogan was chosen by the urban poor who were dissatisfied with the taxation of officials and the religious oppression of the zealous Christian Justinian. The core of the rebels were united Venetians and Prasinians, joined by senators dissatisfied with the emperor. On January 11, equestrian competitions were held at the Hippodrome as usual, but the situation on the stands was heated to the limit. The leaders of the Prasinians with anger at the hated chief of the palace guard Kalopodius, and then through the imperial herald began a dialogue between the leader of the Prasinians and Justinian. To the roar of the crowd that filled the hippodrome, the Prasinians made a series of accusations against the emperor's officials, and then went so far as to openly attack and insult Justinian himself. After the Greens defiantly left the Hippodrome, Justinian ordered the arrest of not only the leaders of the Prasinians, but also some of the leaders of their eternal rivals, the Venetians.

On January 13, Prasinians and Venetians gathered at the Hippodrome and appealed to the emperor to pardon the leaders of the Dims, who had been sentenced to death, and when they received no answer, they revolted against Justinian in Constantinople. Crowds of rebels freed prisoners from jails, destroyed noble houses and archives where tax lists and debt documents were kept, and set fire to government buildings and Christian temples. In the flames of numerous fires the building of the Senate, a part of the buildings on the Augusteon Square, the majority of the buildings on the Mesa Street to the Forum Constantine, the churches of St. Sophia and St. Irina, the Thermae Zeuxippa and a part of the Imperial Palace perished. Justinian made concessions, removing from their posts a number of dignitaries (including John of Cappadocia and Tribonian), but when the rebels demanded the deposition of the emperor himself, he threw groups of mercenaries (Goths and Herulas) against them. Street battles brought success to the rebels, and even the emperor's attempt to reconcile with the Dimotes ended with the crowd again showering Justinian and Theodora with curses and insults. The emperor was forced to flee the Hippodrome and prepared to leave Constantinople, but Theodora persuaded him to continue the struggle at a meeting of the Imperial Council. In many ways, Justinian's fate was decided by his loyal commander Narses, who managed to bribe some of the Venetians and lure influential senators to the emperor's side.

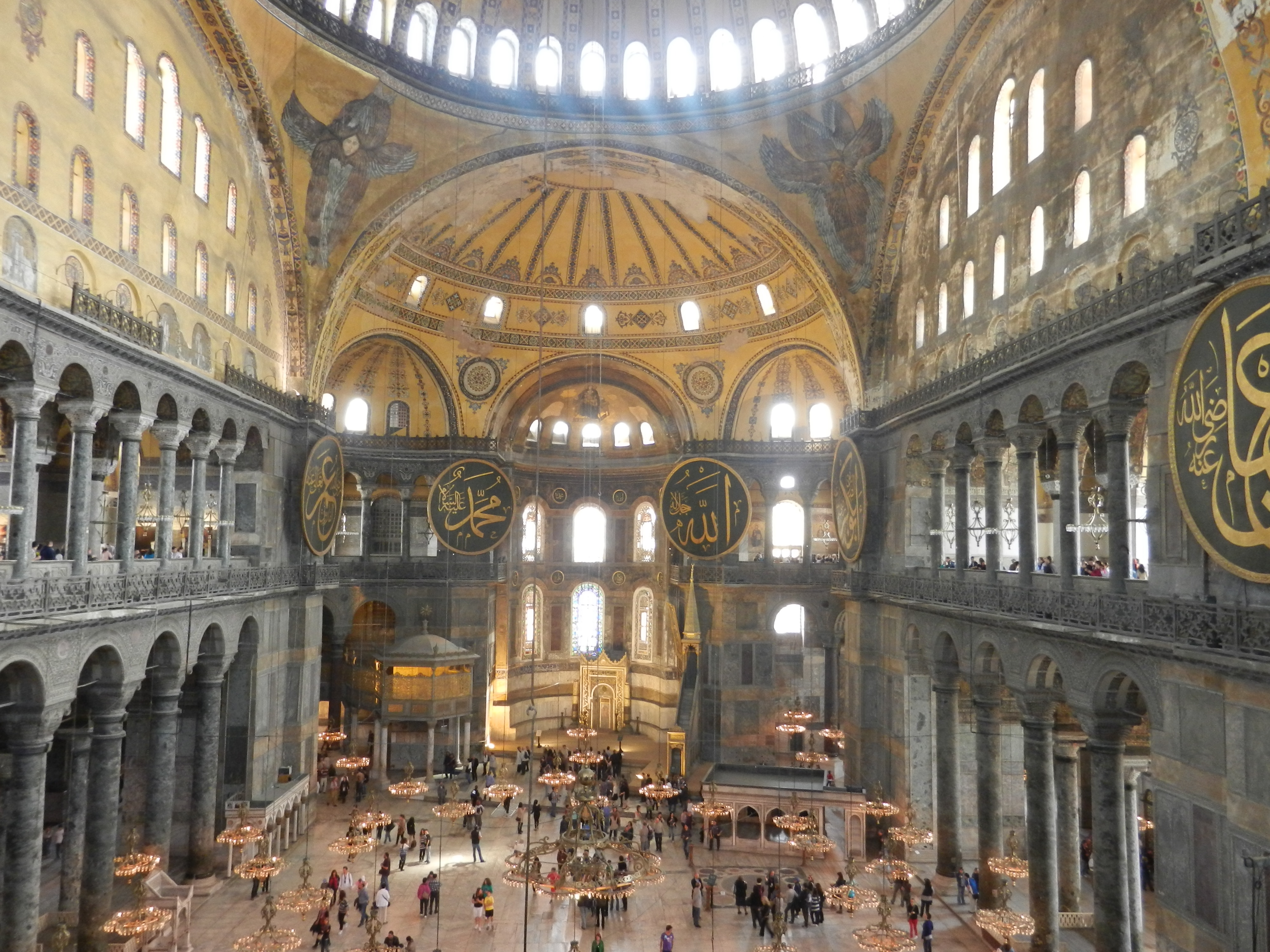
Interior of the Hagia Sophia Cathedral

On January 18, groups of Armenian and Herulian mercenaries under the command of Velisarius, Munda, John the Armenian and Narses attacked the Hippodrome from several sides, taking the rebels by surprise. During the bloody massacre committed by the troops, about 35 thousand people were killed. After the rebellion was crushed, Justinian forbade the Hippodrome to hold any kind of competition for a long time, and it was not until five years later that it resumed. Fearing new rebellions, Justinian ordered to build in the palace in case of a siege of bread stores, and next — to complete a large underground water reservoir, started under Emperor Constantine the Great, which was named Basilica Cistern (earlier, in 528 near the Hippodrome was built another underground cistern — Philoxena). But the main project of the emperor, aspiring to immortalize the name and glory of Constantinople, became construction of new Hagia Sophia Cathedral which by the sizes and magnificence should overshadow all that was built in the capital before that. (Note: Previously, the main churches of Constantinople were considered to be the Church of St. Irene, which also burned in the fire of the revolt, and the Church of the Holy Apostles.) According to the legends, Justinian personally asked the owners of some lands to cede them for the future cathedral, the plan of the cathedral was shown to the emperor in a dream by an angel, and some disputes between Justinian and the architects were resolved by the intervention of heavenly powers. The laying of the foundation stone began on the morning of February 23, 532, the fortieth day after the great fire that had destroyed the previous church. For the construction of the temple in Constantinople were invited architects Anfimius from Trall and Isidore from Miletus, the construction was employed about 10 thousand craftsmen and workers. Justinian personally observed the progress of the work almost every day, coming to the site in the afternoon. In 534, a new code of Justinian was issued, which regulated all aspects of life in Byzantine society.

The construction of the cathedral took about six years and consumed enormous funds, equal to almost all the revenues of the Byzantine Empire. For example, the annual income of such a rich province as Egypt was spent only on the ambo and choirs. (Note: During the years of temple construction, taxes were increased and many provincial officials almost stopped paying their salaries.) Costly building materials (marble, granite, and porphyry) were brought to Constantinople from all corners of the Empire, as well as the surviving fragments of ancient buildings — marble columns from Rome, Athens, and Ephesus, snow-white marble from Prokonez, light-green marble from Karystos, white-red marble from Iasos, pink marble with veins from Phrygia. At one point Justinian even wanted to cover the entire cathedral with gold tiles, but he was dissuaded from this wasteful idea. When the emperor entered the temple on the day of its consecration (December 27, 537), he exclaimed: "Praise be to the Most High who has chosen me to accomplish this great deed! I have surpassed you, Solomon!" The celebrations for the consecration of the cathedral lasted 15 days, and coins and bread were distributed in the streets in Justinian's name. (Note: From then on, all Byzantine emperors were crowned in Hagia Sophia.) During Justinian's reign, the churches of St. Irene (536) and of the Holy Apostles (549) were rebuilt, as well as the church of St. Polyeuktes (527), the church of St. Sergius and Bacchus (536), and the unique aqueduct that brought water from the Kidaris River to Constantinople (its four two-story arches 36 m high were thrown over a 140 m wide stream). A huge column was erected near the Hagia Sophia Cathedral, crowned by a bronze equestrian statue of Justinian.

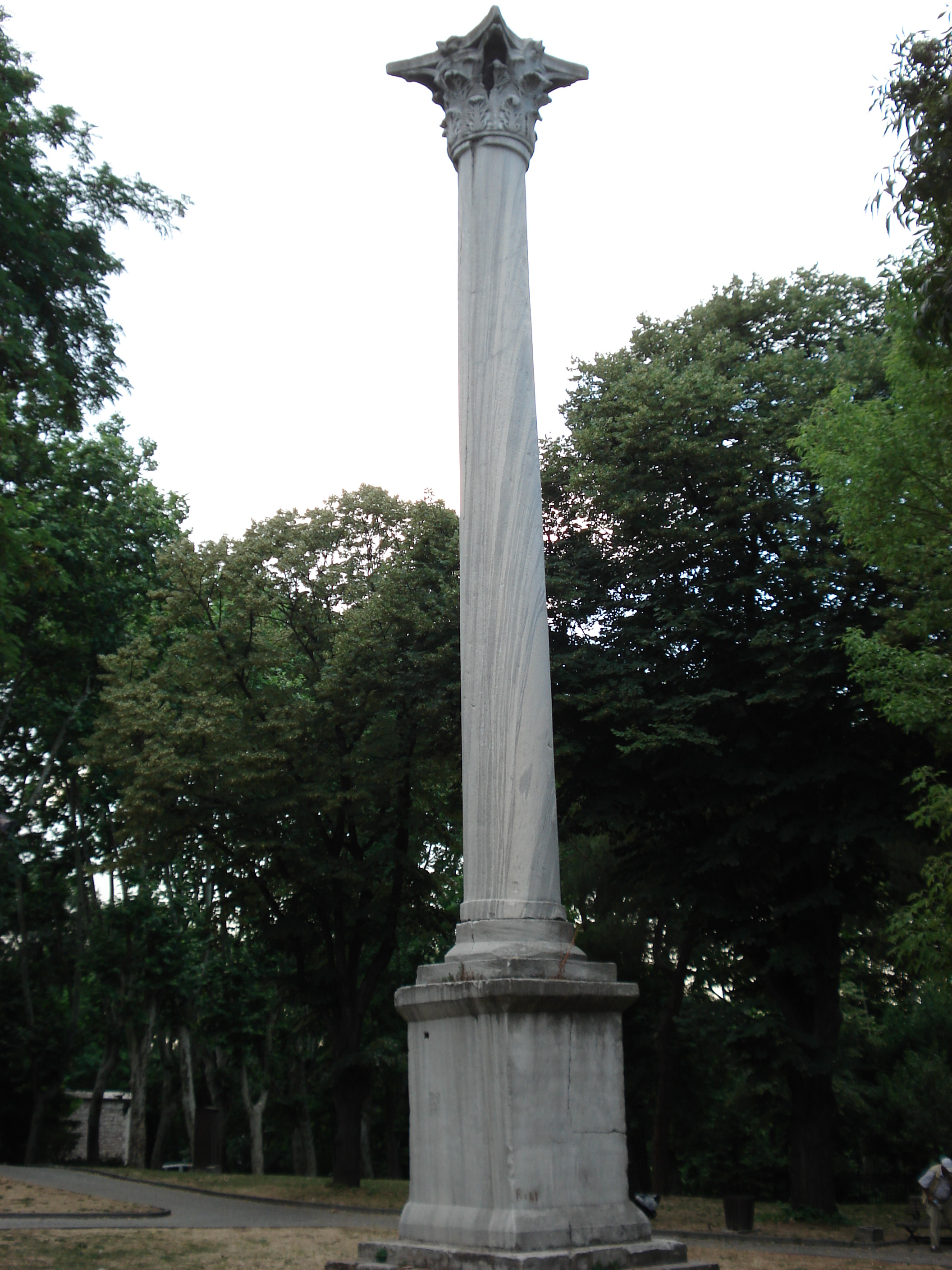
The granite Column of the Goths, in antiquity, adorned with a statue of the legendary Byzantium

In the first half of the 6th century, Constantinople's handicraft sector included state workshops for the production of linen, wool and silk fabrics, dyeing and sewing workshops, workshops for the production of luxury goods (especially jewelry) and weapons, minting facilities, bakeries using Egyptian grain, shipyards, oarsmith and purple shellfishermen's workshops. Some trades were forbidden to private individuals and were subject to imperial monopolies. It was not easy to become a member of the state corporations (workshops); in addition to the right age and skills, one had to come from the family of a member of the corporation. There were also several thousand workshops of free craftsmen in the city, united in their trade and crafts corporations (almost 1.7 thousand workshops and shops were exempt from state taxes, in return they financed the needs of Hagia Sophia and provided fire protection of Constantinople). Private enterprises included blacksmiths, weavers, potters, tanners, shoemakers, furriers, jewelers, knife makers, agricultural tool makers, candle makers and soap makers, as well as artels of masons, carpenters, painters, diggers, stonecutters and gardeners. Most of the workshops and shops of the same profile formed specialized quarters, for example, argyroprats settled on the Mesa. A considerable part of the workers of Constantinople was employed in the maintenance of proastia — landed estates, which were the estates of the emperor, aristocrats, monasteries and churches with extensive auxiliary agriculture.

During the reign of Justinian had to restore destroyed in the era of the Great Migration of peoples trade links with the Black Sea region and the transformation of Constantinople into an important center of transit trade. Byzantium has achieved unlimited domination in the straits and a basin of the Black Sea, which has allowed Justinian to collect high customs duties from all passing capital ships. (Note: Until the beginning of Justinian's reign, goods imported into Constantinople were not subject to customs duties (there were only irregular taxes).) Trade was under the constant control of imperial officials who carefully inspected ships and land caravans arriving in the city, determined the amount of duty, established the permissible length of stay of visiting merchants in Constantinople, and controlled the availability of property and goods at the time of their departure. In order to increase the commercial role of the capital, the Byzantine authorities prohibited the transit of a number of goods through the Straits (including grain, wine, olive oil, and some types of silk), forcing foreign merchants to make their purchases in Constantinople itself. These restrictions, on the one hand, contributed to the prosperity of the capital's trading companies and, on the other hand, stimulated the formation of neighborhoods of foreign merchants in the city. (Note: The city had stable communities of merchants, money changers and moneylenders from Alexandria, Syria, Cilicia, Rhodes, Chios and Italy.) Ships from Egypt, Canaan, the Crimea, Italy and Spain stood in the ports of Constantinople, caravans from Mesopotamia, Persia, Arabia, the Caucasus and India flocked to the inn.

Retail trade was concentrated in shops and arcades along the Mesa (from Milius to the Forum of Constantine) and the Artopolis. There were special markets, such as for imported goods (at Julian's harbor) and a cattle market. The port of Hieron, on the Asian side of the Bosphorus, where Justinian ordered a permanent customs house to be built, was a lively trading center. The emperor's merchants and other influential people, as well as merchants-wholesalers and various intermediaries, bought goods here and transported them to Constantinople by ship. There were many shops in the city where they traded in expensive fabrics and ready-made clothes, jewelry and precious stones, wax, candles, soap and incense, wine, olive oil, spices and condiments, meat, fish, vegetables and fruits. Alongside the merchants was a layer of officials who formalized transactions, money changers and moneylenders who accepted money at interest, as well as gold and silver for storage, paid bail, appraised property, acted as intermediaries in transactions or guarantors in the payment of debts, lent money at interest or bail, sold property at auction (including property confiscated, died without wills, or ruined people), and even appraised coins. Senators, other aristocrats or their representatives took an active part in financial transactions.

By the end of Emperor Justinian's reign, the Byzantine Empire was at its height, encompassing most of North Africa and Italy, parts of Spain and Armenia, Dalmatia, and the territory of the former Byzantine Empire. Controlling such rich areas as the Balkans, Asia Minor, the Aegean Islands, Syria, Palestine, and Egypt, Byzantium played a paramount role in the international relations of the early Middle Ages, and Constantinople was the center through which the collected taxes and military spoils of this vast power flowed. In the capital settled Slavs and Thracians, Arabs and Jews, Armenians and Copts, Goths and other barbarians, natives of Italy and Spain, most of whom converted to the Greek language, accepted Orthodoxy and quickly assimilated Byzantine traditions. Justinian established the unlimited power of the emperors, granted significant privileges to the Church, and guaranteed the rights of private property; it was under him that the transition from Roman traditions to the Byzantine style of government took place. This period of prosperity was overshadowed by the so-called "Plague of Justinian" of 541-542, brought to Constantinople on grain ships from Egypt (according to various estimates, at its peak the pandemic killed 5 to 10 thousand citizens per day, thus destroying 40 to 50% of the capital's population). In 553, on the initiative of Justinian, the Second Council of Constantinople was held in the capital, which repeatedly condemned Nestorianism as a heresy. In 557 and 558, Constantinople suffered strong earthquakes, many of the city's buildings, including the Hagia Sophia Cathedral and the Monastery of St. Michael with the ancient church of Chora (the church of Christ the Savior "in the village" or "in the fields"), received significant damage.

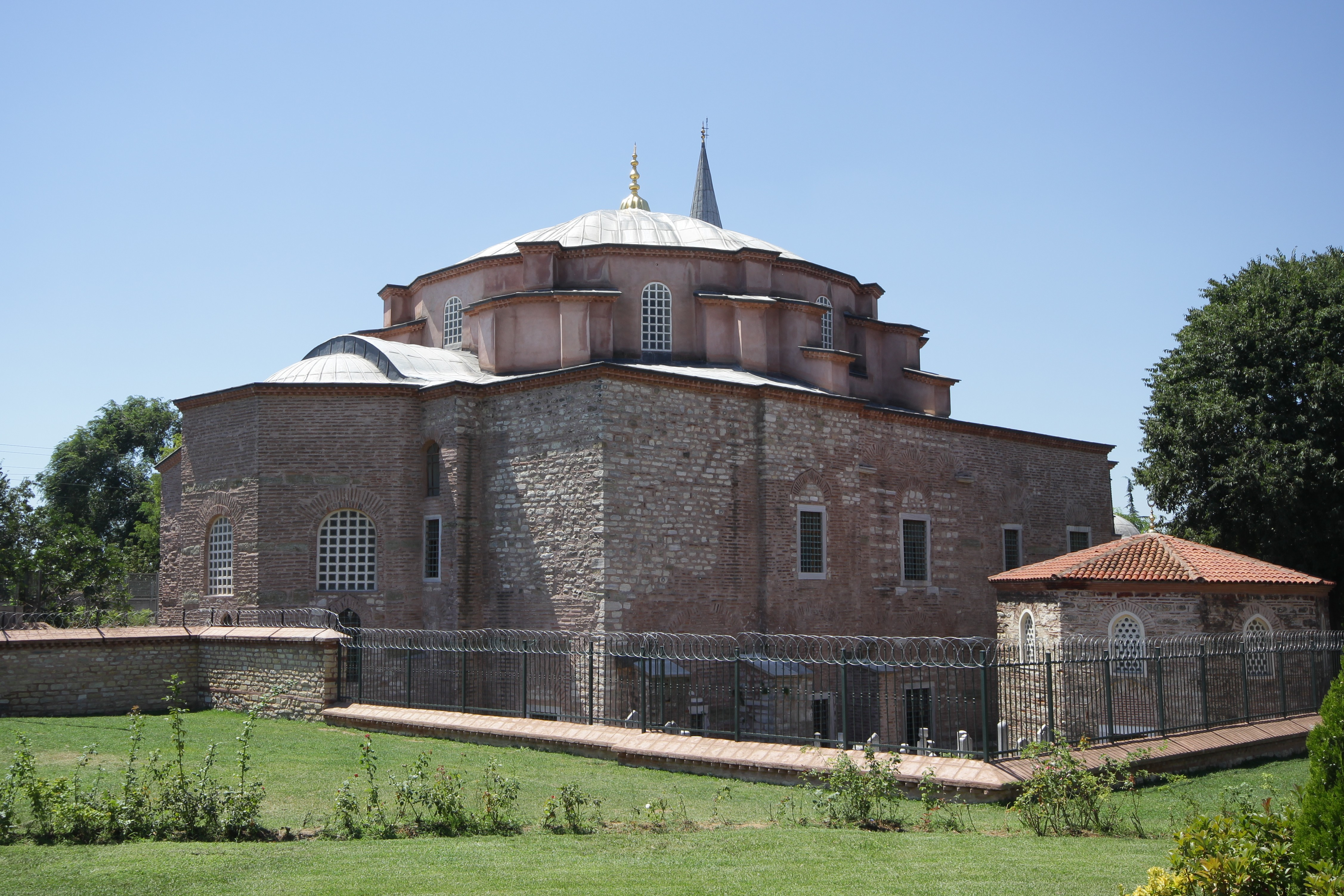
Little Hagia Sophia

In the 6th century, the philosophers Stephen of Byzantium and John Philoponus, the theologian John of Ephesus, the mathematical architects Anfimius of Trallus and Isidorus of Miletus lived and worked in Constantinople, which underwent a rapid cultural and scientific boom during the reign of the Justinian dynasty, The historians Procopius of Caesarea, Agathius of Myrinae (who was also a famous poet), John Malala, Isychius of Miletus, Peter Patricius, Menander the Protector and John Lydus, the geographer Cosmas of Indicople and the poet Paul Silentarius lived and worked in Constantinople. At the end of the 6th and the beginning of the 7th century, rebellions of slaves, semi-independent and ruined peasants, tribes and followers of heresies, soldiers and military leaders of various ranks, often supported by the urban poor of Constantinople, broke out in many areas of the Byzantine Empire (in the capital, where serious speeches occurred in 588, 601 and 602, the situation was complicated by the traditional activity of the Dims). (Note: In addition, the frequent invasions of the Slavs continued, which during the reign of Emperor Maurice often reached the "Long Walls" of Constantinople.) Emperor Mauritius, taking into account the sad experience of Justinian, placated the leaders of the Dims by entrusting armed detachments of Prasinians and Venetians, numbering about 2,500 men, to guard the city walls. However, due to the lack of grain, the unrest did not subside and led to an open attack by the crowd on the emperor during the procession. Under hail of stones Mauritius with the son and the retinue has been forced to hide behind walls of Blachernae palace, and dimots have left the posts on walls and have joined rebels. When in 602 on capital have moved rebellious against emperor the parts of the Byzantium army, standing on Danube, it is rebellious city plebs and slaves have helped them to seize Constantinople. Mauritius fled on a small ship, but was soon caught and executed in Chalcedon (and first all his children were beheaded before his eyes).

One of the military leaders who rebelled against Mauritius —Centurion Phocas— was enthroned, against whom the still influential slave-owning nobility, senatorial aristocracy, large landowners, part of the provincial and capital officials and generals opposed, which resulted in an open civil war between supporters and opponents of the new emperor. In 603 the capital excitements have come to an end with grandiose fire during which many buildings of the central part of Constantinople have burnt down. In 607 and 609 authorities brutally suppressed demonstrations against Phocas prasinov, having beheaded and drowned many rebels, but repressions only worsened position of the usurper. Meanwhile, the Persians under the Sassanid Shahinshah Khosrow II Parviz easily overpowered the demoralized Byzantine army, plundered Asia Minor and reached Chalcedon.

During the reign of Justinian, an influential Armenian diaspora began to emerge in Constantinople, which later played a major role in the life of the Byzantine Empire. At the imperial court, Armenians served as commanders and advisors, diplomats and treasurers. In 571, after an unsuccessful uprising against the Persians, many representatives of the Armenian nobility fled to Constantinople, including Prince Vardan Mamikonian, Catholicos of all Armenians, and several bishops. At the same time, the first emperor of Armenian origin, Mauritius, ascended the Byzantine throne. However, not all Armenians found themselves in Western Byzantium of their own will, Tiberius II and Mauritius practiced forced deportation of the population from Armenia to Thrace, as a result of which some Armenians from the western regions of the empire moved to the capital.

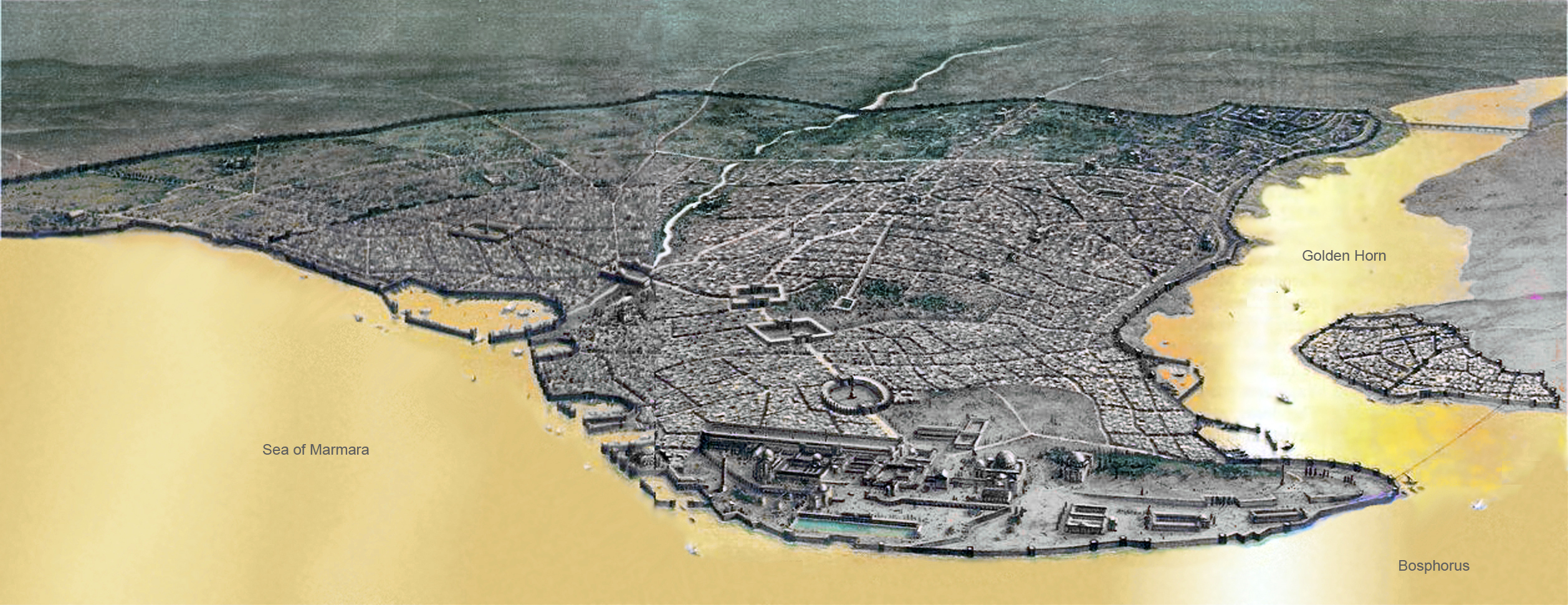
Bird's-eye view of Byzantine-era Constantinople (reconstruction)

From the time of Constantinople's founding, there were numerous inns, guesthouses, and pilgrim shelters to accommodate both visitors to the city and pilgrims from Europe to Jerusalem (pandohayons and mitates were commercial, while xenodochia were charitable institutions that housed the poor). During the reign of Justinian and his successors, xenodochia began to transform into medical institutions that provided medical care to the poor. Many xenodochia had plots of land (proastia) with workshops, gardens and orchards in the city and suburbs, which were leased on a long-term basis (emphyteusis) and the income used to maintain the buildings and doctors. Later, with the financial support of emperors, wealthy citizens, and monasteries, xenodochia as almshouses with a medical focus became a widespread phenomenon in Constantinople. On the Asian side of the Bosphorus there was a leprosarium Argyronius under the jurisdiction of the Church. There were many physicians in the city, both those who received salaries from the state (a privileged group of court physicians stood out among them) and those who lived solely on the funds they received from patients.

== Heraclius and his successors ==
The civil war ended with the accession of Heraclius I, whose troops entered Constantinople on October 3, 610. Phocas and his cronies were executed and their bodies burned in the Bull Forum. Heraclius was a protégé of the new feudal nobility, which had reached a compromise with the old slave-owning aristocracy, but Byzantium's position in the international arena was not so rosy: from the east the empire was threatened by the Sassanians, from the west by the Avar Khaganate. In 617, Persian armies reached Chalcedon and really threatened Constantinople, after which they made several devastating raids on Byzantine lands in Asia Minor, reaching the shores of the Bosphorus. In 619, Sassanid troops conquered Egypt and cut off grain supplies to Constantinople, forcing the emperor to stop the free distribution of bread for the first time. In 620, Heraclius made peace with the Pannonian Avars, agreeing to pay a huge tribute to their formidable neighbor, and undertook a series of successful campaigns against the Persians. Seizing the moment when the emperor's troops were on another eastern campaign, the Persian army under the command of Farrukhan Shahrbaraz captured Chalcedon in the winter of 625 and devastated the surrounding areas along the Asian shore of the Bosphorus.

In the summer of 626 from the west to Constantinople has moved 300-thousand army of Pannonian Avars, in which structure there were many detachments of the conquered Slavic tribes. The Khagan's armies took by storm the wall of Anastasius and stood at the city walls Theodosius. They were opposed by a fairly strong garrison under the command of the regents appointed by Heraclius — the patriarch Sergius and the patrician Vona, as well as an impressive fleet, the advantage of which was that neither the Avars nor the Persians had significant naval forces. Ships Byzantines easily coped with small ships Slavs and constantly prevented contact between the Avars and settled on the Asian shore of the Bosphorus Persians. Having received refusal in delivery of all treasures of Constantinople, Hagan in the end of June 626 has started an attack of fortress walls, having applied heavy siege towers. The Avars built 12 huge siege towers, to which the Byzantines responded by applying "Greek fire", (Note: Later, under Emperor Constantine IV, it was refined and improved by the architect and mechanic Callinicus, who had fled to Constantinople from Syria captured by the Arabs.) which destroyed all the siege equipment of the enemy.

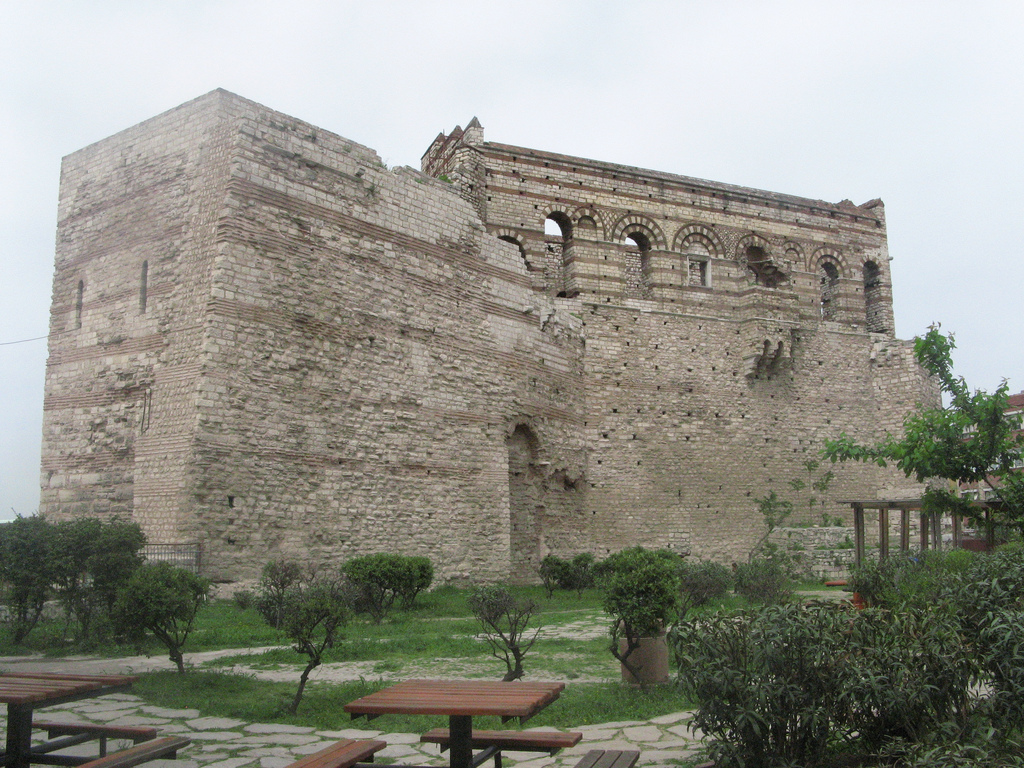
The wall at the Palace of the Porphyrogenitus

After a series of failures on land and sea, the Hagan sent part of the troops and the remaining light Slavic ships to the mouth of the shallow Golden Horn bay, where they could not be reached by the heavy Byzantine ships. But the defenders of the city quickly and secretly strengthened this part of the defense and positioned the fleet along the coast of the Golden Horn, thus luring the Avar assault detachments into an ambush. On the night of August 4, the Kaganate troops suffered another defeat, after which many of the Avars' allies began to leave the besiegers' camp. Khagan was forced to lift the siege and retreat from the walls of Constantinople, destroying the neighborhoods of the capital. After these events, the complex of defensive fortifications in the northwestern part of the city, in the area of the suburb of Blachernae, was strengthened by the so-called Wall of Heraclius, which successfully complemented the line of walls of Theodosius (the wall was almost four meters thick and was fortified with 20 massive towers).

In the spring of 628, Emperor Heraclius entered Constantinople through the Golden Gate in victory, bringing with him many trophies from a successful campaign against the Persians, including the True Cross, other Christian relics, gold from the sacked palaces of the Shah, and hundreds of Byzantine banners previously lost in battle. In 641, after the death of Heraclius, his eldest son from his first marriage, Constantine III Heraclius, ascended the throne, but he died a few months later. As a result of a palace coup organized by the commander Valentinian Arshakuni, troops captured Chalcedon and forced Heraclius' younger son and Constantine III's co-emperor Heraclonas into exile, placing Constantine's minor son Constant II on the throne (he moved his residence from Constantinople to Syracuse, where he was killed by a servant in 668).

In the beginning in the second third of the 7th century, Byzantium entered into a series of wars with the Arab Caliphate, losing Syria, Palestine, Egypt, Upper Mesopotamia, Cilicia, and possessions in North Africa. This hit Constantinople's economy hard, especially since the capital's trade with India and China passed through these lands. The Arabs made regular raids on the empire's possessions in Asia Minor, and their fleet began to threaten Byzantium's maritime dominance in the Aegean Sea basin. In 670, the Arab fleet captured the neighboring city of Cyzicus, and from 674 onward, Arab ships appeared at the walls of Constantinople every five years. (Note: Several attempts by the Arabs to storm the city from the sea failed. Under the walls of Constantinople, Abu Ayyub al-Ansari, an elderly companion and standard-bearer of the Prophet Muhammad, died. The Arabs suffered particularly heavy losses in 678, when many of their ships were destroyed by "Greek fire".) In addition, in the west, most of Byzantium's Italian possessions were overrun by Germanic tribes, and the Balkans were settled by Slavic tribes. From November 680 to September 681, on the initiative of Emperor Constantine IV, the Third Council of Constantinople was held in the capital, which confirmed the condemnation of Monothelitism as a heresy. The situation of the Empire was further complicated at the end of the 7th and the beginning of the 8th centuries by the beginning of a period of political anarchy, caused by a fierce struggle for the imperial throne between different groups of feudal nobility. During the reign of Justinian II, the second phase of the imperial palace complex was built, but after his overthrow in 695, a new period of instability began. For more than two decades, six emperors succeeded to the throne, the last of whom, Theodosius III, remained in power for less than two years.

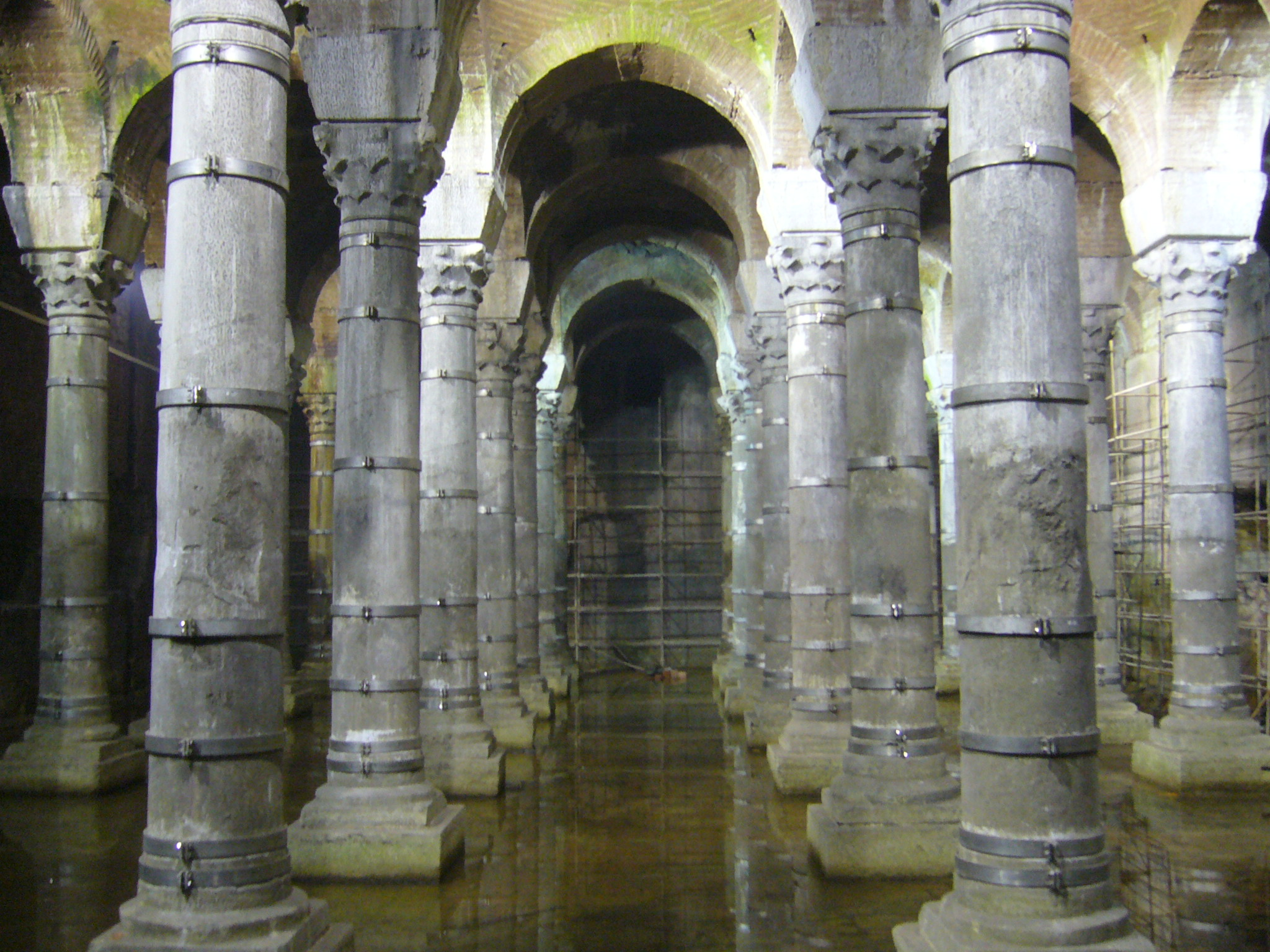
Theodosius Cistern

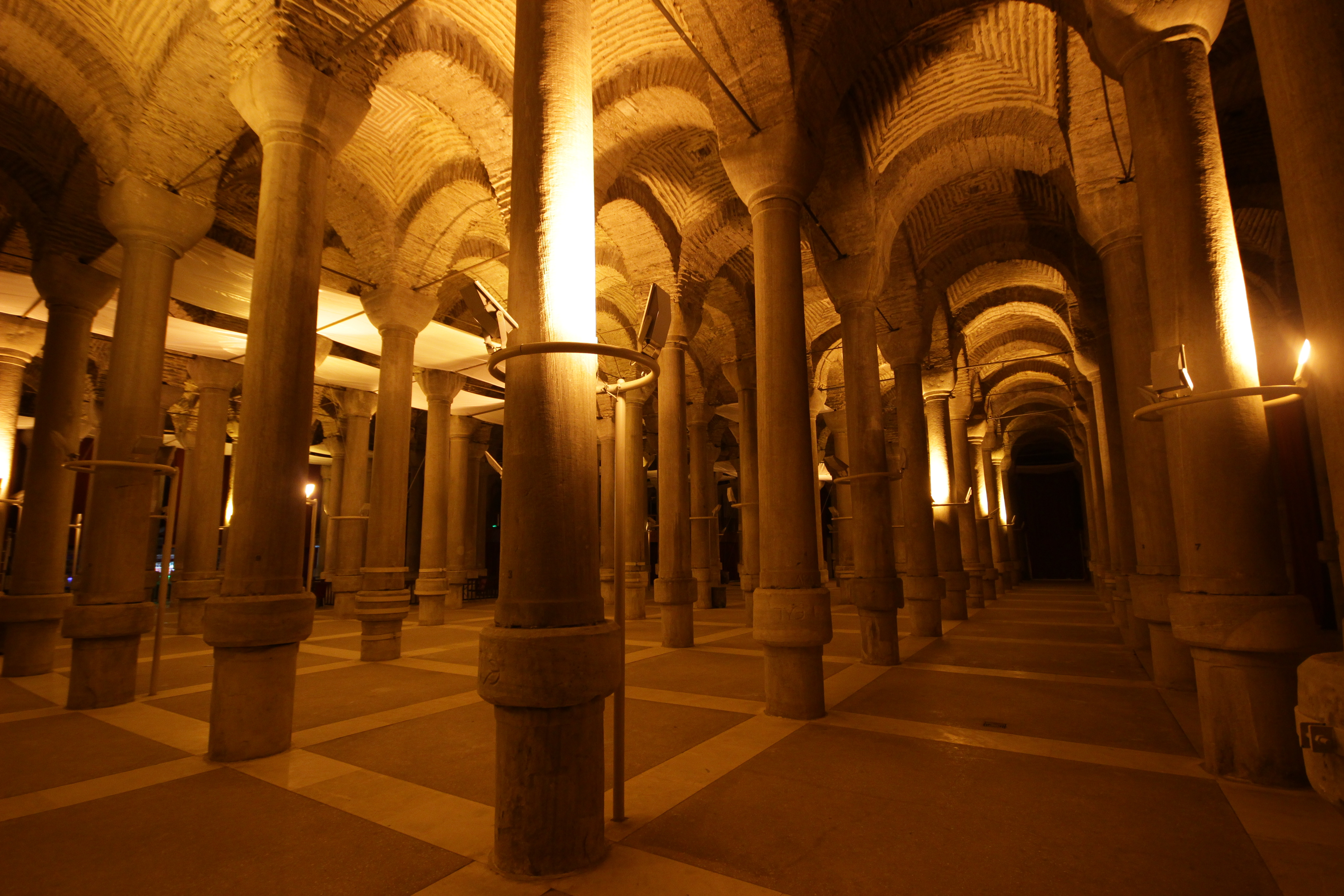
Philoxenus Cistern

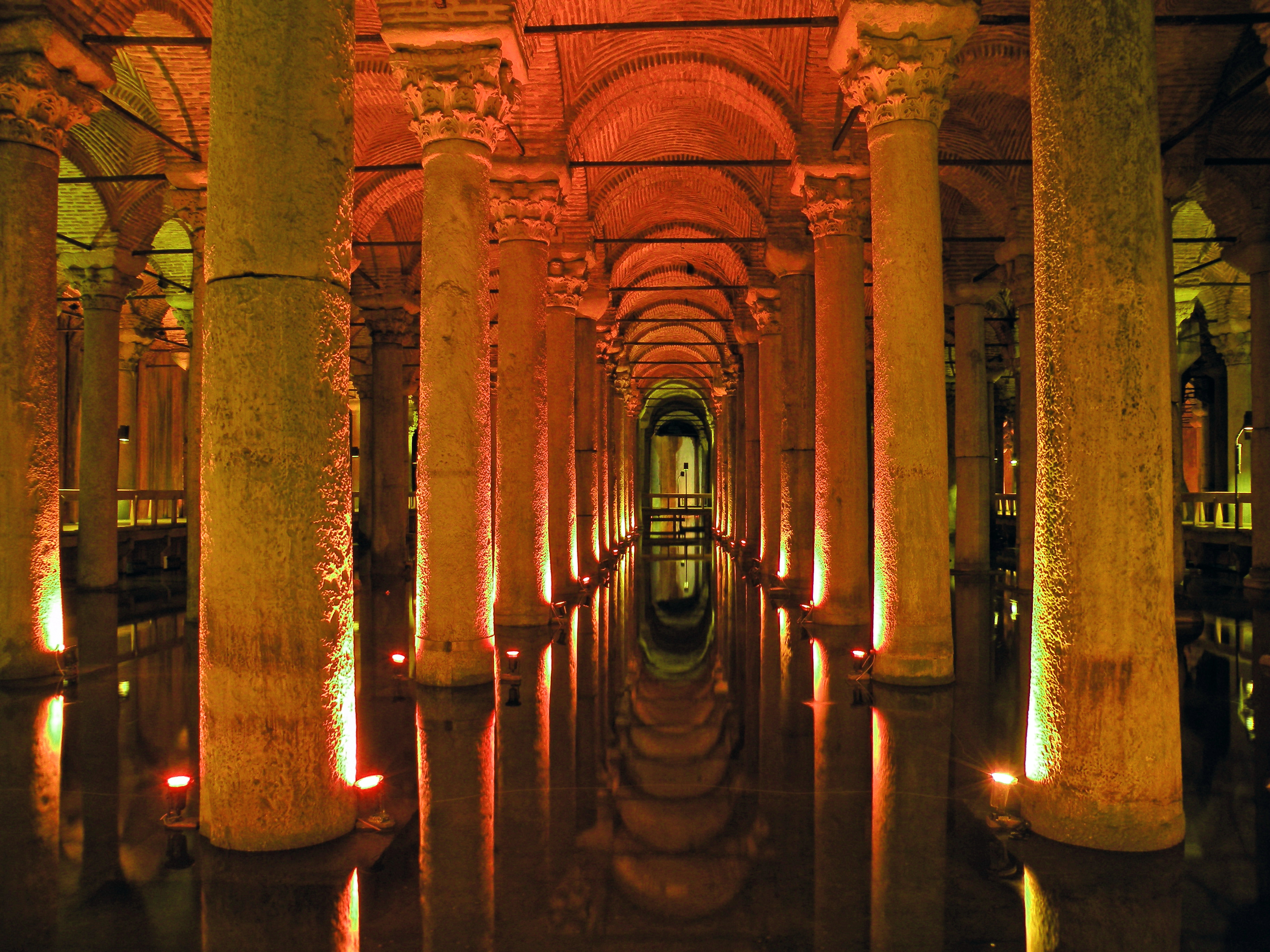
Basilica Cistern

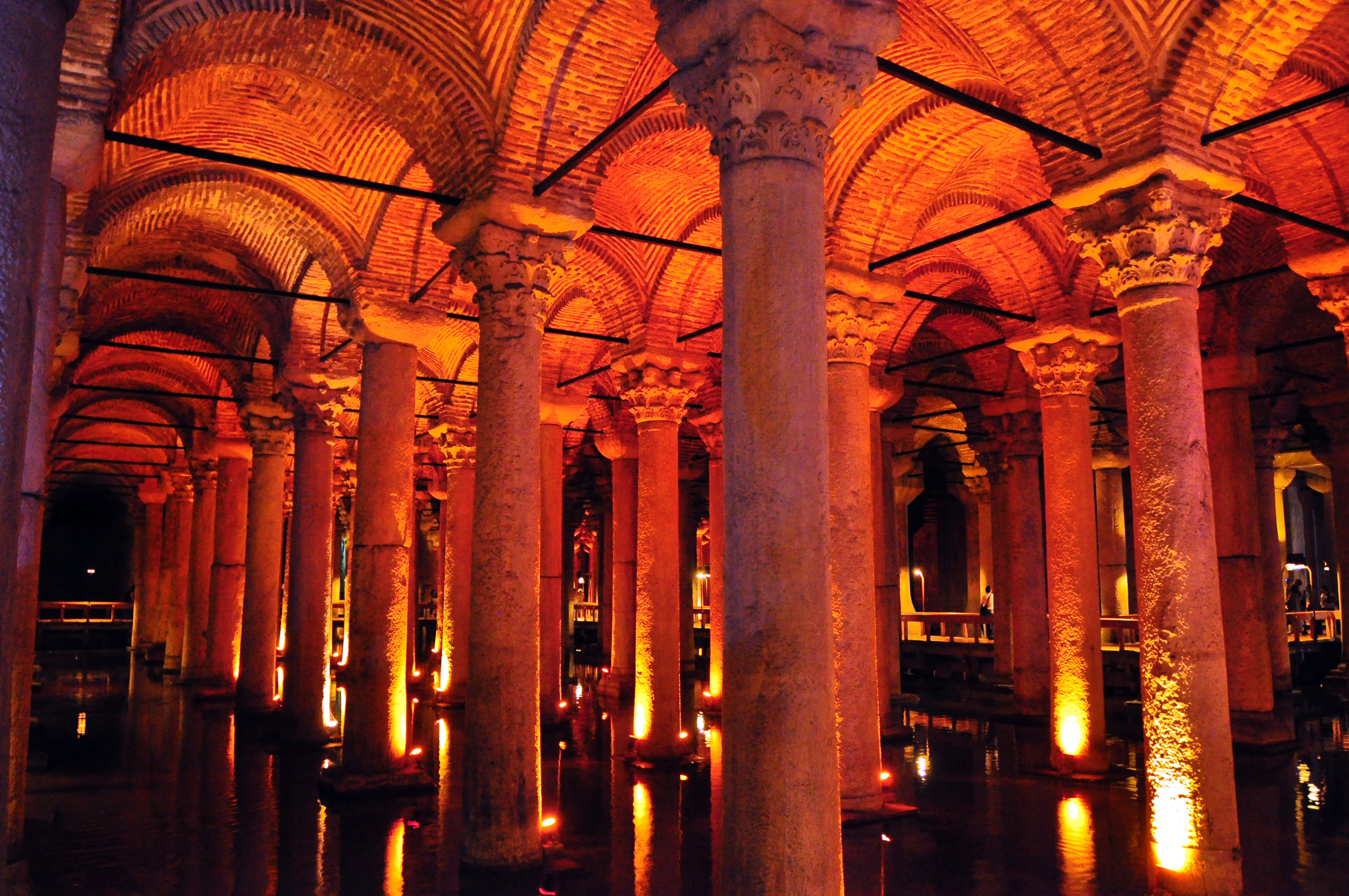
Basilica Cistern

In 695, the commander Leontius raised a rebellion in Constantinople, seized Justinian, ordered his nose and tongue cut off, sent him into exile, and took the throne himself. In 698, the Byzantine navy was forced to leave Carthage under the blows of the Arabs, and its commanders, afraid of the Emperor's wrath, seized the capital, overthrew Leontius (who also cut off his nose and was imprisoned in a monastery), and placed the military leader Tiberius III on the throne. In 705, Justinian II, who had escaped from exile, regained power with the help of the army of the Bulgarian Khan Tervel and ordered the beheading of Leontius and Tiberius in one of the markets of Constantinople. In 711, Constantinople has again seized rebels, proclaimed emperor Armenian by origin Philippicus, who has been executed by all Justinian. In 713, after one of the feasts Philippicus was blinded, and his secretary Anastasius II ascended the throne. In the summer of 715, fierce battles broke out under the walls of besieged Constantinople, culminating in November of the same year with the capture and sacking of the capital by rebellious provincial troops. Anastasius abdicated the throne and tonsured himself as a monk, and the new emperor became Theodosius III (according to one version — the son of Tiberius III). (Note: By the beginning of the 8th century, a new nobility of large feudal landowners and military commanders who controlled the situation in themes (the most influential was the Asia Minor nobility) had finally established itself in Constantinople. Only the Church could argue with them, especially the rich monasticism, which owned vast lands and craft workshops, as well as the top of the capital's trade and craft circles, who feared the strengthening of the military nobility.)

The military events of the 7th century accustomed the inhabitants of Constantinople to be ready for frequent sieges. The inhabitants of Constantinople kept the city walls in good condition, made sure that the granaries were filled with grain and the cisterns with fresh water. The "spiritual defense" of the capital was also important. The Homeric legend about the siege of Troy and the hope for the protection of the Virgin Mary, popular among the inhabitants of the city, added to the confidence of invulnerability (during any external threats to the walls of Constantinople icons of the Virgin Mary, flags with her image, marble crosses and boards with prayers inscribed on them, religious processions, reciting prayers and carrying various relics of the Virgin Mary marched along the bastions). In the 7th century, the historian Theophylact Simocatta, the theologian Maximus the Confessor, and the poet George of Pisidai lived and worked in Constantinople.

== Isaurian dynasty ==
In the spring of 717, the throne was seized by Leo III the Isaurian, a strategos of Armenian origin who founded the Isaurian dynasty, and in August of that year Constantinople was besieged by a large Arab army under the command of Maslama ibn Abdul-Malik. The besiegers dug a trench in the walls of Theodosius, built stone walls to fortify their positions, and installed their huge siege engines against the towers of Constantinople. Meanwhile, the Arab fleet, which numbered about 1.8 thousand ships, entered the Bosphorus to block the capital from the sea, but this time the Byzantines with the help of "Greek fire" burned many enemy ships. With the onset of the harsh winter, a large-scale famine began in the besiegers' camp, and the new squadron that arrived in the spring of 718 was again defeated. In addition, the Bulgarian detachments of Khan Tervel, allied with Leo III, began attacking the Arab rear, forcing the Arabs to dig another defensive moat. Finally, on August 15, 718, the Arabs were forced to lift the siege and retreat. It was during this siege that the Byzantines first used a barrier chain (cast-iron links held afloat by wooden buoys) to block the entrance to the Golden Horn.

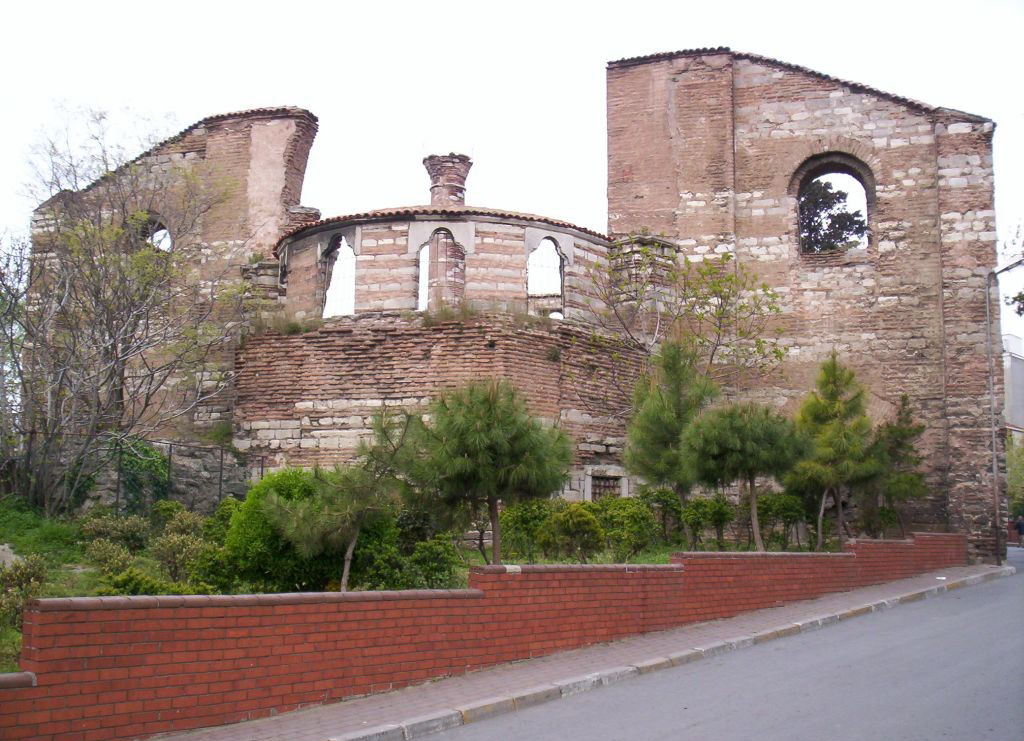
Monastery of Stoudios, the main stronghold of the iconoclasts

In 723 the emperor issued a decree requiring all Byzantine Jews to be baptized according to the Greek ritual. (Note: Overall, the Byzantine emperors since the time of Justinian were hostile to the Jews and oppressed them in every way possible in their civil rights.) After exhausting wars with the Persians, Avars, and Arabs, and as a result of a series of epidemics, the population of Constantinople declined considerably. The capital was in desperate need of fresh water (the aqueduct of Valentus, destroyed by the Avars during the siege of 626, was rebuilt only after a century and a half), and there was a shortage of bread due to the cessation of imports of Egyptian grain (the deficit was partially alleviated by planting fields in the suburbs of Constantinople). But if in the scale of world politics the importance of Constantinople decreased from the time of Justinian I, then in the scale of the Byzantine Empire, especially after the capture of Alexandria and Antioch by the Arabs, on the contrary, it increased. Constantinople became a city unlike any other in the empire, and its role as the main commercial, financial, and cultural center increased even more (the Byzantines themselves called their capital "king of cities" and "the eye of the universe").

The major centers of culture were the numerous private schools run by eminent scholars, as well as schools in monasteries and churches. Medicine, mathematics, astronomy, chemistry, philosophy, and jurisprudence were developed in Constantinople, and the city was considered an influential center of theology. In 726, Leo III issued an edict against the veneration of icons, thus beginning the movement of iconoclasm. For a long time it shaped the political life of Constantinople and divided the inhabitants of the capital into two warring camps — iconoclasts and icon worshippers. The emperor, the military, and the feudal nobility sought to limit the Church's influence and gain at the expense of the monasteries' vast possessions, skillfully manipulating the opinions of the discontented masses. One of the brightest episodes of this acute struggle was the performance of the majority of the empire's clergy, led by the Constantinople Patriarch Germanus I, against the iconoclastic policy of the emperor. This conflict ended in 729 with the deprivation of the patriarchal dignity of Herman and his replacement by the protégé of the iconoclasts — Anastasius. In the course of the iconoclasm (especially in 730-787 and 814-842) thousands of icons, mosaics, frescoes, statues of saints and painted altars were destroyed, monks and even high-ranking officials were persecuted, tortured and executed (the persecution of monks and the ruin of monasteries caused the mass flight of brothers to southern Italy, the Black Sea region, Syria and Palestine). In Constantinople, the monastery of Chora suffered the most and fell into ruin.

In fact, throughout the period of the Isaurian dynasty, Byzantium was ruled by a group of ambitious Armenians. After the death of Leo III in 741, the policy of iconoclasm was continued by his son Constantine V. (Note: Under his rule, monasteries were turned into barracks and prisons, monastic lands were distributed to army ranks, and monks were forced to marry under threat of blindness or death.) During Constantine's campaign against the Arabs, power was seized in June 742 by Artabasdos, the husband of the emperor's sister, who entered Constantinople with his troops. In 743, Constantine V has broken off detachments Artabasdos and his son Niketas, after a short siege has taken Constantinople and has closed the blinded usurper in the monastery Chora. Patriarch Anastasius, who took an active part in the rebellion and crowned Artavazd, was publicly flogged and rode naked on a donkey in the hippodrome. In 754, Constantine V convened a church council at the Ierian Palace on the Asian shore of the Bosphorus (Cape Hera opposite Chalcedon), which condemned the veneration of icons. During the harsh winter of 764, the wall along the Sea of Marmara was badly damaged (and in some places destroyed) by large ice floes that the storm threw onto the parapets. In the summer of 797, the capital's garrison mutinied against Constantine VI, who was blinded in the imperial palace on the orders of his mother, Irene. At the end of the 8th century, one of the "pillars" of the party of iconoclasts, the prominent theologian Theodore the Studite, who developed a strict monastic statute, settled in the Monastery of Studios. During the same period, the prominent historians George Syncellus and Theophanes the Confessor, who also opposed iconoclasm, worked in Constantinople. In the 8th century, Byzantium was finally transformed from a slave-owning state into a feudal-type power (although slavery remained much longer than in Western Europe). (Note: As early as the 11th century in Constantinople, slaves were used as domestic servants and craft workers.)

== Nicephorus and his successors ==
In the fall of 802, an influential Byzantine official, Nicephorus, deposed Empress Irene, ending the Isaurian dynasty. In October 811, the armies, gathered on a hippodrome, deposed Nikiphoros' son Staurakios and declared Michael I Rangave, married to Nikiphoros' daughter, as the new emperor. In 813, armies of the Bulgarian Khan Krum have moved to Constantinople, who have broken the Byzantine army at the fortress Versinikia near Edirne, which has forced Michael I to abdicate. The new emperor Leo V Armenian (a scion of the Armenian princely Artsruni family) tried to kill Krum during negotiations, but he managed to escape. The enraged Khan prepared a large number of siege engines, gathered a strong army of Slavs and Avars, but in the spring of 814, on the eve of the decisive campaign, died suddenly. In 820 Leo V ordered the execution of his old comrade-in-arms Michael the Amorian, accused of treason. And he ordered it done in a rather ingenious way — tied to a monkey and burned in the furnace that heated water for the palace baths. Having learned about it, indignant supporters of Michael disguised as monks and killed Leo during the Christmas service (according to one data, in a palace, according to another — in a cathedral of Hagia Sophia), and his elder son and co-emperor Constantine Symbatios with other sons of the deceased emperor were expelled from Constantinople to the Princes' Islands.

== Amorian dynasty ==
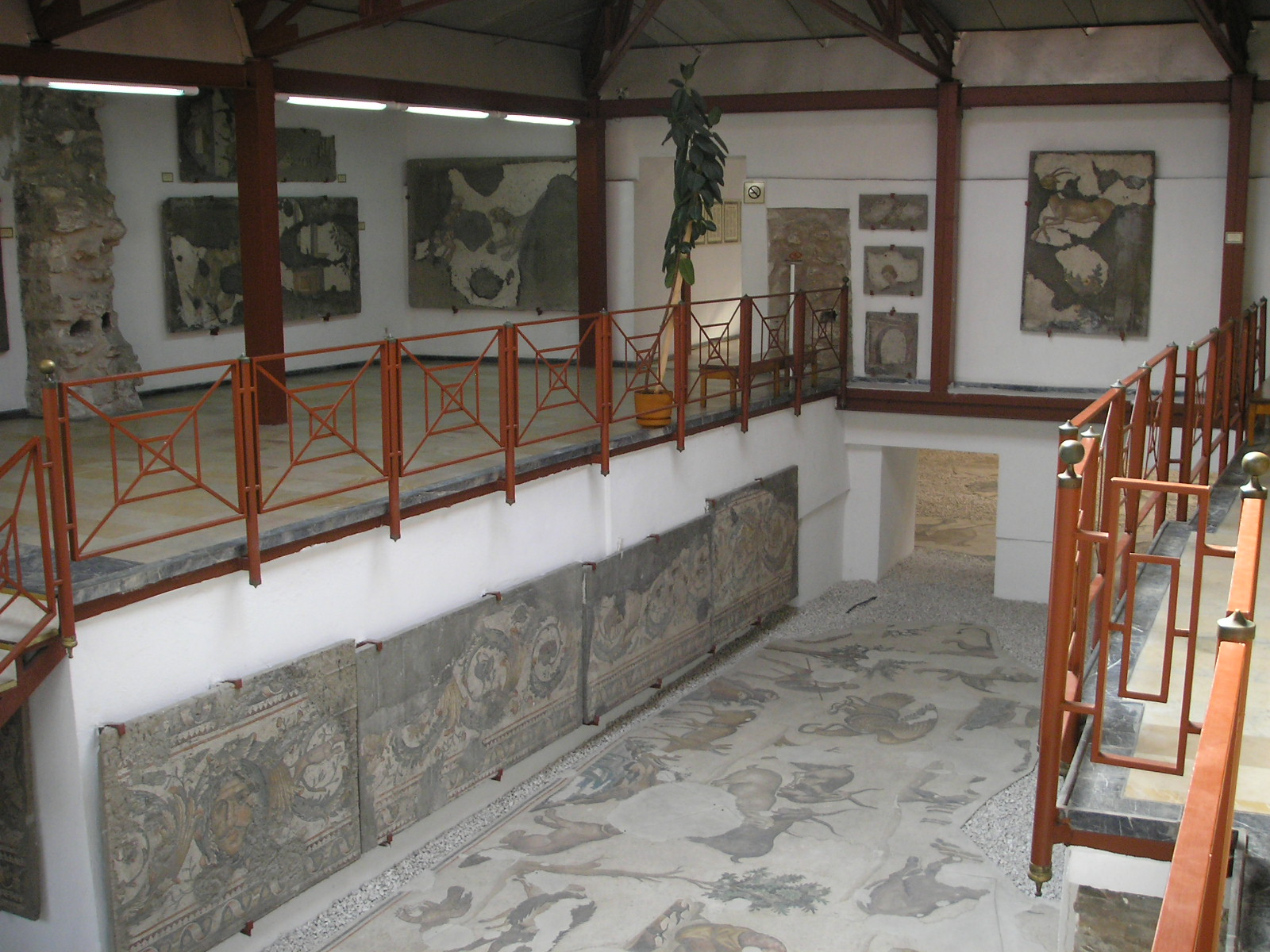
The preserved mosaic of the Great Palace of Constantinople

In 820, Michael II Travol ascended the throne and founded the Amorean dynasty. In 821, a great revolt broke out in Byzantium under the leadership of the military leader Thomas the Slav, who proclaimed himself "miraculously saved" from the blindness of Constantine VI. The insurgents were made up of ruined peasants, the urban poor, soldiers, monks, and runaway slaves, as well as followers of heretical movements and natives of oppressed peoples. From December 821, the army of Thomas the Slav besieged Constantinople for almost a year. Michael II was able to defeat the rebels only after bribing some of Thomas' supporters and enlisting the help of the army of the Bulgarian Khan Omurtag. Thomas was captured and executed after torture (823), but the rebellion was not finally suppressed until 825.

Emperor Theophilos ordered the construction of a number of palace buildings belonging to the third phase of the imperial palace complex. Thus, by the middle of the 9th century, the Great Imperial Palace complex, whose construction took more than five centuries (it was founded by Constantine the Great and then expanded and rebuilt by his successors), occupied a vast area in the southeastern part of the Bosphorus cape, between the Sea of Marmara, Augusteon Square and the Hippodrome. The total area of the buildings of the Great Imperial Palace and the adjacent palaces of Magnaura and Boukoleon exceeded 400 thousand square meters. The area of the Great Palace included the personal residence of the emperor, living quarters for members of the imperial family and the palace garrison (including the Imperial Guard), rooms for numerous servants, halls for ceremonial receptions, extensive gardens and parks decorated with statues, fountains and pavilionsю

Among the most outstanding constructions of the Great Palace, the sources of that period mention the two-story Triconchus, which served as the throne room (its lower floor had a beautiful circular gallery), as well as the Sigmas, Triclinium, Eros, Mysterion (its hall astonished contemporaries with its acoustics), Kamilas and Mousikos. All these palace buildings were decorated with expensive varieties of marble (often multicolored), mosaics and gilding (especially the roofs), richly decorated with sculptures, frescoes and paintings, in their architecture widely used arches, vaults and columns. The personal residence of the emperor, which consisted of a series of halls, was particularly luxurious. Many works of art of ancient and Byzantine masters made of marble, precious stones, gold, silver and ivory were kept here. In the main hall of the Magnaura Palace, where foreign nobles and ambassadors were usually received, there was a golden imperial throne with two golden lions on the steps in front of it. Behind the throne was a golden tree with golden birds perched on its branches. (Note: Everything in this hall was designed to amaze the guests: the emperor entered to the sound of choir and organ, his luxurious clothes were studded with jewels, he ascended on a throne to the ceiling and descended gently; at the appearance of the guests, golden lions rose and roared, birds on the tree flapped their wings (all the devices were set in motion by water and mechanisms hidden from prying eyes).)

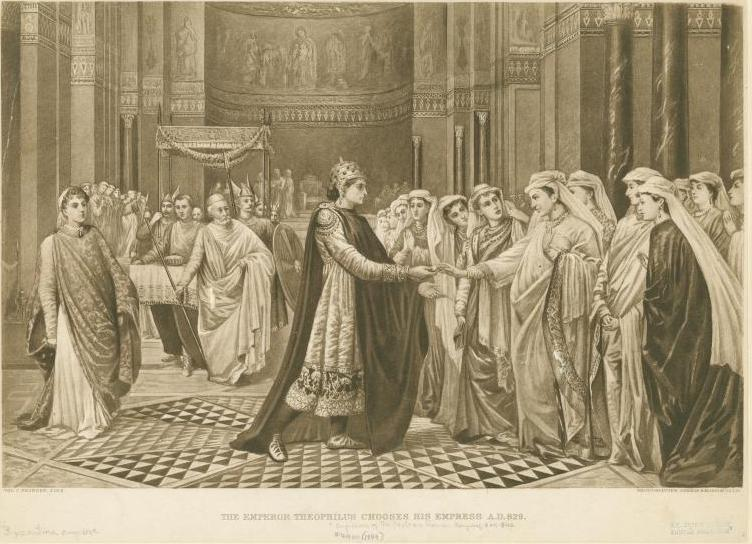
Emperor Theophilus choosing a bride (printmaking from 1889)

The Great Imperial Palace was connected by internal passages and covered galleries to the nearby Hippodrome, which served as a popular place of entertainment for the citizens and a forum where the most important state and church affairs of the entire Byzantine Empire were decided. The construction of the Hippodrome began during the reign of Septimius Severus, who destroyed ancient Byzantium, and was completed under Constantine the Great on the model of the Roman Circus Maximus. The Hippodrome was 370 meters long and 180 meters wide, its stands of forty rows accommodated more than 40 thousand spectators (according to other data — up to 100 thousand). At the very top of the amphitheater was a gallery decorated with numerous works of art, from which opened a panorama of the city. In the center of the arena, separated from the tribunes by a moat, there was a narrow terrace decorated with magnificent columns and statues brought from various countries (including the famous statue of Heracles by Lysippos and statues of Byzantine emperors). The imperial tribune rested on 24 marble columns, and above it rose a tower topped with a bronze quadriga by the same Lysippos. (Note: The Romans first took this sculpture from Corinth, then it went to Constantinople and from there to Venice, where it decorated the portal of St Mark's Basilica.)

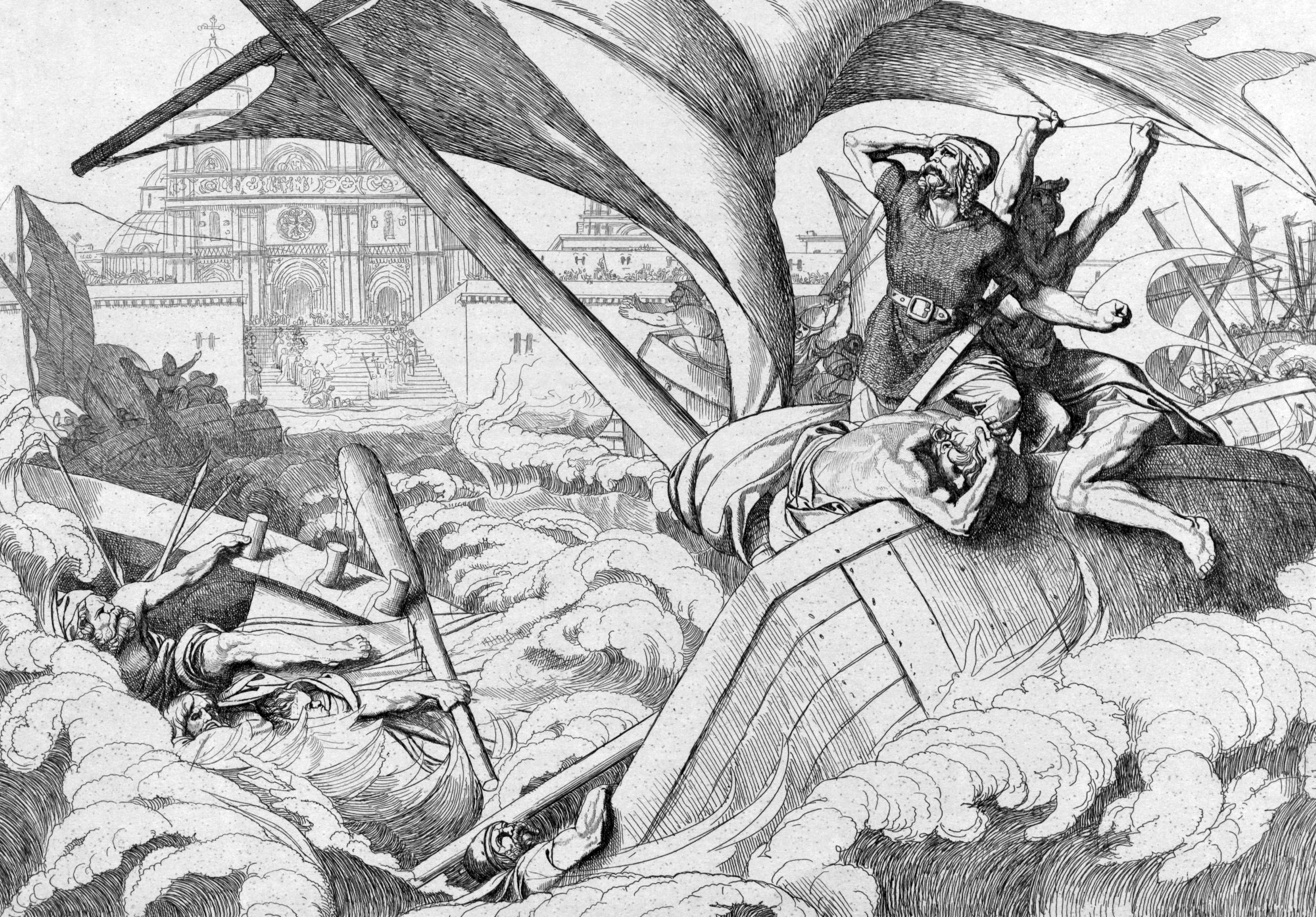
The death of the Russian fleet at Tsargrad. Print by Fyodor Bruni. 1839

From the middle of the 9th century considerably expanded and took an important place in the trade of Constantinople relations with the Slavic folks (through the Greek cities of the Black Sea region), South Caucasus and the countries of Western Europe. In handicraft production, along with the labor of hired free workers, slave labor continued to be widely used. (Note: A metropolitan workshop usually consisted of workshop owners, skilled workers or assistants from among the slaves, hired laborers (mystii), and apprentices. But slave labor did not play a leading role in craft production; small free artisans and free wage laborers were central.) Among the trade and handicraft enterprises, the most prominent were the producers and sellers of fabrics (separate workshops were devoted to the resale of raw silk, spinning, weaving and dyeing of fabrics, sewing of silk and linen products). Raw materials and fabrics came to Constantinople from many countries: silk fabrics —from Damascus and Baghdad, woven fabrics— from Thrace, Macedonia and Bulgaria, linen — from Colchis. An important place in the business life of the city was occupied by the collegium of the Tavularians, who drew up, executed and sealed documents of various kinds (wills, contracts of purchase, sale, pledge and lease). All activities of trade and craft enterprises (including the sale of finished goods to foreign merchants) were strictly regulated and under the constant control of the Eparch of Constantinople. The officials of the eparchy's apparatus strictly monitored the quality, prices, varieties, styles and colors of manufactured goods, as well as the time and place of their sale. Among the privileged were the shops of tavoularii, jewelers, changers, and silk cloth merchants, who suffered less from the strict regulation and extortion of the officials (unlike the numerous bakers, butchers, fishmongers, weavers, dyers, tanners, and soapmakers). (Note: Individual craftsmen who were not organized into workshops lived in poverty and had to compete with the rural population that flocked to the city and with seasonal workers who moved from one workshop to another. All these categories of workers constituted the needy underclass of the city and were active participants in all the riots and disturbances of the city.) In 843, Empress Theodora, who ruled under her young son Michael III, finally restored iconoclasm. Iconoclasm, which divided society into warring factions, became dangerous for the authorities. Later, the role of patriarchs in the political life of the country increased again, they not only actively intervened in solving urban problems of Constantinople, but also played an important role in national affairs. During the reign of Michael III, the influence of the Armenian court faction increased once again, and it now competed with another Armenian faction. (Note: The emperor himself was the son of Armenian Theodora, and in a certain period all affairs in empire were conducted by his relatives —Armenians— Caesar Bardas and commander of armies Petronius.) In the summer of 860, during the emperor's campaign against the Arabs, Siege of Constantinople has undertaken Rus' people under the command of Kiev princes Askold and Dir. On two hundred rooks they have reached the capital of Byzantium called by them Tsargrad, have plundered vicinities, but to begin full-fledged siege of city have not had time. According to one version, strong storm has destroyed almost all ships, and only few soldiers managed to be rescued and to return home. On other version, Russ and did not plan to participate in long confrontation and, being satisfied with rich extraction, have departed to coast of northern Black Sea coast.

From the second half of the 9th century, the Byzantine Empire began an economic and cultural boom that led to an unprecedented flowering of science, literature, and art (especially architecture, painting, and miniature painting) in Constantinople. The activity of higher schools revived, and the faculties of law and philosophy of the University of Constantinople played an important role in the scientific and cultural life of the capital (the university is usually called the school founded in 855 by the emperor's uncle Bardas and the outstanding scientist Leo the Mathematician, which was located in the palace of Magnaura). In Magnaura school on the ancient model taught grammar, rhetoric, dialectics, arithmetic, geometry, music and astronomy, the basics of diplomacy and military affairs, studied the works of ancient authors. In Constantinople of this period created the theologian and writer Photios, an outstanding poet John Grammaticus and poetess Kassia of Constantinople. In May 861, the so-called Double Council took place in the Church of the Holy Apostles, which condemned the deposition of Patriarch Ignatios.

== Macedonian dynasty ==
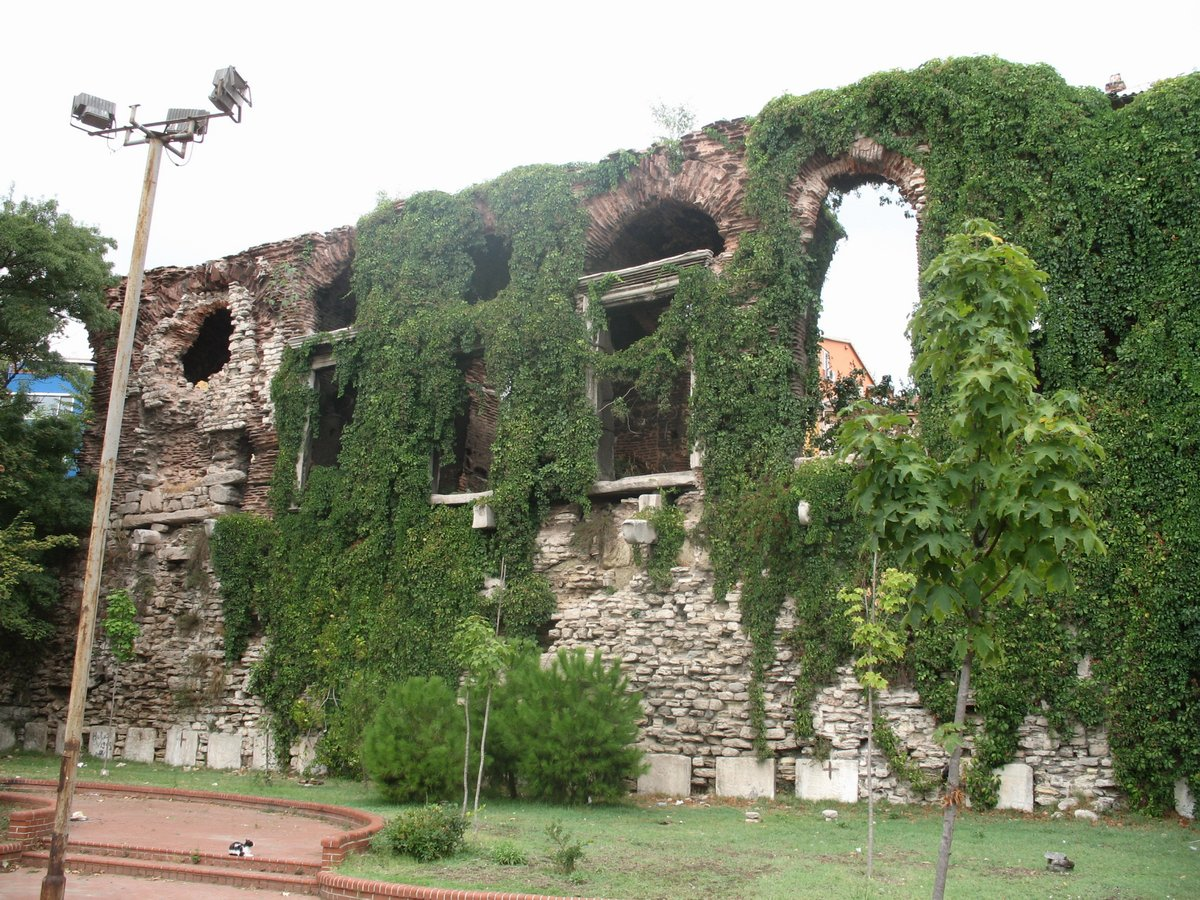
The ruins of Boukoleon Palace

In 867, Basil I of Macedonia ascended the throne, after organising the murder of his co-emperor Michael III and establishing the Macedonian dynasty (although Basil was actually an Armenian from Thrace, whose family had been captured by the Bulgarians). The new emperor liquidated all the reforms of the iconoclasts and restored the legislation of Justinian, promoted the revival of monasticism and strengthened the bureaucratic apparatus of the state. (Note: During the reign of the Macedonian dynasty, a struggle developed between the provincial military-feudal nobility, which became a carrier of centrifugal forces, and the commercial and artisan circles of Constantinople, which were interested in maintaining a strong centralized empire and had to protect their interests (the latter were supported by the emperors and numerous officials).) Under him a number of temples in the capital were repaired, including those damaged by a severe earthquake in 869, and in 880 a five-domed church "Nea Ekklesia" ("New Church") was built near the imperial palace, which became a model for Eastern Christian cross-in-square religious architecture. In 869–870, in Constantinople on the initiative of Basil I and Roman Pope Adrian II the Church Council occurred, which deposed Patriarch Photios I, although these decisions were not recognized by the Orthodox Church. In 879–880, a new council was held in the Hagia Sophia Cathedral, where the Nicene Creed was defended, but its decisions were now not recognized by the papacy.

In 907, Kiev prince Oleg started a new Rus'–Byzantine War, gathered under the command about two thousand ships (according to other sources — much less). When the Rus had appeared at Constantinople, the Byzantines had blocked an entrance in a port and had taken refuge behind its powerful walls. Oleg's armies had devastated vicinities of the capital and, according to legend, dragged ships ashore on other coast. The Byzantines preferred to start negotiations and concluded with Oleg a peace treaty, granting merchants of Kiev Rus great privileges. The Rus nailed their shields to the gates of Constantinople and have returned home with rich extractions, and Oleg for his striking success was nicknamed "prophetic", that is the magician and volkhvs. (Note: Many historians question the reality of this campaign, as it is not mentioned in any Byzantine or other source, except for Old Russian chronicles like the Primary Chronicles.) In 911, ambassadors of prince Oleg have arrived again in Constantinople and have concluded the new contract confirming all former privileges. (Note: Furs, wax, honey, fish and slaves went from Kievan Rus to Byzantium, and brocade, silk, wine and spices came back.) In summer 913 the successful campaign under walls of Constantinople had made Bulgarian tsar Simeon I formidable, thus he managed to conclude a favorable Bulgarian peace treaty (Byzantine had been forced to renew payment of a tribute, and they promised to marry the young emperor Constantine VII to the daughter of the Bulgarian governor an most importantly — officially recognized for Simeon a title of emperor). (Note: The wars with Simeon began in the late 9th century, when Emperor Leo VI moved the trade of Bulgarian merchants from Constantinople to Thessalonica. In the summer of 896, Simeon besieged Constantinople for the first time, forcing the Byzantines to pay an annual tribute and return Bulgarian merchants to the capital.)

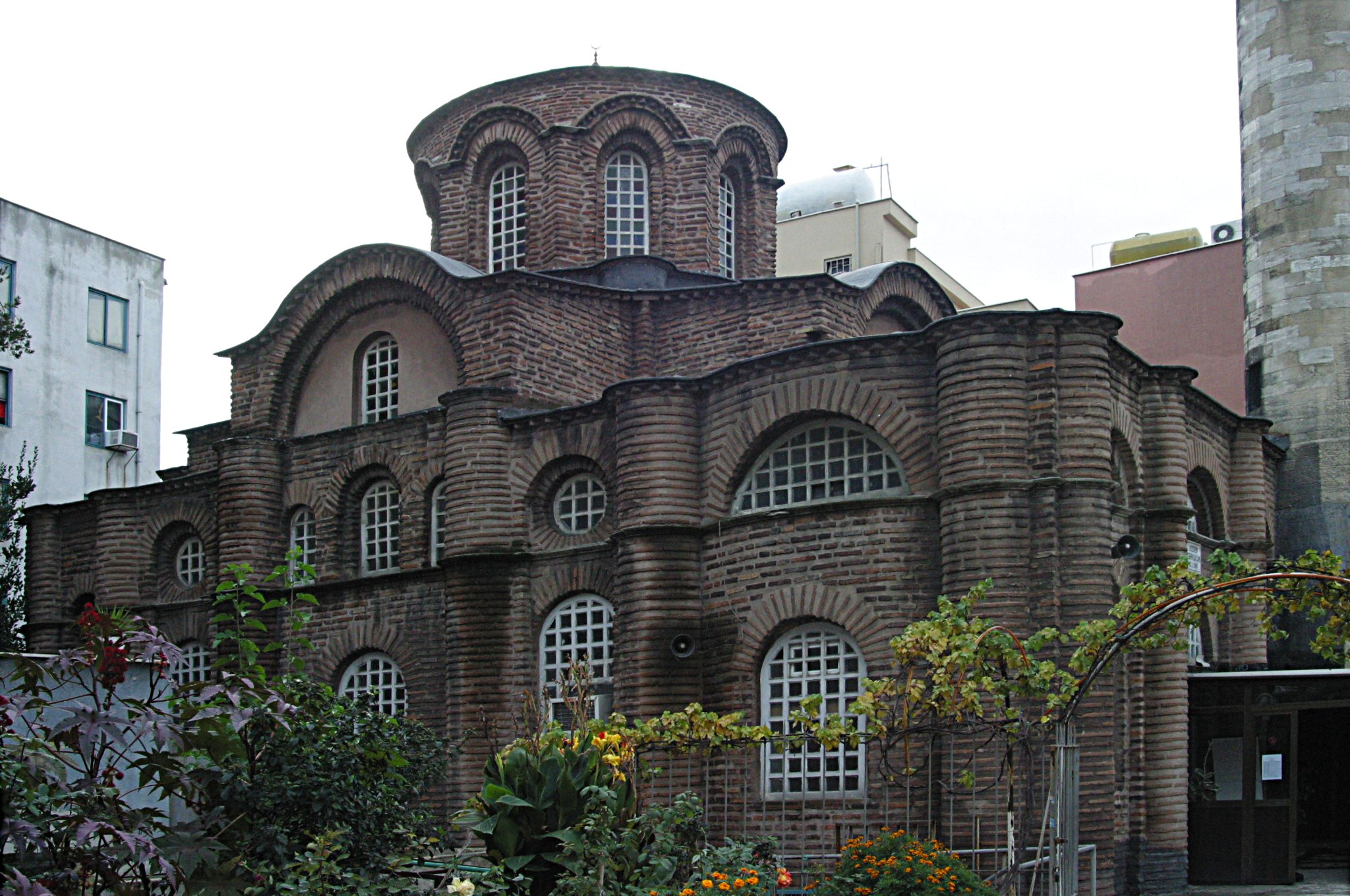
Bodrum Mosque

In the summer of 917, Simeon I inflicted a crushing defeat on the Byzantine army but was not able to take Constantinople. (Note: In 921 and 922, the Bulgarians again approached the walls of Constantinople, each time defeating the Byzantine troops. Simeon tried to enlist the support of the Arab fleet, but the Byzantines were able to intercept the ambassadors and bought off the Arabs. In 927 preparations began for a decisive siege of Constantinople, and only the death of the Bulgarian king saved the capital of Byzantium from another Bulgarian attack.) In 920, the imperial throne was occupied by the military leader of Armenian origin Romanos I Lekapenos, who has made the co-emperor three sons and the grandson, and the fourth son has put on the patriarchal throne of Constantinople. The Lekapenos moved to the magnificent palace of Myreleion, which rivaled the Great Imperial Palace in its splendor. In 932, on one of the squares of Constantinople was burned alive the leader of a large peasant revolt Basil "Copper Hand" (at the very beginning of the rebellion Basil was captured and sent to the capital, where he was cut off his hand, but he returned to his fema and made a copper hand, to which was attached a large sword). In December 944, Stephen and Constantine overthrew their father and exiled him to a monastery on the Princes' Islands, but 40 days later they were overthrown themselves and exiled to the same monastery. Romanus Lacapine and his son Christopher were buried in the Court Church of Mireleion, becoming the first emperors to be buried outside the Church of the Holy Apostles.

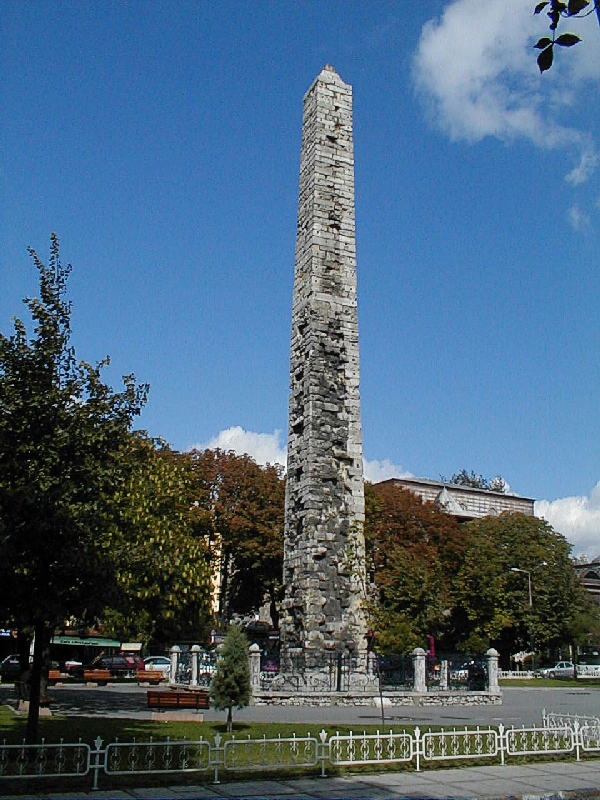
Walled Obelisk

In the summer of 941, a huge fleet under the command of Prince Igor of Kiev set out for Constantinople, but was defeated by the Byzantine squadron at the entrance to the Bosphorus with the help of "Greek fire". The remnants of Igor's forces began to ravage the coastal settlements, but were again defeated by the Byzantines and forced to return to Kiev. In 944, Igor again gathered a large army and campaigned against Byzantium, but on the banks of the Danube, imperial ambassadors persuaded the prince to sign a new peace treaty ("for all the years that the sun shines and the whole world stands"). Soon, Byzantium's relations with Russia deteriorated again, as the emperor focused his foreign policy on the Pechenegs. In 957, Princess Olga, who reigned in Russia after the death of her husband, visited Constantinople. She expressed her desire to be baptized, which was done by Patriarch Polyeuctus (Constantine VII Porphyrogenitus himself acted as the successor from the font in the rite of baptism), after which Olga was expected to receive a lavish reception in the imperial palace. In 944, Amalfi merchants were the first Italians to establish their settlement in Constantinople, on the southern bank of the Golden Horn (their example was followed in 992 by the Venetians, who settled to the west of their compatriots, followed by Pisan, Genoese, Germanic, Marseille, Narbonne and Spanish merchants).

By the middle of the 10th century, the long and arduous struggle with the Arabs had reached a turning point in favor of the Byzantines. The collapse of the Abbasid Caliphate allowed Byzantium to regain control of Crete, part of Asia Minor, Syria, and Upper Mesopotamia, to strengthen its influence in Armenia and Georgia, and to establish its eastern border along the Tigris and Euphrates. But in the west, the Byzantines suffered long defeats in wars with the Bulgarians. After the adoption of Christianity by Russia, trade and political relations between Constantinople and Kiev became much stronger, and the trade route along the Dnieper (the so-called from the Varangians to the Greeks route) became increasingly important. Every year in spring in the capital of Byzantium through Kiev were sent large trade caravans from many northern cities of Russia, and in Constantinople Monastery of the Holy Mamant there was quite significant merchant colony of Rus people. (Note: During this period, merchants from Russia were important suppliers of Eastern goods, and silk fabrics from Constantinople were called "Russian fabrics" in Western Europe.)

In 967, an angry mob, unhappy with rising taxes and speculation in the sale of bread, stoned the unpopular emperor Nicephorus II Phocas at the Gate of the Fountain. In December 969, Nicephorus was brutally murdered in his bedroom, after which his nephew John I Tzimiskes ascended the throne (in an attempt to atone for the murder of his predecessor, John removed all conspirators from the court, including Theophano, gave his property to the poor, and founded a hospital for lepers, where he often bandaged the wounds of the sick himself). In 986, many temples and palaces of Constantinople, including the Hagia Sophia, have suffered as a result of a strong earthquake. In 987, the military commander Bardas Phokas the Younger (nephew of the late emperor Nikephoros II) has risen rebellion, has proclaimed himself emperor, has seized almost all Asia Minor and has approached from the east to Constantinople. At the same time the capital was threatened from the north by rebellious Bulgarians. Basil II was forced to appeal for military help to the Kiev prince Vladimir Svyatoslavich, who sent troops together with Vikings who participated in the defeat of the usurper (989). In 1028, Emperor Constantine VIII died without leaving an heir. His daughter Zoe has given out for eparch of Constantinople, has ascended to a throne under the name Roman III Argir (at it the rich monastery of the Virgin Perivlepta in area Samatya was based). In 1034, Romanos III was strangled in the bath of the palace and the throne was occupied by Michael IV the Paphlagonian, the favorite of Zoe, who organized the murder. After the overthrow of Michael V Kalaphates in 1042, a new favorite and Zoe's third husband, Constantine IX Monomachos, ascended the throne and in 1043 founded the Monastery of St. George in Mangana and the almshouse there.

In 1045, the Armenian king Gagik II arrived in Constantinople at the invitation of Constantine IX, whom the Byzantines had forced to abdicate and cede his lands to the empire. In return, Gagik received vast lands in Asia Minor and a palace in Constantinople itself, while the tax oppression of Byzantine officials and the increasing frequency of Seljuk raids forced more and more waves of Armenians to move to the western part of the empire, including the capital. Constantinople also had a significant community of Jews (Talmudists and Karaites) who lived along the sea in the Pera area. The main occupations of the local Jews were trade, the production of silk fabrics, and the dyeing of textiles (the so-called "Jewish dye" was famous throughout Byzantium). The civil rights of the Jews were extremely limited, mainly due to the old ecclesiastical laws, and many of the influential Jews officially embraced Christianity. However, within their community, which was governed by elected elders (ephors), Jews were relatively free.

In the first half of the 11th century, the long and intense struggle in the field of religious dogma between the Holy See in Rome and the Ecumenical Patriarchate of Constantinople became extremely acute. Disagreements between Patriarch Michael Kerularius and Pope Leo IX over which of them should be subordinate to the clergy of southern Italy led to the closing of all Latin-rite churches in Constantinople by order of the patriarch in 1053. In the summer of 1054, the papal legates, led by Humbert of Silva Candida, who arrived in the capital, placed on the altar of the Hagia Sophia a letter of anathema to Patriarch Michael. That, in turn, has insisted before Emperor Constantine IX Monomakh on convocation of the Church Council of the Byzantine clergy, which has betrayed to the Church curse of ambassadors of the Pope. All these actions were accompanied by bloody clashes in the streets of Constantinople between the supporters of the rightness of the Patriarch and those who supported the Pope. Thus, the universal Church was divided into the West (Roman Catholic) and the East (Greek Catholic, later known as Orthodox). The Great Schism had enormous consequences for the history of Byzantium and the fate of its capital; it led to a deterioration of relations between Constantinople and the countries of Western Europe, which was particularly noticeable during the Crusades.

During the reign of the Macedonian dynasty, Constantine VII, one of the most educated men of his time (author of the works On the Governance of the Empire, On Ceremonies and On Themes), the historians Joseph Genesius and Leo the Deacon, the philosopher Niketas David Paphlagon and the poet Christopher of Mytilene worked in Constantinople. During this period, the authorities tried to adapt the cultural heritage of antiquity to the realities of the new era, for which they sponsored the compilation of collections and encyclopedias on history, geography, agriculture, medicine and mechanics. In art, mosaics, ecclesiastical and secular painting (especially depicting the military campaigns of the emperors of the Macedonian dynasty), book miniatures, ceramics, artistic products made of ivory, stone and glass were developed. According to the Book of the Prefect written in the 10th century, the companies (shops) of argyroprats (money changers, moneylenders and jewelers, partly intermediaries and guarantors in transactions) were of great importance in Constantinople, silk merchants (especially importers of silk from Syria and Baghdad), ready-made clothes, chrism, candles and soap, silk and tyrian purple manufacturers, cloth dyers, sellers of groceries and horse harnesses, meat and fish, bakers, innkeepers and caterers.

== Doukas dynasty ==
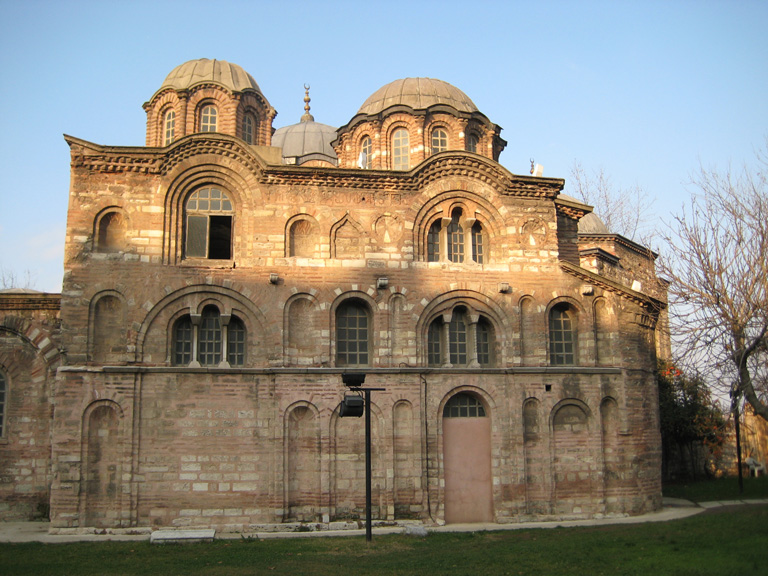
Modern view of the Pammakaristos Church

In the middle of the 11th century, Byzantines from the north began to press the Pechenegs, and from the east — Seljuks. (Note: Added to this were a series of long feudal wars and political anarchy, accompanied by frequent changes of emperor.) In 1059, as a result of palace intrigues, Constantine X Doukas ascended the throne, founding the Doukas dynasty. In the 1060s, Byzantine emperors undertook several campaigns against the Seljuks. In 1071, at the Battle of Manzikert, the Seljuks defeated the Byzantines and captured Emperor Romanos IV Diogenes, who paid a huge ransom for his freedom and ceded almost all Byzantine possessions in Asia Minor to the Sultan. During the reign of Emperor Michael VII, the Pammakaristos Church (or Our Lady of the All-Blessed) was built on the site of an older temple, which became the nucleus of the nunnery. In the fall of 1077 and winter 1078, approached the walls of Constantinople armies of rebel commander Nikephoros Bryennios the Elder and his brother John, but each time loyal to the emperor detachments reflected attack. In March 1078, other rebels, proclaiming the emperor an experienced commander Nikephoros Votaniata, seized the palace and forced Michael VII to abdicate, exiling him to the monastery of Studi. The entire short reign of Nikephoros III was marked by rebellions and ended with his abdication in favor of his own general, Alexios Komnenos.

In the middle of the 11th century, the outstanding philosophers Michael Psellos and his disciple John Italus and the writer Kekaumenos worked in Constantinople. During this period, the Byzantine capital still retained its importance as a world trade center, although it faced stiff competition from the fairs held in Thessaloniki. Ships and land caravans flocked to Constantinople, bringing furs from Russia, silks from Greece, fabrics from Italy, carpets from Spain, jewelry and glassware from Palestine and Egypt. There was active trade with Bulgaria, Syria, Trabzon, and Armenia.

== Komnenos dynasty ==
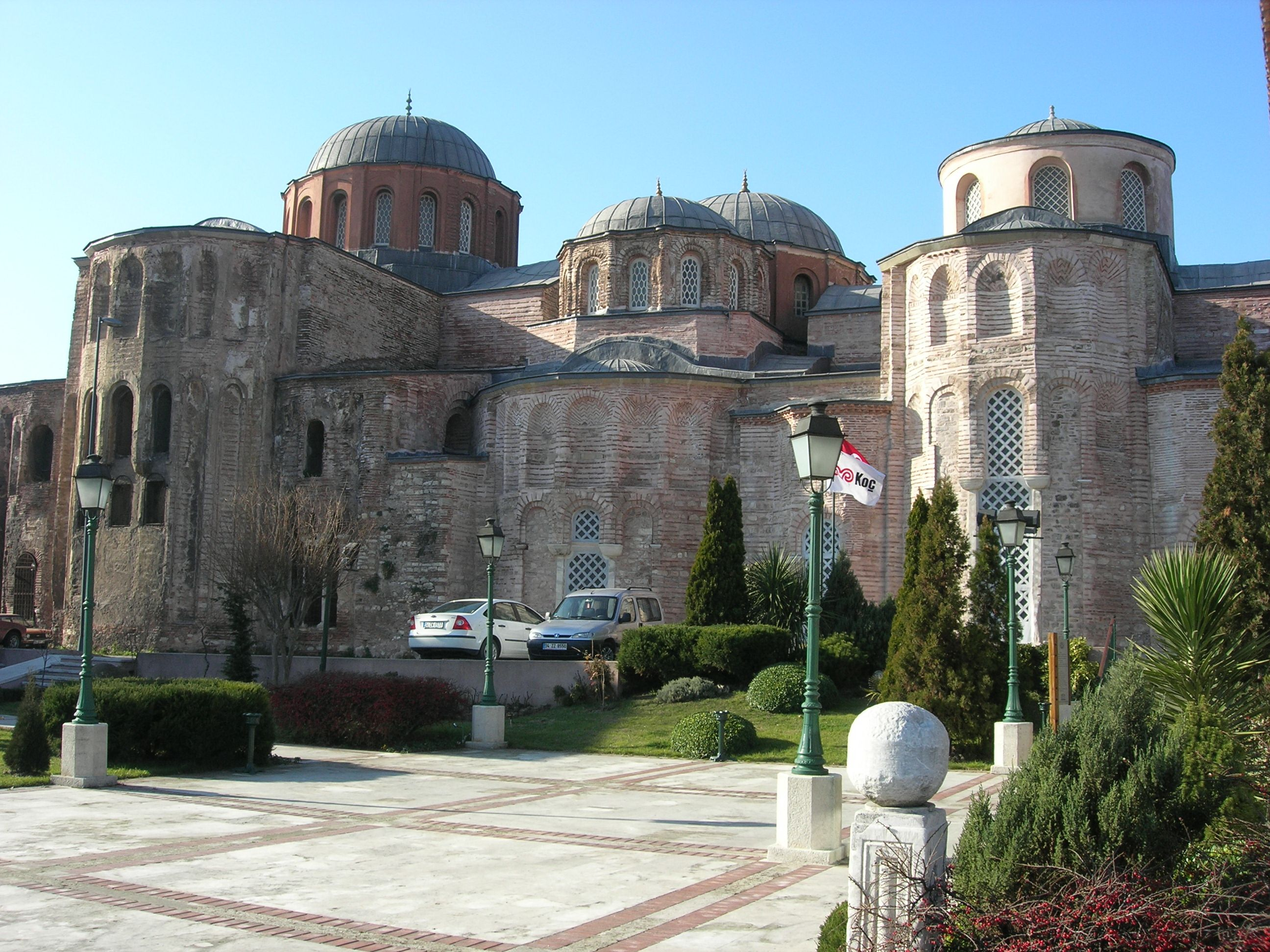
Monastery of the Pantokrator

In the spring of 1081, the troops of the rebellious commander Alexios Komnenos, thanks to the treachery of Germanic mercenaries guarding the gates, conquered and plundered Constantinople. Having become emperor, Alexios I has transferred the residence from the old imperial palace, laid down still Constantine Great, in Vlacherna Palace, built in the northwestern part of the city near the Golden Horn. The emperor's mother, Anna Dalassina, founded at the foot of the Fourth Hill nunnery with the temple of Christ Pantepopta (All-Seeing), where the crown of thorns and the nail used during the crucifixion of Jesus Christ were kept, and rebuilt the Atik Mustafa Pasha Mosque, (Note: This church was also known as the Church of the Holy Apostles Peter and Mark. It was built on the site of the house where the Virgin's veil was stolen from Jerusalem by two Byzantine patricians was originally brought.) and the mother-in-law of Alexios I, Maria Duca, rebuilt the church of Chora. In 1091 to walls of Constantinople armies of Pechenegs and allied with them Balkan Slavs have approached, but Alexey I with the help of Cumans has managed to defeat the enemy. In the spring of 1097 Constantinople became a place of gathering of detachments of crusaders from the countries of Western Europe, which participated in the First Crusade (the city had long served as a staging post for caravans of Christian pilgrims who followed along the Rhine and Danube through Asia Minor to the Empty Tomb). There were several skirmishes between the knights and the Byzantines stationed at the walls of the capital, and the Catholic poor who flooded the city began to organize noisy riots in Constantinople. (Note: The poor troops, thinned out during the campaign, reached Constantinople first and, after crossing into Asia Minor, were easily defeated by the Seljuks. The few thousand survivors, led by Peter the Hermit, panicked and fled back to Constantinople, where they waited for the main army to arrive.) After long and complicated negotiations with the crusader leaders, Alexios I managed to escort the troublesome guests out of the city. The Byzantine fleet ferried the crusaders to the Asian shore of the Bosphorus, and they continued on their way to Jerusalem. Byzantium's relations with the crusader states formed in the East (the Kingdom of Jerusalem, the Principality of Antioch, the County of Edessa, and the County of Tripoli) were tense and never escalated into military clashes.

In 1124, John II Komnenos built a church on the territory of the Zeyrek Mosque, founded by his wife Irene, which included a library and a hospital (later this monastery church became the tomb of several emperors of the Komnenos and Paleologos dynasties). In 1143, Manuel I Komnenos, who feared the neighborhood with the restless Hippodrome, finally turned the rebuilt Vlakhern Palace into a new imperial residence. The huge ensemble of more than 300 thousand m² included several palace buildings and churches, surrounded by gardens and parks. (Note: Around this period, the large underground Prison of Anemas was built next to the palace, the ruins of which are located in the modern Balat neighborhood.) In addition, all the neighboring temples and monasteries became the subject of special imperial care, especially the church of Chora. Manuel did not forget the church of Christ Pantocrator, where he brought from Ephesus a stone highly venerated by Christians, on which the body of Jesus, taken down from the cross, was wrapped in an epitaphios.

The Bulgarian Bogomilism continued to be a great problem for the Byzantine authorities. It was not without reason that in only twenty years (from 1140 to 1160) four church councils were convened in Constantinople to refute the "Godmil heresy". The hostile attitude of the population of the Empire towards the Crusaders became even more pronounced during the Second Crusade, when the Byzantine lands were plundered, and in the autumn of 1147 the violent crowds of Germans really threatened Constantinople. This forced Manuel I to take an unprecedented step — to make an alliance with the Sultanate of Rum, and then quickly ferry across the Bosphorus, first the Germans, then the French. During the Crusades, the influence of Genoese and Venetian merchants in Constantinople increased sharply, competing successfully with the capital's merchant and artisan circles. (Note: This process began with Alexios I Komnenos, who in 1082 signed the so-called "Golden Bull", which gave the Venetians complete freedom to trade in the Byzantine Empire and exemption from taxes in exchange for the protection of the Adriatic Sea from the Normans.) The Byzantine emperors more than once resorted to the help of the powerful Venetian fleet, and after the conclusion of the alliance with Venice in 1187, they generally reduced their naval forces to a minimum, relying entirely on the support of allies. Along the coast of the Golden Horn were the richest neighborhoods of the capital, owned by natives of Venice, Genoa, Amalfi and Pisa. The Italian colony of Constantinople numbered about 60 thousand people. The Latins were the backbone of the authorities, they occupied important posts in the army and played a prominent role in the emperor's entourage, while not hiding the contemptuous attitude towards the bulk of the Byzantines.

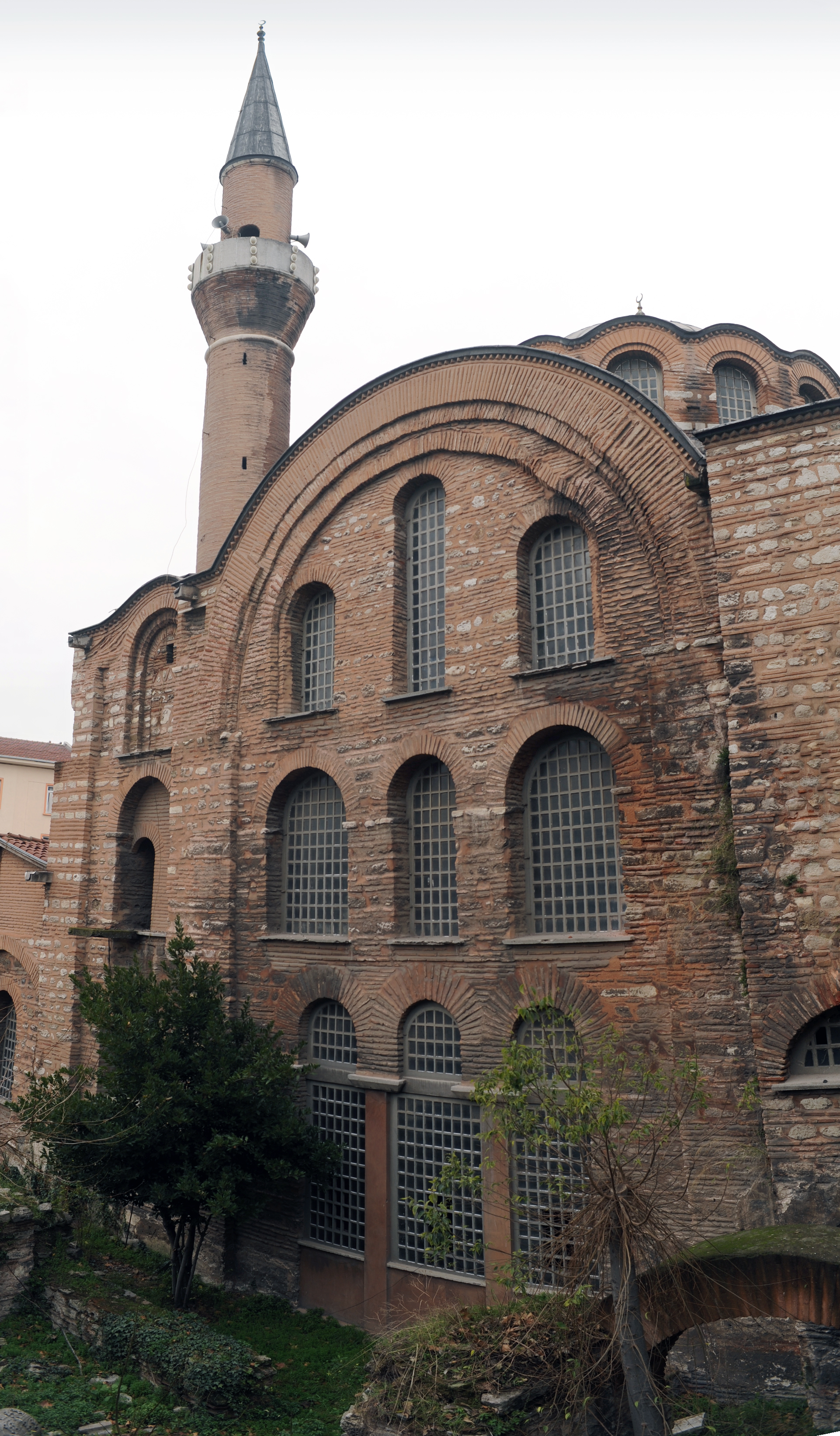
Kalenderhane Mosque

When the Italians settled in the seaports of the Levant, they forced the Byzantine merchants out of the intermediary trade with the East. Henceforth, goods from Egypt, Syria, Iran, and India began to bypass Constantinople and reach the markets of Western Europe (especially the courts of the rulers of Italy, France, and Germany), which severely affected the revenues of the Byzantine treasury and eventually undermined Byzantine trade and crafts. In 1171, there was another clash with the representatives of the Italian community of Constantinople, after which Manuel I demanded compensation from the Venetians for the damage caused to the Genoese quarter. After receiving a refusal, the emperor ordered the confiscation of all the property of Venetian merchants and other Italians under the patronage of Venice. (Note: In response to repression and mass arrests of its subjects, Venice seized Dubrovnik and Chios.) After the death of Manuel I (1180), the struggle between the claimants to the throne flared up. In the spring of 1181, it escalated again, and the streets of Constantinople erupted in fighting. Participants of the revolt smashed houses of aristocrats and rich people and burned tax lists. The citizens were dissatisfied with the ever-increasing taxes and salaries of imperial officials, as well as the dominance of foreign merchants and mercenaries in the capital, who were often used by the authorities to suppress riots. In May 1182, crowds of Greeks began attacking the homes of wealthy Latins, organizing a Massacre of the Latins in Constantinople. Catholic homes were looted and burned, as were their warehouses, churches, hospitals, and almshouses. Prosperous Italian neighborhoods were reduced to rubble. Enraged Byzantines burned houses or killed thousands of Latins in the streets, including priests, monks, and even the papal legate. When some of the Latins tried to escape the massacre on their ships in the harbor, they were destroyed by "Greek fire".

Several thousand surviving Latins were sold into slavery to the Seljuks. The Italians, who had left Constantinople before the massacre, began to ravage the Byzantine settlements on the shores of the Bosphorus and the Princes' Islands in retaliation. In addition, they began to spread the news of the tragic fate of the Latins in Constantinople, calling on the Catholic West to retaliate, which further intensified the enmity between Byzantium and the states of Western Europe. Taking advantage of the popular revolt, the throne was seized by Andronikos I Komnenos, a representative of the Comnenus side line. He somewhat eased the tax oppression, limited the power of the great feudal lords (dynates), simplified the bureaucratic apparatus, and began to fight against the abuses of officials. Andronikos I patronized Byzantine merchants, promoted some revival of trade and crafts in the capital, fought against pirates. Under him, the construction of houses, aqueducts and fountains was revived in Constantinople. During his short reign, Andronikos I uncovered several court conspiracies and suppressed a number of rebellions, dealing cruelly with the rebels, but was nevertheless deposed by his cousin and died a martyr's death.

During the reign of the Komnenian dynasty, Constantinople experienced the so-called Komnenian cultural restoration. The historians Anna Komnene, Nikephoros Bryennios the Younger, John Skylitzes, Joannes Zonaras, and Eustathius of Thessalonica worked in the city, and the satire Timarion was created, which mocked Byzantine mores and customs under the guise of traveling to the afterlife.

== The Angelos dynasty and the Fourth Crusade ==
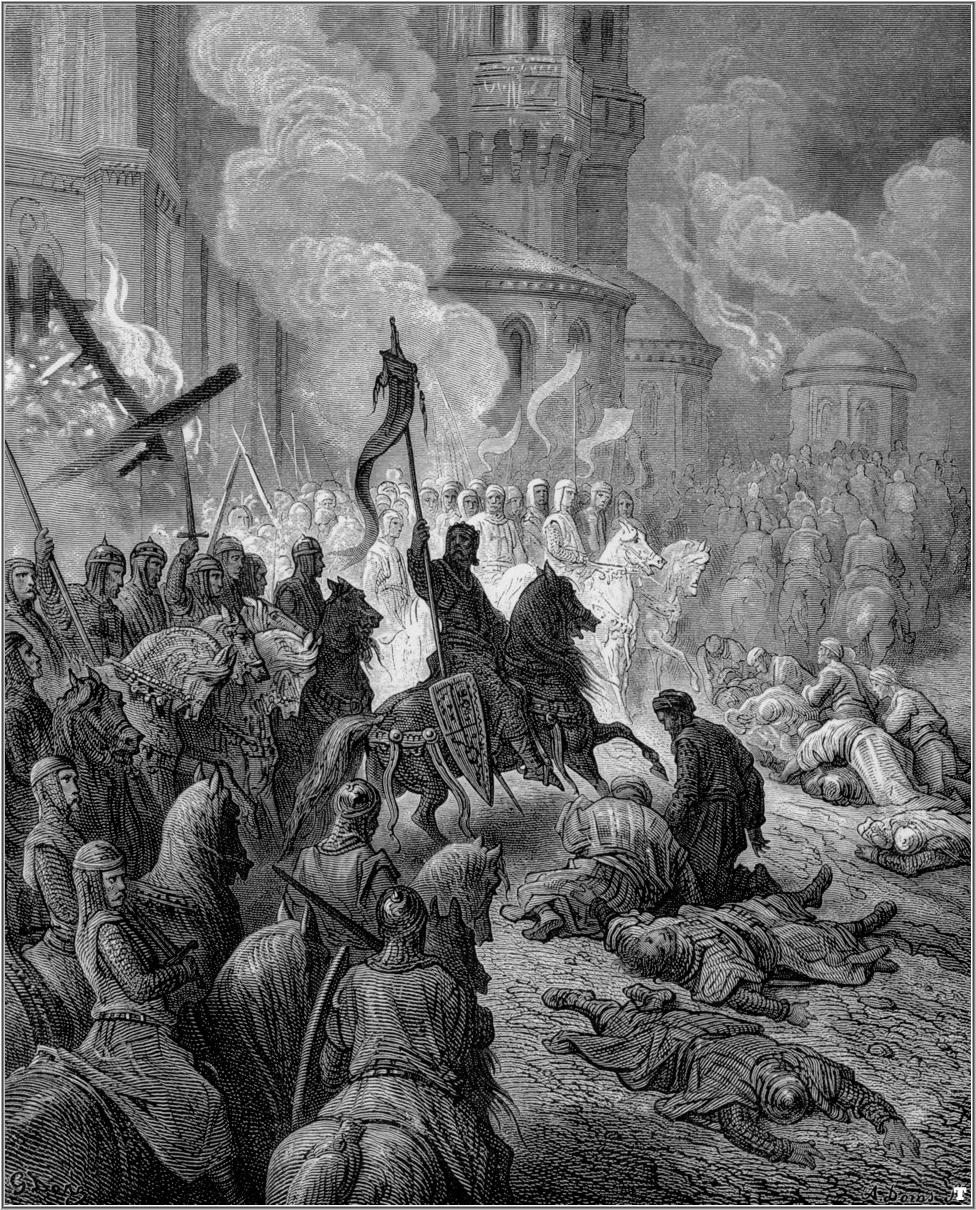
Crusaders entering Constantinople. Engraving by Gustave Doré, 1877

In 1185, Isaac II Angelos ascended the Byzantine throne and began the Angelos dynasty. With the help of the rebellious people, he broke the resistance of the Varangian Guard and captured the Great Imperial Palace, which was soon looted by the plebeians. After moving to the Blachernae Palace, Isaac subjected his deposed predecessor to terrible abuse and elaborate torture, from which he died. In 1195, Isaac was dethroned, blinded, and imprisoned by his brother Alexeos III Angelos. Isaac's son Alexios IV Angelos managed to escape from Constantinople in 1202 and appealed to European rulers for help, which became the formal pretext for a large-scale campaign against Byzantium (the Crusaders, on a campaign against the Christian state, positioned themselves as fighters for the restoration of the power of the legitimate emperor who had been overthrown by the usurper).

The Fourth Crusade, which proved fatal for the Byzantine Empire and its capital, was organized by the Venetians, for whom the Byzantines were the main trade rivals in the East. Now Constantinople was no longer a staging post, but an immediate target of the invaders. Among the Western European military feudal nobility, there was an ingrained belief that one of the main reasons for the failure of the Crusades was the hostility of Byzantium. In addition, anti-Byzantine sentiment, skillfully fueled by memories of the recent massacre of Latins in Constantinople, and stories of the untold riches of the Byzantine capital fueled the imagination and greed of the crusaders. Thus, the original plan of the Fourth Crusade, which called for a maritime expedition on Venetian ships to Egypt, was changed and the crusader army was moved to Constantinople (a major factor in this change was the policy of German feudal lords and Pope Innocent III, who sought to subjugate the Church of Constantinople).

In June 1203, Crusader ships approached Constantinople, which was deprived of the main means of defense that had saved it many times before - its own strong fleet. Alexios III tried to organize the defense of the city from the sea, but the Crusader ships broke through the massive chain and blocked the entrance to the Golden Horn. Knights led by the blind Venetian Doge Enrico Dandolo landed on the shore and camped in the Blachernae Palace. After several skirmishes with the enemy, Alexios III has fled from the capital on a wave of popular discontent, having taken with him part of the treasury. In Constantinople began mass riots, during which the crowd of citizens released Isaac II from prison and proclaimed him emperor. But the crusaders under the city walls had other plans. At their suggestion, his son Alexios IV became co-emperor of the infirm and blind Isaac, and tried to pay off the knights who had put him on the throne with high taxes.

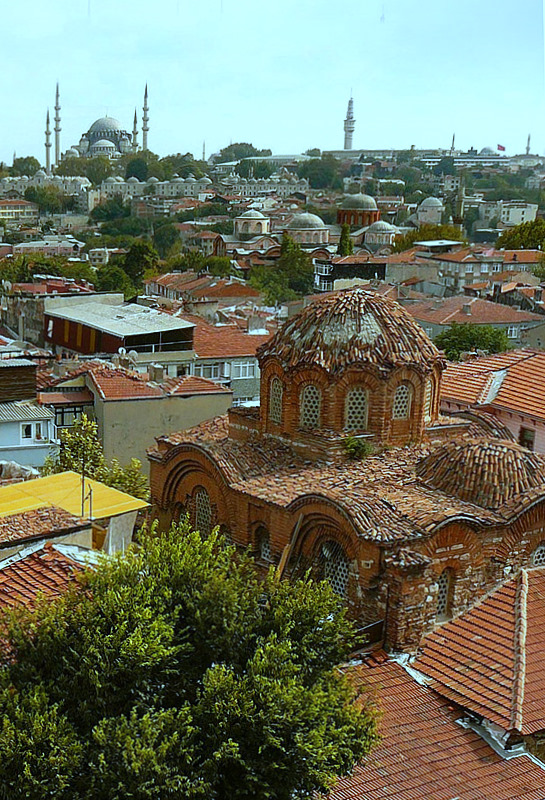
Eski Imaret Mosque occupied by the Benedictines during the Latin domination

With each passing month, the situation in Constantinople became more heated. The crusader taxation and the policy of Emperor Alexios IV, who surrounded himself with foreigners, further intensified the enmity between Greeks and Latins. In January 1204, crowds of commoners gathered in the squares to demand the removal of the angels. When Isaac II turned to the Crusaders for help, his intentions were betrayed by Alexios, who was elected the new emperor. In response to the overthrow of their protégé, the Crusaders filled in the moats in front of the walls of the Blachernae Palace and began to storm the city. On April 9, they managed to break through the defenses and enter Constantinople, but they could not stay in the city. On April 12, the assault resumed, accompanied by a tremendous fire that destroyed about two-thirds of all buildings. The resistance of the numerically superior Byzantine troops and the Imperial Guard, composed mainly of mercenaries, was broken, the city plunged into bloody street battles, and the newly crowned Emperor fled. On the morning of April 13, Prince Boniface I of Montferrat, commander of the Crusaders, entered Constantinople, which was captured by the enemy for the first time in its history.

Twenty-thousand army of crusaders began to plunder Constantinople, not limited to the promised three days (mass slaughter of the civilian population knights did not teach, but, fleeing from violence and looting, many residents of the capital itself fled the city). In June 1204, a great fire devastated the vast valley between the monastery of Christ Everget and the Blachernae Palace, occupied by neighborhoods of rich houses. In August, after another skirmish between Byzantines and Latins, fires broke out again in different places of Constantinople. Within one day, the whole central part of the city from the Golden Horn to the Sea of Marmara was burnt out, rich commercial and artisan quarters were destroyed, the famous copper, silver, silk, purple, bread and candle trading rows ceased to exist; the flames even spread to the ships in the harbor. This fire led to the complete ruin of the merchants and artisans of Constantinople, after it had lost the former importance of the trade and craft corporations, and the city itself fell off the stage of world trade for a long time.

In addition, the fires destroyed many outstanding architectural monuments and unique works of art — magnificent statues, marble columns and colonnades, churches, monasteries and palaces of the nobility. In smoking ruins lay the Forum of Constantine and the adjacent shopping streets, the famous Baths of Zeuxippus and the neighborhood of the Great Palace. The fire miraculously did not touch the Cathedral of Hagia Sophia, stopping at the temple itself. What survived the fires was plundered by crusaders and Venetian merchants. (Note: Subsequently, many historians said that the former splendor of the Byzantine churches after the Crusades could only be seen in the churches of Venice.) Gold and silverware, precious stones and carpets, furs and fabrics, marble columns and statues, dishes and icons were taken from houses, palaces and churches. The conquerors even destroyed the tombs of Byzantine emperors and patriarchs of Constantinople, breaking into massive sarcophagus. Many bronze and copper statues, as well as vessels and other church artifacts, were melted down to make coins (including statues from the Hippodrome, including some works by Lysippos). The crusader leaders occupied the surviving palaces — Vlaherna and Bukoleon, but they also suffered the fate of the looted capital. (Note: During more than half a century of rule in Constantinople, crusaders and monks managed to take almost everything of significant value to Western Europe, and the trade in stolen treasures, Christian relics and ancient manuscripts remained for a long time one of the main sources of replenishment for the Latins.)

== Latin Empire ==
Several states emerged from the ruins of the fallen Byzantine Empire. Crusaders created the Latin Empire, which included the capital Constantinople, lands along the shores of the Bosphorus and Dardanelles, part of Thrace, and a number of islands in the Aegean Sea. The first emperor of the Latins became one of the leaders of the crusade Count Baldwin I. Venetians received the northern suburb of Constantinople — Galata, as well as several cities on the coast of the Sea of Marmara, islands in the Ionian and Aegean Seas, possessions in the Peloponnese and Albania. Boniface I of Montferrat headed the Kingdom of Thessalonica, created on the lands of Macedonia and Thessaly, and William of Champlitte headed the Principality of Achaea. Some of the former Byzantine possessions remained under the control of Greek rulers, who formed the Empire of Nicaea, the Empire of Trebizond, and the Kingdom of Epirus. Forces unhappy with the foreign presence gradually began to concentrate around the Byzantine Empire. The capture and sacking of Constantinople greatly slowed the economic and cultural development of the city, which had previously experienced a period of cultural revival for nearly two centuries. Nicea became the center of Byzantine science and education, to which many scholars and teachers from Constantinople moved, including the historian and writer Niketas Choniates.

In Constantinople there was a kind of division of churches between the Catholic and Orthodox Churches. Of the 300 churches in the city, about 250 were kept by the Orthodox, 7 went to the Venetians, about 30 to the French, and 2 churches became imperial. There were also churches shared by both Orthodox and Catholics. The capital of the Latin Empire was affected by the financial problems of its rulers. Urban construction in the city almost ceased, its walls were only partially repaired. Some temples were repaired or built in the place of the previous ones, but it happened not often. At the same time, the art of book miniatures was preserved in the city. The troubadours work came from European countries to Constantinople.

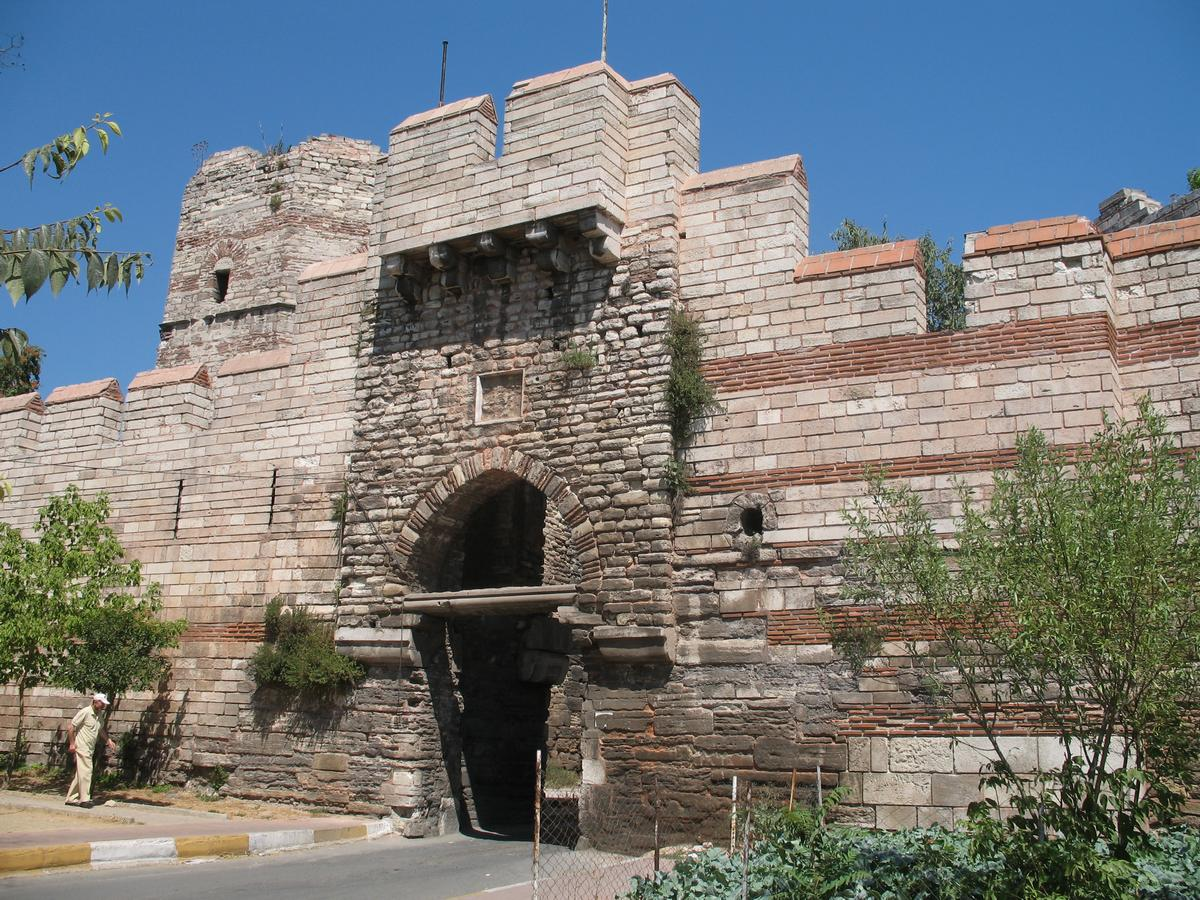
The Source Gate

In April 1205 the troops of the Bulgarian Tsar Kaloyan defeated the Crusaders at Adrianople and captured Emperor Baldwin I. His brother and successor Henry I. Flanders gathered the remnants of the troops and stopped the offensive of the Bulgarians and Polovtsy under the very Constantinople. In May, 1205 in the capital of the Latin Empire the old Venetian doge Enrico Dandolo — the main initiator and inspirer of the Fourth Crusade, and also, despite the age and blindness, the participant of the storm of Constantinople (he was buried in the Hagia Sophia Cathedral, and his tomb remained till today) has died of illness. In January, 1206 Polovtsy have settled down camp under walls of Constantinople, and Bulgarians all year devastated Thrace, taking in captivity the Greek population of cities. Only in the fall of 1206 the Latins made a campaign to Bulgaria, but in the spring of 1207 Kaloyan again besieged Adrianople. After Kaloyan's assassination by conspirators, his nephew Boril ascended to the Bulgarian throne, moving closer to the Latin Empire, which for some time had secured Constantinople from the west. However, under Ivan Asen II, the territory of the Bulgarian Kingdom expanded again almost to the capital of the Latin Empire.

The armies of the Bulgarian Tsar Ivan Aseni II and the Byzantine Emperor John III besieged Constantinople in 1235, but this campaign ended with the defeat of the Byzantine fleet by the Venetian squadron and the retreat of the allies. Subsequently, the Niceans made several more attempts to besiege Constantinople, but all ended in failure (largely due to the Venetians' naval dominance at the time). By the middle of the 13th century, the Latin Empire was in a state of complete economic decline. The Orthodox clergy was actively agitating the masses, who were suffering from fiscal oppression, taxation, and cultural and religious repression at the hands of the Latins. In the spring of 1260, the Byzantine Emperor Michael VIII Palaiologos decided to repel Constantinople and for this purpose seized Silivri, thus isolating the Latin capital from the land side. Preparing to storm Constantinople, the Greeks tried to take Galata, where the Venetians ruled, but suffered heavy losses and were forced to retreat (in addition, a sharp struggle broke out in Nicaea between rival groups of nobles, which forced Michael VIII to abandon the idea of taking Constantinople for a time). In the spring of 1261, the Emperor of Nicaea began to prepare a new campaign against the capital of the Latin Empire, at the same time securing the support of the Genoese, who helped the Greeks with money and a fleet, and the Seljuks, who helped with soldiers. (Note: The Genoese at this time were feuding with the Venetians after their expulsion from Acre and had long desired to oust them from Constantinople, while the Sultan of Konya was seeking an alliance with the Nicaean Empire against the threat of Mongol invasion.)

In July 1261, a small Nicene army under the command of Alexios Stratigopulus, reinforced by Polovtsians and Seljuk cavalry, approached the walls of Constantinople. The main Latin forces were away at sea, and the capital was guarded only by a small garrison of French and Venetians. During the night, the advanced detachment of the Greeks managed to enter the city through the old gutter, interrupting the guards and opening the gates of the source to the main forces of the attackers. The cavalry entered the sleeping Constantinople, which caused panic among the Latins. The Greek population has given support to detachments of Stratigopoulos, having forced Emperor Baldwin II de Courtenay with remnants of demoralized armies to flee from the capital on Venetian ships on Euboea (Latins have tried to beat back the city, but having seen on walls numerous forces of Greeks, so did not dare to storm and have sailed to Italy). On August 15, 1261, in holiday of the Dormition of the Mother of God, Michael VIII with a triumph has entered Constantinople through the Golden Gate, has gone to Studium monastery, and from it — to Hagia Sophia where emperor Stratigopul and patriarch Arsenios Autorian waited. Thus the Byzantine Empire under the Palaiologos dynasty was restored, but it was only a shadow of the once powerful and vast state.

== Palaiologos dynasty ==
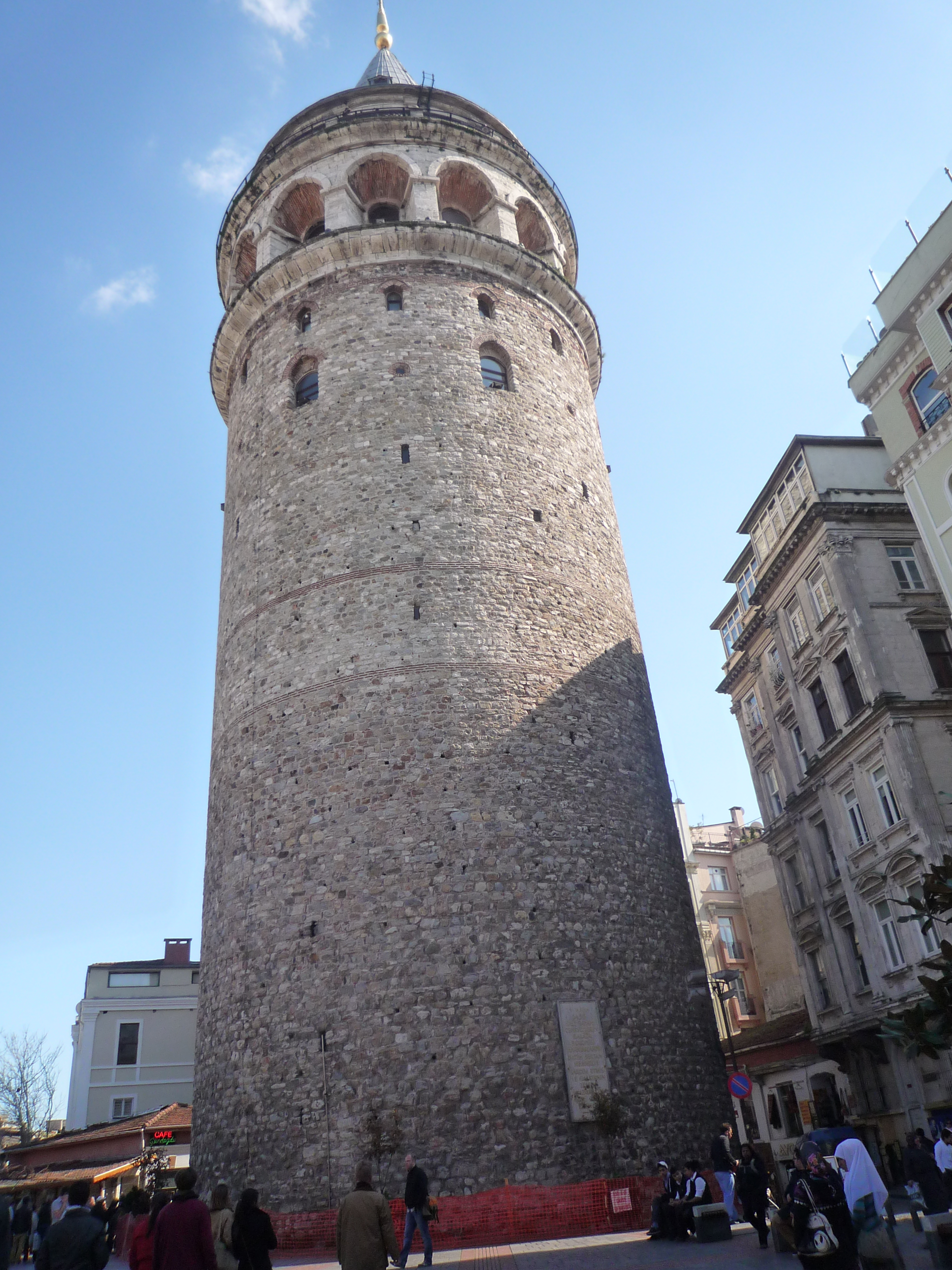
Galata Tower, built in the mid-14th century

After the expulsion of the Latins, Constantinople, once again the capital of the Byzantine Empire, only partially succeeded in regaining its former importance as the center of Byzantine culture. But neither Byzantium nor Constantinople's greatness and commercial power could return. Michael VIII made great efforts to restore the capital, but many palaces and temples remained in ruins, houses and entire neighborhoods were demolished by the citizens for stones and firewood, and once vibrant neighborhoods were replaced by wastelands, vegetable gardens, and orchards. The great imperial palace finally fell into disrepair, but the Palaiologos restored and enlarged the Palace of Blachernae, and rebuilt and luxuriously decorated monasteries of the Pammakaristos Church (under Michael VIII), Chora, Lips (Note: The church of St. John the Baptist, attached to the monastery of Lipsa, became one of the tombs of the Palaiologos dynasty.) and Stoudios (under Andronikos II). Famine among the urban lower classes and epidemics became commonplace in Constantinople. Only parts of Thrace and Macedonia, a few islands in the Aegean, certain areas of the Peloponnese, and the northwestern part of Asia Minor were under the rule of the Palaeologos dynasty. In the 13th century, the trade importance of the Black Sea straits declined, and relations with the northern Black Sea region, devastated by the Mongol conquests, were weakened.

Eventually, Constantinople became a relatively vibrant commercial hub. By the mid-14th century, the capital's markets were bustling with trade in grain, beans, dried fruits, wine, olive oil, spices, honey, salt, fish, silk, flax, wool, leather, furs, incense, soap, wax, and jewelry. The Jewish quarter, near the mouth of the Golden Horn, was famous for its trade in precious stones. Ships from Italy, Syria, Bulgaria, and Russia entered the port, but trade fees and duties, which had been the main source of income for the Byzantine treasury, were increasingly reduced. The share of local merchants in the total trade turnover was insignificant, trade (especially foreign trade) was dominated by the Genoese and Venetians. The Genoese, in gratitude for their support in the struggle against the Latin Empire, received the suburbs of Galata and Peru, which soon proved to be beyond the control of the Byzantine authorities, as well as the privileges previously enjoyed by the Venetians. The Genoese merchants were exempted from all taxes, a fortress wall with a moat was built around Galata, guarded by a Genoese military garrison, and on the top of the hill a huge Galata Tower was erected. (Note: The Galata Tower, or Christ Tower, was originally built in the late 5th century. It was used to monitor fires and ships passing through the Bosphorus. Later, the Genoese built it to its present height of 68 meters.) The more Byzantine Constantinople declined, squeezed by Theodosius' walls, the more Genoese Galata flourished.

Throughout the Palaiologos' rule, most of the Black Sea trade was in the hands of Genoese merchants (in addition, through Feodosia and Sudak, they traded with Russia, the Caucasus, Persia, Central Asia, and China, bypassing the markets of Constantinople). In the 14th century, Galata's customs revenues were almost seven times higher than the revenues of the Byzantine treasury. It came to the point that the Genoese directly prevented the revival of the Byzantine fleet so as not to break the trade monopoly of the Italians in the Straits and the Black Sea coast. When the Byzantines began to build ships in the dockyards of the Golden Horn, the Genoese simply burned them. Fearing an even greater economic strengthening of Genoa, Michael VIII in 1265 allowed Venetian ships to use the straits and enter the Black Sea. Lacking a strong fleet of their own and dependent on Genoese mercenaries, the Venetians did not wait long: in 1296 and 1297, the Venetian fleet attacked Constantinople almost unhindered and plundered the suburbs of the capital. Gradually, the Aegean, the Black Sea, and even the Sea of Marmara, where the ships of the Genoese and Venetians dominated, were almost completely out of Byzantine control.

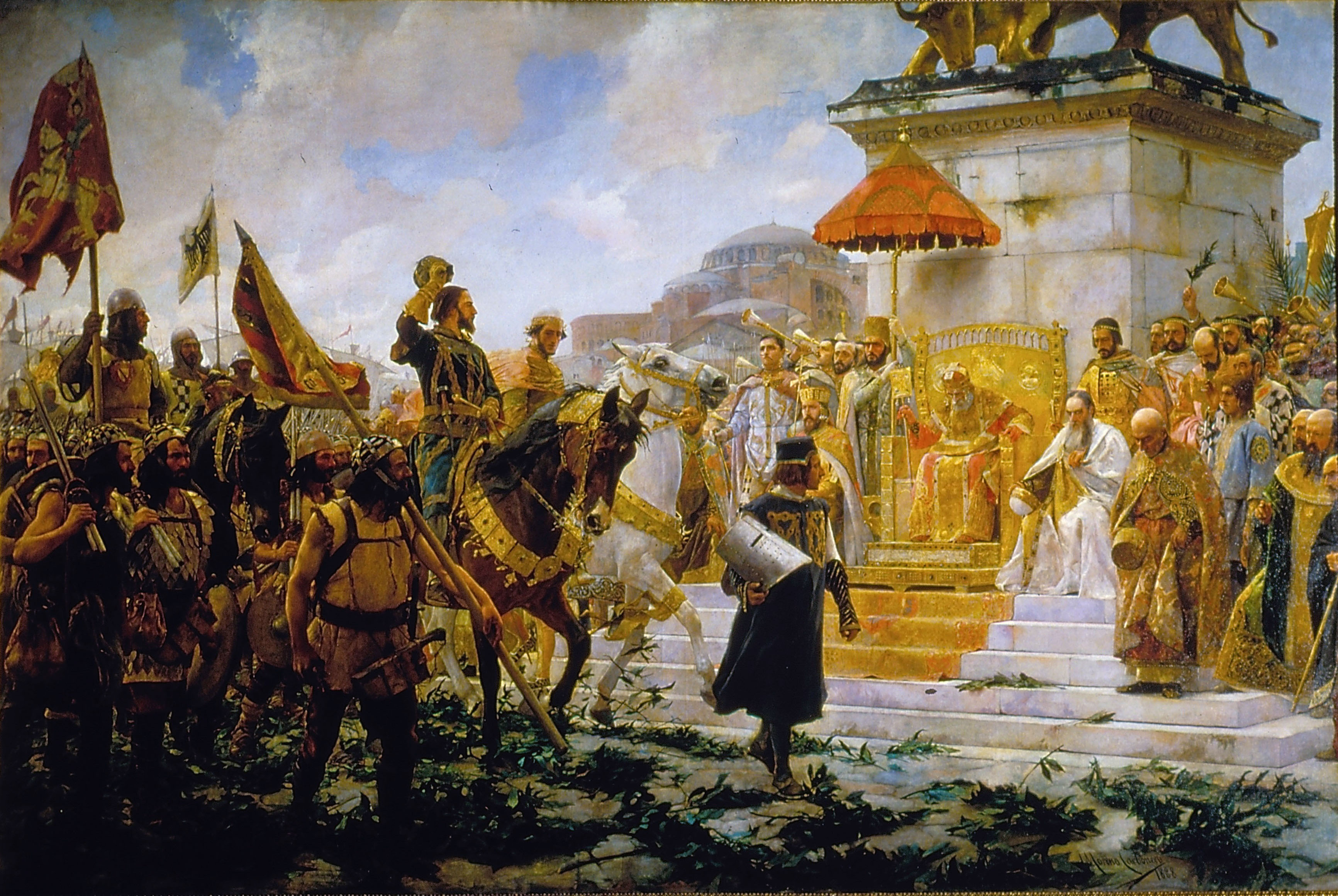
Entry of Roger de Flor into Constantinople. Painting by José Moreno Carbonero, 1888.

In 1274, the Second Council of Lyon was held, where Michael VIII concluded the so-called Union of Lyon with the Catholics. (Note: Michael VIII feared the attack of the Sicilian king, Charles I of Anjou, who, with the support of the Latin barons of the Morea and Athens, sought to seize Constantinople and restore the Latin Empire to prevent the union of Byzantium and Rome.) This union, however, met with strong opposition from the clergy and most of the Byzantine masses, who remembered well the Latin rule and the imposition of Catholicism by the invaders (especially from the inhabitants of the capital, who suffered most from the complete sacking of the city by the Crusaders). After the death of Michael VIII in 1282, his son Andronikos II Palaiologos annulled the union of the Eastern and Western Churches. In the fall of 1303, the Italian condottiere Roger de Flor arrived in Constantinople with his fleet and detachments of almogavars. In return for future help in the fight against the Ottomans, he was given the emperor's niece as his wife and the title of Megas Doux. Soon the Catalan army, which had previously won several victories over the Turks, turned to plundering the civilian population of Asia Minor. Incited by the Genoese, Michael IX Palaiologos lured Roger de Flor to Adrianople, where he and other warriors were killed by the mercenary Alans. In response, the Catalans, allied with the Bulgarian tsar, Theodore Svetoslav of Bulgaria sacked Thrace to the vicinity of Constantinople. In 1321, the powerful feudal nobility nominated the emperor's grandson Andronikos III to the throne, which led to a fierce internecine war known as the War of the Two Andronikos (1321-1325). It ended with the concession of Andronikos II, who was forced to appoint Andronikos III as his co-emperor. At the same time, the new symbol of the Palaiologos dynasty was the double-headed eagle, symbolizing the division of power between the two emperors, who were hostile to each other.

In 1326, the Ottoman Turks, led by Orhan I, captured one of the largest Byzantine cities in northwestern Asia Minor, Bursa, and made it their capital. This brought the borders of the rapidly growing Ottoman state close to Constantinople. In May 1328, as a result of a rebellion, Andronicus II Paleologus was overthrown and his friend and advisor Theodore Metochites was imprisoned in a monastery along with his disciple Nicephorus Gregoras. The unloved grandson of the deposed Emperor Andronicus III Paleologus ascended the throne, and John VI Kantakouzenos ruled all affairs during his reign. In 1341-1347, as a result of civil war, the empire was divided between two groups of nobles. Some opposed the rule of influential provincial feudal lords in Constantinople and supported the minor emperor John V, while others sided with his regent and the richest Thracian landowner, John Cantacuzin, who was also proclaimed emperor. (Note: The beginning of the open confrontation was a rebellion organized by Alexios Apokaukos in Constantinople, during which the property of Kantakuzin and his followers was plundered and confiscated, and they themselves were killed or imprisoned. After the assassination of Apokavk (June 1345), who held the post of Eparch of Constantinople, another wave of pogroms swept through the city. In the summer of 1346, the neighborhoods of the capital were sacked by Turkish troops, who had previously been hired by Anna of Savoy to fight Cantacuzin, and the city itself was severely damaged by a powerful earthquake in the same year.) In February 1347, John Cantacuzin, supported by Orkhan I, entered Constantinople. A plague soon broke out in the city, and in 1348 an armed conflict began with the Genoese of Galata, who defeated the Byzantine fleet and retained the right to collect duties from ships passing through the Bosphorus. In 1352, a new civil war broke out, during which in November 1354 the capital was occupied with the support of the Genoese, now John V Paleologos. John Kantakouzenos was forced to retire to a monastery under pressure from the citizens who were unhappy with his territorial concessions to the Ottomans. Due to numerous plague epidemics that struck Constantinople in the second half of the 14th century - early 15th century, the population of the city decreased sharply and in the 15th century did not exceed 50 thousand people. In 1362, Sultan Murad I moved his capital to Adrianople, effectively surrounding Constantinople on all sides of the Ottoman possessions. (Note: Earlier Turks thanks to John Kantakuzin established themselves in Gelibolu (1354), having started the conquest of possessions in Europe, in 1359-1360 occupied Thrace, several times closely approaching the walls of Constantinople.) The city continued to be called the capital of the Byzantine Empire, which in fact no longer existed. Under the power of the emperors, who were forced to recognize themselves as vassals of the Turkish sultans (Note: The Byzantines promised to pay an annual tribute, to provide troops during the Sultan's military campaigns, and not to undertake the restoration of Constantinople's fortifications.) were only Constantinople, insignificant territories around it, and possessions in Greece.

Map of Constantinople in the Byzantine Era (before the Ottoman conquest)

Sultan Bayezid I considered taking Constantinople, but he was occupied with wars in the west and east and did not want to divert significant forces to storm the well-fortified city. He decided to take Constantinople by force, and for seven years, beginning in 1394, he blockaded the city by land, preventing the supply of food. In addition, the Ottoman fortress of Anadoluhisar was built on the Asian side of the Bosphorus, making free navigation of the straits much more difficult. In Constantinople, a famine began, and citizens tore down entire neighborhoods of old buildings for firewood. The situation was aggravated by frequent riots and power struggles related to the struggle for the throne, during which the rival parties more than once appealed to the Ottomans or Western European rulers for help. One of the conditions for weakening the Ottoman blockade was the demand to provide mosques for the small Muslim enclave of Constantinople and to allow Muslims to sue each other before a Sharia judge (qadi) appointed by the sultan.

In 1396, European countries, frightened by the threat of Turkish invasion, organized a crusade led by the Hungarian King Sigismund, but Bayazid I's forces defeated the crusaders in northern Bulgaria at Nikopol. Sigismund managed to escape together with the Grand Master of Rhodes. They reached the Venetian ships on the Danube and then took refuge behind the walls of Constantinople. The Turks continued to devastate the surroundings of the Byzantine capital, whose situation was becoming catastrophic. At the end of 1399, Emperor Manuel II Palaiologos, seeking the support of Catholic Europe, sailed from Constantinople with his entourage. In Italy, France, England, and Spain he received a solemn welcome, sympathy, but the idea of organizing a new crusade against Bayazid did not find support among the Western European rulers.

Salvation came from where they least expected it. Tamerlane's forces invaded Anatolia from Central Asia and defeated the Ottoman army at the Battle of Ankara on July 28, 1402. Sultan Bayezid was captured and died in captivity, and his state was completely devastated, delaying the final destruction of Byzantium and the fall of its capital for half a century. As soon as Sultan Murad II succeeded in consolidating Turkish power in Asia Minor and the Balkans, he began to prepare for the capture of Constantinople. On August 24, 1422, the Ottomans set out to storm the walls of the fortress, but met with desperate resistance from the city's inhabitants. At night, Murad ordered to burn the siege towers and retreat (one of the reasons was a new rebellion of the Ottoman nobility in Asia Minor), and in 1424 signed a peace treaty with Manuel II, under which the Byzantine emperor again recognized himself as tributary to the Sultan and ceded to him a number of cities in Macedonia and Thrace. In 1427, the Genoese built the Catholic Monastery of St. Mary in Galata. In 1433 the outer walls of the city were completely rebuilt (also thanks to private donations), in 1434 a fire destroyed the Blachernae Church, one of the most revered in Constantinople. In 1439, John VIII Palaiologos obtained the consent of the Orthodox clergy to the conclusion of the Union, which actually made the Patriarch of Constantinople dependent on the Pope. At the Council of Florence, the Latins succeeded in imposing the main provisions of Catholic doctrine on the Greek church hierarchs, who, together with the emperor, hoped in return to receive help from the West in the fight against the Turks.

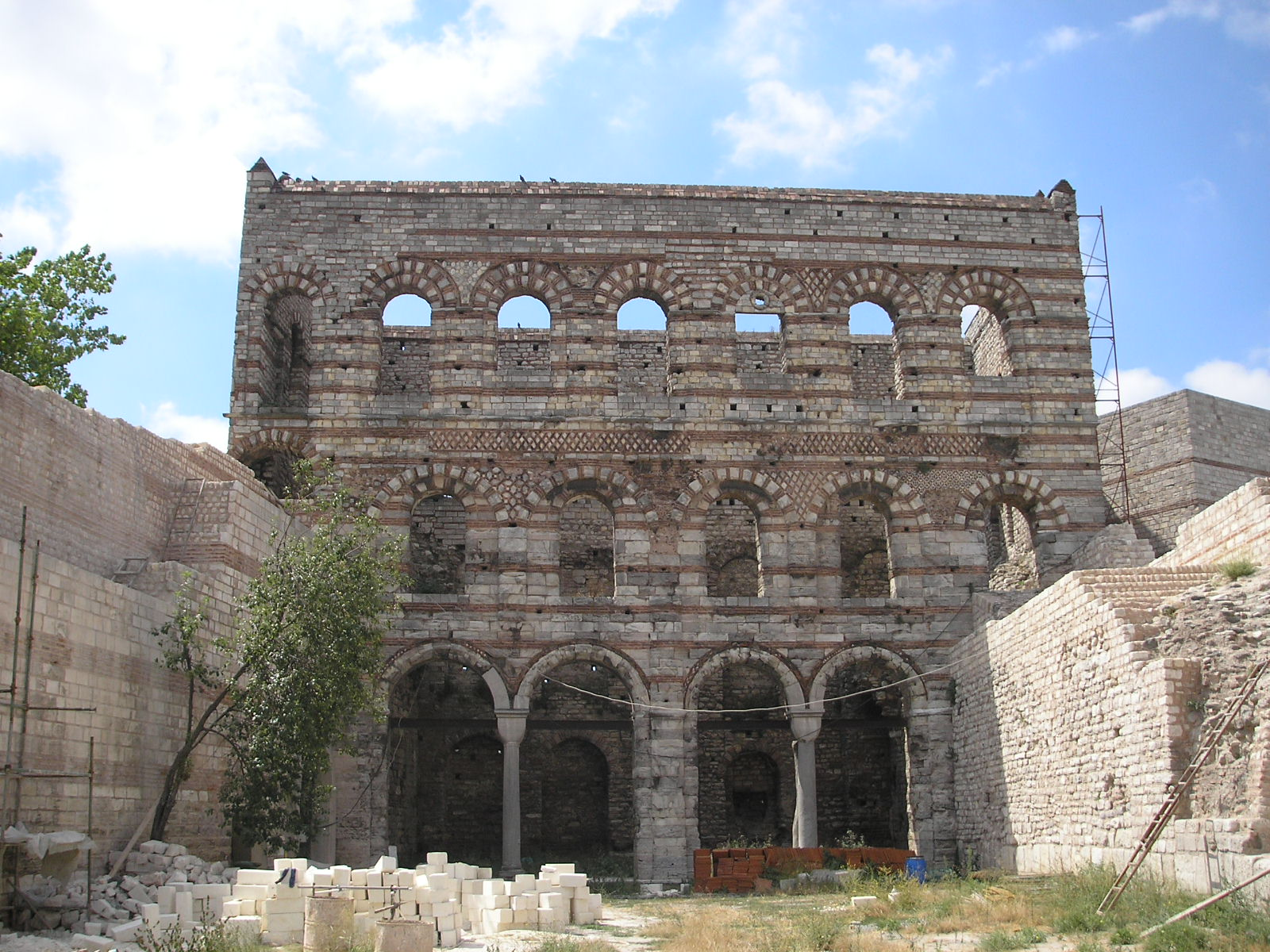
Palace of the Porphyrogenitus

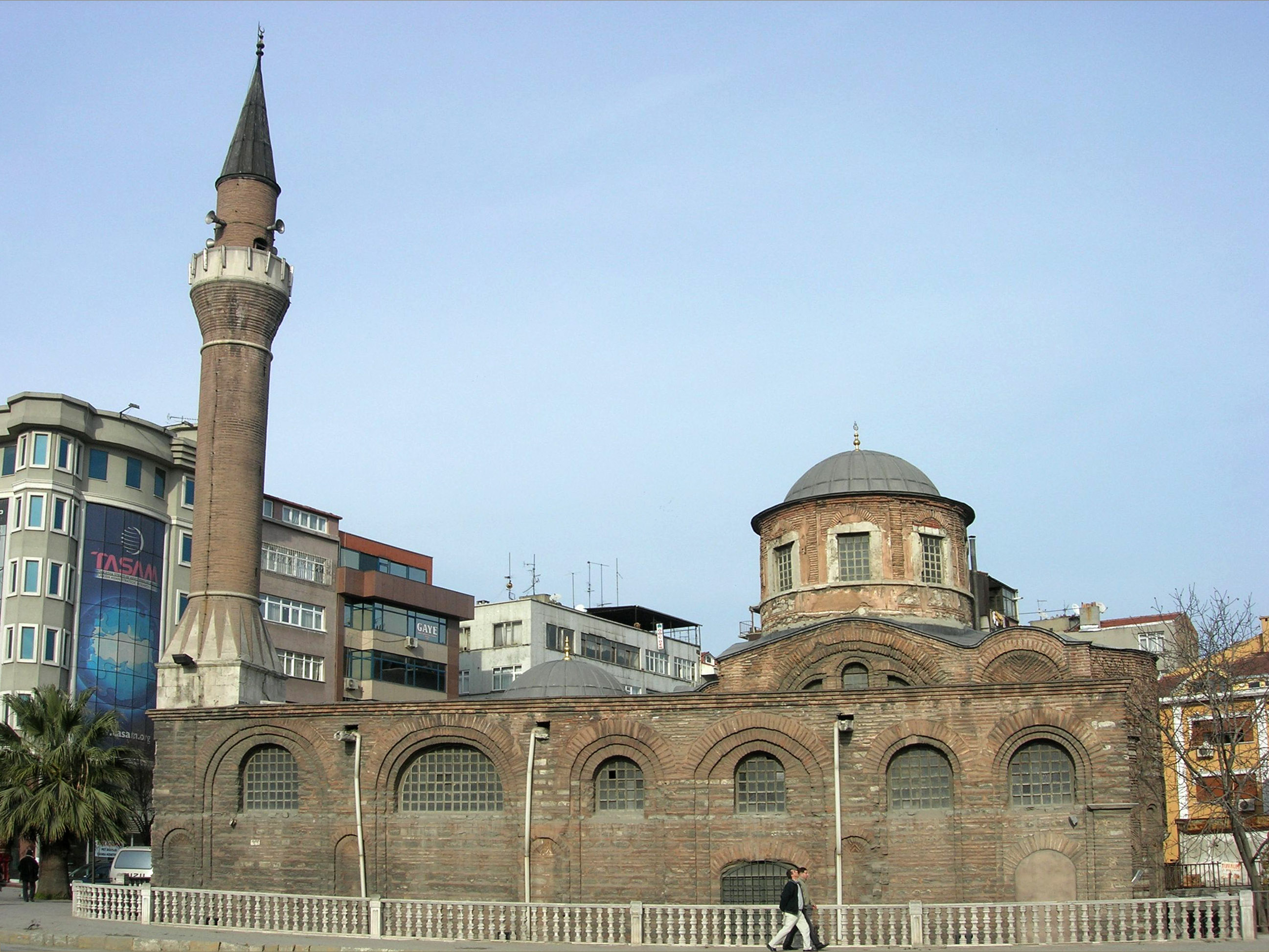
Church of Lips Monastery

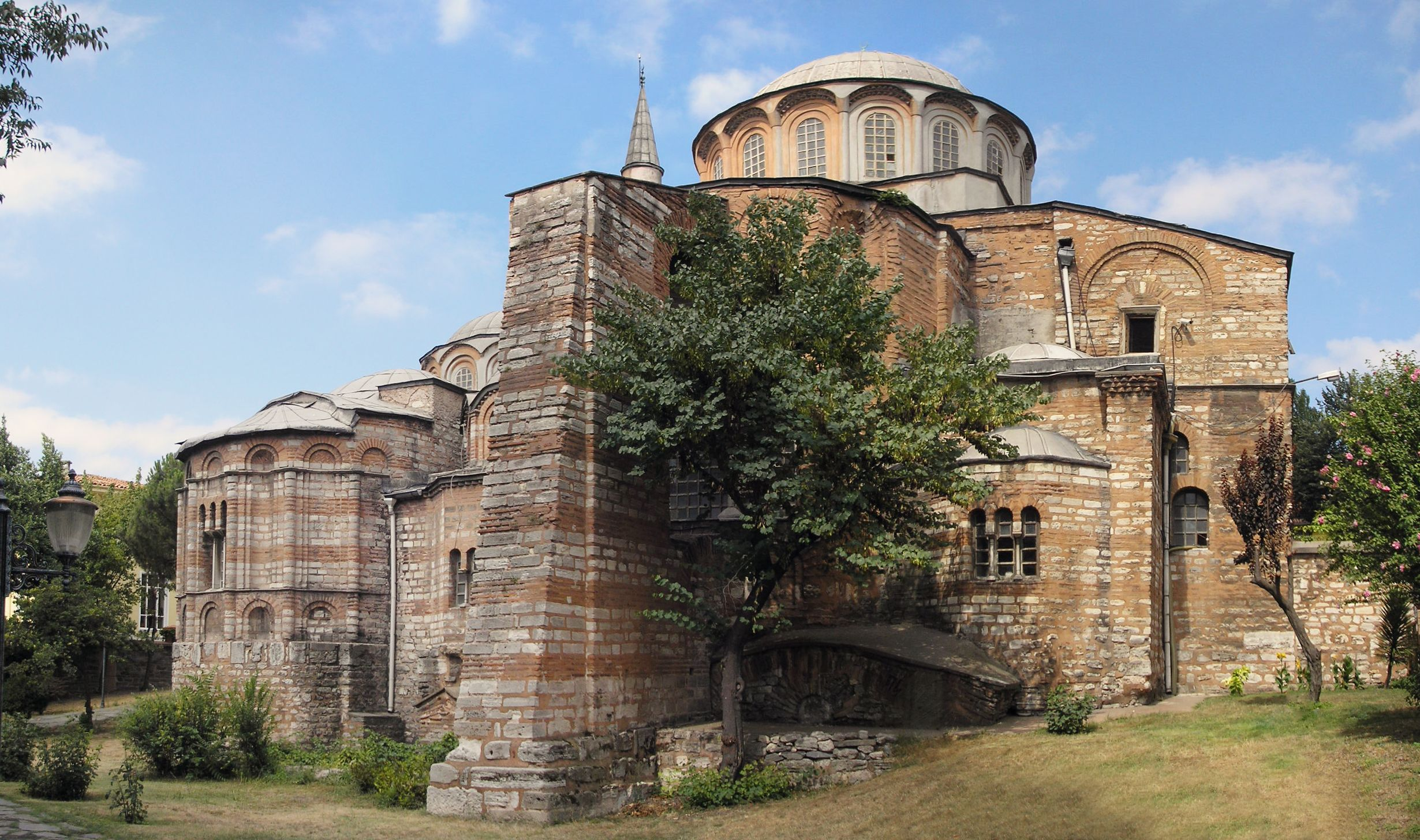
Chora Church Monastery

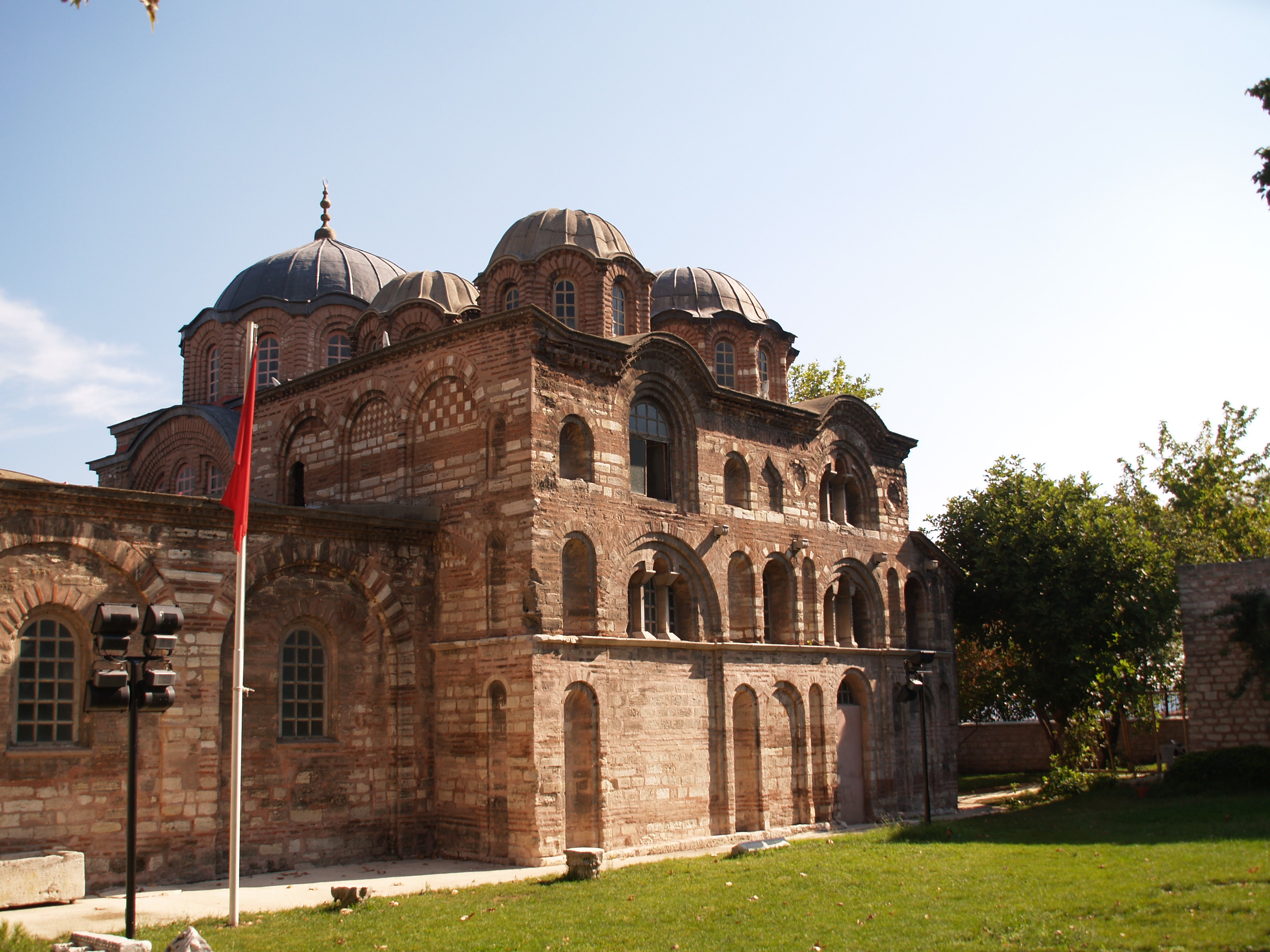
Church of Pammakaristos Monastery

The Union of Florence was rejected by the overwhelming majority of the Orthodox clergy and the masses. Many of the ambassadors who had signed the document were forced by the pressure of the crowd to withdraw their signatures immediately on their return to Constantinople. The people of the capital were extremely hostile to the Catholic Church, in their view the pope was identified with the Antichrist, and "pope" was a common nickname for dogs in the city (dissatisfaction with the union reached such a level that many citizens refused to mention the emperor-uniate in their prayers). In Constantinople, a fierce struggle broke out between the Latinophile part of the nobility and the party of opponents of the union from the most diverse strata of society (in 1450, on the wave of this confrontation, even Patriarch Gregory III, who favored union with the papacy, was forced to flee to Rome). (Note: Then Russia was released from under authority of Constantinople patriarchate.) This schism aggravated the catastrophic situation of the city, which was surrounded on all sides by Ottoman possessions. After the defeat of the Turks in the last crusade of Varna (1444), Constantinople lost all hope of salvation from the European countries. The fate of Byzantium was sealed (especially after the restoration to the throne of Sultan Mehmed II, who set himself the goal of conquering Constantinople and destroying the Byzantine Empire at any cost).

After the death of Emperor John VIII (October 31, 1448) the Byzantine throne tried to seize his younger brother Demetrios, who was the first to arrive in Constantinople, but their mother Helena Dragash bet on another son — Constantine. In January 1449, with the consent of the Ottoman Sultan, Constantine was proclaimed emperor in Mystras, and only in March he arrived in the capital (having no means, he was forced to come to Constantinople on a Catalan ship of opportunity). The situation in the city was such that, contrary to tradition, the new emperor was not crowned patriarch in the cathedral of Hagia Sophia. (Note: According to one version, the authorities feared the negative reaction of the crowd to the coronation of a Uniate emperor by a Uniate patriarch and postponed the ceremony for a long while.) Despite the fact that Constantinople continued to play the role of a major trading center until the opening of the sea route to India, and in the hands of Byzantine merchants still had considerable wealth, despite the birth of manufactures in the city and the emergence of strong usurious capital, the Byzantine economy and urban life of the empire was in decline. The arrival of foreign goods, the domination of Italian merchants and the weakness of the domestic market led to the ruin of many local craft production and usury. The Venetians, who revived their quarter in the coastal area of Plataea (slightly above the place where the old quarter was located), had in Constantinople their own churches, warehouses, workshops, self-governing bodies and even their own autonomous court, independent of the decisions of the emperor and his government. Turkish merchants, who often came to the city, were also subject to the local Ottoman official, who was accountable only to the Sultan.

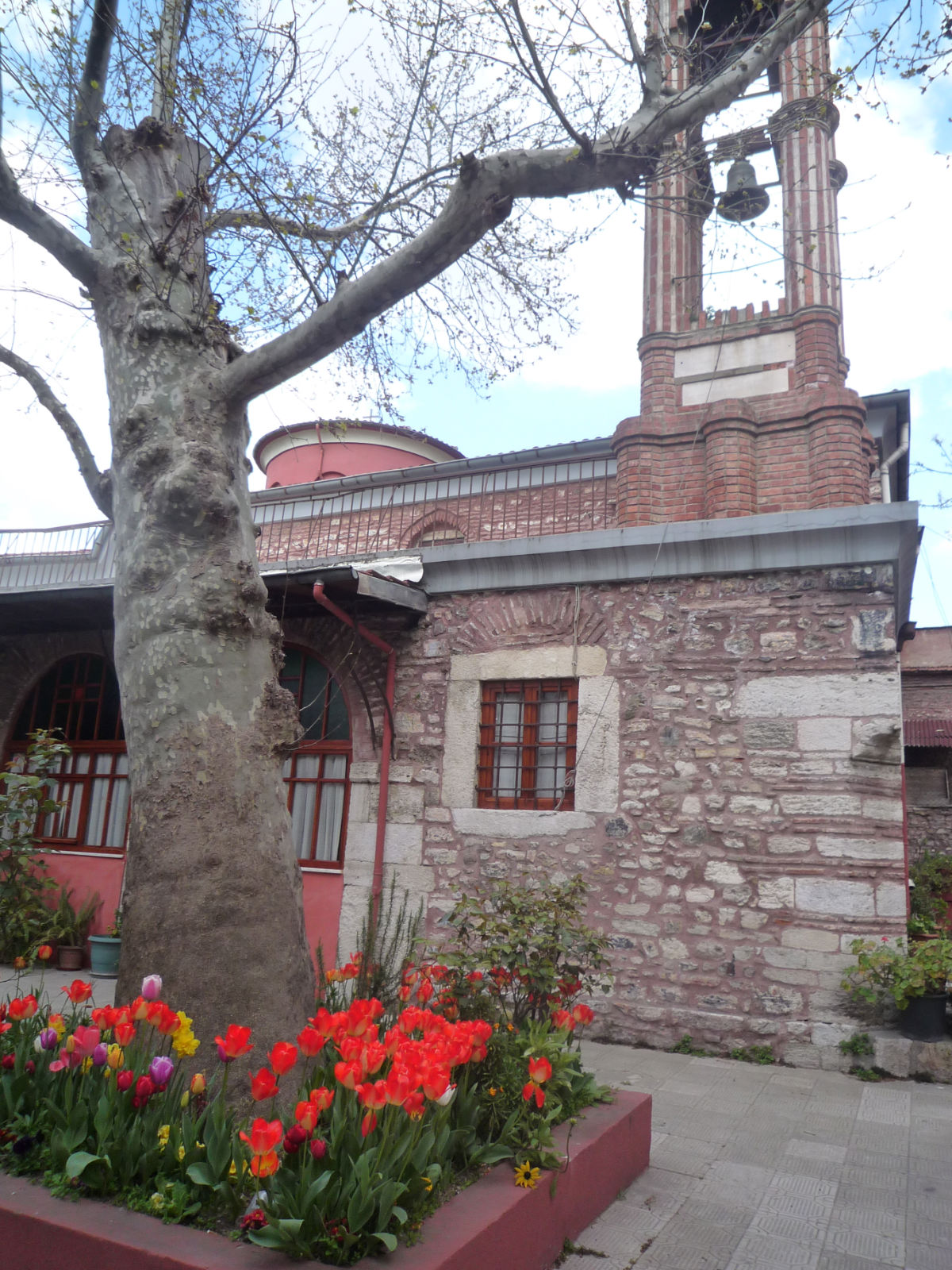
Church of Saint Mary of the Mongols

In the 14th and 15th centuries, with the flowering of the Renaissance cultural phenomenon in Italy, interest in ancient culture and the Greek language was awakened among Western European intellectuals. Many scholars in Constantinople (Barlaam of Calabria, Gemistos Plethon, and Manuel Chrysolorus) maintained close ties with prominent humanists in Italy, and many Italian humanists (Guarino da Verona, Francesco Filelfo, and others) came to the Byzantine capital to study the Greek language, ancient Greek literature, and philosophy. A large number of ancient Greek manuscripts and illustrations were exported from Byzantium to Italy (both by Italian collectors and monks, and by Greek scholars who rescued manuscripts from Ottoman pogroms).

During the Palaiologos dynasty, prominent theologians and philosophers such as Gregory Palamas, Theodore Metochitus, Barlaam of Calabria, Manuel Chrysolorus, Plethon and Mark of Ephesus worked in Constantinople, which experienced the so-called Palaeologan Renaissance, The historians George Akropolites and George Sphrantzes, the historian and astronomer Nicephorus Gregoras, the historian, philosopher and mathematician George Pachymeres the mathematician Maximus Planudes, the painter Theophanes the Greek, the poet Manuel Philes and the writer Joseph Bryennios. There was also a brief but lively flowering of the arts. With the emergence of new humanistic features in the culture, painting acquired greater realism (especially in the depiction of human emotions, which can be seen in the example of the mosaics of the church of the Chora monastery).

== Capture of Constantinople by the Ottomans ==
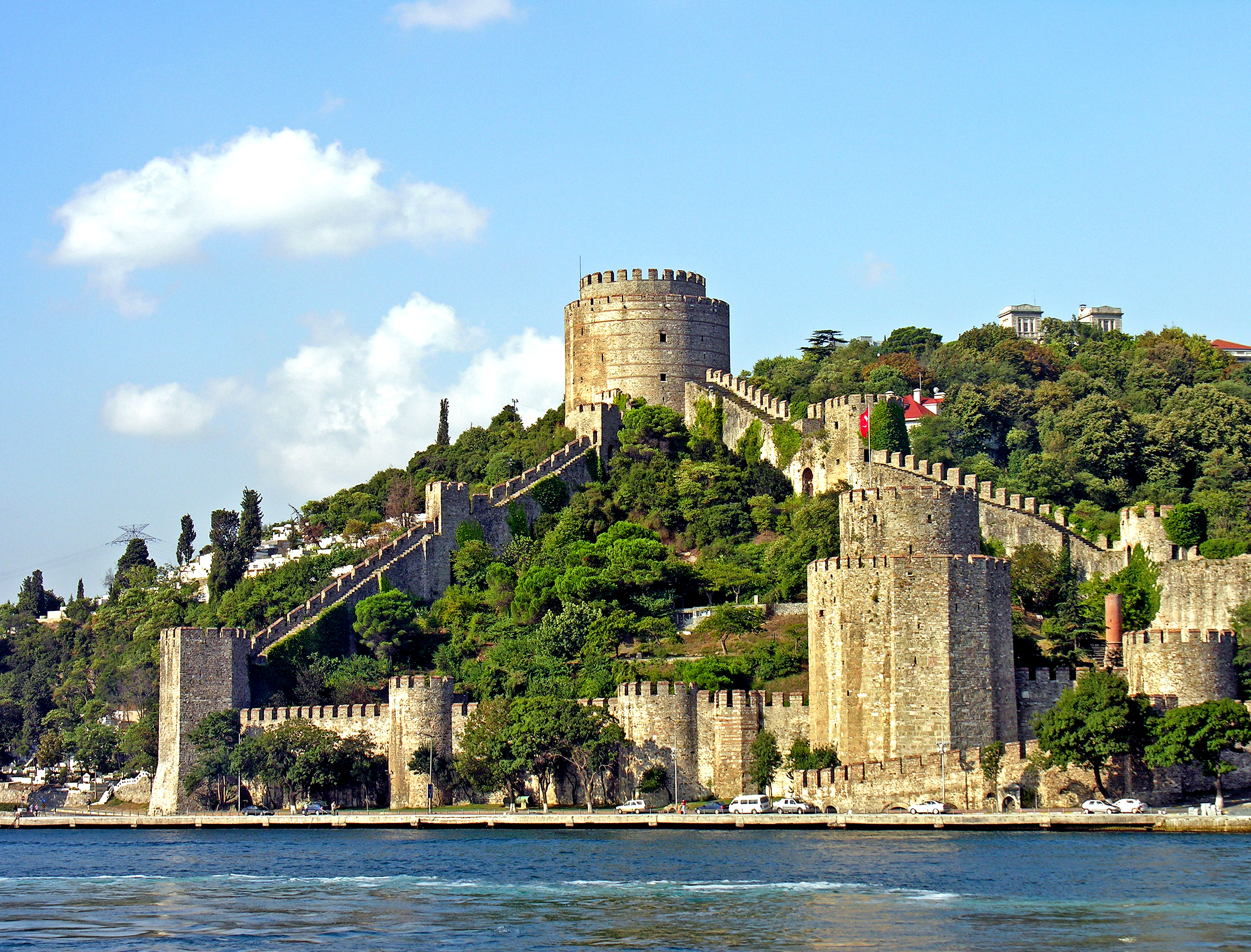
Rumelihisarı Fortress

Mehmed II's preparations for the conquest of Constantinople began with diplomatic steps, concluding peace treaties with western neighbors, then consolidating his power in Asia Minor by subduing the rebellious ruler of Karaman. Emperor Constantine XI Palaiologos, at the instigation of some of his court advisors, tried to pressure the Sultan through the Ottoman prince Orhan, who was in Constantinople as a nominal hostage, but this only encouraged Mehmed to accelerate preparations for the siege of the city. In March 1452, on the European side of the Bosphorus, in the narrowest part of the strait, the Turks began to build a mighty fortress —Rumelihisarı—, which, together with the old fortress opposite Anadoluhisara, effectively put the waterway under the full control of the Sultan. More than 6 thousand people worked here for four months and Mehmed personally supervised the work. The fortress was built in the shape of a triangle or an irregular pentagon and its high walls were crowned with four large and 13 small towers. The Turks dismantled all the surrounding churches, monasteries and abandoned Greek villages for building materials, as well as the old Byzantine prisons on the cape itself, formerly known as the Towers of Leta and Oblivion. The garrison of Rumelihisara under the command of Firuz-bey, armed with large caliber cannons, was a very impressive military force. After its completion, the Ottomans began a naval blockade of Constantinople, cutting off the supply of grain from the Black Sea region that was vital to the capital (not for nothing did the Turks call the fortress Bogazkezen — "Cutting the Straits" or "Cutting the Throat"). Mehmed ordered all ships passing through the Bosphorus to undergo a thorough customs inspection, and those who dared to evade inspection and payment of duty to be destroyed by fire from the fortress' guns (in November 1452, as an example to others, a large Venetian merchant ship was sunk and its crew executed for disobeying the inspection order).

Emperor Constantine, ready to make almost any concession, tried to make peace with Mehmed, but the Sultan had only one condition - to surrender the city to him in exchange for the emperor's possession of Morea. Constantine refused to surrender the Byzantine capital, saying that he would rather die on the battlefield. In midsummer, the inhabitants of the surrounding villages, which were constantly being ravaged by the Turks, were gathered in the city, after which Constantine ordered all the gates to be closed. In the autumn of 1452, the Turks occupied the last of the Byzantine cities — Mesemvria, Anchialos, Vize and Silivri. In October (according to other data - in November) 1452, arrived in Constantinople with a small detachment of archers papal legate Isidore, who signed in the Hagia Sophia Cathedral new agreement, which confirmed the Florentine Union. After Isidore served in the main Orthodox church of the city mass in the Catholic rite (December 12, 1452), passions even more heated. Constantinople was engulfed by mass riots, crowds of excited popular theologian Gennadius city dwellers and monks began to threaten to kill supporters of the Union and Catholics, and the Hagia Sophia was emptied as desecrated. (Note: It was then that one of the Turkophile leaders, the commander of the Byzantine fleet, Loukas Notaras, uttered the phrase that has become winged: "It is better to see a Turkish turban in the city than a Latin tiara".)

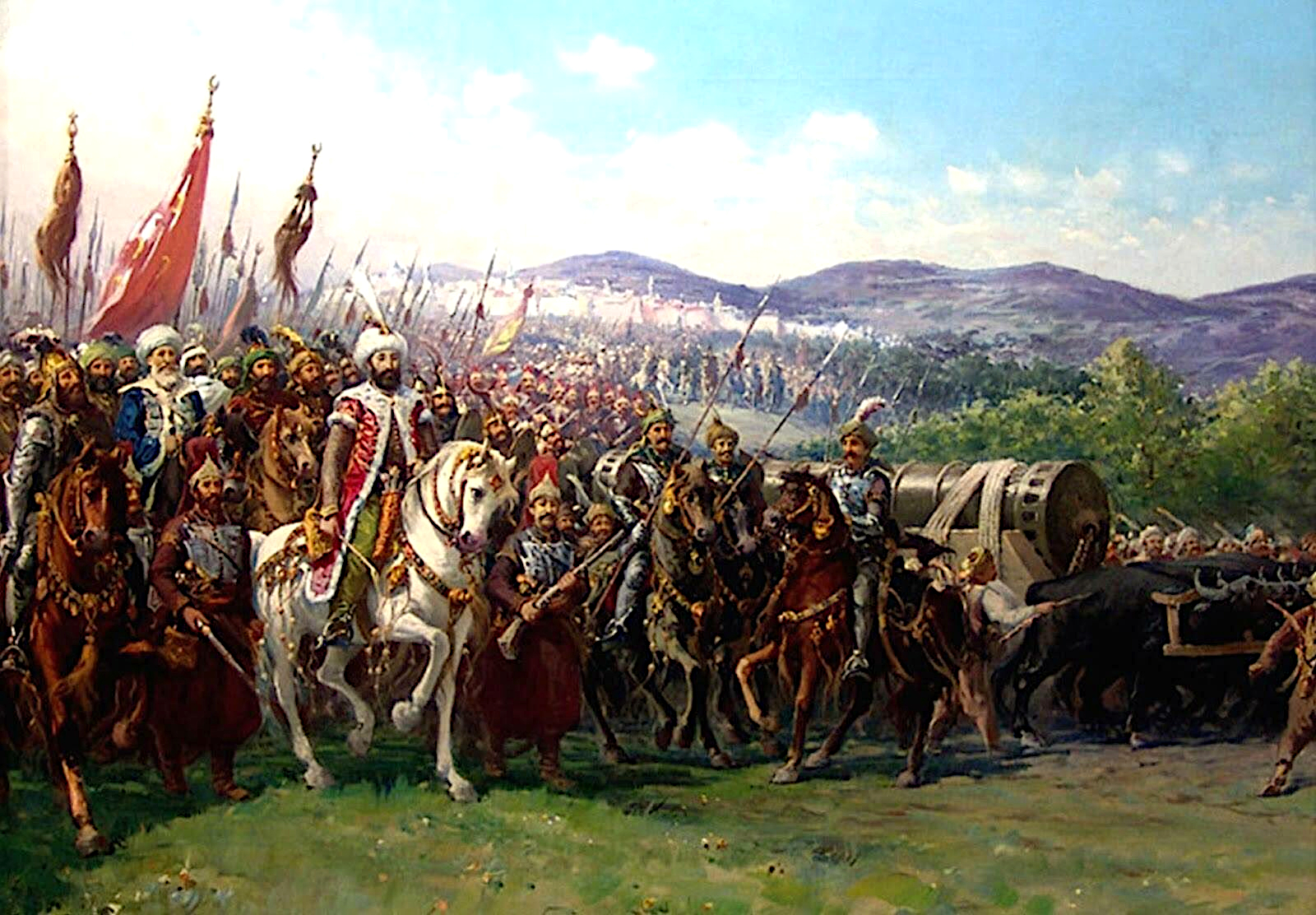
Mehmed II's expedition to Constantinople. Painting by Fausto Dzonaro, 1876

Meanwhile, throughout the winter, three Turkish cavalry regiments were encamped at the gates of the Genoese district of Pera, and in Adrianople the final preparations for the decisive campaign against Constantinople were being made. The Sultan personally studied the plans of the city and its fortifications, discussed the strategy of the campaign at length with his advisers, and paid special attention to equipping the army with powerful siege equipment and artillery. (Note: Under the supervision of the famous Hungarian craftsman Orban, dozens of powerful bronze cannons were cast, including the giant "Basilic", which fired huge stone cannonballs. Initially, Orban offered his services to the Byzantines, but due to lack of funds, he defected to the Ottomans.) Despite the religious enmity and the population's aversion to the Emperor-Uniate, Constantine XI managed, thanks to private donations, to prepare a small amount of food and weapons, to strengthen the towers and abandoned sections of the walls, to clear the moats. At the same time, many wealthy citizens tried to escape from Constantinople, escaping the Ottoman ships on Venetian and Cretan galleys. A census of the inhabitants capable of defending Constantinople with arms in their hands showed that there were no more than 5,000 of them. More than 2,000 soldiers numbered detachments of Genoese, Venetian, and Catalan mercenaries and volunteers, some of whom arrived on several ships shortly before the siege began (and some of them — at their own expense). (Note: According to other data, the city was defended by 6 thousand Greeks and about 3 thousand mercenaries from Italy, Spain, France, Germany, Rhodes and Chios.) Blockaded at the Golden Horn, the Byzantine fleet consisted of 25 ships. On March 23, 1453 the huge Turkish army under the command of Mehmed II has moved towards Constantinople (caravans with guns and heavy equipment, and also auxiliary detachments strengthening roads and bridges before them, have started marching towards Thrace even earlier - in February). Meanwhile, the Ottoman Navy, which had left Gelibolu, entered the Bosphorus and began to transfer parts of Asia Minor to the European coast. On April 1, all the inhabitants of Constantinople celebrated Easter for the last time, on April 2, all the gates were sealed and the chain was stretched over the Golden Horn, and on April 6, the famous siege of the Byzantine capital began.

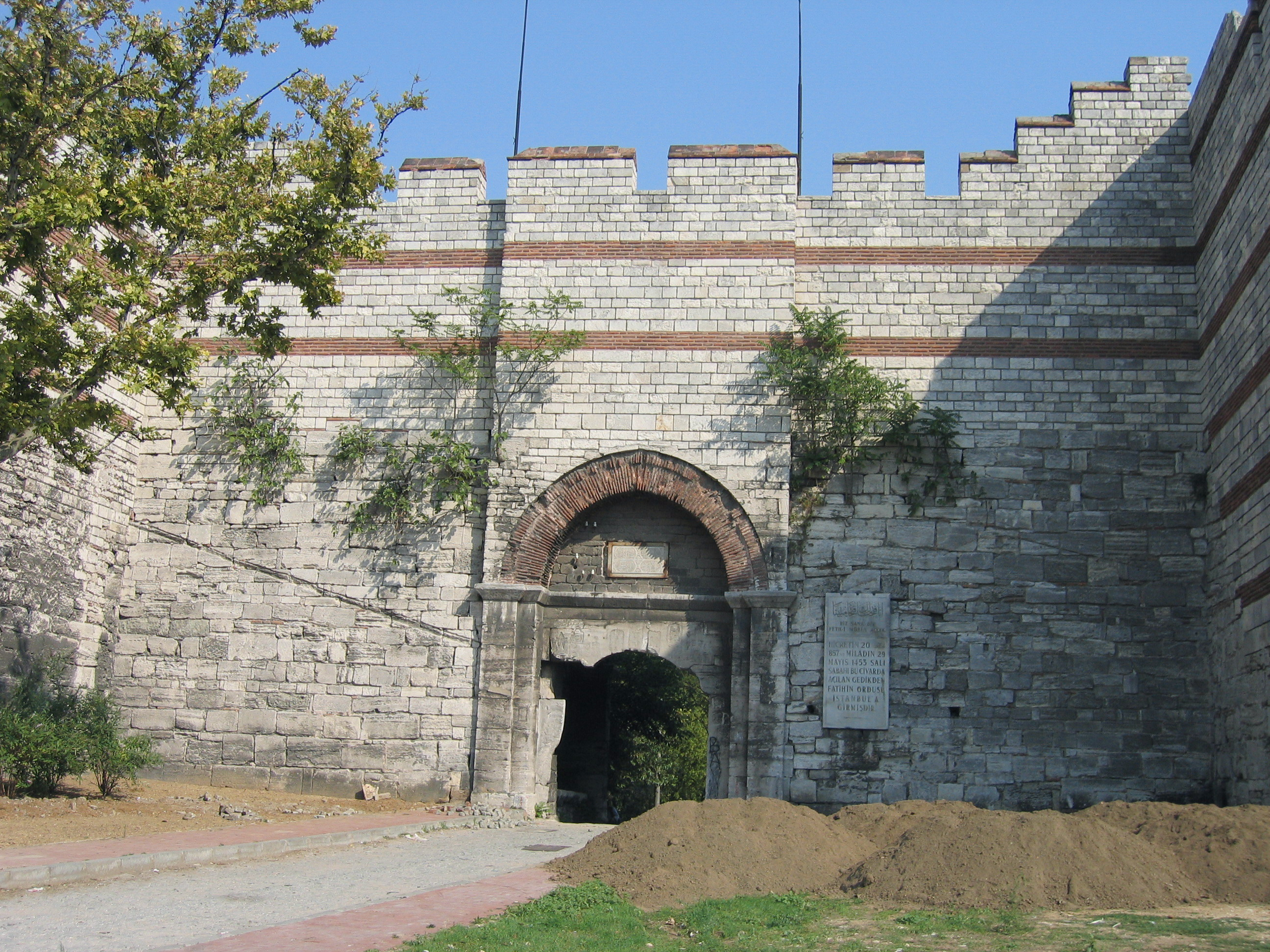
Charisian (Adrianople) Gate

Turkish troops surrounded the city along the entire line of its land walls — from the Golden Gate to Galata and Pera. The Sultan's headquarters was located behind the Sixth Hill, opposite the Adrianople Gate. Information about the size of Mehmed's army is very conflicting and varies greatly depending on the source. The Byzantine historian Doukas wrote about 400 thousand men, another historian and eyewitness of the siege, George Sphrantzes, mentioned about 250 thousand, modern Turkish historians estimate the number of the Ottoman army at 150 thousand men (including numerous rear and auxiliary units, servants, craftsmen and small merchants, Muslim priests and dervishes who were not directly involved in the fighting). In addition, the Sultan gathered for the siege about 80 military ships and more than 300 merchant ships (Note: According to other sources, the Ottoman fleet numbered 12-18 large war galleys (biremes and triremes), 70-80 smaller fusts, about 25 heavy transport parandaries and several brigantines; a total of 140 ships.) adapted for the transfer of troops and military cargoes. Mehmed's army had many Christian vassals, suppliers of arms and ammunition, craftsmen and advisors from European countries; Venetian spies were willingly hired to serve in the intelligence (during the siege even Christian services were held in the besiegers' camp).

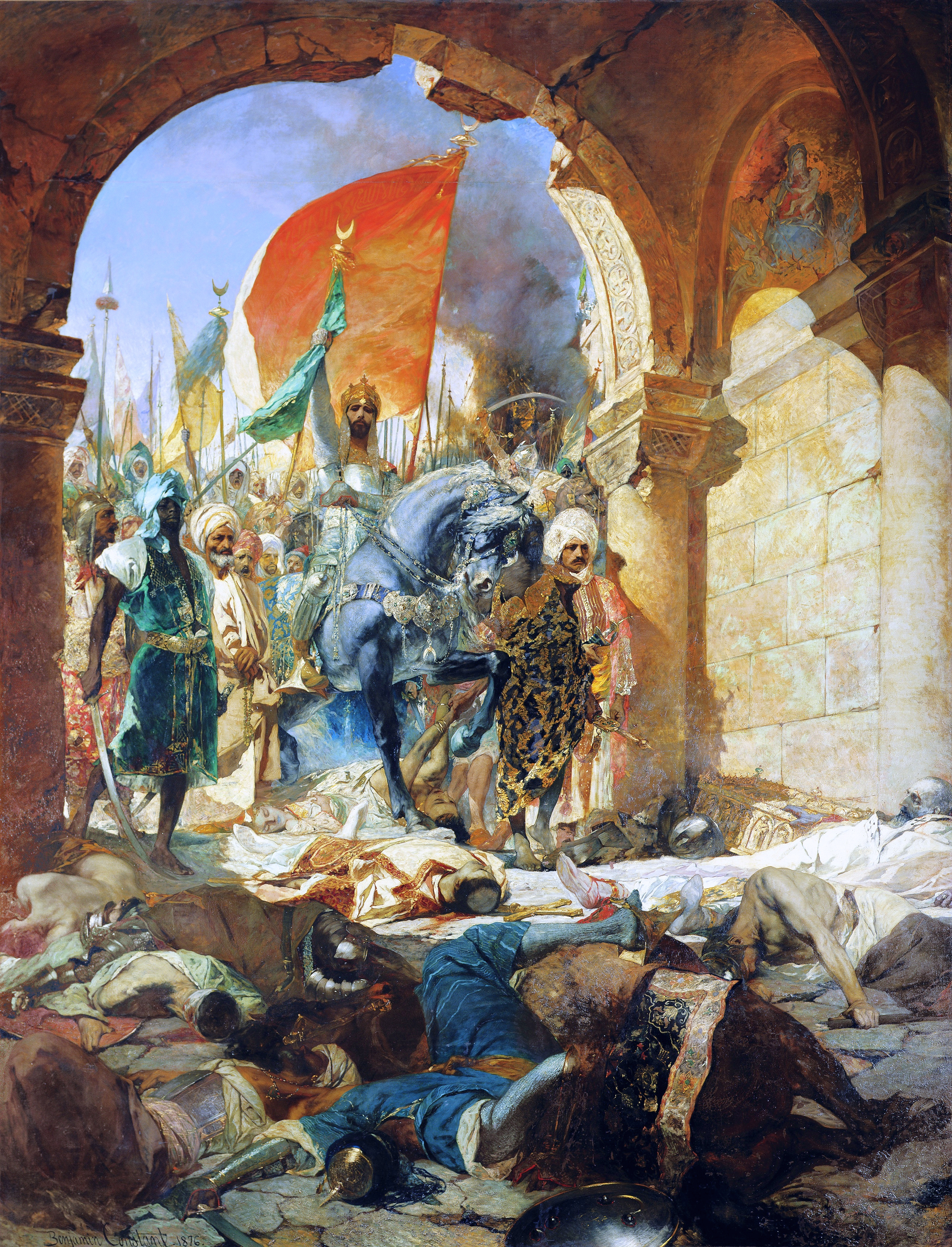
Mehmed II's entry into Constantinople. Painting by Jean-Joseph Benjamin-Constant, 1876,

Most of the newly created artillery, including Urban's giant cannon, as well as hundreds of trebuchets, were placed in front of St. Roman's Gate and a section of the Middle Walls (between the Sixth and Seventh Hills). The central group, consisting of selected units of janissaries, was commanded by Mehmed II himself. The right wing of the besiegers, which extended to the Golden Gate and was manned by units from Asia Minor, was commanded by the experienced commander Ishak Pasha (assisted by Mahmud Pasha). The left wing, which extended to the Golden Horn and was manned by regiments from the Ottoman Balkans, was commanded by Karadzha-bey. The rear of the Turkish army was covered by cavalry, and along the Golden Horn and on the hills of Pera, detachments of Zagan Pasha settled. At the confluence of the Bosphorus and the Golden Horn was the Turkish squadron under the command of Admiral Baltoglu, opposite to which, behind the Iron Chain, were lined up in a battle line the ships of the Byzantines and their European allies (up to forty merchant carracks and war galleys from Venice, Genoa, Ancona, Crete, Chios, Rhodes, Tana, Trabzon, Catalonia and Provence).

Due to the lack of manpower, the Byzantines left the walls along the coast of the Sea of Marmara practically unprotected, and the defense of the coast of the Golden Horn was entrusted to Loukas Notaras. The most capable forces of the defenders of Constantinople, consisting of imperial guards and Genoese detachments under the command of Giovanni Giustiniani, were placed in the center of the defense, at the gates of St. Roman and in the valley of the river Lycos (in fact, the Sultan's and the Emperor's posts were opposite each other). The remaining parts of the walls and the coast were covered by mixed detachments of Byzantines and mercenary Latins under the command of the Greeks Theodore of Karystos, Theophilus Paleologus, Demetrius Cantacuzin and Nicephorus Paleologus, the Genoese brothers Bocchiardi, the Venetians Minotto, Trevisano, Jacopo Contarini and Alvise Diedo, the Scotsman John (John the German), the Turk Orhan and Cardinal Isidore. On April 7, the first shots rattled the batteries of Turkish cannons, considered at that time the best in Europe. (Note: The Byzantine historian Kritovulus, describing these events, uttered a winged phrase: "Cannons decided everything".) At the same time, the Turks captured the fortresses of Tarabya and Stoudion, located outside the walls, and burned the fortress on the island of Büyükada, brutally executing the surviving soldiers. On April 18, Mehmed ordered an assault, concentrating the main forces on the most artillery-damaged parts of the wall and even attempting an undercut, but the Byzantines were able to repel the attack (including an attack by the Ottoman squadron on the allied fleet). On April 20, three Genoese ships loaded with weapons and food at the expense of Pope Nicholas V and a Byzantine ship carrying grain from Sicily defeated the Turkish squadron and broke through to the Golden Horn to the main forces of the besieged.

Mehmed then ordered about 70 of his light ships to be dragged through the hills of Pera to the Golden Horn, which greatly demoralized the defenders of Constantinople and had a great impact on the future course of hostilities. On April 28, several Italian ships attempted to attack the Turkish fleet at the Golden Horn, but were defeated. About 40 captured sailors were put on a stake in front of the city walls by order of Mehmed. In revenge, the Byzantines hanged several hundred Turkish prisoners on the bastions. In the camp of the besieged escalated disagreements between the Greeks and Latins, aggravated by the lack of food and the position of the Genoese Galata, who more than once openly helped the Sultan. In addition, the traditional rivals, the Genoese and the Venetians, often clashed with each other, and the Orthodox clergy was irritated by the Uniate emperor, who confiscated church property for defense needs. Continuous bombardment of the walls with cannons and catapults alternated with attempts to fill in the moat, raise the siege towers, set fire to the gates and dig tunnels under the walls, as well as massive land and sea attacks, which the dwindling and weakened forces of the city's defenders found increasingly difficult to repel. Mehmed decided to strike the main blow of the decisive attack on the most damaged section of the fortress walls — between St. Roman's Gate and Harisiye Gate, where the fortifications were located below the positions of the Turkish batteries due to the terrain, and the moat was not so deep.

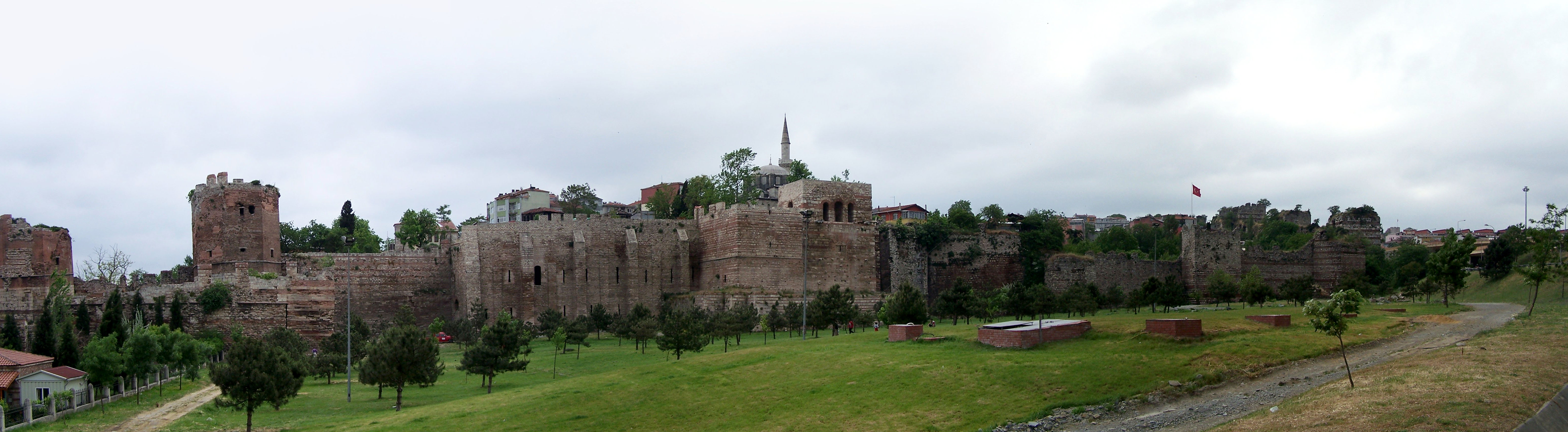
The wall of the medieval city of Constantinople in the area of the Harisi Gate (Adrianople) with traces of Ottoman bombardment.

By the time of the siege, only one in two of the city's defenders who had stood on the walls and sailed on the ships at the beginning of the siege had survived. In some places, there were only two or three men defending a tower or a bastion between towers. In the central part of the defense, in the area of the Mesothechion, three thousand soldiers were concentrated — Byzantine guards, Genoese mercenaries and Venetian sailors. After midnight on May 29, 1453, wave after wave of Turkish troops went on the attack. Cannons destroyed the remains of the walls in the area of St. Roman's Gate, and the escape of the seriously wounded Genoese commander Giustiniani caused confusion in the ranks of the defenders. In the battle at St. Roman's Gate, the last Byzantine Emperor Constantine died (soon, by order of the Sultan, his severed head was exhibited on the high column Justiniana in the center of the city). The Turks poured into Constantinople, killing all the surviving soldiers and those who had no value as slaves (the old, the sick, the crippled, the feeble-minded and infants). About 20 Byzantine and Italian ships (according to other data - only seven Genoese and Venetian ships) managed to escape from the Golden Horn, taking advantage of the fact that the sailors of the Turkish squadron also rushed to plunder the city. The Cretans, who bravely defended several towers, so impressed Mehmed that he allowed them to cease their resistance and sail freely out of the city with their three ships. The sacking of Constantinople lasted three days, and some of the buildings were badly damaged by fire. (Note: In their search for hidden treasures, the invaders destroyed marble walls and columns and tore down mosaics. The Turks simply burned manuscripts and icons that were of no value to them, taking only church utensils made of precious metals. However, according to the estimates of some historians, the Ottomans did not get even half of the booty that went to the Latins in 1204.) The surviving inhabitants of the conquered capital, including those who took refuge in the cathedral of Hagia Sophia (mostly women, children, old men and monks), were sold by the Turks into slavery at slave markets. (Note: According to some estimates, the Turks took about 60,000 people from Constantinople into captivity. According to other sources, this number is greatly exaggerated, as the total population of the city at the time of the capture was about 50,000 people.)

== Bibliography ==
- Дубнов, С. М. (2003). Краткая история евреев (in Russian). Ростов н/Д.: Феникс. p. 576.
- Косминский, Е. А. (1952). История Средних веков (in Russian). М.: Политиздат. p. 748.
- Кроули, Р. (2008). Константинополь: Последняя осада. 1453 (in Russian). М.: АСТ Москва. p. 346. ISBN 978-5-9713-9418-1.
- Лэнг, Д. (2004). Армяне. Народ-созидатель (in Russian). М.: Центрполиграф. p. 350.
- Мантран, Р. (2006). Повседневная жизнь Стамбула в эпоху Сулеймана Великолепного. Живая история. Повседневная жизнь человечества (in Russian). М.: Молодая гвардия. p. 367.
- Машкин, Н. А. (1950). История Древнего Рима (in Russian). М.: Политиздат. p. 736.
- Петросян Ю. А., Юсупов А. Р. (1977). Город на двух континентах (in Russian). М.: Наука. p. 288.
- Успенский, Ф. И. (2011). История Византийской империи. Становление (in Russian). М.: Астрель. p. 608. ISBN 978-5-17-072052-1.
- Чекалова, А. А. (1986). Константинополь в VI веке. Восстание Ника (in Russian). М.: Наука. p. 174.
- Эссад, Д. (1919). Константинополь от Византии до Стамбула (in Russian). М.: Изд. М. и С. Сабашниковых. p. 336.
- Большая российская энциклопедия. М.: БРЭ, 2010. V. 15. 767 p. ISBN 978-5-85270-346-0.
- Miller T. S. The Birth of the Hospital in the Byzantine Empire. Baltimore: Johns Hopkins University Press, 1997. 328 p. ISBN 0-8018-2676-4.
- Necipoğlu Nevra. Byzantine Constantinople: Monuments, Topography and Everyday Life. Leiden: BRILL, 2001. 363 p. ISBN 978-90-04-11625-2.
- Zeynep Çelik. The Remaking of Istanbul: Portrait of an Ottoman City in the Nineteenth Century. — Berkley: University of California Press, 1986. 183 p. ISBN 978-0-520-08239-7.
