= Arian creeds =

Creeds of Arian Christians

Arian creeds are the creeds of Arian Christians, developed mostly in the fourth century when Arianism was one of the main varieties of Christianity.

A creed is a brief summary of the beliefs formulated by a group of religious practitioners, expressed in a more or less standardized format. Arian creeds are a subset of Christian Creeds.

== Overview ==
=== Christian creeds ===
Christian creeds originate in the genres of the trinitarian formula and the Christological confession. In the mid-2nd century a type of doctrinal formula called the Rule of Faith emerged. These were seen as demonstrating the correctness of one's beliefs and helping to avoid heretical doctrines. In the third century, more elaborate professions of faith developed combining the influence of baptismal creeds (i.e., trinitarian formulae) and rules of faith. Learning the creeds was part of the process of gaining admission to the Christian religion. Interrogatory creeds were varieties of creeds used to test candidates for baptism, while declaratory creeds allowed the candidate to express their beliefs in the first person. Among the oldest known Christian Creeds are the Roman Creed and the Nicene Creed.

=== Arian controversy ===
Most Arian creeds were written in the fourth century after 325 and during the Arian controversy, a time when the church adopted replacements for the Nicene Creed; in particular, for the word homoousios, as contained in the creed. The Arian controversy began with a dispute between bishop Alexander of Alexandria and a local presbyter, Arius, in the late 310s and early 320s. It lasted until Emperor Theodosius issued the Edict of Thessalonica in the year 380, in which he instructed all Roman citizens to "believe in the one deity of the Father, the Son and the Holy Spirit, in equal majesty and in a holy Trinity." The edict continued to describe Christians who do not accept this teaching as "foolish madmen" and as "heretics." And, "they will suffer in the first place the chastisement of the divine condemnation and in the second the punishment of our authority which in accordance with the will of Heaven we shall decide to inflict." This was followed by proclamation of the Creed of Constantinople in 381.

=== Controversy after Nicaea ===
The Council of Nicaea expressed its opposition to Arius' beliefs in the Nicene Creed. During the 55 years after Nicaea, there was a strong reaction in the church to the Nicene Creed; particularly to the word Greek homoousios ("same substance"). Consequently the church, during that period, formulated various creeds which offered alternatives to the word homoousios and which are regarded today as Arian creeds. Advocates of Nicene Christianity and Arian Christianity debated and competed throughout the fourth century, each claiming to be the orthodox variant. Nicene Christians called their opponents, as a group, Arians. However, many opponents of the Nicene Creed differed significantly from the teachings of Arius, and did not identify with Arius.

After Nicaea in 325, the Emperor Constantine gave orders that all of Arius' books be destroyed and that all people who hide Arius' writings, be killed. Therefore, very little of Arius' writings remains today. A brief statement of what Arius believed was preserved in a letter he wrote to the Arian archbishop of Constantinople; Eusebius of Nicomedia (died 341).

The church produced many more creeds after the Homoian group came to dominance in the church in the 350s. These include the Second Sirmian Creed (357), the Creed of Nike (360), the Creed of Acacius (359), the Rule of Faith and the Creed of Ulfilas (383), Eudoxius' Rule of Faith, the Creed of Auxentius (364), and the Creed of Germinius.

== Eusebian Creeds ==
In 2004, Lewis Ayres wrote:

"A vast amount of scholarship over the past thirty years has offered revisionist accounts of themes and figures from the fourth century."

As discussed in the Arius page, scholars today agree that Arius was not the founder of 'Arianism' and that the anti-Nicenes were not followers of Arius and, therefore, are mistakenly called Arians. For example:

Richard Hanson (1981) wrote: "The expression 'the Arian Controversy' is a serious misnomer."

Rowan Williams (1987) wrote: "'Arianism' as a coherent system, founded by a single great figure and sustained by his disciples, is a fantasy … based on the polemic of Nicene writers, above all Athanasius."

Lewis Ayres (2004) wrote: "This controversy is mistakenly called Arian."

For this reason, Ayres refers to the non-Nicenes of the fourth century not as 'Arians' but as 'Eusebians'. For example:

"My second theological trajectory is the one in which we locate Arius himself. This loose alliance I will term 'Eusebian'. When I use this term I mean to designate any who would have found common ground with either of Arius' most prominent supporters, Eusebius of Nicomedia or Eusebius of Caesarea."

The creeds on this page, therefore, should rather be called 'Eusebian' because their theology is significantly different from Arius'.

== The Profession of Faith of Arius ==
=== Arius' Writings ===
Arius was a presbyter of Alexandria in the early fourth century. Very little of Arius' writings survived until today:

"As far as his own writings go, we have no more than three letters, (and) a few fragments of another."

"The Thalia is Arius' only known theological work," but "we do not possess a single complete and continuous text." We only have extracts from it in the writings of Arius' enemies, "mostly from the pen of Athanasius of Alexandria, his bitterest and most prejudiced enemy."

=== Arius' Theology ===
Arius entered into conflict with his bishop, Alexander:

"Alexander taught that God was always Father and that the Son was always Son, thus implying the eternal generation of the Son; as the Father's Word and Wisdom the Son must always have been with the Father. At the same time, he taught that the Son is the exact image of the Father."" "Arius saw his bishop's theology as implying two ultimate principles in the universe, and he thought that Alexander compromised the biblical insistence on the Father's being alone God and alone immortal (1 Tim. 6:16). For Arius, any talk about Father and Son as coeternal ignored the hierarchy involved in the very language of Father and Son."

Alexander excommunicated Arius in about 318. In a letter to his friend Eusebius of Nicomedia, Arius stated that he was being excommunicated for teaching that "the Son has an origin, but God is unoriginated ... and also that the Son derives from non-existence." Arius stated that he taught these things because the Son was not a part (μέρος) of the Father, nor an emanation or exhalation of the substance of the Father. For his part, Alexander stated that Arius' beliefs were as follows:

There was a time when God was not Father, and the Son was created out of nothing. The Son is a created product and is not like in substance to the Father. He has come into existence whereas the Father has no origin. The Son is mutable and alterable while the Father is not. The Father is invisible to the Son. The Father created the Son in order to create humans. The father and the son are not consubstantial. Arius also argued that the word homoousios (consubstantial, or having the same substance) should not be used to describe the relation between God the Father and God the Son: Father and Son are not consubstantial according to Arius.

=== Arius' Support ===
Initially, Arius gained a great deal of support from other bishops in the Eastern Roman Empire. "Over the next few years Arius gained support from some bishops in Palestine, Syria, and North Africa, especially Eusebius of Caesarea in Palestine and Eusebius of Nicomedia, near Constantinople. … Although these supporters may have been wary of some aspects of Arius' theology … they joined in opposition to Alexander. For all of them Alexander's theology seemed to compromise the unity of God and the unique status of the Father."

For example, Eusebius of Caesarea was "universally acknowledged to be the most scholarly bishop of his day." He "was certainly an early supporter of Arius" and he "thought the theology of Alexander a greater menace than that of Arius."

"Holger Strutwolf (1999) … concludes that Eusebius initially misunderstood Arius as saying something similar to himself, and then distanced himself more and more from the Alexandrian as he realized his error, while still opposing the theology … advanced by Alexander."

=== Letter to Alexander ===
In about the year 320, Arius and his supporters wrote a letter to Alexander of Alexandria setting out their beliefs in the hope of getting Arius' excommunication rescinded. The letter contained a profession of faith, the earliest known Arian creed.

Profession of Faith of Arius	Hanson paraphrase and translation
Μακαρίῳ πάπᾳ καὶ ἐπισκόπῳ ἡμῶν Ἀλεξάνδρῳ οἱ πρεσβύτεροι καὶ ὁι διάκονοι ἐν κυρίῳ χαίρειν. Ἡ πίστις ἡμῶν ἡ ἐκ προγόνων, ἣν καὶ ἀπὸ σοῦ μεμαθήκαμεν, μακάριε πάπα, ἔστιν αὔτη· οἴδαμεν ἕνα θεόν, μόνον ἀγέννητον, μόνον ἀίδιον, μόνον ἄναρχον, μόνον ἀληθινόν, μόνον ἀθανασίαν ἔχοντα, μόνον σοφόν, μόνον ἀγαθόν, μόνον δυναάστην, πάντων κριτήν, διοικητήν, οἰκονόμον, ἄτρεπτον, καὶ ἀναλλοίωτον, δίκαιον καὶ ἀγαθόν, νόμου καὶ προφητῶν	They have set out their beliefs on the points under dispute: They profess the uniqueness of the Father, with much use of the word 'sole' (monos), including 'sole true, sole wise, sole good', and then,
καὶ καινῆς διαθήκης τοῦτον θεὸν γεννήσαντα υἱὸν μονογενῆ πρὸ χρόνων αἰωνίων, »δι' οὗ καὶ τοὺς αἰῶνας καὶ τὰ ὅλα πεποίηκε«, γεννήσαντα δὲ οὐ δοκήσει, ἀλλὰ ἀληθείᾳ· ὑποστήσαντα ἰδίῳ θελήματι ἄτρεπτον καὶ ἀναλλοίωτον κτίσμα τοῦ θεοῦ τέλειον, ἀλλ' οὐχ ὡς ἓν τῶν κτισμάτων· γέννημα, ἀλλ' οὐχ ὡς ἓν τῶν γεγεννημένων,	He who has begotten the only-begotten Son before aeonian times (χρόνων αἰωνίων), through whom also he made the aeons and everything, who produced him not in appearance but in truth, giving him existence (ὑποστήσαντα) by his own will, unchangeable and unalterable (ἄτρεπτόν τε καὶ ἀναλλοίωτον), a perfect creature (κτίσμα) of God, but not like one of the creatures, a product (γέννημα), but not like one of the things produced (γεγεννημένων),
οῦδ' ὡς Οὐαλεντῖνος προβολὴν τὸ γέννημα τοῦ πατρὸς ἐδογμάτισεν, οὐδ' ὡς Μανιχαῖος μέρος ὁμοούσιον τοῦ πατρὸς τὸ γέννημα εἰσηγήσατο, οὐδ' ὡς Σαβέλλιος τὴν μονάδα διαιρῶν υἰοπάτορα εἶπεν, οὐδ' ὡς Ἱέρακας λύχνον ἀπὸ λύχνου ἢ ὡς λαμπάδα εἰς δύο, οὐδὲ τὸν ὄντα πρότερον ὕστερον γεννηθέντα ἢ ἐπικτισθέντα εἰς υἱόν,	the product of the Father not as Valentinus laid down an issue (προβολήν), nor as Mani taught a consubstantial part (μέρος ὁμοούσιον) of the Father, nor as Sabellius said, dividing the Monad, a 'Sonfather' (υἱοπατόρα), nor, as Hieracas, a light lit from a light or as a lamp (spread) into two, nor as one who existed before but was later made into a Son by begetting or creation...
ὡς καὶ σὺ αὐτός, μακάριε πάπα, κατὰ μέσην τὴν ἐκκλησίαν καὶ ἐν συνεδρίῳ πλειστάκις τοὺς ταῦτα εισηγησαμένους ἀπηγόρευσας,	
ἀλλ' ὥς φαμεν θελήματι τοῦ θεοῦ πρὸ χρόνων καὶ πρὸ αἰώνων κτισθέντα καὶ τὸ ζῆν καὶ τὸ εἶναι παρὰ τοῦ πατρὸς εἰληφότα καὶ τὰς δόξας, συνυποστήσαντος αὐτῷ τοῦ πατρός. οὐ γὰρ ὁ πατὴρ δοὺς αὐτῷ πάντων τὴν κληρονομίαν ἐστέρησεν ἑαυτὸν ὧν ἀγεννήτως ἔχει ἐν ἑαυτῷ· πηγὴ γάρ ἐστι πάντων. ὥστε τρεῖς εἰσιν ὑποστάσεις.	but, as we hold, created by the will of God before times and before aeons and having received life and being from the Father and various kinds of glory, since he gave him existence, alongside himself. For when the Father gave him the inheritance of everything he did not deprive himself of that which he possesses unoriginatedly (ἀγεννήτως) in himself; for he is the source of all. Consequently, there are three existing realities (ὑποστάσεις).
καὶ ὁ μὲν θεὸς αἴτιος τῶν πάντων τυγχάνων ἔστιν ἄναρχος μονώτατος, ὁ δὲ υἱὸς ἀχρόνως γεννηθεὶς ὑπὸ τοῦ πατρὸς καὶ πρὸ αἰώνων κτισθεὶς καὶ θεμελιωθεὶς οὐκ ἦν πρὸ τοῦ γεννηθῆναι, ἀλλὰ ἀχρόνως πρὸ πάντων γεννηθεὶς μόνος ὑπὸ τοῦ πατρὸς ὑπέστη. οὐδὲ γάρ ἐστιν ἀίδιος ἢ συναίδιος ἢ συναγέννητος τῷ πατρί, οὐδὲ ἅμα τῷ πατρὶ τὸ εἶναι ἔχει, ὥς τινες λέγουσι τὰ πρός τι δύο ἀγεννήτους ἀρχὰς εἰσηγούμενοι, ἀλλ' ὡς μονὰς καὶ ἀρχὴ πάντων, οὕτως ὁ θεὸς πρὸ πάντων ἐστί.	And God is the cause of them all for he is supremely sole (μονώτατος) without beginning (ἄναρχος), and the Son, having been begotten timelessly by the Father and created and established before aeons, did not exist before he was begotten, but, begotten timelessly before everything, alone has been given existence by the Father; for he is not external nor co-external nor co-unoriginated, with the Father, nor does he possess being parallel with (ἅμα) the Father, as some say who rely on the argument from relations thereby introducing two unoriginated ultimate principles, but as the Monad (μονάς) and origin (ἀρχή) of everything, so God is prior to everything.
διὸ καὶ πρὸ τοῦ υἱοῦ ἔστιν, ὡς καὶ παρὰ σοῦ μεμαθήκαμεν κατὰ μέσην τὴν ἐκκλησίαν κηρύξαντος.	Therefore, he is also prior to the Son, as we have learnt from you (i.e. Alexander) when you were preaching in the midst of the church.
καθὸ οὖν παρὰ τοῦ θεοῦ τὸ εἶναι ἔχει καὶ τὰς δόξας καὶ τὸ ζῆν καὶ τὰ πάντα αὐτῷ παρεδόθη, κατὰ τοῦτο ἀρχὴ αὐτοῦ ἐστιν ὁ θεός. ἄρχει γὰρ αὐτοῦ ὡς θεὸς αὐτοῦ καὶ πρὸ αὐτοῦ ὤν. εἰ δὲ τὸ »ἐξ αὐτοῦ« καὶ τὸ »ἐκ γαστρὸς« καὶ τὸ »ἐκ τοῦ πατρὸς ἐξῆλθον καὶ ἥκω« ὡς μέρος αὐτοῦ ὁμοουσίου καὶ ὡς προβολὴ ὑπό τινων νοεῖται, σύνθετος ἔσται ὁ πατὴρ καὶ διαιρετὸς καὶ τρεπτὸς καὶ σῶμα κατ' αὐτοὺς καὶ τὸ ὅσον ἐπ' αὐτοῖς τὰ ἀκόλουθα σώματι πάσχων ὁ ασώματος θεός.	The Father, Arius continues, is the Son's origin (ἀρχή) from which he derives his glories and life everlasting, and the Father is the Son's God. Arius dislikes any statement that the Son is 'from' (ἐκ) the Father, because it implies that the Son is 'a consubstantial part of him and like an issue', and this means that God is composite and divisible and mutable and even corporeal.

=== Council of Nicaea ===
In an attempt to resolve the doctrinal controversy between the followers of Arius and of Alexander, Emperor Constantine called the Council of Nicaea in 325. "Constantine himself summoned the bishops."

"Constantine … seems to have promoted Christianity as a unifying religion for the empire (although his personal beliefs will almost certainly remain unclear). Unity of Christians as a body was of as much concern to Constantine as any doctrinal issue involved."

The council of Nicaea produced the Nicene Creed, which backed the doctrines of Alexander against those of Arius.

At that council, "tension among Eusebian bishops was caused by knowledge that Constantine had taken Alexander's part and by events at the council of Antioch only a few months before."

=== Homoousios ===
Where Arius had declared that the Father and Son should not be considered consubstantial (homoousios), the Nicene Creed specifically declared the Father and Son to be consubstantial by declaring that the Son was of the substance of the Father (ἐκ τῆς οὐσίας τῆς πατρός).

"The choice of the term homoousios seems to have been motivated in large part because Arius was known to reject it." The meeting knew that the emperor would exile all who refused to sign the Creed and "desired to secure the condemnation of Arius."

=== Controversy after Nicaea ===
The Arian controversy persisted for the next sixty years. However, "Arius himself is of little significance in the years that follow" after Nicaea. The Controversy now centered around the "new terms borrowed from the pagan philosophy of the day," namely, the terms substance (ousia) and 'same substance' (homoousios) to describe the relation between Father and Son in Christian theology but extending to many related aspects of Christian theology such as the Incarnation and the Holy Spirit.

== The Dedication Creed - 341 ==
In the year 341, approximately 90 bishops of the Eastern Church met in a Council of Antioch, formally presided over by bishop Flacillus of Antioch. Other leaders of this council included Eusebius of Nicomedia, now bishop of Constantinople, and Acacius of Caesarea, who become bishop of Caesarea in 340.

The Council produced four documents. The second is the most important and is known as the Dedication Creed because the Council met at the celebration of the dedication of a new church built by Constantius II.

=== Purpose of the Council ===
The Council met to discuss the decisions of the Council of Rome of the previous year (340), and the letter written to the Eusebians by Julius, Bishop of Rome, earlier in 341, after that council. That Council of Rome had vindicated Athanasius and Marcellus. Both of them were previously condemned at councils of the Eastern Church; Athanasius in 335 for violence against the Melitians in his see and Marcellus some time earlier for Sabellianism. Their vindication, therefore, caused significant tension between the East and West. That tension was heightened by the letter that Julius, the bishop of Rome, after that council wrote to the Eastern Church. In that letter, he accused the East of Arianism, meaning, being followers of Arius’ already discredited theology.

=== An Eastern Council, like Nicaea ===
Both the Dedication Council and the Nicene Council of 325 were essentially councils of the Eastern Church. The Dedication Council consisted exclusively of bishops from the Eastern part of the Empire and represented the view of the ordinary educated Eastern bishop. Similarly, the vast majority of the bishops attending Nicaea were from the East:

“Very few Western bishops took the trouble to attend the Council (of Nicaea). The Eastern Church was always the pioneer and leader in theological movements in the early Church. ... The Westerners at the Council represented a tiny minority.”

==== The Dedication Creed ====
The Dedication Creed is anti-Sabellian because the main threat was the Sabellian one-hypostasis tendency of the Western Church, which can be illustrated in a number of ways:

- Firstly, the Council of Rome vindicated Marcellus, a well-known Sabellian. “That Julius and later the Westerners at Sardica should have declared him (Marcellus) orthodox was bound to appear to the Eastern theologians to be a condoning of Sabellianism.” (Hanson Lecture)
- Secondly, the Council of Rome also vindicated Athanasius, who also maintained a one-hypostasis theology. In his theology, the Son is “in” the Father as the Father's only Wisdom and Word. Athanasius, therefore, taught that Father, Son, and Spirit are one single hypostasis (Person).
- Thirdly, at the failed Council of Serdica in 343, the Western delegates explicitly formulated a one-hypostasis manifeston

=== Other Teachings ===
==== The Son is subordinate to the Father. ====
The Dedication Creed asserts that the Son is subordinate to the Father. But subordination was to be expected because subordination was orthodoxy at the time. “Indeed, until Athanasius began writing, every single theologian, East and West, had postulated some form of Subordinationism.” In other words, the subordination in the Creed is not a concession to Arius' theology.

==== He is the image of the Father's substance. ====
The Creed says that “the Son is 'the exact Image of the Godhead, the ousia and the will and the power and the glory of the Father'.” In contrast to the Nicene Creed, which says that the Son is of the same ousia as the Father (homoousios), the phrase “exact image of the … ousia … of the Father” means that the Son is distinct from the substance of the Father. Later in the fourth century, in the mid-50s, after Athanasius had re-introduced the term homoousios into the Controversy, "image of the Father's substance" became the catchphrase of the Homoiousians (meaning 'similar substance').

==== The Son is God. ====
The Creed regards the Son as subordinate to the Father but also refers to the Son as “God” (theos) and as “God from God.” The reason is that the term theos is not equivalent to the modern word "God." While we use the te

=== Text of the Dedication Creed ===
Four creeds were produced at this council; the Dedication Creed itself is the Second Creed of Antioch.

Dedication Creed (Athanasius version)	English translation
Πιστεύομεν ἀκολούθως τῇ εὐαγγελικῇ καὶ ἀποστολικῇ παραδόσει εἰς ἕνα θεὸν πατέρα παντοκράτορα, τὸν τῶν ὅλων δημιουργόν τε καὶ ποιητὴν καὶ προνοητήν, ἐξ οὗ τὰ πάντα·	Following the evangelical and apostolic tradition, we believe in one God Father Almighty, artificer and maker and designer (προνοητήν) of the universe:
καὶ εἰς ἕνα κύριον Ἰησοῦν Χριστόν, τὸν υἱὸν αὐτοῦ, τὸν μονογενῆ θεόν, δι' οὗ τὰ πάντα, τὸν γεννηθέντα πρὸ τῶν αἰώνων ἐκ τοῦ πατρός, θεὸν ἐκ θεοῦ, ὅλον ἐξ ὅλου, μόνον ἐκ μόνου, τέλειον ἐκ τελείου, βασιλέα ἐκ βασιλέως, κύριον ἀπὸ κυρίου, λόγον ζῶντα, σοφίαν ζῶσαν, φῶς ἀληθινόν, ὁδόν, ἀλήθειαν, ἀνάστασιν, ποιμένα, θύραν, ἄτρεπτόν τε καὶ ἀναλλοίωτον, τῆς θεότητος οὐσίας τε καὶ βουλῆς καἰ δυνάμεως καὶ δόξης τοῦ πατρὸς ἀπαράλλακτον εἰκόνα, τὸν πρωτότοκον πάσης κτίσεως, τὸν ὄντα ἐν ἀρχῇ πρὸς τὸν θεόν, λόγον θεὸν κατὰ τὸ εἰρημένον ἐν τῷ εὐαγγελίῳ· »καὶ θεὸς ἧν ὁ λόγος«, δι' οὖ τὰ πάντα ἐγένετο, καὶ ἐν ᾧ τὰ πάντα συνέστηκε, τὸν ἐπ' ἐσχάτων τῶν ἡμερῶν κατελθόντα ἄνωθεν καὶ γεννηθέντα ἐκ παρθένου κατὰ τὰς γραφὰς καὶ ἄνθρωπον γενόμενον, μεσίτην θεοῦ καὶ ἀνθρώπων ἀπόστολόν τε τῆς πίστεως ἡμῶν καὶ ἀρχηγὸν τῆς ζωῆς, ὥς φησιν ὅτι »καταβέβηκα ἐκ τοῦ οὐρανοῦ, οὐχ ἵνα ποιῶ τὸ θέλημα τὸ ἐμόν, ἀλλὰ τὸ θέλημα τοῦ πέμψαντός με«, τὸν παθόντα ὑπὲρ ἡμῶν καὶ ἀναστάντα τῇ τρίτῃ ἡμέρᾳ καὶ ἀνελθόντα εἰς οὐρανούς, καὶ καθεσθέντα ἐν δεξιᾷ τοῦ πατρὸς καὶ πάλιν ἐρχόμενον μετὰ δόξης καὶ δυνάμεως κρῖναι ζῶντας καὶ νεκρούς.	And in one Lord Jesus Christ his only-begotten Son, God, through whom (are) all things, who was begotten from the Father before the ages, God from God, whole from whole, sole from sole, perfect from perfect, King from King, Lord from Lord, living Wisdom, true Light, Way, Truth, unchanging and unaltering, exact image of the Godhead and the substance and will and power and glory of the Father, first-born of all creation, who was in the beginning with God, God the Word according to the text in the Gospel [quotation of Jn 1:1, 3, and Col 1:17] who at the end of the days came down from above and was born of a virgin, according to the Scriptures, and became man, mediator between God and men, the apostle of our faith, author of life, as the text runs [quotation of Jn 6:38], who suffered for us and rose again the third day and ascended into heaven and is seated on the right hand of the Father and is coming again with glory and power to judge the living and the dead:
καὶ εἰς τὸ μνεῦμα τὸ ἅγιον, τὸ εἰς παράκλησιν καὶ ἁγιασμὸν καὶ τελείωσιν τοῖς πιστεύουσι διδόμενον, καθὼς καὶ ὁ κύριος ἡμῶν Ἰεσοῦς Χριστὸς διετάξατο τοῖς μαθηταῖς λέγων »πορευθέντες μαθητεύσατε πάντα τὰ ἕθνη βαπτίζοντες αὐτοὺς εἰς τὸ ὄνομα τοῦ πατρὸς καὶ τοῦ υἱοῦ καὶ τοῦ ἁγίου πνεύματος«, δηλονότι πατρός, ἀληθῶς πατρὸς ὄντος, υἱοῦ δὲ ἀληθῶς υἱοῦ ὄντος, τοῦ δὲ ἁγίου πνεύματος ἀληθῶς ἁγίου πνεύματος ὄντος, τῶν ὀνομάτων οὐχ ἁπλως οὐδὲ ἀργῶς κειμένων, ἀλλὰ σημαινόντων ἀρκιβῶς τὴν οἰκείαν ἑκάστου τῶν ὀνομαζομένων ὑπόστασίν τε καὶ τάξιν καὶ δόξαν, ὡς εἶναι τῇ μὲν ὑποστάσει τρία, τῇ δὲ σθμφωνίᾳ ἕν.	And in the Holy Spirit, who is given to those who believe for comfort and sanctification and perfection, just as our Lord Jesus Christ commanded his disciples, saying [quotation of Matt 28:19], obviously (in the name) of the Father who is really Father and the Son who is really Son and the Holy Spirit who is really Holy Spirit, because the names are not given lightly or idly, but signify exactly the particular hypostasis and order and glory of each of those who are named, so that they are three in hypostasis but one in agreement.
ταύτην οὖν ἔχοντες τὴν πίστιν καὶ ἐξ ἀρχῆς καὶ μέρχι τέλους ἔχοντες ἐνώπιον τοῦ θεοῦ καὶ τοῦ Χριστοῦ πᾶσαν αἱρετικὴν κακοδοξίαν ἀναθεματίζομεν. καὶ εἴ τις παρὰ τὴν ὑγιῆ τῶν γραφῶν [ὀρθὴν] πίστιν διδάσκει λέγων ἢ χρόνον ἢ καιρὸν ἢ αἰῶνα ἢ εἶναι ἢ γεγονέναι πρὸ τοῦ γεννηθῆναι τὸν υἱόν, ἀνἀθεμα ἔστω. καὶ εἴ τις παρὰ τὴν ὑγιῆ τῶν γραφῶν [ὀρθὴν] πίστιν διδάσκει λέγων ἢ χρόνον ἢ καιρὸν ἢ αἰῶνα ἢ εἶναι ἢ γεγονέναι πρὸ τοῦ γεννηθῆναι τὸν υἱόν, ἀνάθεμα ἔστω. καὶ εἴ τις λέγει τὸν υἱὸν κτίσμα ὡς ἒν τῶν κτισμάτων ἢ γέννημα ὡς ἣν τῶν γεννημαάτων ἢ ποίημα ὡς ἓν τῶν ποημάτων καὶ μὴ ὡς αἱ θεῖαι γραφαὶ παραδέδωκαν τῶν προειρημένων ἕκαστον [ἀφ' ἑκάστου], ἢ εἴ τι ἄλλο διδάσκει ἢ εὐαγγελίζεται, παρ' ὃ παρελάβομεν, ἀνάθεμα ἔστω. ἡμεῖς γὰρ πᾶσι τοῖς ἐκ τῶν θείων γραφῶν παραδεδομένοις ὑπό τε προφητῶν καὶ ἀποστόλων ἀληθινῶς τε καὶ ἐμφόβως καὶ πιστεύομεν καὶ ἀκολουθοῦμεν.	Since we hold this belief, and have held it from the beginning to the end, before God and Christ we condemn every form of heretical unorthodoxy. And if anybody teaches contrary to the sound, right faith of the Scriptures, alleging that either time or occasion or age exists or did exist before the Son was begotten, let him be anathema. And if anyone alleges that the Son is a creature like one of the creatures or a product (γἐννημα) like one of the products, or something made (ποἰημα) like one of the things that are made, and not as the Holy Scriptures have handed down concerning the subjects which have been treated one after another, or if anyone teaches or preaches anything apart from what we have laid down, let him be anathema. For we believe and follow everything that has been delivered from the Holy Scriptures and by the prophets and apostles truly and reverently.

The phrases 'God from God,' 'whole from whole', and similar ones in the Dedication Creed were intended to deny the idea that the Son was a piece of the father that had been broken off or separated. Arians rejected the idea of the Son as a piece of the Father, so this is another sense in which the Dedication Creed was friendly to Arians. However, Hanson considers the rejection of the idea of the Son as a piece of the Father to be an Origenist doctrine rather than specifically an Arian one. The distinction of hypostases within the Godhead is also reminiscent of Origen, so that the Dedication Creed can be considered 'Origenist.' Hanson also finds a possible influence of Asterius in the terminology of hypostases 'agreeing' (συμφωνίαν), a phrase found in the known fragments of Asterius.

The Dedication Creed was intended to replace the Nicene Creed. The Dedication Creed excluded the kind of Arianism originally proposed by and associated with Arius himself. Because of this, Simonetti believes that by 341, Eusebius of Nicomedia had shifted his views from his earlier support of Arius. On the other hand, the Dedication Creed resembled the doctrines taught by Eusebius of Caesarea prior to the Arian controversy. Thus, Hanson concludes that the intellectual ancestors of the Dedication Creed are Origen, Asterius, and Eusebius of Caesarea.

[The Dedication Creed] represents the nearest approach we can make to discovering the views of the ordinary educated Eastern bishop who was no admirer of the extreme views of Arius but who had been shocked and disturbed by the apparent Sabellianism of [the Nicene Creed], and the insensitiveness of the Western Church to the threat to orthodoxy which this tendency represented.

== The Macrostich - 344 ==
The remainder of the decade after the failed Council of Serdica of 343 was a period of seeking reconciliation. One of these attempts was the Macrostich (the Long Liner Manifesto) which was compiled in 344 in Antioch, the main center of Christianity in the East, and brought to the West in 345.

=== Western one-hypostasis theology ===
The Macrostich was developed in response to the views of the Western Church as expressed, particularly, by the manifesto of the Western delegation at the Council of Serdica of 343, which explicitly asserts one single hypostasis. It says:

“We have received and have been taught this … tradition: that there is one hypostasis, which the heretics (also) call ousia, of the Father and of the Son and of the Holy Spirit.” (Hanson, p. 301)

In other words, the Father, Son and Spirit are one single Person with one single Mind. There are different versions of one-hypostasis theology. In the second-century Monarchianism and in Modalism, Father, Son, and Spirit are simply three names for the same Person. When the Macrostich was written, the best-known versions of one-hypostasis theology were those of Marcellus, who was condemned for Sabellianism, and Athanasius, who believed that the Son is part of the Father. (See the discussion of the Dedication Creed.) But in all one-hypostasis theologies, there is only one single Person and Mind. That is what the West also generally believed, as indicated by the fact that the Council of Rome in 340, accepted Marcellus and Athanasius as orthodox.

=== Eastern three-hypostasis theology ===
In contrast, the Easterners believed that the Father, Son, and Spirit are three hypostases; three distinct Persons with three distinct Minds that are united by agreement. The Dedication Creed says this by describing the Father, Son, and Spirit as three hypostases. The Macrostich does not use the term hypostasis but uses ‘realities’ and ‘persons’ instead. It asserts “that there are three realities (πράγματα) or persons (πρόσωπα)" and condemns “those who treat Father, Son, and Spirit as three names of one reality (πράγμα) or person (πρόσωπον).”

It “argues against Marcellan doctrines which … treat the Word as ‘mere word of God and unexisting, having his being in another’.” (Ayres, p. 127) This shows that Marcellus believed that the Word or Son does not have distinct existence but is part of the Father. In contrast, the Macrostich “confesses the Son as ‘living God and Word, existing in himself’.” (Ayres, p. 128)

Although the Macrostich asserts three ‘Persons,’ it says that that does not assert “three gods” (Hanson, p. 310) because the Father alone exists without cause or beginning.

One-hypostasis theology has the highest claim on the unity of Father and Son because they are but one hypostasis (Person). The Macrostich explains the unity of Father and Son as that “Father and Son ‘are united with each other without mediation or distance’ and ... they ‘exist inseparably’, all the Father embosoming the Son, and all the Son hanging and adhering to the Father.” (Ayres, p. 128-9)

=== The Son of God ===
Arius said that the Son “is from non-existence.” In contrast, the Macristich says, He is “genuinely begotten from God alone.” (Hanson, p. 310)

Arius said, “there was when He (the Son) was not.” His enemies accused him of saying there was “time” when the Son was not. The Macrostich states: We do not envisage “an interval of time preceding him.” Only God who begot him timelessly, preceded Him. (Hanson, p. 310) “The Son of God existed before the ages.” (Hanson, p. 309) In other words, the Son had a beginning, but that beginning was before time even existed. Therefore, there never was “a time or age when He was not.”

In the one-hypostasis view, since the Father and Son are one single ‘Person’, the Son has existed for as long as the Father has. Consequently, the Father had never decided to beget the Son; the Father ‘always’ was Father, and the Son ‘always’ was Son. In contrast, the Macrostich says that the Father begat the Son by his counsel and his will. (Hanson, p. 309-10)

The Macrostich says that “the Son was not created as other creatures and products are produced; he cannot be compared with them.” He is the only being ever begotten by God. (Hanson, p. 310) All other creatures came into existence through the Son.

The Macrostich strongly affirms the subordination of the Son. (Hanson, p. 311) However, “though he be subordinate to his Father and God, yet, being before ages begotten of God, he is God according to his perfect and true nature.” (Ayres, p. 127) That the Macrostich also describes the Son both as subordinate and as God may sound confusing to the modern ear. See the discussion of the same point under the Dedication Creed.

=== The Holy Spirit ===
The Macrostich has a very scanty treatment of the Holy Spirit. It describes the Son as "God," and as "God from God," but does not refer to the Holy Spirit as such. On the contrary, it implies that the Holy Spirit is not God.

=== Ousia Language ===
Soon after, Nicaea, the term homoousios disappears from the Controversy and was only brought back in the 350s (see here). The Creeds of the 340s, therefore, including the Macrostich, do not refer to that term. The main issue was the number of hypostases in God.

The Nicene Creed says that the Son was begotten from the ousios (substance or essence) of the Father. The Dedication Creed of 341, which is, like the Macrostich, an Eastern creed, describes the Son as the image of the Father's ousia. In contrast, although the Macrostich says that He is “from God,” and “begotten,” it does not use the term ousia.

=== Mission Failed ===
The Macrostich, since it was intended as a reconciliation tool, avoids, as far as possible, controversial and non-biblical language. However, that mission failed. In 345, the Eastern delegation presented their manifesto to the Latin-speaking bishops in the western part of the empire. “The Council of Milan … gave audience to the Antiochenes with their creed. Before the Council would consider the Macrostich, however, they demanded that the Eastern bishops should condemn Arius. The Eastern delegation refused to do this, not assuredly because they were unwilling to condemn Arius, but because they thought it insulting to be suspected and arraigned in this way. They returned to Antioch, their purpose unaccomplished.” (Hanson, p. 312)

== First Sirmian Creed - 351 ==
While Emperor Constantius was in Sirmium in the winter of 351, a council was held there. (Hanson, p. 325) The focus of the council was Photinus, bishop of Sirmium, who was the most visible Sabellian at the time. Photinus was condemned for the fifth time and exiled. This Council also produced a creed which was the same as the Fourth Creed of the Dedication Council of 341 - discussed above - with twenty-six more anathemas added.

=== Mainly Anti-Sabellian ===
Three of the anathemas strike at Arianism but its main weight certainly is directed towards stamping Sabellianism generally. At least fourteen out of the twenty-six new anathemas are directed against Sabellianism. This reveals the core issue in this stage of the Arian Controversy, namely, between the one-hypostasis Sabellian theologies and the three-hypostases Eusebian theologies:

- In 325, the greatest winners at Nicaea were the Sabellians.
- In the decade after Nicaea, the exiled ‘Arians’ were reinstated and the Sabellian supporters of the Nicene Creed were removed from their positions.
- In 340, the Western Council of Rome vindicated Marcellus, the most prominent Sabellian at the time, as well as Athanasius, who also was a one-hypostasis theologian.
- The main purpose of the Eastern Dedication Creed of 341 is to oppose Sabellianism.
- In 343, the Western delegation at Serdica issue an explicit one-hypostasis manifesto.
- In 344, the Easterners issue the Macrostich, which explicitly asserts three hypostases.
- And now, in 351, the Easterners again produced a creed whose main weight certainly is directed against Sabellianism.

There are different forms of one-hypostasis (one Person) theologies. Some say that the Son simply is the same at the Father. Others say that the Son is part of the Father. Still others say that both Father and Son are aspects of the one Person. Sabellianism, therefore, is one of the one-hypostasis theologies. For a further discussion, see the Macrostich above.

=== First mention of homoousios ===
As mentioned above, the Nicene Creed and homoousios disappear from the Controversy soon after Nicaea and was only brought back into the Controversy in the 350s. Athanasius reintroduced homoousios into the Controversy only in the 350s. Here, in the 351-creed, we see the first references to homoousios. Two of the 26 anathemas oppose ousia language.

== The Second Sirmian Creed - 357 ==
In the year 357, a small council in Sirmium produced a creed which Hanson regards as “a landmark” because “it was also a catalyst” (Hanson, p. 347) because it defined Arianism and reduced the level of confusion.

The Eastern Church is often regarded as anti-Nicene. What is surprising about this creed is that it was a Western creed, prepared in Latin (Hanson, p. 346). For example, Ossius, who also chaired the Nicene Council, was one of the signatories.

Hanson defines this as an Arian creed, not in the sense that it reproduces all Arius' chief doctrines but because of its drastic subordination of the Son to the Father. One of the ‘Arian’ characteristics of this creed is that the Son suffered. In pro-Nicene theology, the Son of God has the same substance as the Father and, therefore, cannot suffer. The opponents of this creed called it “The Blasphemy of Sirmium” and “Ossius’ lunacy.” (Hanson, p. 345)

While Sirmium 351 had not only omitted ousia language, but positively condemned some uses of that language, the confession of 357 even more strongly argues against ousia language, condemning all ousia language; not because the ousia-statements in the Nicene Creed are untrue but because the Bible does not say anything about God's substance and it is beyond human understanding.

This was the first creed to use the term ‘homoiousios’. By rejecting all ousia language, this creed also attacks the Dedication Creed which said that the Son is the image of the Father's substance. As such, this was a Homoian creed. Homoians said that the Son is “like” the Father but rejected all ousia language. This creed marks the emergence of the Homoian Arians as a visible movement.

The Second Sirmian Creed was written in Latin and is preserved in the writings of Hilary of Poitiers.

Second Sirmian Creed	English translation
Cum nonnulla putaretur esse de fide disceptatio, diligenter omnia apud Sirmium tractata sunt et discussa, praesentibus sanctissimis fratribus et coepiscopis nostris, Valente, Ursacio, et Germinio.	Since there was thought to be no little difference concerning the faith, all the points were carefully considered and discussed at Sirmium. Our brothers and fellow-bishops Valens, Ursacius, and Germinius were present.
Unum constat Deum esse omnipotentem et patrem, sicut per universum orbem creditur: et unicum filium ejus Jesum Christum Dominum salvatorem nostrum, ex ipso ante saecula genitum.	It is agreed that there is one almighty God and Father, as is believed throughout the whole world, and his only Son Jesus Christ the lord, our Saviour, born (genitum) from him before the ages;
Duos autem deos nec posse nec debere praedicari; quia ipse Dominus dixit: Ibo ad patrem meum et ad patrem vestrum, ad Deum meum et ad Deum vestrum (Joan. xx, 17).	but there cannot be two gods, nor should they be preached, as the text runs [Jn 20:17].
Ideo omnium Deus unus est, sicut Apostolus docuit. An Judaeorum Deus tantum? nonne et gentium? Imo et gentium. Quoniam quidem unus Deus, qui justificat circumcisionem ex fide, et praeputium per fidem (Rom. III, 29, 30). Sed et Caetera convenerunt, nec ullam habere potuerunt discrepantiam.	Therefore, there is one God of all, as the apostle taught [Rom 3:29, 30], and the rest (of the passage, or of the Scriptures) agrees and can contain no ambiguity.
Quod vero quosdam aut multos movebat de substantia, quae graece usia appellatur, id est (ut expressius intelligatur), homousion, aut quod dicitur homoeusion, nullam omnino fieri oportere mentionem; nec quemquam praedicare ea de causa et ratione quod nec in divinis Sripturis contineatur, et quod super hominis scientiam sit, nec quisquam possit nativitatem Filii enarrare, de quo Scriptum est, Generationem ejus quis enarrabit (Esai. LIII, 8)?	But as for the fact that some, or many, are concerned about substance (substantia) which is called usia in Greek, that is, to speak, more explicitly, homousion, or homoeusion as it is called, there should be no mention of it whatever, nor should anyone preach it. And this is the cause and reason, that it is not included in the divine Scriptures, and it is beyond man's knowledge nor can anyone declare the birth of the Son, and it is written on this subject [Isa 53:8].
Scire autem manifestum est solum Patrem quomodo genuerit filium suum, et Filium quomodo genitus sit a Patre.	For it is clear that only the Father knows how he begot his Son, and the Son how he was begotten by the Father.
Nulla ambiguitas est, majorem esse Patrem. Nulli potest dubium esse, Patrem honore, dignitate, claritate, majestate, et ipso nomine patris majorem esse Filio, ipso testante, Qui me misit, major me est (Joan. XIV, 28).	There is no uncertainty about the Father being greater: it cannot be doubted by anyone that the Father is greater in honour, in dignity, in glory, in majesty in the very name of "Father", for he himself witnesses [Jn 14:28, in the form "he who sent me is greater than I"].
Et hoc catholicum esse nemo ignorat, duas personas esse Patris et Filii, majorem Patrem, Filium subjectum cum omnibus his quae ipsi Pater subjecit.	And nobody is unaware that this is catholic doctrine, that there are two Persons (personas) of the Father and the Son, and that the Father is greater, and the Son is subjected in common with all the things which the Father subjected to him;
Patrem initium non habere, invisibilem esse, immortalem esse, impassibilem esse.	that the Father has no beginning, is invisible, immortal, and impassible;
Filium autem natum esse ex Patre, Deum ex Deo, lumen ex lumine.	but that the Son is born from the Father, God from God, Light from Light,
Cujus Filii generationem, ut ante dictum est, neminem scire nisi Patrem suum.	whose generation as Son, as has been said already, no one knows except the Father;
Ipsum autem Filium Dei Dominum et Deum nostrum, sicuti legitur, carnem vel corpus, id est, hominem suscepisse ex utero virginis Mariae, sicut Angelus praedicavit (Luc. I, 31).	and that the Son of God himself our Lord and God, as it is said, assumed flesh or body, that is man from the womb of the Virgin Mary, as the angel foretold.
Ut autem Scripturae omnes docent, et praecipue ipse magister gentium Apostolus, hminem suscepisse de Maria Virgine, per quem compassus est.	As all the Scriptures teach, and especially the teacher of the Gentiles himself, the apostle, he took human nature (hominem) from the Virgin Mary, and it was through this (man) that he suffered.
Illa autem clausula est totius fidei et illa confirmatio, quod Trinitas semper servanda est, sicut legimus in Evangelio: Ite et baptizate omnes gentes in nomine Patris et Filii et Spiritus Sancti (Matth. XXVIII, 19).	But that is the summary of the whole faith and the confirmation of it, that the Trinity should always be preserved, as we read in the gospel [Matt 28:19].
Integer, perfectus numerus Trinitatis est.	
Paracletus autem Spiritus per Filium est; qui missus venit juxta promissum, ut Apostolos et omnes credentes instrueret, doceret, sanctificaret.	And the Comforter the Spirit is through the Son, who was sent and came according to the promise, so that he might support, teach and sanctify the apostles and all the believers.

The Second Sirmian Creed aroused strong opposition from pro-Nicene theologians; Hilary of Poitiers called it the Blasphemy of Sirmium and Ossius' lunacy.

The Second Sirmian Creed avoids the following beliefs characteristic of Arius' own beliefs: it does not discuss the relation of Son to Logos, it does not say that the Son was produced out of nothing, and it does not state that the Son is created, using instead terms translatable as begotten and born. However it is Arian in subordinating the Son to the Father, insisting on a unique status for the Father, rejecting the concept of substance (ousia), and asserting that the Son suffered by means of his body (reflecting the Arian belief that God the Father did not suffer). The Second Dedication Creed does not follow the Eunomian Arianism. It represents instead the Arians known as Homoian, who had broken with some of Arius' beliefs and refused to accept Eunomius'.

== The Dated Creed ==
"In AD 359 Constantius decided to emulate his father's action in calling Nicaea and summon a general council." He called a small council of leading bishops in Sirmium to produce a document that, he hoped, would be signed by bishops on opposing sides of the Arian controversy, bringing an end to the conflict. Constantius brought together advocates of the Homoiousian position and of the Homoian Arian position, while excluding the extremes on either side of the controversy, represented by the supporters of Athanasius on the Nicene side and the Eunomians on the Arian side.

"The creed on which they finally agreed asserts, on the one hand, that the Son is 'like the Father in all respects, as the Holy Scriptures also declare and teach'." "On the other hand, it asserts that all ousia language should be avoided, because it was inserted in the creed of Nicaea 'though not familiar to the masses', because it caused 'disturbance', and because it is unscriptural."

"The creed caused Basil of Ancyra some difficulty and he only signed by adding, after his name, that this 'likeness' was also according to 'being'. Thus, although Basil of Ancyra was influential with the imperial authorities at one point during 358–9, it was not for long, and he never seems fully to have overcome long-standing Homoian influence at court."

"This creed is known as the 'Dated creed' because the prologue identifies the date of its promulgation."

== The Creed of Nike ==
The Homoiousians had emerged only a year before, at the Council of Ancyra of 358. This council was called by Basil of Ancyra to discuss allegations made by George of Laodicea that the bishop of Antioch was encouraging extreme Arian positions such as Eunomianism, and specifically the doctrine that the Father and Son are unlike in substance. The Council of Ancyra of 358 included bishops Basil of Ancyra, Macedonius of Constantinople, Eugenius of Nicaea, and Eustathius of Sebaste. George of Laodicea was a signatory to the statement it produced though not present.

The position taken at the Council of Ancyra has often been called Semi-Arianism, but today is more often called Homoiousian theology. Hanson emphasizes that this group, centered on Basil of Ancyra, did not use the word homoiousian themselves. Their formula was that the Father and Son are 'like in ousia' (ὅμοιος κατ' οὐσίαν). They argued that while it was possible to state that the Father was creator (ktistes) and the Son, creature (ktisma), they were also Father and Son. Since all fathers beget sons that are like them in ousia, this must be so of the Father and Son. Therefore, to refer to the Father and Son without the notion of similar ousia is to reduce the relation to one of creator and creature. This group also opposed the idea of homoousios, or consubstantiality, for following their line of argumentation, Father and Son did not have the same but only like substance; assuming consubstantiality could reduce the Son to a part of the Father, or even suggest that Father and Son were in fact the same being, which was considered an approach to the Sabellian heresy.

Following the Council of Ancyra, Basil of Ancyra traveled to Sirmium with a delegation including Eustathius of Sebaste and Eleusius of Cyzicus. This delegation gained the approval of Constantius II, who declared his belief that the Son was like the Father in ousia (κατ'οὐσίαν ὅμοιος τῷ πατρί), the homoiousian position. A Fourth Council of Sirmium was called in which the homoiousians (Basil, Eustathius, and Eleusius) met with the Homoian Arians (Valens, Ursacius, and Germinius) along with some other bishops from North Africa. Since these groups appeared were able to work out common statements of belief, Constantius decided to call a larger council to try to end the Arian controversy. In preparation for this council, Constantius asked for a smaller council to meet to prepare a creed that attendants would be asked to assent to. This smaller preparatory council was the Fifth Council of Sirmium, held in 359.

Those present at the Fifth Council of Sirmium were Germinius of Sirmium, Valens of Mursa, and Ursacius of Singidunum, Basil of Ancyra, George of Alexandria, Pancratius of Pelusium, and Mark of Arethusa. According to Germinius, after a long night's discussion they agreed to accept the formula proposed by Mark of Arethusa, 'the Son like the Father in everything as the holy Scriptures declare and teach.' The creed was written by Mark of Arethusa and was precisely dated to 22 May 359. For this reason it is often called the Dated Creed instead of the Fourth Sirmian Creed.

Following the Fifth Council of Sirmium, Constantius II summoned Christian bishops to a general church council. To avoid conflict between Western and Eastern churches, he summoned the Eastern bishops to meet at Seleucia and the Western bishops at Ariminium. His intention was that both councils would discuss and approve the Dated Creed. At the Council of Seleucia approximately 150 bishops attended. The largest contingent was homoiousian, led by Eleusius of Cyzicus, George of Laodicea, and Silvanus of Tarsus. Basil of Ancyra, Macedonius of Constantinople, and Eustathius of Sebaste did not attend as other bishops had them under accusation for ecclesiastical misdemeanors. The Homoians were also in attendance, represented by Acacius of Caesarea, George of Alexandria, Uranius of Tyre, and Eudoxius of Antioch. The Eunomians were not present. The Council did not agree to sign the Dated Creed. Instead, Acacius submitted his own creed for consideration. This creed was not accepted by a majority, and the council eventually dissolved without coming to any agreement. The various groups at the Council sent representatives to Constantinople, where Constantius II was now in residence.

Meanwhile, Western bishops were meeting at the Council of Ariminum. 400 bishops assembled at the Council. The Homoian Arians were represented by Valens of Mursa, Ursacius of Singidunum, Germinius of Sirmium, Gaius and Demophilus. This group proposed the Dated Creed, but the assembled bishops rejected it and reaffirmed their adherence to the Nicene Creed. They sent ten bishops to meet with Constantius II at Constantinople, but the Emperor refused to see them and made them wait at Adrianople. Constantius them moved the entire council from Ariminum to a placed called Nike in Thrace. He them sent Valens of Mursa back to pressure the bishops to sign a version of the Dated Creed. The Western bishops, and especially Claudius of Picenum made Valens publicly anathematize a series of Arian beliefs, and publicly reject Arius and Arianism. A series of anathemas were added to the Dated Creed that watered down its sense so that it no longer appeared a truly Arian creed. The bishops then signed the creed and Constantius allowed them to return to their homes for the winter.

The homoiousian group from the Council of Seleucia, now in Constantinople, was finally convinced to sign a creed similar to the Dated Creed, on 31 December 359. The words 'in all respects' were eliminated after 'like the Father', so that the homoiousian formula 'like the Father in all respects', which had been in the Dated Creed, was not in the Creed of Nike. Further, two sentences were added: one of them argued that the Father, Son, and Holy Spirit should not be regarded as having one 'hypostasis', while the other one anathematized all beliefs opposed to this creed. The creed signed by the homoiousians on New Year's Eve, 359, and by the Council of Ariminum relocated to Nike, has been called Creed of Nike, but is also known as the Creed of Constantinople since some of the Eastern bishops signed in Constantinople. However it should not be confused with the more famous Creed of Constantinople of 381.

Hanson English translation	Dated Creed (Athanasius version)	Creed of Nike (Theodoret version)	Creed of Nike (Athanasius version)
We believe in one sole and true God, the Father Almighty, creator and maker of all things: And in one only-begotten Son of God who before all ages and before all beginning and before all conceivable time and before all comprehensible substance (οὐσίας) was begotten impassibly from God through whom the ages were set up and all things came into existence, begotten as only-begotten, sole from the sole Father, like to the Father who begot him, according to the Scriptures, whose generation nobody understands except the Father who begot him.	Πιστεύομεν εἰσ ἕνα τὸν μόνον καὶ ἀληθινὸν θεόν πατέρα παντοκράτορα καὶ κτίστην καὶ δημιουργὸν τῶν πἀντων, καὶ εἰς ἕνα μονογενῆ υἱὸν τοῦ θεοῦ, τὸν πρὸ πάντων τῶν αἰώνων καὶ πρὸ πάσης ἀρχῆς καὶ πρὸ παντὸς ἐπινοουμένου χρόνου καὶ πρὸ πάσης καταληπτῆς οὐσίας γεγεννημένον ἀπαθῶς ἐκ τοῦ ἐκ τοῦ θεοῦ, δι' οὗ τὰ πάντα ἐγένετο, γεγεννημένον δὲ μονογενῆ, μόνον ἐκ μόνου τοῦ πατρὸς, θεὸν ἐκ θεοῦ, ὅμοιον τῷ γεννήσαντι αὐτὸν πατρί κατὰ τὰς γραφάς, οὗ τὴν γένεσιν οὐδεὶς επισταται εἰ μὴ μόνος ὁ γεννήσας αὐτὸν πατήρ.	Πιστεύομεν εἰσ ἕνα καὶ μόνον αληθινὸν Θεὸν, Πατέρα παντοκράτορα, ἐξ οὗ τὰ πάντα. Καὶ εἰς τὸν μονογενῆ Υἱὸν τοῦ Θεοῦ, τὸν πρὸ πάντων αἰώνων καὶ πρὸ πάσης ἀρχῆς γεννηθέντα ἐκ τοῦ Θεοῦ, δι' οὗ τὰ πάντα ἐγένετο, τὰ ὁρατὰ καἰ τἀ ἀόρατα. Γεννηθέντα δὲ μονογενῆ μόνον ἐκ μόνoυ τοῦ Πατρὸς, θεὸν ἐκ θεοῦ· ὅμοιον τῷ γεννήκοτι αὐτὸν Πατρὶ κατὰ τὰς Γραφάς. Οὗ τὴν γέννεσιν οὐδεὶς οἶδεν, εἰ μὴ μόνος ὁ γεννήσας αὐτὸν Πατήρ.	Πιστεύομεν εἰσ ἕνα θεόν, πατέρα παντοκράτορα, ἐξ οὗ τὰ πάντα, καὶ εἰς τὸν μονογενῆ υἱὸν τοῦ θεοῦ, τὸν πρὸ πάντων αἰώνων καὶ πρὸ πάσης ἀρχῆς γεννηθέντα ἐκ τοῦ θεοῦ, δι' οὗ τὰ πάντα ἐγένετο, τὰ ὁρατά καἰ τἀ ἀόρατα, γεννηθέντα δὲ μονογενῆ, μόνον ἐκ μόνου τοῦ πατρὸς, θεὸν ἐκ θεοῦ, ὅμοιον τῷ γεννήσαντι αὐτὸν πατρί κατὰ τὰς γραφάς, οὗ τὴν γένεσιν οὐδεὶς γινώσκει εἰ μὴ μόνος ὁ γεννήσας αὐτὸν πατήρ.
Him we know to be the only-begotten Son of God, who came down from the heavens at the Father's bidding in order to put an end to sin, and was born (γεννηθέντα) from Mary the Virgin, and went around with his disciples and fulfilled all the strategy (οἰκονομίαν) according to his Father's will; he was crucified and died and went down to the subterranean places and fulfilled his mission there, and the gate-keepers of Hell (Hades) shuddered when they saw him; and he rose from the dead on the third day and conversed with his disciples and fulfilled all the dispensation (οἰκονομίαν) and when the forty days were fulfilled he was taken up into heaven and is seated at the right hand of the Father, and will come again on the last day of the resurrection in his Father's glory to reward everyone according to his deeds:	τοῦτον ἴσμεν τοῦ θεοῦ μονογενῆ υἰὸν, νεύματί πατρικῷ παραγενόμενον ἐκ τῶν οὐρανῶν εἰς αθέτησιν ἁμαρτίας καὶ γεννηθέντα ἐκ Μαρίας τῆς παρθένου καὶ ἀναστραφέντα μετὰ τῶν μαθητῶν καὶ πᾶσαν τὴν οἰκονομίαν πληρώσαντα κατὰ τὴν πατρικὴν βούλησιν, σταθρωθέντα καὶ ἀποθανόντα καὶ εἰς τὰ καταχθόνια κατεληλθόντα καὶ τὰ ἐκεῖσε οἰκονομήσαντα, ὅν »πυλωροὶ ᾅδου ἰδόντεσ«, ἔφριξαν καὶ ἀναστάντα ἐκ νεκρῶν τῇ τρίτῃ ἡμήρᾳ καὶ ἀναστραφέντα μετὰ τῶν μαθητῶν καὶ πᾶσαν τὴν οἰκονομίαν πληρώσαντα καὶ πεντήκοντα ἡμερῶν πληρουμἐνων ἀναληφθέντα εἰς τοὺς οὐρανοὺς καὶ καθεζόμενον ἐκ δεξιῶν τοῦ πατρὸς καὶ ἐλευσόμενον ἐν τῇ ἐσχάτῃ ἡμέρᾳ τῆς ἀναστάσεως ἐν τῇ δόξῃ τῇ πατρικῇ ἀποδιδόντα ἑκάστῳ κατὰ τὰ ἔργα αὐτοῦ.	Tοῦτον οἴδαμεν μονογενῆ Θεοῦ Υἰὸν, πέμποντος τοῦ Πατρός, παραγεγενῆσθαι ἐκ τῶν οὐρανῶν, καθὼς γέγραπται, εἰς καθαίρεσιν ἀμαρτίας καὶ θανἀτου· καὶ γεννηθέντα ἐκ Πνεύματος ἀγίου, ἐκ Μαρίας τῆς Παρθένου καθὼς γέγραπται, κατὰ σάκρα· καὶ συναναστραφέντα μετὰ τῶν μαθητῶν· καὶ πάσης τῆς οἰκονομίας πληρωθείσης κατὰ τὴν βούλησιν τοῦ Πατρὸς, σταυρῷ προσηλωθέντα, ἀποθανόντα καὶ ταφέντα καὶ εἰς τὰ καταχθόνια κατεληλθόντα· ὅν αὐτὸς ὁ ᾄδης ἔτρωμαζε· καὶ ἀνέλθόντα ἀπὸ τῶν νεκρῶν τῇ τρίτῃ ἡμἠρᾳ συναναστραφέντα ἡμερῶν πληρουμένων· καὶ αναληφθέντα εἰς τοὺς οὐρανοὺς, καὶ καθεζόμενον ἐκ δεξιῶν τοῦ Πατρὸς· ἐρχόμενον δὲ τῇ ἐσχάτῃ ἡμέρᾳ τῆς ἀναστάσεως μετὰ δόξης πατρικῆς, ἀποδοῦναι ἑκαστῳ κατὰ τὰ ἔργα αὐτοῦ.	τοῦτον οἴδαμεν μονογενῆ θεοῦ υἰὸν πέμποντος τοῦ πατρός παραγεγενῆσθαι ἐκ τῶν οὐρανῶν, ὡς γέγραπται, ἐπὶ καταλύσει τῆς ἀμαρτίας καὶ τοῦ θανἀτου καὶ γεννηθέντα ἐκ πνεύματος ἀγίου, ἐκ Μαρίας τῆς παρθένου τὸ κατὰ σάρκα, ὠς γέγραπται, καὶ ἀναστραφέντα μετὰ τῶν μαθητῶν καὶ πάσης τῆς οἰκονομίας πληρωθείσης κατὰ τὴν πατρικὴν βούλησιν σταθρωθέντα καὶ ἀποθανόντα καὶ ταφέντα καὶ εἰς τὰ καταχθόνια κατεληλυθέναι, ὅντινα καὶ αὐτὸς ὁ ᾄδης ἔπτηξεν, ὅστις καὶ ἀνέστη ἐκ τῶν νεκρῶν τῇ τρίτῃ ἡμήρᾳ καὶ διέτριψε μετὰ τῶν μαθητῶν, καὶ πληρωθεισῶν τεσσαράκοντα ἡμερῶν ἀνελήφθη εἰς τοὺς οὐρανοὺς καὶ καθέζεται ἐν δεξιᾷ τοῦ πατρὸς ἐλευσόμενος ἐν τῇ ἐσχάτῃ ἡμέρᾳ τῆς ἀναστάσεως ἐν τῇ πατρικῇ δόξῃ, ἵνα ἀποδῷ ἑκάστῳ κατὰ τὰ ἔργα αὐτοῦ.
And in the Holy Spirit whom the only-begotten of God Jesus Christ himself promised to send to the race of men, the Paraclete, according to the text [conflation of Jn 16.7, 13f.; 14.16f; 15.26].	καὶ εἰς τὸ ἅγιον πνεῦμα, ὅ αὐτὸς ὁ μονογενὴς ἐπηγγείλατο πέμψαι τῷ γένει τῶν ἀνθρώπων, τὸν παράκληετον, κατὰ τὸ γεγραμμένον· » ἀπέρχομαι πρὸς τὸν πατέρα μου καὶ παρακαλέσω τόν πατἐρα καὶ ἄλλον παράκλητον πέμψει ὑμῖν τὸ πνεῦμα τῆς ἀληθεάς, ἐκεῖνος ἐκ τοῦ ἐμοῦ λήψεται και διδάξει καὶ ὑπομνήσει ὑμᾶς πάντα«.	καὶ εἰς το Πνεῦμα ἅγιον, ὅπερ αὐτὸς ὁ μονογενὴς τοῦ Θεοῦ υἱὸς Ἰησοῦς Χριστὸς Θεὸς ὁ Κύριος ἐπηγγείλατο ἀποστεῖλαι τῷ γένει τῶν ἀνθρώπων τὸν Παράκληετον, καθὼς γέγραπται, τὸ Πνεῦμα τῆς ἀληθείας. Ὅπερ καὶ αὐτὸς ἀπέστειλεν ἀνελθῶν εἰς τοὺς οῤανούς, καὶ καθίσας ἐν δεξιᾷ τοῦ Πατρός· ἐκεῖθεν δὲ ἐρχόμενοσ κρῖναι ζῶντας καῖ νεκρούς.	καὶ εἰς το ἅγιον πνεῦμα, ὅπερ αὐτὸς ὁ μονογενὴς τοῦ θεοῦ υἱὸς ὁ Χριστὸς ὁ κύριος καὶ ὁ θεὸς ἡμῶν ἐπηγγείλατο πέμπειν τῷ γένει τῶν ἀνθρώπων παράκληετον, καθάπερ γέγραπται· »τὸ πνεῦμα τῆς ἀληθεάς«, ὁπερ αὐτοῖς ἔπεμψεν, ὅτε ἀνῆλθεν εἰς τοὺς οῤανούς.
The word ousia, because when it was naively inserted by our fathers though not familiar to the masses, it caused disturbance, and because the Scriptures do not contain it, we have decided should be removed, and that there should be absolutely no mention of ousia in relation to God for the future, because the Scriptures make no mention at all of the ousia of the Father and the Son.	τὸ δἐ ὄνομα τῆς οὐσίας, ὁπερ ἁπλούστερον ὑπὸ τῶν πατέρων τεθεῖσθαι, ἀγνοούμενον τῶν λαῶν σκάνδαλον φέρειν, διὰ τὸ μήτε τὰς γραφὰς τοῦτο περιέχειν, ἤπεσε περιαιρεθῆναι καὶ παντελῶς μηδεμίαν μνήμην οὐσίας ἐπὶ θεοῦ εἶναι τοῦ λοιποῦ διὰ τὸ τὰς θείας γραφὰς μηδαμοῦ περὶ πατρὸς καὶ υἱοῦ oὐσίας μεμνῆσθαι.	τὸ δἐ ὄνομα τῆς οὐσίας, ὁπερ ἁπλούστερον ἐνετέθη ὑπὸ τῶν Πατέρων, ἀγνοούμενον δἐ τοῖς λαοῖς σκάνδαλον ἔφερε, διὰ τὸ ἐν ταῖς Γραφαῖς τοῦτο μὴ ἐμφέρεσθαι, ἥρεσε ῀εριαιρεθῆναι, καὶ παντελῶς μηδεμἰαν μνήμην οὐσίας τοῦ λοιποῦ γίνεσθαι, διὰ τὸ μάλιστα τὰς θείας Γραφὰς μηδαμοῦ περὶ τοῦ Πατρὸς καὶ τοῦ Υἱοῦ οὐσίας μεμνῆσθαι.	τὸ δἐ ὄνομα τῆς οὐσίας, ὁπερ ἁπλουστερον ὑπὸ τῶν πατέρων ἐτέθη, ἀγνοούμενον δἐ τοῖς λαοῖς σκάνδαλον ἔφερε, διότι μηδὲ ἁι γραφαὶ τοῦτο περιέχοθυσιν, ἤπεσε περιαιρεθῆναι καὶ ᾶντελῶς μηδεμἰαν μνήμην τοῦ λοιποῦ γίνεσυαι, ἐπειδήπερ καὶ αἱ θεῖαι γραφαὶ οὐδαμῶς ἑμνημόνεθσαν περὶ οὐσίας πατρὸς καὶ υἱοῦ.
nor should one hypostasis be applied to the Person (prosopon) of the Father and the Son and Holy Spirit.		Μήτε μὴν δεῖν ἐπὶ προσώπου Πατρὸς καῖ Υἱοῦ καὶ ἁγίου Πνεύματος μίαν ὑπόστασιν ὀνομάζεσθαι.	καὶ γὰρ οὐδὲ ὀφείλει ὑπόστασις περὶ πατρὸς καῖ υἱοῦ καὶ ἁγίου πνεύματος ὁνομάζεσθαι.
But we declare that the Son is like the Father in all respects (ὄμοιον κατὰ πάντα), as the holy Scriptures also declare and teach.	ὅμοιον δὲ λέγομεν τὸν υἱὸν τῷ πατρί κατὰ πάντα ὡς καὶ ἁι ἅγιαι γραφαὶ λέγουσί τε καὶ διδάσκουσι.	Ὅμοιον δὲ λέγομεν τῷ πατρί τὸν υἱόν, καθὼς καὶ ἁι θεῖαι γραφαῖ λἐγουσι καὶ διδάσκουσι.	ὅμοιον δὲ λέγομεν τῷ πατρί τὀν υἱόν, ὡς λἐγουσιν ἁι θεῖαι γραφαῖ καῖ διδάσκουσι.
And let all the heresies which have already been previously condemned, and any others which have recently grown up opposed to the creed set out here, be anathema.		Πάσας δὲ τὰς αἱρέσεις, τὰς ἤδη πρότερον καθαιρεθείσας, ἢ καὶ εἴ τινες νεωστὶ ανεφύησαν ὑπεναντίαι ταύτης τῆς γραφῆς τῆς ἐκτεθείσης, ἀνάθεμα ἔστωσαν.	πᾶσαι δὲ αἱ αἱρέσεις αἵ τε ἤδη πρότερον κατεκρίθησαν, καὶ αἵτινες ἑάν καινότεραι γένωνται, ἑναντίαι τυγχάνουσαι τῆς ἑκτεθείσης ταξυτης γραφῆς, ἁνάθεμα ἔστωσαν.

In 360, a follow-up council was held in Constantinople, the Council of Constantinople of 360. Acacius of Caesarea was now Constantius' main advisor, Basil of Ancyra having lost influence as the homoiousian formula 'like in all respects' had been unable to convince the bishops at the councils of Ariminum and Seleucia. The Council of Constantinople promulgated once again the Creed of Nike as it had been signed by the twin councils the year before. For a time, the Creed of Nike became the official orthodox creed, replacing the Nicene Creed. It also became the creed of most Arians. Homoian Arianism replaced the old ideas of Arius as the leading variant of Arianism, and also gained strength against the rival Arian variant of Eunomianism.

== The Creed of Acacius ==
During the Council of Seleucia in 359, Acacius of Caesarea produced his own creed, which he hoped the assembled bishops would agree to.

Creed of Acacius	Hanson paraphrase and translation
Ἡμεῖς συνελθόντες ἐν Σελευκείᾳ τῃς Ἰσαυράς κατὰ τὸ βασιλικὸν βούλημα, τῇ χθὲς ἡμέρᾳ, ἧτις ἦν πρὸ πέντε Καλανδῶν Ὀκτωβρίων, πᾶσαν σπουδὴν ἐθέμεθα, μετὰ πάσης εὑταξίας τὴν εἰρήνην τῇ Ἐκκλησίᾳ φυλάξαι, καὶ περὶ τῆς πἰστεως εὐσταθῶς διαλαβεῖν, ὡς προσέταξεν ὁ θεοφιλέστατος βασιλεὺς ἡμῶν Κωνστάντιος, κατὰ τὰς προφητικὰς καὶ εύαγγελικὰς φωνὰς, καὶ μηδὲν παρὰ τὰς θεάς Γραφὰς εἰσενέγκαι τῇ Ἐκκλησιαστικῇ πίστει. Ἐπειδὴ δέ τινες ἐν τῇ σθνόδῳ, τοὺς μὲν ἡμῶν ὕβρισαν, τοὺς δὲ ἐπεστὀμισαν, οὐ συγχνροῦντες λαλεῖν· τοὐς δὲ ἀπέκλεισαν ἄκοντας· καὶ τοὺς καθῃρημένους δὲ έκ διαφόρων ἐκαρχιῶν εἶκων μεθ'ἑαυτῶν· ὡς πανταχόθεν θορύβου πλήρη γενέσθαι τὴν σύνοδον, καθὼς καὶ ὁ λαμπρότατος ἡγούμενος τῆς ἐπαρχίας Λαυρίκιος, καὶ ὁ λαμπρότατος κόμης Λεωνᾶς αὐτοωϊᾳ παρέλαβον, τούτου ἕνεκεν διαλαλοῦμεν ταῦτα· Ὡς οὐ φεϋγομεν τὴν ἐκτεθεῖσαν αὐθεντικὴν πίστιν ἐν τοῖς ἐγκαινίοις τοῖς κατὰ τὴν Ἀντιόχειαν, προκομίζοντες αὐτὴν, εἰ καὶ τὸ ὁμοούσιον καὶ το ὁμοιούσιον ἐν τοῖς παρελθοῦσι χρόνοις, καὶ μέχρι νῦν· ἀλλὰ καὶ ἀρτίως λέγεται καινοτομεῖσθαι ὑπό τινων τὸ μὲν ὁμοούσιον καὶ τὸ ὁμοιούσιον ἐκβάλλομεν, ὡς ἀλλότριον τῶν Γραφῶν, τὸ δὲ ἀνόμοιον ἀναθεματίζομεν· καὶ πάντας ὅσοι τοιοῦτοι τυγχάνουσιν, ἀλλοτρίους ἠγούμεθα τῆς Ἐκκλησίας. Τὸ δὲ ὅμοιον τοῦ Υἱοῦ πρὸς τὸν Πατέρα σαφῶς ὁμολογοῦμεν, κατὰ τὸν Ἀπόστολον τὸν λέγοντα περὶ τοῦ Υἱοῦ, Ὅς ἐστιν εἰκῶν τοῦ ἀοράτου.	It began by referring to the confusion produced by varying opinions and by the presence of some who were under accusation, paid a compliment to the imperial officials, expressed the writer's readiness to accept the Second ('Dedication') Creed of Antioch 341, rejected both homoousion and homoiousion, and also anhomoion as unsuitable and commended 'like' (homoios) simply, after the example of Col I:15, and then continued:

Ὁμολογοῦμεν δὲ καὶ πιστεύομεν εῖς ἕνα Θεὸν, Πατέρα παντοκράτορα· ποιητὲν οὐρανῶν καὶ γῆς, ὁρατῶν καὶ ἀοράτῶν.	We confess and believe in one God, the Father Almighty, maker of heaven and earth, of things visible and invisible;
Πιστεξυομεν δὲ καὶ εἰς τὸν Κύριον ἡμῶν Ἰησοῦν Χριστὸν τὸν Υἱὸν αὐτοῦ, τὸν ἐξ αὐτοῦ γεννηθέντα ἀαθῶς πρὸ πάντων τῶν αἰώνων, Θεὸν Λόγον ἐκ Θεοῦ μονογενῆ, φῶς, ζωὴν, ἀλήθειαν, σοφίαν· δι' οὗ τὰ πάντα ἐγένετο, τά τε ἐν τοῖς οὐρανοῖς, καὶ τὰ ἐπὶ τῆς γ῀ες εἴτε ὁρατὰ εἴτε ἀόρατα.	And we believe in our Lord Jesus Christ his Son, who was begotten impassibly from him before all the ages, God Logos God from God, only-begotten, Light, Life, Truth, Wisdom, Power, through whom all things came into existence, things in the heaven and things on the earth, whether visible or invisible.
Τοῦτον πιστεύομεν ἐπὶ σθντελείᾳ ἐκ τῆς ἁγίας Παρθένου Μαρίας· καὶ ἐνανθρωπήσαντα, παθόντα ὑπὲρ τῶν ἀμαρτιῶν ἡμῶν, καὶ ἀωαστάντα, καὶ ἀναληφθέντα εἰς οὐρανοὺς, καθέζεσθαι ἐν δεξιᾷ τοῦ Πατρός· καὶ πάλιν ἐρχόμενον ἐν δόξῃ κρῖναι ζῶντας καῖ νεκρούς.	We also believe that at the end of the ages in order to abolish sin he took flesh from the holy Virgin Mary and became man, suffered for our sins, rose again, and was taken into heaven, and is seated at the right hand of the Father, and he is coming again in glory to judge the living and the dead.
Πιστεύομεν καὶ εἰς τὸ ἅγιον Πνεῦμνα, ὃ καὶ Παράκλητον ὠνόμασεν ὁ Σωτὴρ ὁ Κύριος ἡμῶν, ἐπαγγειλάμενος μετὰ τὸ ἀπελθεὶν αὐτὸν, πέμχαι τοῦτο τοῖσ μαθηταῖς, ὃ καὶ ἀπέστειλε· δι' οὖ καὶ ἁγιάζει τοὺς ἐν τῇ Ἐκκλησίᾳ πιστεξυοντας, κὶ βαπτιζομένους ἐν ὀνόματι τοὺ Πατρὸς καὶ τοῦ Υἱοῦ καῖ τοῦ ἁγίου Πνεύματος.	We also believe in the Holy Spirit, whom the Saviour our Lord also called the Paraclete, when he promised that after his departure he would send him to the disciples, and he did send him; through whom he also sanctifies those in the Church who believe and who are baptized in the name of the Father and of the Son and of the Holy Spirit.
Τοὺς δὲ παρὰ ταύτην τὴν πίστιν ἄλλο τι κηρύττοντας, ἀλλοτρίους εἶναι τῆς καθολικῆς Ἐκκλησίας.	Those who preach anything else except this creed are alien to the Catholic Church. And that the creed recently put forth in the presence of our pious Emperor at Sirmium [i.e. the 'Dated' Creed] is to the same effect as this one those who have examined it know.

Hanson describes the Creed of Acacius as "a wholly characterless, insignificant creed (though it may have represented the kind of doctrine which the Emperor at that time favoured)." The bishops assembled at Seleucia did not accept this creed. Instead, since Acacius had previously argued with Cyril of Jerusalem, the bishops at Seleucia decided to examine Acacius' accusations against Cyril. Since Acacius refused to submit to this examination, the bishops deposed him on paper. The imperial officials at the council, Leonas and Lauricius, broke up the council, and Acacius went directly to Constantinople to present his case to the Emperor Constantius II. Acacius was not adversely affected, and became the Emperor's main advisor on ecclesiastical affairs. The Homoian Arians remained the most powerful group until the death of Constantius in November 361.

== The Rule of Faith of Ulfilas ==
Ulfilas was the Arian bishop of the Goths. According to Auxentius of Durostorum, he uttered the following Rule of Faith on his death-bed in Constantinople:

I believe in one God the Father, alone ingenerate and invisible, and in his only-begotten Son, our Lord and God, artificer and maker of the whole creation, who has nobody like him (similem suum) – therefore there is one God the Father of all who is also God of our God – and in one Holy Spirit, the power which illuminates and sanctifies, as Christ said after the resurrection to his apostles (quotation of Luke 24:49 and Acts I:8), and he (i.e. the Spirit) is not God nor our God, but the minister of Christ ... subordinate and obedient in all things to the Son, and the Son subordinate and obedient in all things to his God and Father ...

This Rule of Faith demonstrates one of the characteristics of Arian belief, the "drastic subordination of the Son".

== The Creed of Ulfilas ==
Auxentius of Durostorum provided a formal statement of what Ulfilas, Arian bishop of the Goths, believed:

He never hesitated to preach ... one sole true God the Father of Christ according to Christ's own teaching, knowing that this sole true God is solely ingenerate, without beginning, without end, eternal, supernal, high, exalted, the highest origin, higher than any superiority, better than any goodness, infinite, incomprehensible, invisible, immeasurable, immortal, indestructible, incommunicable, incorporeal, uncomposite, simple, immutable, undivided, unmoving, needing nothing, unapproachable, whole (inscissum), not subject to rule, uncreated, unmade, perfect, existing uniquely (in singularitate extantem), incomparably greater and better than everything. And when he was alone, not to create division or reduction of his Godhead but for the revelation (ostensionem) of his goodness and power, by his will and power alone, impassibly himself impassible, indestructibly himself indestructible, and immovably himself unmoved he created and begot, made and founded the Only-begotten God.

According to the tradition, and the authority of the divine Scriptures he (Ulfilas) never concealed that this second God and originator of everything is from the father and after the Father and because of the Father and for the glory of the Father, but he always showed that according to the holy Gospel he (Christ) is also the great God and great Lord and great Mystery and great Light ... the Lord who is the Provider and Lawgiver, Redeemer, Saviour ... the Originator, the first Judge of living and dead, who has this God and Father as his superior, because he (Ulfilas) despised and trampled upon the hateful and execrable, evil and perverse creed of the Homoousians as a devilish invention and doctrine of demons, and he himself knew and handed down to us that if the unwearying power of the only-begotten God is openly proclaimed as having easily made everything heavenly and earthly, invisible and visible, and is rightly and faithfully believed by us Christians why should the impassible power of God the Father not be credited with having made One suitable for himself?

But ... through his sermons and his writings he (Ulfilas) showed that there is a difference of deity between the Father and the Son, between the ingenerate and the only-begotten god, and that the Father is the creator of the whole creator, but the Son the creator of the whole creation, and the Father is the God of the Lord, but the Son the God of the whole of creation.

== Eudoxius' Rule of Faith ==
Eudoxius of Antioch is sometimes considered a moderate Arian of the Homoian tendency, but was at times friendly to Aëtius and Eunomius, representatives of the Eunomian tendency. According to Hanson, "he made the transition from Eunomian to Homoian Arianism."

Hanson translates a section of Eudoxius' Rule of Faith that, he states, exemplifies the Arian belief concerning a suffering God. "It was a central part of Arian theology that God suffered" This is because Arians, in common with other Christians, believed that God had become incarnate in a human body. In Arian theology, God the Father begat God the Son, and God the Son was incarnated in a human body, where he was crucified and died in order to show humans the way to overcome death. However Arians also believed that God the Father was perfect and could not suffer. Thus suffering was transposed onto the Son, who experienced suffering when incarnate in a human body. Arians believed that the incarnate Son, Jesus Christ, had no human soul, because it was God occupying a human body. This doctrine went together with the doctrine that Jesus was not "mere human," because if he were mere human his death would not lead to salvation for humanity. Thus Jesus had to be God, Word, or Logos incarnate, and not mere human; and as such it was the God within that animated the flesh, not a human soul.

He became flesh, not man, for he did not take a human soul, but he became flesh, in order that he might be called for men God for us (θεὸς ἡμῖν) by means of the flesh as by means of a veil; there were not two natures, because he was not a complete man, but he was God in the flesh instead of a soul: the whole was a single composite nature; he was pαssible by the Incarnation (οἰκονομίαν) for if only soul and body suffered he could not have saved the world. Let them answer then how this passible and mortal person could be consubstantial with God who is beyond these things: suffering and death.

== The Creed of Auxentius ==
In 364, Hilary of Poitiers tried to have Auxentius of Milan deposed for heresy. Hilary was a committed advocate of the Nicene Creed, while Auxentius was an Arian. Hilary and Eusebius of Vercelli reported Auxentius to the Emperor Valentinian I. Unlike Constantius II, Valentinian tried to remain neutral and avoid involvement in ecclesiastical affairs. The Emperor ordered an investigation of Auxentius' beliefs. In response, Auxentius wrote the following letter declaring his beliefs.

Creed of Auxentius	Hanson paraphrase
Ego quidem, piissimi Imperatores, aestimo non oportere sexcentorum episcoporum unitatem post tantos labores ex contentione paucorum hominum refriocari ab abjectis ante anos decem, sicut et scripta manifestant. Sed si aliqui ex plebe, qui numquam communicaverant, nec his qui ante me fuerunt episcopis, nunc amplius excitati ab Hilario et Eusebio, perturbantes quosdam, haereticum me vocaverunt: jussit vero pietas vestra cognoscere de his viros laudabiles, Quaestorem et Magistrum: et sicut praecixi, non eos personam habere accusatorum aut judicare qui semel depositi sunt (dico autem Hilarium et qui ei consentiunt): tamen obediens Serentiati vestrae, processi manifestare falsa dicentibus, et blasphemantibus, et vocantibus me Arianum, et quasi non confitentem Christum filium Dei Deum esse.	
Exposui amicis pietatis vestrae meam confessiionem, primum satisfaciens, quia numquam scivi Arium, non vidi oculis, non cognovi ejus docrinam: sed ex infantia, quemadmodum doctus sum, sicut accepi de sanctis Scripturis, credidi, et credo in unum solum verum Deum patrem omnipotentem, invisibilem, impassibilem, immortalem: et in filium ejus unigenitum Dominum nostrum Jesum Christum, ante omnia saecula et ante omne principium natum ex patre DEUM VERUM FILIUM ex vero Deo patre, secundum quod scriptum est in Evangelio: Haec est autem vita aeterna, ut cognoscant te solum verum Deum, et quem misisti Jesum Christum (Joan. XVII, 3). Per ipsum enim omnia facta sunt, visibilia et invisibilia. Qui descendit de coelis voluntate Patris propter nostram salutem, natus de Spiritu sancto et Maria Virgine secundum carnem, sicut scriptum est, et crucifixum sub Pontio Pilato, sepultum tertia die resurrexisse, adscendisse in coleis, sedere ad desteram Patris, venturum judicare vivos et mortuos. Et in Spiritum sanctum paracletum, quem misit Dominus et Deus noster salvator Jesus Christus discipulis, Spiritum veritatis. Sic credidi, et credo, sicuti, et adscendens in coelos unicus filius Dei tradidit discipulis, dicens: Euntes docete omnes gentes, baptizantes eos in nomine Patris et Filii et Spiritus sancti (Matth. XXVIII, 19).	He said that he had never met Arius even when he (Auxentius) was a presbyter in the Church of Alexandria under George as bishop. Hilary believed that the Milanese Arians, led by Auxentius, were ready to confess that Christ was Deum verum filium, meaning 'the true Son of God' and not 'true God the Son'. But Auxentius, who had submitted a number of documents to Valentinus designed to show that he believed as the Emperor believed, was ready to say that 'he believed that Christ is true God and of one Godhead and substance with God the Father'. He submitted a creed which was probably the traditional creed of the Church of Milan; as it was composed before the Arian Controversy it was a quite innocuous and irrelevant one.
Duos autem deos numquam praedicavi: nec enim sunt duo patres, ut duo dii dicantur, nec duo filii; sed unus filius ex uno patre, solus a solo, Deus ex Deo, sicut scriptum est: Unus Pater Deus ex quo omnia, et unus Dominus Jesus Christus per quem omnia (I Cor. VIII, 6): propter quod et unam deitatem praedicamus.	He never believed in two gods, two Fathers or two Sons, but 'one Son from one Father, Sole from the Sole, God from God ... and that is why we profess one Godhead.'
Omnes ergo haereses, quae adversus catholicam difem veniunt, semper quidem congregati espiscopi catholici condemnaverunt et anathematizaverunt, specialiter autem convenientes Arimino, et inde condemnavimus. Catholicam autem et Evangeliorum, quam tradiderunt Apostoli, hanc fideliter custodivimus. Ut autem pietas vestra verius cognosceret ea, quae gesta sunt in concilio Ariminensi, transmisi, et pet ut ea libenter legi praciiatis: sic enim cognoscet Serentiats vestra, quia qui jam dudum depositi sunt, hoc est, Hilarius et Eusebius, contendunt ubique schismata facere. Quae enim bene de sanctis Scripturis catholicae fidei exposita sunt, pietas vestra pervidet haec ratractari non oportere.	He appealed to the authority of the Councils of Ariminum and Seleucia which had produced a creed not to be abandoned at the request of a few bishops who (Auxentius alleged) had been deposed several years ago.

The letter convinced Valentinian I that Auxentius was no heretic. He dismissed the case and ordered Hilary back to Poitiers. Hilary wrote Contra Auxentium to describe the events. Hanson states that the creed of Auxentius is not representative of Homoian Arian doctrine, because Auxentius chose to defend himself by using traditional formulae passed down in the Milanese church since before the Arian controversy.

== The Creed of Germinius ==
Germinius was the bishop of Sirmium and as such was present at the Councils of Sirmium. He was present at and involved in the drafting of the Dated Creed. In 365 he produced a creed called the Symbol of Germinius of Sirmium.

Symbol of Germinius	English Translation
Ego Germinius episcopus credo et profiteor esse unum verum Deum paterm, aeternam, omnipotentem: et Christum filium ejus unicum et Dominum Deum nostrum, de vero Deo patre verum Dei filium, ante omnia genitum, divinitate, charitate, majestate, virtute, claritate, vita, sapientia, scientia Patri per omnia similem, utpote perfectum de perfecto genitum: suseceptionem etiam himinis ex virgine Maria, sicut prophetae futurum praedixerunt, et evangelicae atque apostolicae voces completum docent. Passiones quoque ejus et mortem et resurrectionem et in coelis adscensionem suscipimus, credimus, profitemur: et quod in fine mundi de coelis descensurus sit judicare vivos et mortuos, et reddere unicuique decundum opera ejus. Et in Spiritum sanctum, id est paraclitum, qui nobis a Deo patre per Filium datus est. Explicit.	I bishop of Germinius believe and confess that there is one true God the Father, eternal, almighty; and Christ his only Son and our Lord God, the true Son of God from the true God the Father, born before all things, in deity, love, majesty, power, glory, love, wisdom, knowledge, like in all things to the Father, since he is born perfect from the Perfect. His taking of manhood from he Virgin Mary, as the prophets predicted would happen, and as the texts of the gospels and apostles inform us to have been accomplished; his sufferings too and death and resurrection and ascension into heaven we accept, believe and profess; and that at the end of the world he will descend from heaven to judge the living and the dead and to reward each according to his works. And in the Holy Spirit, that is the Paraclete who was given to us from God the Father through the Son. That is all.

This profession of faith caused concern among Homoian Arian bishops because Germinius said that the Son was like the Father 'in all things' (per omnia similem). This was the Homoiousian formula proposed by Basil of Ancyra and rejected at the Council of Seleucia. Valens of Mursa, Ursacius of Singidunum, Gaius, and Paulus met in a council at Singidunum in 366. They wrote a letter to Germinius asking him to say that the Son is like the Father 'according to the Scriptures' because 'in all respects' could be taken to accept homoousianism, that is, commonality of substance, which Arians consistently rejected. In response, Germinius produced the following creed.

Creed of Germinius	Hanson paraphrase and translation<
Vitalis V.C. militantis in officio sublimis Praefecturae relatione comperimus, desiderare Sanctitatem vestram significari vobis aperte quid est, quod de fide nostra Valenti, Ursacio, Gaio et Paulo displiceat. Necessarium duxi, his litteris patefaciendum Sanctitati vestrae, et id, quod in vobis ipsis ab initio esse confido, dicere.	
Nos hoc quod et a patribus traditum acceptimus, et divinis Scripturis quod semel didicimus, et quotidie docemus, Christum Dei filium Dominum nostrum per omnia Patri similem, excepta innativitate, Deum de deo, lumen de lumine, virtutem de virtute, integrum de integro, perfectum de perfecto, ante sacecula et ante universa, quae intelligi vel dici possunt, genitum, cujus nativitatem nemo scit nisi solus Pater, impso Filio adserente: Quia nemo novit Filium Pater, neque Patrem quis novit nisi Filius, et cui voluerit Filius revelare (Matt. XI, 27): per quem facta snt omnia, sine quo factum est nihnil, secundum divinas voces ipsius Salvatoris nostri Filii dicentis: Pater meus usque modo operatur, et ego operor (Joan. V, 18); et iterum, Quaecumque enim Pater facit, haec et similiter Filius facit (Ibid., 19); et iterum, Ego et Pater unum sumus (Joan. X, 30); et iterum, qui me vidit, vidit et Patrem (Joan. XIV, 9); et iterum, quomodo Pater vitam habet in semelipso, ita dedit et Filio vitam habere in smelipso (Joan. V, 26); et iterum, Sicut Pater suscitat mortuos et vivificat, ita et Filius quos vult vivificat (Ibid., 21); et iterum, Creditis in Deum, et in me credite (Joan. XIV, 1); et iterum, Neque enim Pater judicat quemquam, ded omne judicium dedit Filio, ut omnes honorificent Filium sicut honorificant Patrem (Joan. V, 22, 23); et iterum cui Pater dixit, Faciamus hominem ad imaginem et similitudinem nostram (Gen. I, 26), nec dixit, ad imaginem tuam, vel, ad imaginem meam, ne aliquam dissimilitudinem in Filii sui divinitate demonstraret: sed propterea conjunxit, ad imaginem et similitudinem nostram, ut Filium suum sibi similem per omnia Deum manifestaret.	'We teach', he writes, 'Christ the Son of God our Lord like in all respects to the Father, ingenerateness excepted, God from God, Light from Light, Power from Power, Whole from Whole, Perfect from Perfect, generated (genitum) before the ages and before absolutely everything which can be conceived or uttered, whose generation nobody knows except the Father alone [quotation of Matt 11:27], through whom all things were made, without whom nothing was made' [quotations of Jn 5:17, 19, 21, 22, 26; 10:30; 14:1, 9, and finally Gn 1:26 ('Let us make man according to (our) image')]. Now argues Germinius, this does not say my image or your image 'to preclude the suggestion of any unlikeness in the divinity of his Son'. It must imply that he is like in all respects.
Iterum Evangelista, Vidiumus gloriam ejus, gloriam qusi unigeniti a Patre, plenum gratia et veritate. (Joan. I, XIV) Et Apostolus ad Corinthios, In quibus Deus hujus saeculi exc aecavit mentes infidelium, ut non refulgerent illuminatione Evengelii gloriae Christi, quae est imago Dei (II Cor. IV, 4). Et iterum idem Apostolus: Et transtulit nos in regno filii charitatis suae, in quo habemus redemptionem et remissionem paccatorum, qui est imago Dei invisibilis, primogenitus omnis creaturae (Coloss I, 13 et seqq.). Et iterum idem Apostolus: Hoc enim sentite in vobis, quod et in Christo Jesu, qui cum in forma Dei esset, no rapinam arbitratus est se esse aequalem Deo, sed semetipsum exinanivit formam servi accipiens, in similitudine hominum factus (Philip. II, 5 et seqq.). Quis non ingtelligat, quia quemadmodum secundum servi formam vera fuit caro nostra in Christo; ita et in Dei forma vera sit divinitas Patris in Filio? Et iterum: Videte ne quis vos seducat per philosophiam et inanem fallaciam secundum traditionem hominum, secudnum elementa hujus mundi, et non secundum Christum; quia in ipso habitat omnis pnelitudo divinitatis corporaliter (Coloss. II, 8). Si ergo omnis plenitudo divinitatis inhabitat in Christo, jam non ex part similis et ex parte dissimilis, sicut nunc asserunt, qui propter contentionem suae lbidinis retrorsum aeuntes, semetipsos a nobis averterunt.	Next he quotes Jn 11:14; 2 Cor 4:4; Col. 1:13-15 and Phil 2:5-7, and continues "Who will not see that just as our flesh was genuine in Christ according to the form of a servant, so the divinity of the Father in the Son was genuine in the form of God? [quotation of Col 2:8ff]. If therefore all the fulness of Godhead dwells in Christ, then they are not partly like and partly unlike.'
Nam quod putant se pro magno de divinis Scripturis proferre, ut dicant Christum facturam et craturma: e contrario nos secundum Scriptura dicimus scandali, et funamentum et brachium, et manum, et sapientam, et verbum, et agnum, et ovem, et pastorem, et sacerdotem, et vitem, et diem, et alia. Sed haec omnia sic intelligumus et dicumus, ut virtutes et operationes filii Dei intelligamus, non ut diinam ejus ex Patre nativitatem hujuscemodi nominibus comparemus; quia ex nihilo omnia per Filium facta sunt, Filius autem non ex nihilo, sed ex Deo patre est genitus.	The statement that Christ is something made or created refers to the Son's powers and activities only, as to many of his other titles in the Scriptures, and not to his divine birth, 'because everything was made from nothing by the Son, but the Son is not from nothing but is generated from God the Father.'
Miror autem praedictum Valentem aut oblitum esse, aut certe subdole dissimulare, quid in praeteritum gestum definitumque sit. Nam sub bonae memoriae Constantio imperatore, quando inter quosdam coepterat esse de fide dissensio, in conspectu ejusdem imperatoris, praesentibus Georgio episcopo Alexandrinorum Ecclesiae, Pancratio Palusinorum, basilio episcopo tunc Anquiritano, praesente etiam ipso Valente et Ursacio, et mea parvitate, post habitam usque in noctem de fide disputationem et ad certam regulam preductam, Marcum ab omnibus nobis electum fidem dictasse, in que fide sic conscriptum est: Filium similem Patri per omnia, ut sanctae dicunt et docent Scripturae: cujus integrae professioni consensimus omnes, et manu nostra suscripsimus. Si autem nunc aliquid apiritus hujus mundi suggerit, ex aperto adhuc scire non possumus. Nam ut nos professi sumus de Scripturis per omnia similem Filium Patri, excepta innativitate; exponant et illi de Scripturis, quemadmodum parte similis sit, parte dissimilis.	Valens, he goes on, seems to have forgotten that on one occasion in the presence of the Emperor Constantius, of George of Alexandria, Pancratius of Pelusium, Basil of Ancyra, of Valens and Ursacius themselves, and of Germinius himself, after a long discussion which lasted into the night, Mark [of Arethusa], deputed by all, drew up a formula to which all agreed, and that formula was 'the Son like the Father in all respects as the holy Scriptures say and teach'.
Et ideo, Fratres dilectissimi, haec intrepidanter et sine mora vestrae dilectionis ad conscientiam, per Cyriacum officialem, cujus prima inventa occasio est post Carinium diaconem quem ad vos misi, professionem destinavit: ut per vestram quoque vigilantissimam devotionem apud Deum universae fraternitati intimetur, ne quis fallacis diaboli laqueis ignorans implicetur. Jam vestrae est inanimitatis, rescribere mihi quid vobis sanctus Spiritus suggerat. Sane intimo Charitati Vestrae, me huic epistolae, propterea quod manus dolerem, subscribere non putuisse: subscribendum autem mandasse fratribus et compresbyteris nostris Innocentio, Octavio et Catulo.	He concludes by saying that he is sending the letter by the officialis Cyriacus, but is unable to sign it owing to pain in his hands.

According to Hanson, although Germinius was at one time a committed Homoian Arian, this creed is not Homoian Arian, but instead shows that by 366 Germinius had abandoned Homoian Arianism. Instead, this position is similar to that of the Second Creed of Antioch or Dedication Creed produced at the Council of Antioch of 341.

== Bibliography ==
- Ayres, Lewis (2004). An Approach to Fourth-Century Trinitarian Theology.
- Hanson, R. P. C. (1988). The Search for the Christian Doctrine of God. Edinburgh: T&T Clark.
- Hanson, R. P. C. (2014). "Creeds and Confessions of Faith". Encyclopedia of Ancient Christianity. Downers Grove, IL: InterVarsity Press.
- Hilary, Saint (1845). Opera Omnia. Paris: Vrayet.
- Opitz, H. G. (1934). Urkunden für Geschichte der arianischen Streites III.
- Williams, Rowan (1987). Arius: Heresy and Tradition.
