= Gregory of Elvira =

Gregory Baeticus (died c. 392) was the bishop of Elvira, in the province of Baetica, Spain.

== Life ==
Gregory is first met with as Bishop of Elvira (Illiberis) in 375; he is mentioned in the Luciferian "Libellus precum ad Imperatores" as the defender of the Nicean creed, after Bishop Hosius of Cordova had given his assent in Sirmium to the second Sirmian formulation of doctrine, in the year 357. He proved himself at any rate an ardent opponent of Arianism, stood for the Nicean creed at the Council of Rimini, and refused to enter into ecclesiastical intercourse with the Arian bishops Ursacius of Singidunum and Valens of Mursa. He took, in fact, the extreme view, in common with Bishop Lucifer of Calaris (Cagliari), that it was unlawful to make advances to bishops or priests who at any time had been associated with Arianism, or to hold any religious communion with them. This Luciferian party found adherents in Spain, and on the death of Lucifer (370 or 371) Gregory of Elvira became the head and front of the movement. Such at least is the mention found of him in the Libellus precum above referred to, as well as in St. Jerome's chronicle. However, the progress made in Spain was by no means considerable.

He is venerated in Spain as a saint, his feast being celebrated on 24 April.

== Works ==
Gregory found time also for literary labours. St. Jerome says of him that he wrote, until a very ripe old age, a diversity of treatises composed in simple and ordinary language (mediocri sermone), and produced an excellent book (elegantem librum), De Fide, which is said to be still extant The book De Trinitate seu de Fide (Rome, 1575), which was ascribed to Gregory Bæticus by Achilles Statius, its first editor, did not come from his pen, but was written in Spain at the end of the fourth century. On the other hand, early historians of literature, e.g. Quesnel, and more recently Morin, have attributed to him the treatise De Fide orthodoxa, which is directed against Arianism, and figures among the works of St. Ambrose and of Vigilius of Thapsus.

The same may be said of the first seven of the twelve books De Trinitate, the authorship of which has been ascribed to Vigilius of Thapsus. A few commentators have also sought to prove that Gregory Bæticus was the writer of the tractatus De Libris Sacarum Scripturarum, published by Pierre Batiffol (Paris, 1900) as the work of Origen. It has been impossible to ascertain the authorship in question.

There is preserved a letter to him from Eusebius of Vercelli. As St. Jerome, in his De Viris Illustribus, written in 392, does not mention Gregory as being dead, the supposition is that the latter was still living at the time. He must, however, have been then a very old man and cannot in any event have long survived the year 392.
