= Council of Seleucia =

The Council of Seleucia was an early Christian church synod at Seleucia Isauria (now Silifke, Turkey).

== History ==
In 358, the Roman Emperor Constantius II requested two councils, one of the western bishops at Ariminum and one of the eastern bishops at Nicomedia to resolve the Arian controversy over the nature of the divinity of Jesus Christ, which divided the 4th-century church.

An earthquake struck Nicomedia, killing the bishop Cecropius of Nicomedia, among others, and on 27 September 359 the eastern council (of about 160 bishops) met at Seleucia instead. The council was bitterly divided, and procedurally irregular, and the two parties met separately and reached opposing decisions. The council was nevertheless attended by a thousand or more bishops.

Basil of Ancyra, Macedonius I of Constantinople, and Patrophilus, afraid the council would depose them, had delayed their arrival; Cyril of Jerusalem and Eustathius of Sebaste also faced unresolved charges.

On the first day, Acacius of Caesarea, George of Alexandria, Uranius of Tyre, and Eudoxius of Antioch, among others, wished to resolve the charges against these bishops, and the challenges to their credentials, before voting on theological matters. George of Laodicea, Sophronius of Pompeiopolis, and Eleusius of Cyzicus, among others, wished to vote on theological matters first, and won the first procedural votes.

On the second day, George of Laodicea opened the council to Basil and the other disputed bishops from their party, ignoring the charges, and closed the council to Acacius and the opposing bishops. They reaffirmed a Creed of Antioch from 341 which declared that the Son was of similar substance to the Father.

On the following days, however, to reach broader agreement, Basil and the disputed bishops did not attend, while Acacius and the others did. Acacius proposed a new creed, with notes stating that the Son was like the Father, compromising between the controversial language of Nicaea and Antioch, and condemning Anomoeanism.

In the end, the council divided again. Basil, George of Laodicea, and their party deposed or excommunicated their opponents, including Acacius, George of Alexandria, Uranius, Theodulus of Chaeretapa, Theodosius of Philadelphia in Lydia, Evagrius of Mytilene, Leontius of Tripolis, Eudoxius of Antioch, Asterius, Eusebius, Abgarus, Basilicus, Phoebus, Fidelis, Eutychius, Magnus, and Eustathius, as well as one of those who had already faced charges, Patrophilus. Acacius and his party challenged the decisions, as did the Anomoeans.

Later that year, Constantius called for a council in Constantinople to consider the decision at Ariminum and resolve the split at Seleucia.

== Acacius' proposed creed ==
Acacius' proposed creed read, including its preface:

We having yesterday assembled by the emperor's command at Seleucia, a city of Isauria, on the 27th day of September, exerted ourselves to the utmost, with all moderation, to preserve the peace of the church, and to determine doctrinal questions on prophetic and evangelical authority, so as to sanction nothing in the ecclesiastic confession of faith at variance with the sacred Scriptures, as our Emperor Constantius most beloved of God has ordered. But inasmuch as certain individuals in the Synod have acted injuriously toward several of us, preventing some from expressing their sentiments, and excluding others from the council against their wills; and at the same time have introduced such as have been deposed, and persons who were ordained contrary to the ecclesiastical canon, so that the Synod has presented a scene of tumult and disorder, of which the most illustrious Leonas, the Comes, and the most eminent Lauricius, governor of the province, have been eye-witnesses, we are therefore under the necessity of making this declaration. That we do not repudiate the faith which was ratified at the consecration of the church at Antioch; [423] for we give it our decided preference, because it received the concurrence of our fathers who were assembled there to consider some controverted points. Since, however, the terms homoousion and homoiousion have in time past troubled the minds of many, and still continue to disquiet them; and moreover that a new term has recently been coined by some who assert the anomoion of the Son to the Father: we reject the first two, as expressions which are not found in the Scriptures; but we utterly anathematize the last, and regard such as countenance its use, as alienated from the church. We distinctly acknowledge the homoion of the Son to the Father, in accordance with what the apostle has declared concerning him, [424] "Who is the image of the invisible God."

We confess then, and believe in one God the Father Almighty, the Maker of heaven and earth, and of things visible and invisible. We believe also in his Son our Lord Jesus Christ, who was begotten of him without passion before all ages, God the Word, the only-begotten of God, the Light, the Life, the Truth, the Wisdom: through whom all things were made which are in the heavens and upon the earth, whether visible or invisible. We believe that he took flesh of the holy Virgin Mary, at the end of the ages, in order to abolish sin; that he was made man, suffered for our sin, and rose again, and was taken up into the heavens, to sit at the right hand of the Father, whence he will come again in glory to judge the living and the dead. We believe also in the Holy Spirit, whom our Lord and Saviour has denominated the Comforter, and whom he sent to his disciples after his departure, according to his promise: by whom also he sanctifies all believers in the church, who are baptized in the name of the Father, and of the Son, and of the Holy Ghost. Those who preach anything contrary to this creed, we regard as aliens from the catholic church.

== Council of Nicomedia ==
The council was originally intended to be held at the Cathedral of Nicomedia, however shortly before the council was to be held an earthquake struck that city destroying setting fire to the ruin. Killed in the earthquake were the host bishop Cecropius of Nicomedia, and another bishop from the Bosporus area. Opponents of Arianism of course held the earthquake to be divine retribution. With the venue destroyed the Emperor moved the council to Selucia, which was selected as Eudoxius objected to Tarsus and Basil objected to the royal city of Nicaea.

== See also ==
- Council of Rimini
- Council of Constantinople (360)
