= Asterius =

Asterius may refer to:

- Asterion or Asterius, multiple figures in Greek mythology
- Asterius of Ostia (died 223), Christian martyr and saint
- Asterius of Caesarea (died 262), Christian martyr and saint
- Asterius, Claudius and Neon (died 303), Christian martyr and saint
- Asterius of Petra (died 365), Bishop of Petra and saint
- Asterius of Amasea, bishop of Amasea, later in the 4th century
- Asterius (comes Hispaniarum), Roman general who defeated the Vandals in Hispania in various battles.
- Asterius of Cappadocia (died c.341), philosopher
- Turcius Rufius Apronianus Asterius, Roman consul for 494
- Asterius Chapel, underground Christian building
