= Marcus Arethusius =

Marcus Arethusius was an ancient Christian author who wrote a confession of faith, promulgated in the Third Council of Sirmium in the year 359, and was subsequently martyred under the Roman emperor Julian.

Other works describe his transgression as having torn down a pagan temple to replace it with a Christian church. Knowing this would provoke the ire of the authorities, he prepared to flee, but on learning that his family and friends were being punished in his stead, surrendered himself. He was, according to these works, beaten and stabbed and hung in the sun covered in honey for the insects to eat, until he would agree to restore the pagan temple, or to pay for its restoration. After a time, his captors grew to know he would not relent, and set him free.
