= Homoiousian =

Christian theological theory on the nature of Jesus the Son of God and God the Father

Homoiousios (Greek: ὁμοιούσιος from ὅμοιος, hómoios, "similar" and οὐσία, ousía, "essence, being") is a Christian theological term, coined in the 4th century to identify a distinct group of Christian theologians who held the belief that God the Son was of a similar, but not identical, essence (or substance) with God the Father.

== Background ==
During the period of the development of Christian doctrine and refinement of Christian theological language which ran from AD 360 to 380, the controversy between Arianism and what would eventually come to be defined as catholic orthodoxy provoked an enormous burgeoning of new movements, sects and doctrines which came into existence in the attempt to stabilize and consolidate a unique and universal position on complex and subtle theological questions. One of the central questions concerned the nature of God and the fundamental character of his relationship with his Son Jesus Christ as the preexistent Logos. This controversy was called the "trinitarian controversy" because it involved solving the riddle of how it was possible that God the Father, His Son Jesus the Word, and the Holy Spirit could be one God. The dominant position among Christian theologians at this point in history was the doctrine of homoousianism, articulated and fiercely defended by Athanasius of Alexandria, according to which Father and Son were identical in essence, divine identity, attributes and energies, and that any deviations from this orthodoxy were to be considered heretical departures from apostolic faith and worship. The Homoians, however, had a powerful ally on their side in the person of Emperor Constantius II.

== Overview ==
It is often claimed that Homoiousianism arose as an attempt to reconcile two opposing teachings, namely, Homoousianism and Homoianism:

- Homoousios is a keyword in the Nicene Creed of the year 325 and means "same substance." Homoousianism was a continuation of that concept and taught that the Son is of the same (ὁμός, homós, "same") substance as the Father. Consequently, the Son is co-equal and co-eternal with the Father.
- Homoianism, on the other hand, refused to use the term οὐσία (ousía, "essence"). Homoians believed that the Son is "like" or "similar" (ὅμοιος, hómoios) to the Father but subordinate to the Father.

It is then proposed that Homoiousian (similar substance) theology was an attempt to reconcile the Homoousian (same substance) theology with the Homoian notion of similarity.

However, Homoiousianism was “most prominently associated with … Basil of Ancyra” and "the term homoiousios plays no role in Basil's surviving texts," implying that such a compromise was not the purpose. More recently, Lewis Ayres proposed that Homoiousianism was not merely a compromise but "a significant and persistent strand in earlier eastern theology."

There are indications that this theology was a restatement or development of the theology of Eusebius of Caesarea, as stated in the letter he wrote to his home church after the Nicene Council, to explain why he accepted that Creed:

- Ritter described Homoiousianism "as the right wing of the Eusebian party.”
- “Basil … prefers the term 'image of the ousia' to define the Son's relationship to the Father; it is worth noting that this term was favoured by Eusebius of Caesarea … and also is found in the Second ('Dedication') Creed of Antloch 341.”

Eusebius was “universally acknowledged to be the most scholarly bishop of his day.”

=== A response to Neo-Arianism ===
Both Lewis Ayres and R.P.C. Hanson stated that the formulation of Homoiousian theology in 358 by a council of bishops called by Basil of Ancyra was a response to, what Ayres calls, "the emerging shape of Heterousian theology" in the form of the creed of “Sirmium 357,” which was based on the teachings of Aetius. Hanson refers to this as "Neo-Arianism" and as “a new and radical theology” that appears for the first time in the extant ancient records in the form of the “Second Creed of Sirmium of 357,” afterward approved by a larger synod at Antioch (probably in AD 358). 'Neo-Arianism' may be an appropriate name because it was “a development" of Arius' theology.

“The statement which emerged from this council … marks the emergence of a new and coherent theological point of view. This is the theology of those whom Epiphanius, quite undeservedly, calls 'Semi-Arians', but who are usually today thought of as Homoiousians, a designation which is more accurate.”

== Doctrine ==
“The statement which emerged from this council … marks the emergence of a new and coherent theological point of view. This is the theology of those whom Epiphanius, quite undeservedly, calls 'Semi-Arians', but who are usually today thought of as Homoiousians, a designation which is more accurate.”

This statement was written by Basil of Ancyra himself and “is of the highest importance for an understanding of Homoiousian theology.” It includes “nineteen anathemas which reveal more clearly the position which Basil is attacking."

=== Against Homoianism ===
Homoianism was a dominant Christology during the mid-fourth century. It refused to use ousia (substance) language in the formulation of any statement of faith. Against them, Basil insisted that substance language is necessary to reflect the closeness of the Father and Son expressed by the concepts “Father/Son” and “begotten.” He wrote:

- “God must be both Father and creator” (of His Son). “If we remove this resemblance of ousia,” the Son is merely a created being; “not a Son.”
- Since human sons are like their fathers, the Son of God is like His Father. “The salient irreducible element” in a father/son relationship is “the begetting of a living being that is like in ousia.”
- “If the Father gives the Son to have life in himself (John 5:26) … then the Son must have the same life and thus have ‘everything according to essence and absolutely as does the Father’.” (Lewis Ayres, page152)

=== Against Homoousianism ===
It is often claimed that the term homo-ousios in the Nicene Creed means "one substance," namely, that the substance of the Son is one and the same as the Father's substance. It is on this basis alone that we can argue that the Son is co-eternal and co-equal with the Father. However:

- Hanson concluded that “we can … be pretty sure that homoousios was not intended to express the numerical identity of the Father and the Son.” (p. 202)
- Philip Schaff stated: "The term homoousion ... differs from monoousion. ... and signifies not numerical identity, but equality of essence or community of nature among several beings. It is clearly used thus in the Chalcedonian symbol, where it is said that Christ is “homoousios with the Father as touching the Godhead, and homoousios with us [and yet individually distinct from us] as touching the manhood.”

The idea of "one substance," therefore, developed later. In the Homoousianism of the Nicene Creed, the Son's substance is identical with the Father's, meaning two substances that are identical.

This is based on a material interpretation of the terms “Father,” Son,” and “only-begotten,” as if God has a body and bodily gave existence to the Son, comparable to how human sons are brought forth. Consequently, the Son’s substance is identical to the Father’s. For example:

“Anathema 13 links the error of thinking of the Father/Son relationship in corporeal terms with that of making the Son identical with the Father.”

Homo-i-ousianism did not accept this notion. In Homo-i-ousianism, the Son is subordinate to the Father. If this is true, then the Son's substance cannot be identical to the Father's. Basil explained:

- “The Son is like the Father in ousia but not identical with him.”.
- “As He … was in the likeness of men (John 1:14) … yet not a man in all respects;” “not identical with human nature,” for example. He was not born through natural conception, “so the Son … is God in that he is Son of God,” was “in the form of God," and is "equal to God (Phil 2:6, 7),” “but not identical with the God and Father.”

Anathema 13 “damns him who declares ... that the Son is identical with the Father … This is manifestly directed against N (the Nicene Creed).”

=== Against Sabellianism ===
In Sabellianism, the Son is not a distinct Person. Rather, the Father and Son are parts of one Person. Basil responded:

“This argument that God must be both Father and creator and that the likeness in ousia is necessary … as a safeguard against Sabellianism: that which is like can never be the same as that to which it is like'.”

The anathemas also attack the apparent Sabellianism of Marcellus of Ancyra.

=== Against Neo-Arianism ===
In Neo-Arianism, which was “a new and radical” (RH, 348) adaptation of Arius’ theology, the terms “Father,” Son,” and “only-begotten” symbolize that the Son is the very image of the Father, but not in a corporeal (material) sense. For that reason, in this view, "the Son is 'unlike' (anhomoios) in ousia to the Father” Ayres refers to this as "Heterousian (different substance) theology." (LA, 149) For example, “Anathema 12 strikes him who declares that the Son's likeness to the Father consists in power but not in ousia.”

Homoiousianism was somewhere between the Homoousian (identical substance) view and the Neo-Arian (different substance) view.

=== Summary ===
The 55 years of Controversy after the Nicene Creed of 325 revolved specifically around the word homoousios. Since, in the Nicene Creed, this term was an interpretation of the term "begotten," the differences between the various Christological views are essentially different interpretations of the terms “Father,” "Son,” and “only-begotten.” These interpretations result in different views with respect to the substance of the Son, on the basis of which the five views may be summarized:

- Sabellianism = One and the same substance
- Homoousian = Distinct but identical substance
- Homoiousian = Similar in substance
- Neo-Arianism or heteroousians = Unlike in substance
- Homoianism refuses to refer to substance.

=== Conclusion ===
The Homoiousians took a stance between that of the Homoousians, and heteroousians (meaning 'different substance', also called Anomoeans) such as Aëtius and Eunomius. At a council in 358 at Sirmium, at the height of the movement's influence, the claim was made that the Son is "like [the Father] in all [respects]" (ὅμοιον κατὰ πάντα, hómoion katà pánta), while the use of οὐσία (ousía) or any of its compounds in theological discussion was strongly criticized but not abandoned, and the heteroousians were anathematized. This compromise solution, which was satisfying to both the Homoians and the Homoiousians, deliberately set out to alienate the more extreme Neo-Arians (heteroousians). It was successful in this intent but it remained as illegitimate in the eyes of the pro-Nicenes as ever and Basil of Ancyra declared that "that which is like can never be the same as that to which it is like".

The term "homoiousios" was also preferred by many Origenists over the term "homoousios" because they felt it left "more room for distinctions in the Godhead". Another consideration may have been the association of the latter term with Paul of Samosata and with Gnosticism's Platonic chain of being.

== The end of Homoiousianism ==
“In AD 359 Constantius decided to emulate his father's action in calling Nicaea and summon a general council. … A small group of bishops met at Sirmium to draw up a draft creed for discussion. Those present included not only Basil, but also some who were far more suspicious of ousia language. The creed on which they finally agreed … asserts that all ousia language should be avoided. … … Thus, although Basil of Ancyra was influential with the imperial authorities at one point during 358–9, it was not for long, and he never seems fully to have overcome long-standing Homoian influence at court."

Constantius was becoming somewhat hostile to the influence of all of the new movements which had sprung up after the Nicene council. The result was that the Homoiousians disappeared from the stage of history and the struggle to define Church dogma became a two-sided battle between the Homoousians and the Homoians.

Proponents of this view included Eustathius of Sebaste and George of Laodicea.

== Continued into Pro-Nicene theology ==
It is, however, not quite true to say that Homoiousianism died with Basil of Ancyra's fall from grace. Basil of Caesarea is regarded by some as "the architect of the pro-Nicene triumph" and “it has been traditional to speak of Basil as initially a Homoiousian.” “We never encounter Basil as a partisan for a distinct Homoiousian party.” However:

“In the early and mid-360s we still find Basil discussing theological topics with those whom we can broadly term ‘Homoiousian’. We may even think of Basil's major dogmatic work, the Contra Eunomium, as the logical conclusion of one strand of Homoiousian theology.”

“Around 360,” “Basil lets us know his preference for the phrase (‘invariably like according to essence’) to describe the relationship of Father and Son.” This is similar to the standard Homoiousian phrase “similar substance.” He has a “preference for Homoiousian-sounding language.”

“In Letter 361 … he does not yet articulate his mature distinction between a unitary shared nature at one level, and the personal distinctions of Father, Son, and Spirit at another. Basil still seems to view the relationship between Father and Son in a fundamentally Homoiousian way.” “It is only in the next few years that Basil will move towards the distinctions with which he is often identified.”

Furthermore, both Hilary, the "standard-bearer for the pro-Nicene cause” in the west and Athanasius defended Homoiousianism:

“In ... the De synodis, Athanasius” claims that he and the Homoiousians “fundamentally teach the same doctrine.” He “reaches out to the Homoiousians by attempting to refute their objections to Nicaea's two uses of ousia language, ‘of the Father's ousia’ and homoousios.” “Just as Athanasius saw grounds for a rapprochement between himself and the Homoiousians, Hilary saw the same.”

== Bibliography ==
- Athanasopoulos, Constantinos; Schneider, Christoph, eds. (2013). Divine Essence and Divine Energies: Ecumenical Reflections on the Presence of God. Cambridge, UK: James Clarke & Co. ISBN 9780227900086.
- Florovsky, Georges (1987). The Eastern Fathers of the Fourth Century. Vaduz: Büchervertriebsanstalt. ISBN 9783905238075.
- Weedman, Mark (2007). The Trinitarian Theology of Hilary of Poitiers. Leiden-Boston: Brill. ISBN 978-9004162242.
