= Asterius of Amasea =

Bishop of Amasea from 380 to 390 AD

Saint Asterius of Amasea

Bishop
- Born: c. 350
- Died: c. 410; Amasea, Pontus (present-day Turkey)
- Venerated in: Roman Catholic Church, Eastern Orthodox Church
- Canonized: Pre-congregation
- Feast: 30 October

Saint Asterius of Amasea (Greek: Ἀστέριος Ἀμασείας, c. 350 – c. 410 AD) was made Bishop of Amasea between 380 and 390 AD, after having been a lawyer. He was born in Cappadocia and probably died in Amasea in Pontus, now in Turkey. Significant portions of his lively sermons survive, which are especially interesting from the point of view of art history, and social life in his day. He is not to be confused with the Arian polemicist Asterius the Sophist. His feast day is October 30.

== Life and work ==
Asterius of Amasea was the younger contemporary of Amphilochius of Iconium and the three great Cappadocian Fathers. Little is known about his life, except that he was educated by a Scythian slave. Like Amphilochius, he had been a lawyer before becoming bishop between 380 and 390 AD, and he brought the skills of the professional rhetorician to his sermons. Sixteen homilies and panegyrics on the martyrs still exist, showing familiarity with the classics, and containing an unusual concentration of details of everyday life in his time. One of them, Oration 4: Adversus Kalendarum Festum attacks the pagan customs and abuses of the New Years feast, denying everything that Libanius had said supporting it – see Lord of Misrule for extensive quotations. That sermon was preached on January 1, 400 AD, which provides the main evidence, with a reference in another to his great age, to the dating of his career.

== Artistic references ==
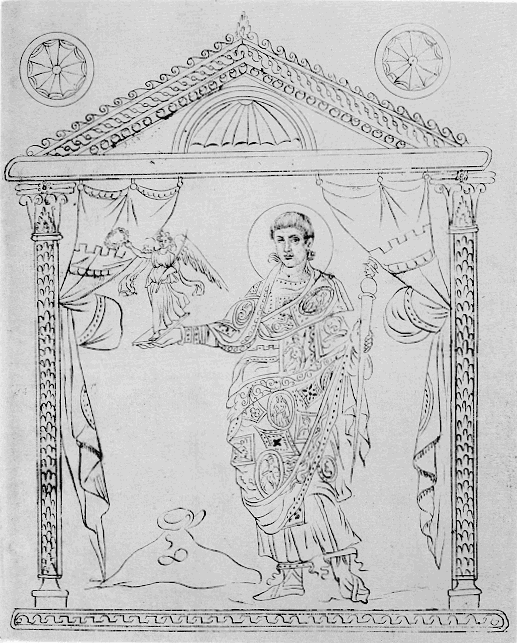
The Caesar Constantius Gallus in a later copy of the Chronography of 354, with one of the best-surviving indications of what the pictures on clothes described by Asterius looked like.

In Oration 11, On the martyrdom of St. Euphemia, Asterius describes a painting of the martyrdom and compares it to pictures made by the famous pre-Christian Hellenistic painters Euphranor and Timomachus; the speech was quoted twice in the Second Council of Nicaea in 787, which concluded the period of Byzantine iconoclasm, as evidence in favour of the veneration of images. As described, the icon was on canvas, and displayed in a church near her tomb; it has puzzled historians, as the manner of death, from fire, differs from all other accounts in the tradition. It is an exceptionally detailed ekphrasis, or description of a work of art, from this period, although scholars have wondered how well the description matched an actual work. The intended audience is uncertain, though it was apparently all-male, as they are addressed as "gentlemen" (andres). In Oration 1, On the Rich Man and Lazarus, he objects to richly decorated clothes:

through vain devices and vicious desires, you seek out fine linen, and gather the threads of the Persian worms and weave the spider's airy web; and going to the dyer, pay large prices in order that he may fish the shell-fish out of the sea and stain the garment with the blood of the creature, ----this is the act of a man surfeited, who misuses his substance, having no place to pour out the superfluity of his wealth. For this in the Gospel such a man is scourged, being portrayed as stupid and womanish, adorning himself with the embellishments of wretched girls.

Clothes decorated with religious images, worn by laymen it seems, are also condemned:

having found some idle and extravagant style of weaving, which by the twining of the warp and the woof, produces the effect of a picture, and imprints upon their robes the forms of all creatures, they artfully produce, both for themselves and for their wives and children, clothing beflowered and wrought with ten thousand objects....You may see the wedding of Galilee, and the water-pots; the paralytic carrying his bed on his shoulders; the blind man being healed with the clay; the woman with the bloody issue, taking hold of the border of the garment; the sinful woman falling at the feet of Jesus; Lazarus returning to life from the grave. In doing this they consider that they are acting piously and are clad in garments pleasing to God. But if they take my advice let them sell those clothes and honor the living image of God. Do not picture Christ on your garments. It is enough that he once suffered the humiliation of dwelling in a human body which of his own accord he assumed for our sakes. So, not upon your robes but upon your soul carry about his image.

Other interesting details of the lifestyle of the rich are mentioned in condemnation. The apparent contradiction of these positions confused Arnold Hauser, in his famous The Social History of Art, into wrongly calling Asterius was an Iconoclast, but his objection to images adorning clothes is on the grounds of expense and frivolity.

== Texts ==
Of Asterius's work, 16 homilies survive, and Photios lists four more. Some of these speeches have survived in Medieval Latin, Georgian, and Church Slavonic translations.

An English translation exists of five sermons by Asterius, collected and published in 1904 in the United States under the title Ancient Sermons for Modern Times, and issued as a reprint in 2007. This is the main portion of his works to exist in English, and has been transcribed online. Oration 11 has also been translated.

Other sermons by Asterius existed in the time of Photius, who referred to a further ten sermons not now known in Bibliotheca codex 271. One of these lost sermons indicates Asterius lived to a great age.

Philip Rubens, brother of the painter Peter Paul Rubens, produced an edition of the saint’s homilies published posthumously in a memorial volume after his death in 1611. It joins a short biography of Philip, a selection of his own Latin poems, and those written in his memory by friends.

Fourteen genuine sermons have been printed by Migne in the Patrologia Graeca 40, 155–480, with a Latin translation. along with other sermons "by Asterius" that were written by Asterius the Sophist. Another two genuine sermons were discovered in manuscript at Mount Athos by M. Bauer. Those two were first printed by A. Bretz (TU 40.1, 1914). Eleven sermons have also been translated into German.
