= Valens of Mursa =

Valens of Mursa was bishop of Mursa (Osijek in modern Croatia) and a supporter of Homoian theology, which is often labelled as a form of Arianism, although semi-Arianism is probably more accurate.

== Life ==
Valens and his fellows were seen by contemporaneous and later Church historical sources, to vacillate according to the political winds, being 'always inclined to side with the dominant party.

=== Synod of Tyre ===
He was one of a group of Bishops including Ursacius of Singidunum (Belgrade) who made accusations of impropriety against Athanasius of Alexandria resulting in the First Synod of Tyre.

Ursacius and Valens next appear in 342 at Constantinople assisting with the consecration of Macedonius as bishop of the metropolis.

In 346, Valens and Ursacius, recanted both of their previous hostility to Athanasius and to his Trinitarian theology. Accordingly, they journeyed to Rome, presenting a written recantation to its bishop, Julius, and wrote to Athanasius, expressing their willingness to hold communion with him in the future.

=== Battle of Mursa ===
During the battle of Mursa Major, while Constantius II sheltered in a tower near the battlefield, he was attended by Valens, who allegedly was able to prophesy the outcome. Thereafter, Constantius' attachment to Arianism became increasingly fanatical, under the influence of his spiritual comforter.

=== Council at Ariminum ===
Valens, Urasacius and Germinius of Sirmium were responsible for drafting the theological statement known as the Creed of Sirmium also called the Blasphemy of Sirmium in 357. In July 359 at the Council of Ariminum, some 300 to 400 bishops met. Ursacius of Singidunum and Valens soon proposed their new creed, drafted at the Fourth Council of Sirmium of 359 but not presented there. This creed holding that the Son was like the Father "according to the scriptures," and avoiding the controversial terms "same substance" and "similar substance." Others favored the creed of Nicaea.
