= Germinius of Sirmium =

Bishop of Sirmium

Germinius, born in Cyzicus, was bishop of Sirmium, (today the town Sremska Mitrovica, in the territory of Srem in Serbia) and a supporter of Homoian theology, which is often labelled as a form of Arianism.

== Background ==
Along with Valens of Mursa and Ursacius of Singidunum he was responsible for drafting the theological statement known as the Blasphemy of Sirmium in 357. He also appears in the Altercatio Heracliani laici cum Germinio episcopo Sirmiensi, which purports to be the minutes of a public disputation between Germinius and a Nicene layman called Heraclianus in January 366. He is believed to have died in 375 or 376.
