= Councils of Sirmium =

Episcopal councils

The Councils of Sirmium were the five episcopal councils held in Sirmium in 347, 351, 357, 358 and finally in 375 or 378. The third—the most important of the councils—marked a temporary compromise between Arianism and the Western bishops of the Christian church. At least two of the other councils also dealt primarily with the Arian controversy. All of these councils were held under the rule of Constantius II, who was sympathetic to the Arians.

== Background ==
Arianism was first put forward early in the 4th century by the Alexandrian presbyter Arius. It held that the Father is uniquely self-existent and immutable: consequently, Christ could not be God. The opponents of Arianism led by Athanasius of Alexandria claimed that the doctrine reduced Jesus to a demigod thus restoring polytheism as Jesus would still be worshipped. Further, it appeared to undermine the concept of redemption as only one who was truly God could reconcile man and God.

The First Council of Nicaea in 325 appeared to have settled the issue with Arius and his theology condemned and the Nicene Creed issued stating the Son was "of one substance with the father" (homoousion to Patri). However, Arians made a sustained effort to return to the church and to restore their beliefs after 325 with a prolonged theological dispute ensuing.

== First and Second Councils of Sirmium ==
Constantine the Great died in 337, leaving Constantius II, who favored Arianism, as emperor in the East and Constans, who favored Nicea, emperor in the West. A church council held at Antioch in 341 issued an affirmation of faith that excluded the homoousion clause; another council held at Serdica in 342 achieved little.

Constantius, who had a residence in Sirmium, convened the first Council of Sirmium in 347. It opposed Photinus, the bishop of Sirmium, an anti-Arian who held a belief similar to Marcellus.

In 350, Constantius became the sole Emperor of both East and West, leading to a temporary strengthening of Arianism.

At the second Council of Sirmium in 351, Basil, bishop of Ancyra (now Ankara) and leader of the semi-Arians, had Photinus deposed. The semi-Arians held that the Son was "of similar substance" (homoiousios) to the Father. Sirmium II also drafted the Sixth Arian Confession, which was an expanded version of the Fourth Arian Confession and was consistent with the strength of the semi-Arians.

== Third and Fourth Councils ==
Councils were held in Arles in 353 and Milan in 355, with Athanasius condemned at both. In 356, Athanasius began his third exile, and George was appointed bishop of Alexandria.

The third Council of Sirmium, in 357, was the high point of Arianism. The Seventh Arian Confession (Second Sirmium Confession) held that both homoousios (of one substance) and homoiousios (of similar substance) were unbiblical and that the Father is greater than the Son. (This confession was later known as the Blasphemy of Sirmium)

But since many persons are disturbed by questions concerning what is called in Latin substantia, but in Greek ousia, that is, to make it understood more exactly, as to 'coessential,' or what is called, 'like-in-essence,' there ought to be no mention of any of these at all, nor exposition of them in the Church, for this reason and for this consideration, that in divine Scripture nothing is written about them, and that they are above men's knowledge and above men's understanding;

A Council of Ancyra in 358, chaired by Basil, released a statement using the term homoousios. But the fourth Council of Sirmium, also in 358, proposed a vague compromise: it said simply that the Son was homoios ("like") the Father.

Ursacius of Singidunum and Valens of Mursa soon proposed a new creed, drafted at the Fourth Council of Sirmium in 359 but not presented there, holding that the Son was similar to the Father "according to the scriptures," and avoiding the controversial terms "same substance" and "similar substance." Others favored the creed of Nicaea.

The opponents of Sirmium wrote a letter to the emperor Constantius, praising Nicaea and condemning any reconsideration of it, before many of them left the council. The supporters of Sirmium then issued the new creed and sent it through Italy.

The council was considered a defeat for trinitarianism, and Saint Jerome wrote: "The whole world groaned, and was astonished to find itself Arian."

== Recent theory ==
T.D. Barnes suggests that the only extant reference to the "first Council of Sirmium" is in fact a wrongly-dated reference to the Council of Sirmium in 351. He then posits that the councils of 357 and 358 consisted of only a handful of participants and were not really councils. After examining the primary documents he concludes: "In sum, the only formal and well-attested Council of Sirmium during the reign of Constantius is the council of 351 which condemned Athanasius, Marcellus, and Photinus and promulgated the creed which was subsequently presented to the Councils of Arles and Milan."
