= Acacians =

Arian faction, 350s-365 CE

The Acacians (/əˈkeɪʃən/), or perhaps better described as the Homoians (from gr. hómoios) or Homoeans (/hɒˈmiːən/), were a non-Nicene branch of Christianity that dominated the church during much of the fourth-century Arian Controversy. They declared that the Son was similar to God the Father, without reference to substance (essence). Homoians played a major role in the Christianization of the Goths in the Danubian provinces of the Roman Empire.

"Though Homoian Arianism derived from the thought both of Eusebius of Caesarea and of Arius, we cannot with confidence detect it before the year 357, when it appears in the Second Sirmian Creed."

== Supporters ==
Homoian theology “was a development of the theology of Eusebius of Caesarea.”

- “Homoian Arianism derived from the thought both of Eusebius of Caesarea and of Arius.”
- "Akakius of Caesarea is usually regarded as the leader of the Homoian Arians par excellence. He succeeded Eusebius as bishop of that see in 339 or 340 and remained there for at least twenty-five years. He was clearly a devoted disciple of his predecessor." Hanson refers to Eusebius of Caesarea as “Akakius' master.”

“Eusebius of Caesarea, the historian and theologian” “attended the Council of Nicaea in 325,”” he was “universally acknowledged to be the most scholarly bishop and best-known of the 300-odd bishops present of his day,”

But when the first Homoian Creeds was formulated, Eusebius was dead and Akakius an important leader.

R.P.C. Hanson stated, "If we are to determine who among the Homoian Arians was the most influential in the long run, we must choose Ulfilas, Apostle of the Goths." “He translated most of the Bible into Gothic.”

Huneric, the ruler of the Kingdom of the Vandals and Alans in North Africa between 477 and 484 was a Homoean, as were the Suevi in western Spain, Visigoths in Spain and Gaul, Burgundians in south-west Gaul, and Ostrogoths in Italy.

== Theology ==
=== Anti-Nicene ===
Homoian theology is specifically anti-Nicene. Particularly, it opposes all ousia-language. They were “refusing to allow ousia-terms of any kind into professions of faith.” (RW, 234) For example, the Sirmian Manifesto (AD 357) said, concerning the ousia-terms:

There "ought to be no mention of any of them at all, nor any exposition of them in the Church, and for this reason and for this consideration that there is nothing written about them in divine Scripture and that they are above men's knowledge and above men's understanding." (Athan., De Syn., xxviii; Soz., ii, xxx; Hil., De Syn., xi)

=== Anti-Arius ===
Homoian theology also opposed Arius because it opposed the key aspect of Arius’ theology “that the Son was created by the Father 'out of non-existence'.” For example, the creed of the council of Ariminum anathemized those who say “that the Son is from nothing, and not from God the Father." The historian Peter Heather states that the Nicenes called the Homoeans 'Arians', but this was a ploy to associate the Homoeans with notorious arch-heretics, and there is no evidence of a direct connection.

=== The incomparability of God ===
The main pillar of Homoian doctrine is “the incomparability of God the Father.” (RH, 563) They had “a long list of texts … to demonstrate the incomparability of the Father." For example:

- Invisible - “Christ is the visible God (the Father being the invisible God)."
- Immortal - “Christ is not the immortal God (for he is mortal, that is capable of in some sense encountering death, in contrast to the Father who is immortal).”
- Ingenerate (exists without cause) - 'We confess … one God, not two gods, for we do not describe him as two ingenerates."

=== A Suffering God ===
The Homoian system was designed to avoid “the risk of saying that the Father suffered." “But they were perfectly ready to say that God the Son suffered. Indeed, their Christology was specifically designed to do so." “Here, they were on stronger ground than the pro-Nicenes, whose Christology … always wanted to avoid of concluding that the full, authentic Godhead suffered."

=== Christ as subordinate ===
“A drastic subordination of the Son to the Father had been the keynote of this school of thought."

“The Son is eternally … subordinated to the Father,” even after everything is completed that must be done for our salvation.

“It is characteristic of this type of Arianism to teach that the Father is the God of the Son.” Therefore, the Son “worships the Father."

=== Christ as divine ===
But they did refer to the Son as God. For example, they described Him as "God from God." However, "they pointed out that the word 'god' in the Bible was in several places applied to beings much inferior to God Almighty (and was therefore applicable in a reduced sense to Christ), e.g., Exod 7:1, Ps 82(81):6."

"In the intellectual climate of the fourth century, it was quite logical to maintain that the Son was God or divine while not being fully equal to the Father."

=== The Holy Spirit ===
“The status of the Spirit in Homoian teaching is emphatically short of divine.” “The Holy Spirit is created, and this certainly implies that, unlike the Son, he is not God.” The Spirit “is … not to be worshipped nor adored."

For example, “Ulfilas' doctrine exhibits a drastic subordination of the Son to the Father, a fierce emphasis upon the incomparability of the Father … a denial of the divinity of the Holy Spirit and a strong and explicit repudiation of the pro-Nicene doctrine.”

== Homoian creeds ==
As stated, Homoian theology is particularly anti-Nicene and anti-ousia-language. During the first 25 years after Nicaea in 325, nobody mentioned or used or defended the Nicene Creed or ousia language:

“For nearly twenty years after Nicaea, nobody mentions homoousios, not even Athanasius. This may be because it was much less significant than either later historians of the ancient Church or modern scholars thought that it was.” “After Nicaea homoousios is not mentioned again in truly contemporary sources for two decades. … It was not seen as that useful or important.” “What is conventionally regarded as the key-word in the Creed homoousion, falls completely out of the controversy very shortly after the Council of Nicaea and is not heard of for over twenty years.” (Hanson Lecture)

For that reason, during that period, there were also no anti-Nicene creeds or statements:

“Many of the theologies we have considered so far are non-Nicene more than anti-Nicene: only in the 350s do we begin to trace clearly the emergence of directly anti-Nicene accounts.”

The first sign of an anti-Nicene doctrine was the creed of Sirmium 351:

- “Sirmium 351 had not only omitted ousia language, but positively condemned some uses of that language.”
- “Most significant of all, perhaps, is the appearance of anathemas directly and explicitly aimed at N.” “This creed marks a definite shift towards a more sharply anti-Nicene doctrine.”

“The confession of 357 [the third Council of Sirmium] even more strongly argues against ousia language, condemning use of it,” saying, “there should be no mention of it whatever, nor should anyone preach it.” “This text demonstrates … the emergence of ‘Homoian’ theology.”

The two main Homoian Creeds are “the Second Sirmian Creed of 357” and “the Creed of Nice (Constantinople) (of 360).” “The creed of Nice-Constantinople … was temporarily registered as ecumenical in 360.”

== Biblical language ==
The Homoians were committed to use only Biblical language and declared the Son to be similar (Ancient Greek: ὅμοιος, romanized: hómoios) to God the Father, without reference to essence or substance.

- “The Arians tended … to avoid allegorising. … They tend to take Scripture literally.”
- “They prided themselves on their appeal to Scripture. … they pointed out that homoousios and ousia did not occur in the Bible. 'We do not call the Holy Spirit God … because Scripture does not call him (so)’.”
- “Truth is discovered not from argument but is proved by reliable proof-texts.”

“The Homoian Arians … were not particularly interested in philosophy:”

“The theologians of the fourth century … use the terminology of Greek philosophy. … It was never accepted by the Homoian Arians).”

Consequently, they rejected all ousia-terms, including homoousion (same in substance), homoi-ousion (similar substance), and heter-ousion (different substance).

== Dominant view ==
The Homoian view dominated during much of the Arian Controversy:

=== Eusebius of Caesarea ===
Lewis Ayres identifies “the Eusebians” as one of the four “trajectories” when the Arian Controversy began. Homoian theology, since it was a development of the Eusebians’ theology (see above), already existed when the Nicene Creed was formulated. At that time, most bishops held to the "Eusebian" view:

For example, the delegates to the Nicene Council of 325 were "drawn almost entirely from the eastern half of the empire” and the Dedication Creed of 341, which has "Origen, Eusebius of Caesarea and Asterius" as its "ancestors,” "represents the nearest approach we can make to discovering the views of the ordinary educated Eastern bishop.”

=== Rise to dominance ===
“The Homoian group came to dominance in the church in the 350s” (RH, 558–559.) “Homoian Arianism is a much more diverse phenomenon, more widespread and in fact more longlasting.”

Throughout the Arian Controversy, the church's Doctrine of God was decided by the Roman Emperors:

“If we ask the question, what was considered to constitute the ultimate authority in doctrine during the period reviewed in these pages, there can be only one answer. The will of the Emperor was the final authority.”

Similarly, Homoian theology continued to dominate under emperors Constantius and Valens:

- “Homoian Arians … had obtained power under Constantius from 360 to 361 and under Valens from 364 onwards.”
- “By 366 Valens the supporter of Homoian Arianism ruled in the East and Valentinian, the Western Emperor, was keeping as far as possible neutral in religious matters.”
- “The Emperor in the East, Valens, … was a fanatical opponent of the pro-Nicenes, as also of the Eunomians, and a supporter of the Homoian creed.”

Homoian theology continued to dominate until Theodosius became emperor and outlawed all non-Trinitarian branches of Christianity with the Edict of Thessalonica:

“When Theodosius had entered Constantinople in November 380 he had given the Homoian Demophilus the chance to remain as bishop if he subscribed to Nicaea. When he did not he was exiled.”

=== Continuation after 381 ===
Marta Szada wrote:

“Frequently, studies focusing on the fourth-century Trinitarian controversy stop at the 380s and emphasize the importance of the Council of Constantinople and the Council of Aquileia in 381, and the end of Italian rule of the last Homoian emperor, Valentinian II. In very common interpretation, these events mark the virtual end of the Latin Homoianism … In the present paper … I argue that the Latin Homoian Church survived long into the fifth century and had an active role in the process of converting the Goths into the Homoian Christianity.”

== Intermediate positions ==
R.P.C. Hanson discusses on pages 592-595 “a shift of emphasis on the part of Germinius as far as doctrine is concerned” which illuminates the disputes in Arian circles at the time. Germinius was “appointed bishop of Sirmium in 351” and regarded by some as “one of the standard-bearers of Arianism.” He wrote:

“There is one true God the Father, eternal, almighty; and Christ his only Son and our Lord God … born before all things, in deity, love, majesty, power, glory, love, wisdom, knowledge, like in all things to the Father …”

“This profession of faith caused alarm … among other Homoian Arian bishops.” “The Catholic faith declared at Ariminum" read “that the Son is like the Father according to the Scriptures.” Homoians did not want to say that “he is like 'according to substance'” or even “in all respects.” “To adopt such doctrines would be to return to the false teaching of Basil (of Ancyra) condemned at Ariminum.” (See, Homoi-ousianism) But Germinius defended his views in response to the criticism and wrote:

“Christ the Son of God our Lord like in all respects to the Father I ingenerateness excepted. God from God, Light from Light.”

Hanson concludes: “Clearly Germinius had by now abandoned Homoian Arianism.”

== Development of Homoian theology in the 350s ==
Traditionally, homoousios is regarded as the key term in the Nicene Creed. For example:

In the “centuries-old account of the Council of Nicaea: … The whole power of the mysterious dogma is at once established by the one word homoousios … with one pronouncement the Church identified a term (homoousios) that secured its … beliefs against heresy.”

But, as stated under Homoian Creeds above, during the 20–25 years after Nicaea, nobody mentions the term. However, in the 350s, Athanasius made the Nicene Creed, and the homoousios in particular, part of his polemical strategy. In this way, Athanasius brought the term back into the Controversy:

“Athanasius’ engagement with Marcellus in Rome seems to have encouraged Athanasius towards the development of” “an increasingly sophisticated account of his enemies;” “the full flowering of a polemical strategy that was to shape accounts of the fourth century for over 1,500 years;” “a masterpiece of the rhetorical art.”

“During the 350s Athanasius honed his polemic.”

“Athanasius' decision to make Nicaea and homoousios central to his theology has its origins in the shifting climate of the 350s.”

Athanasius' use of the term homoousios was being progressively accepted in the West and was used to attack the Eusebians. In response, the anti-Nicene creeds and Homoian theology developed in the late 350s. See - Homoian Arianism.

== Sirmian manifesto of 357 ==
“In the year 357 a small council met at Sirmium and produced a creed which was of great significance.” (RH, 343) Since it was formulated in the West, “the creed was originally written in Latin.” (RH, 343)

“In most older presentations, ‘western’ bishops were taken to be natural and stalwart defenders of Nicaea throughout the fourth century.” (LA, 135) It may, therefore, be surprising to find that the manifesto, issued after this Western meeting in Sirmium in 357, “is clearly Arian in its drastic, consistent and determined subordination of the Son to the Father.” (RH, 346) It said, for example:

"There is no uncertainty about the Father being greater. … This is catholic doctrine, that there are two Persons (personas) of the Father and the Son, and that the Father is greater." (RH, 344-5)

Furthermore, “it attacks N [the Nicene Creed] … directly and openly.” (RH, 347) For example, it says:

"As for the fact that some, or many, are concerned about substance (substantia) which is called, ousia in Greek, that is, to speak more explicitly, homousion, or homoeusion as it is called, there should be no mention of it whatever." (RH, 344-5)

Ossius was the chairperson of the Council of Nicaea. However, “Ossius signed it (the Sirmian manifesto).” (RH, 346)

Lewis Ayres concludes:

- “The East/West or Greek/Latin division which is often used as a primary dividing marker between varieties of fourth- and fifth-century Trinitarian theology is of far less significance than is usually thought.” (LA, 6)
- “Some writers still persist in assuming that theologies in the early fourth century can be divided between east and west, the westerners resolutely ‘beginning’ from the unity of God, easterners somehow naturally prone to a more diverse account of Father, Son, and Spirit.” Ayres describes this as “nonsensical.” (LA, 52)

== Councils of 359 and 360 ==
After a number of preliminary conferences accompanying an inevitable campaign of pamphleteering in which Hilary of Poitiers took part, the bishops of the Western portion of the Empire met at Ariminum towards the end of May, and those of the East at Seleucia Isauria in the month of September, 359. The theological complexion of both Synods was identical, at least in this, that the party of compromise, represented at Seleucia by Acacius and at Ariminum by Ursacius and Valens, was politically, though not numerically, in the ascendant and could exercise a subtle influence which depended almost as much on the argumentative ability of their leaders as on their curial prestige. In both councils, as the result of dishonest intrigue and an unscrupulous use of intimidation, the Homoian formula associated with the name of Acacius ultimately prevailed.

== Influences and decline ==
It was Acacius and his followers who had managed the whole proceeding from the outset. By coming forward as advocates of temporizing methods, they had inspired the Eusebian or Semi-Arian party with the idea of throwing over Atius and his Anomoeans. As they had proved themselves in practice all through the course of the unlooked-for movement that brought them to the front, so were they now, in theory, the exponents of the Via Media of their day.

The Acacians separated themselves from the Athanasians and Niceans, by the rejection of the word "homoousios"; from the Semi-Arians by their surrender of the "homoiousios"; and from the Aetians by their insistence upon the term homoios.

They retained their influence as a distinct party just so long as their spokesman and leader Acacius enjoyed the favour of Constantius. Under Julian the Apostate, Atius, who had been exiled as the result of the proceedings at Seleucia, was allowed to regain his influence. The Acacians seized the occasion to make common cause with his ideas, but the alliance was only political; they threw him over once more at the Synod of Antioch held under Jovian in 363.

In 365 the Semi-Arian Synod of Lampsacus condemned Acacius. His theological ideas were considered too extreme by the Semi-Arians. He was deposed from his seat, and with that event the history of the party to which he had given his name, in all practicality, ended.
