= Ursacius of Singidunum =

4th century Bishop of Singidunum

Ursacius (fl. 335–346) was the bishop of Singidunum (the ancient city which was to become Belgrade), during the middle of the 4th century. He played an important role during the evolving controversies surrounding the legacies of the Council of Nicaea and the theologian Arius, acting frequently in concert with his fellow bishops of the Diocese of Pannonia (or "Illyria"), Germinius of Sirmium and Valens of Mursa. Found at various times during their episcopal careers staking positions on both sides of the developing theological debate and internal Church politicking, Ursacius and his fellows were seen to vacillate according to the political winds.

== Early life ==
Born at the latest c. 300, little is known of Ursacius' early career, but he appears already to have become bishop of Singidunum by 335, in which capacity he formed part of the group of bishops empanelled at the Synod of Tyre to investigate the veracity of accusations of impropriety made against Athanasius of Alexandria. The endorsement by the group of the fabricated charges made against Athanasius is generally attributed to their partisanship for the theology of Arius. The association of Ursacius (and his fellow Illyrian bishops) with Arius is postulated by Wace to have begun during the period of Arius' exile in Illyria in the period immediately after the Council of Nicaea. Ursacius and Valens next appear in 342 at Constantinople assisting with the consecration of Macedonius as bishop of the metropolis.

On the restoration of Athanasius of Alexandria to his see in 346, Ursacius, along with his confederate Valens, recanted both of their previous hostility to Athanasius and to his Trinitarian theology. Accordingly, they journeyed to Rome, presenting a written recantation to its bishop, Julius, and wrote to Athanasius, expressing their willingness to hold communion with him in the future.

Found at various times during their episcopal careers staking positions on both sides of the developing theological debate and internal Church politicking, Ursacius and his fellows were seen by contemporaneous and later Church history sources (such as Socrates of Constantinople) to vacillate according to the political winds, being 'always inclined to side with the dominant party.'
