= Asterius of Cappadocia =

4th-century Christian theologian

Asterius of Cappadocia (Ἀστέριος; died c. 341) was an Arian Christian theologian from Cappadocia.

Few of his writings have been recovered in their entirety; the latest edition is by Markus Vinzent). He is said to have been a pupil of Lucian of Antioch, but it is unclear to what extent this was the case. He is said to have relapsed into paganism during the persecution under Maximian in 304 and thus, though received again into the church by Lucian and supported by the Eusebian party, never attained to ecclesiastical office. He was present at the synod of Antioch in 341.

His extant works include a Commentary on the Psalms made up of 31 sermons, a letter to Eusebius, the Syntagmation, and a few fragments. Fragments of his Syntagmation are preserved by Athanasius of Alexandria and Marcellus of Ancyra.

Asterius was a firm defender of Arianism and Eusebius of Caesarea's theology, emphasising the derivative nature of the Son as a spontaneous manifestation and generation of the Father's will.
