= Eustathius of Sebaste =

Armenian bishop (c. 300 - c. 377)

Eustathius of Sebaste (Ancient Greek: Εὐστάθιος Σεβαστιανός. c. 300 – after 377) was bishop of Sebaste in Armenia (modern Sevan, Armenia) during the fourth century (due to two historical cities being named Sebaste and the more important one in Cappadocia, modern day Turkey, historians have mistaken him for being the bishop of the wrong Sebaste). He is known for his asceticism, his early opposition to slavery, and his friendship with Basil of Caesarea.

Eustathius was son of the Arian bishop Eulalius of Sebaste and was born sometime around 300 AD. He was originally a monk, and is said to have been the first who acquainted the Armenians with an ascetic life. For this reason some persons ascribed to him the work on Ascetics, which is usually regarded as the production of Saint Basil of Caesarea. Basil was a close friend and student of Eustathius, looking up to him from a young age; Eustathius greatly influenced Basil, including inspiring him to pursue the monastic life instead of studying in Athens.

Eustathius was one of the few patristic authors to endorse the complete abolition of slavery, and possibly the first person to reject slavery entirely. Eustathius was the teacher of Macrina, Basil, Naucratius, and Gregory, who also emphasized asceticism and the rejection of slavery and social injustice. Eustathius also created charities including almshouses, hospitals, refuges, and likely inspired Basil's plan to build a hospice.

Eustathius was a controversial figure. Nicephorous states that although he had signed the decrees of the Council of Nicaea, he yet openly sided with the Arians. In 340, the Synod of Gangra condemned Eustathius and his followers for their more radical views including the complete abolition of slavery and exaggerated asceticism among other things. He also came into conflict with Meletius of Antioch over the Arian controversy, who managed to supplant him from 358 until 360. He also fell out with his former student Basil in 375 over theological differences.

The last record of Eustathius is around 377, when he was apparently a very old man.

== Bibliography ==
- Beagon, Philip M. (1995). "The Cappadocian Fathers, Women and Ecclesiastical Politics". Vigiliae Christianae. 49 (2): 165–179. doi:10.2307/1584393. ISSN 0042-6032.
- Holman, Susan R. (2004). "Rich City Burning: Social Welfare and Ecclesial Insecurity in Basil's Mission to Armenia". Journal of Early Christian Studies. 12 (2): 195–215. doi:10.1353/earl.2004.0022. S2CID 143711675.
- Ramelli, Ilaria L. E. (2016). Social Justice and the Legitimacy of Slavery: The Role of Philosophical Asceticism from Ancient Judaism to Late Antiquity. Oxford University Press. doi:10.1093/acprof:oso/9780198777274.001.0001. ISBN 978-0-19-182302-2.
