= George of Laodicea =

Alexandrian theologian of 4th century CE

Portrait by Romeyn de Hooghe, 1688

George (Greek: Γεώργιος; died 359) was the bishop of Laodicea in Syria from 335 until his deposition in 347. He took part in the Trinitarian controversies of the fourth century. Initially an ardent admirer of Arius and an associate of Eusebius of Nicomedia, he subsequently became a semi-Arian, but appears ultimately to have united with the Anomoeans—whose uncompromising opponent he had once been—and to have died professing their tenets.

George was a native of Alexandria in Roman Egypt. In early life he devoted himself with considerable distinction to the study of philosophy. He was ordained a presbyter by Bishop Alexander I of Alexandria. Having gone to Antioch, he endeavoured to mediate between Arius and the orthodox catholic church. To the Arians he showed how, by a sophistical evasion based on 1 Corinthians 11:12 (τὰ δὲ πάντα ἐκ τοῦ Θεοῦ), they might accept the orthodox test (Θεὸν ἐκ Θεοῦ). The attempt at reconciliation completely failed and resulted in his deposition and excommunication by Alexander on the grounds of false doctrine and the open, habitual irregularities of his life. Athanasius styles him "the most wicked of all the Arians", reprobated even by his own party.

After his excommunication at Alexandria, George sought admission among the clergy of Antioch but was steadily rejected by Eustathius. He then retired to Arethusa, where he acted as presbyter, and, on the expulsion of Eustathius, was welcomed back to Antioch by the dominant Arian faction. He was appointed bishop of Laodicea on the death of the Arian Theodotus. As bishop he took a leading part in the successive synods summoned by the Arian faction against Athanasius. He attended the councils of Tyre and Jerusalem in 335 and the council at Antioch that celebrated the dedication of the Domus Aurea in 341. Fear kept him from the council of Sardica in 347, where the bishops unanimously deposed him and many others as previously condemned by Alexander and as holding Arian opinions.

George paid no heed to this deposition. In 358, when Eudoxius, the newly appointed bishop of Antioch, openly sided with Aëtius and the Anomoeans, George earnestly appealed to Macedonius of Constantinople and other bishops who were visiting Basil of Ancyra to consecrate a newly erected church in Ancyra, urging them to summon a council to condemn the Anomoean heresy and eject Aëtius. His letter is preserved by Sozomen. At Seleucia Pieria in 359, when the semi-Arian party split into two, George headed the more numerous faction opposed to Acacius and Eudoxius, whom, with their adherents, they deposed. After the expulsion of Anianus from the see of Antioch, George was largely responsible for the election of Meletius, believing him to hold the same opinions as himself. He was soon undeceived, for on his first entry into Antioch Meletius startled his hearers by an unequivocal declaration of the Nicene Creed. Indignant at being thus entrapped, George and his fellows promptly secured the deposition and expulsion of a bishop of such uncompromising orthodoxy. He died in 359.

Gregory of Nyssa mentions a letter by George relating to Arius, and Socrates Scholasticus quotes a panegyric composed by him on the Arian Eusebius of Emesa, who was his intimate friend and resided with him at Laodicea after his expulsion from Emesa and by whose intervention at Antioch he was restored to his see. George also authored treatises against heresy, especially against the Manicheans. Epiphanius preserves a statement of faith he wrote jointly with Basil of Ancyra in 359.
