= Acacius of Caesarea =

4th-century Bishop of Caesarea and saint

Acacius of Caesarea (Greek: Ἀκάκιος; date of birth unknown, died in 366) was a Christian bishop probably originating from Syria; Acacius was the pupil and biographer of Eusebius and his successor on the see of Caesarea Palestina. Acacius is remembered chiefly for his bitter opposition to Cyril of Jerusalem and for the part he was afterwards enabled to play in the more acute stages of the Arian controversy. The Acacian theological movement is named after him. In the twenty-first oration of St. Gregory Nazianzen, the author speaks of Acacius as being "the tongue of the Arians".

== Rise to prominence in the Arian party ==
Throughout his life, Acacius bore the nickname of one-eyed (in Greek ό μονόφθαλμος); no doubt from a personal defect, but also possibly with a maliciously figurative reference to his alleged general shiftiness of conduct and rare skill in ambiguous statement.

In 341 Acacius had attended the council of Antioch, when in the presence of the emperor Constantius II "the Golden Basilica" was dedicated by a band of ninety bishops and he subscribed the ambiguous creeds then drawn up from which the term Homoousion and all mention of "substance" were excluded. For this with other bishops of the Eusebian party he was deposed at the council of Sardica, 343. Refusing to acquiesce in the sentence passed upon him, he withdrew with the other bishops excommunicated to Philippopolis, where he, in turn, helped to secure a sentence of excommunication and deposition against his judges, including Pope Julius and Hosius of Cordoba. These penalties which were inflicted on him at the hands of the Nicene party did not diminish his prestige. Jerome tells us that his credit with Constantius II was so great during all these years that when Pope Liberius was deposed and driven into exile in 357, Acacius was able to secure Antipope Felix in his place.

== Quarrels with Cyril of Jerusalem ==
The year 358 marked the culmination of the quarrel between Acacius and Cyril, bishop of Jerusalem. The misunderstanding, which dated back to a period not long after Cyril of Jerusalem's installation, had ostensibly arisen over a question of canonical precedence. Charges and counter-charges of heresy followed for some years, until Acacius managed to secure the deposition of Cyril, through the assistance of the Palestinian bishops, whom he had induced to examine a charge of contumacy. Cyril went into exile, but was restored to his church within two years by a decision of the Council of Seleucia. However, the credit enjoyed by Acacius with the emperor Constantius II was able to undo Cyril of Jerusalem's restoration, and, in 360, Cyril was condemned once more, this time by the Synod of Constantinople. Cyril yielded, and left his see remaining in exile until the accession of the emperor Julian, in 361.

== Synod of Seleucia ==
Acacius took a leading place among the prelates who succeeded in splitting into two the ecumenical council which Constantius II had proposed to summon, and thus nullifying its authority. While the Western bishops were assembling at Rimini, 359, he and his brethren of the East gathered at Seleucia Isauria in Syria (now Silifke, Turkey). There, Acacius led a turbulent party, called after him Acacians. After the majority had confirmed the Semi-Arian creed of Antioch ("Creed of the Dedication"), Silvanus of Tarsus proposed to confirm the Lucianic Creed, when Acacius and his party arose and left the assembly, by way of protest. In spite of this move, the Creed was signed the next morning with closed doors; a proceeding which Acacius promptly characterized as a "deed of darkness." On Wednesday, Basil of Ancyra and Macedonius I of Constantinople arrived with Hilary of Poitiers, Cyril of Jerusalem, and Eustathius. Cyril was already under censure; and Acacius refused to bring his followers back to the synod until he and some other accused bishops who were present had withdrawn. After a stormy debate his plan was agreed to and Leonas, the representative of Constantius II at the deliberation, rose and read a copy of a new Creed which Acacius had put into his hands. It rejected the terms Homoousion and Homoiousion "as alien from Scripture," and anathematizing the term "Anomoeon," and distinctly confessed the "likeness" of the Son to the Father. The semi-Arian majority rejected this formula, which interpreted the "likeness of the Son to the Father" as "likeness in will alone" (oμοιον κατα την βούλησιν μόνον), and proceeded to depose Acacius and his adherents.

== Synod of Constantinople and aftermath ==
Acacius and his followers did not wait for the sentence of deposition; instead they flew to Constantinople and laid their complaints before the emperor. Acacius soon gained the ear of Constantius II. A new council was speedily called at Constantinople, of which Acacius was the soul. Through his labours the Council was brought to accept the Confession of Rimini. To complete their triumph, he and Eudoxius of Antioch, then bishop of Constantinople, put forth their whole influence to bring the edicts of the Council of Nicaea, and all mention of the Homoousion, into disuse and oblivion. On his return to the East in 361 Acacius and his party consecrated new bishops to the vacant sees, Meletius being placed in the see of Antioch. When the imperial throne was filled by the nicene Jovian, Acacius with his friends changed their views, and in 363 they voluntarily accepted the creed of Nicaea. On the accession of the Arian Emperor Valens in 364 Acacius returned to Arianism, making common cause with Eudoxius of Antioch. But he found no favour with the council of Macedonian bishops at Lampsacus, and his deposition at Seleucia was confirmed. He died in 366 according to Baronius.

== Literary works ==
Acacius was a prelate of great learning, a patron of studies, enriching with parchments the library at Caesarea founded by Eusebius. He wrote a treatise in seventeen books on the Ecclesiastes, and also six books of Miscellanies (in Greek σύμμικτα ζητηματα) or essays on various subjects; all this and other books, like the life he wrote of Eusebius, are lost. On the other side Epiphanius of Salamis in his Panarion has preserved a considerable fragment of Acacius' Aντιλογια against Marcellus of Ancyra.

== See also ==
- Theological Library of Caesarea Maritima

Titles of the Great Christian Church
Preceded by Eusebius	Bishop of Caesarea; 340–366	Succeeded by Gelasius of Caesarea
