= Pneumatomachi =

4th century Christian sect, anti-Nicene

The Pneumatomachi (/ˌn(j)uːməˈtɒməkaɪ/; Ancient Greek: Πνευματομάχοι Pneumatomákhoi), also known as Macedonians or Semi-Arians in Constantinople and the Tropici in Alexandria, were an anti-Nicene Creed sect which flourished in the regions adjacent to the Hellespont during the latter half of the 4th, and the beginning of the 5th centuries AD. They denied the godhood of the Holy Ghost, hence the Greek name Pneumatomachi or 'Combators against the Spirit' (from πνεῦμα pneuma, spirit + μάχη machē, battle).

== History ==
Macedonius I, the founder of the Pneumatomachi, was installed into the See of Constantinople by the Arians (342 AD), and enthroned by Emperor Constantius II, who had for the second time expelled Paul, the orthodox bishop. He is known in history for his persecution of Novatians and Catholics, as both maintained the consubstantiality of Christ, the Son, with the Father. He not only expelled those who refused to hold communion with him, but also imprisoned some and brought others before the tribunals. In many cases he used torture to compel the unwilling to communicate, forced baptism on unbaptized women and children and destroyed many churches. At last, his cruelty provoked a rebellion of the Novatians at Mantinium, in Paphlagonia, in which four imperial cohorts were defeated and nearly all slain. His disinterment of the body of Emperor Constantine I was looked upon as an indignity to the Protector of the Council of Nicaea, and led to a conflict between Arians and anti-Arians, which filled the church and neighbourhood with carnage. As the disinterment had taken place without imperial sanction, Macedonius fell into disgrace, and Roman Emperor Flavius Julius Constantius caused him to be deposed by the Acacian party and succeeded by Eudoxius in 360. This deposition, however, was not for doctrinal reasons, but on the ground that he had caused much bloodshed and had admitted to communion a deacon guilty of fornication. Macedonius continued for some time to live near Constantinople and cause trouble. He died about 364.

It is thought that during these last years he formulated his rejection of the Divinity of the Holy Ghost and founded his sect. His intimacy with Eunomius of Cyzicus makes this probable. Some scholars reject the identification of Macedonians and Pneumatomachians, although that identity is asserted by Socrates, a contemporary historian living at Constantinople. The Council of Nicaea had used all its energies in defending the Homoousion of the Son and with regard to the Spirit had already added the words: "We believe in the Holy Ghost" without any qualification. Because of the vagueness and hesitancy of statement in some of the early Fathers, the Macedonians were able to justify and propagate their views. The majority of this sect were clearly orthodox on the Consubstantiality of the Son; they had sent a deputation from the Semi-Arian council of Lampsacus (364 AD) to Pope Liberius, who after some hesitation acknowledged the soundness of their faith; but with regard to the Third Person, both pope and bishops were satisfied with the phrase: "We believe in the Holy Ghost". While hiding in the desert during his third exile, Athanasius learned from his friend Serapion of Thumis of Alexandrian believers acknowledging Nicaea, and yet declaring the Holy Ghost a mere creature and a ministering angel (on the strength of Hebrews 1:14). Athanasius wrote at once to Serapion in defence of the Nicene faith, and on his return from exile (362 AD) held a council at Alexandria, which resulted in the first formal condemnation of the Pneumatomachi. A synodal letter was sent to the people of Antioch advising them to require of all converts from Arianism a condemnation against "those who say that the Holy Spirit is a creature and separate from the essence of Christ. For those who while pretending to cite the faith confessed at Nicaea, venture to blaspheme the Holy Spirit, deny Arianism in words only, while in thought they return to it." Nevertheless, during the following decade the heresy seems to have gone on without being offered almost any resistance except in the Patriarchate of Antioch where at a synod held in 363, Meletius had proclaimed the orthodox faith.

In the East, the moving spirit for the repression of the sect was Amphilochius of Iconium, who in 374 besought St. Basil of Caesarea to write a treatise on the true doctrine of the Holy Ghost. This he did, and his treatise is the classical work on the subject (peri tou hagiou II. M. 32). It is that he influenced his brother Gregory of Nyssa to write his treatise against the Macedonians, of which only a part has come down to us and which appears to be based on the words: "Lord and life-giver who proceeds from the Father." These words, apparently taken from the Creed of Jerusalem, had been used by St. Epiphanius of Salamis in his "Ancoratus" when combating the (374 AD). Amphilochius of Iconium, as Metropolitan of Lycaonia, wrote in concurrence with his bishops a synodal letter to the bishops of Lycia (another part of Asia Minor), which contains a statement of the orthodox doctrine (377 AD). In Constantinople (379) Gregory of Nazianzus pronounced his theological oration on this subject.

The West likewise upheld the Catholic teaching in a synod held in Illyria and mentioned by Theodoret (H. E., IV, 8) and by Pope Damasus in his letter to Paulinus of Antioch. The sect was condemned in the First Council of Constantinople, and internal divisions soon led to its demise. Socrates (H. E., V, 24) states that a certain Macedonian presbyter, Eutropius, held conventicles of his own while others followed Bishop Carterius. Eustathius of Sebaste, Sabinus and Eleusius of Cyzicus seem to have been leaders whom the sect repudiated (for Eustathis, see Basil, Ep., CCLXIII, 3). In June 383, Emperor Theodosius I tried by means of a conference to bring the Arian factions to submission. Eleusius handed in his symbol of faith as representing the Macedonians, as he had represented them with Marcianus of Lampsacus at the Ecumenical Council of Constantinople. After this fruitless attempt at reconciliation the Macedonians with other heretics incurred all the severities of the Theodosian code and within a generation disappeared from history. Socrates and Sozomus mention a certain Marathonius, made Bishop of Nicomedia by Macedonius, who obtained such a leading position in the sect that they were often styled after him Marathonians.

Through St. Jerome, St. Augustine, St. Damasus and Rufinus, the name Macedonians became the customary designation in the West. No writings of Macedonius are extant, but Pneumatomachian writings are mentioned by Didymus the Blind, who wrote an excellent treatise on the Holy Ghost in thirty-six chapters (translated into Latin by St. Jerome at the command of Pope Damasus), and who refers in his later work (379) on the Trinity (II, 7, 8, 10) to some "Brief Expositions" of Macedonian doctrines which he possessed.

On this subject matter Saint Gregory of Nyssa wrote the treaty entitled On the Holy Spirit against the Pneumatomachi of Macedonius. Gregory refers to God the Holy Spirit "as good and holy, princely, principal, quickening, governing, and sanctifying of all creation." This allows him to present the Spirit as a correlative of both the Father and the Son.

== Beliefs ==
The Pneumatomachi (from Greek for "spirit" and "fighters", combining as "Combators against the Spirit") are also known as the Macedonians. Church sources ascribe Bishop Macedonius I as the founder. The writings of Macedonius himself, as well as the Pneumatomachi, have all been lost, and what is asserted regarding their doctrine comes from polemic refutations by church leaders, who regarded them as a heretical sect.

Macedonius more fully developed his theological views toward the end of his life, including during a brief retirement before his death, possibly before the sect fully emerged. Pneumatomachian doctrine was embraced by Eleusius and Marathonius, the latter a major protagonist, and it gained traction in Constantinople, Thrace, Bithynia, and the Hellespont. Under the Emperor Julian, 361 to 363 AD, who personally rejected Christianity in favor of Neoplatonic paganism, and who sought to return the Roman Empire to its original religious eclecticism, the Pneumatomachi had enough power to declare their independence from both Arians and Catholics.

Pneumatomachi beliefs were distinct from, but in some regards reminiscent of, Arianism. Church commentators assert that they denied the divinity of the Holy Spirit, and regarded the substance of Jesus Christ as being of "similar substance" (homoiousios) but not of the "same essence" (homoousios) as that of God the Father. The Macedonians supported the Homoiousian creeds of Antioch and Seleucia and condemned the Homoian creeds of Ariminum and Constantinople, and they called new synods to gain support for their views and condemn their opponents.

The Pneumatomachi were denounced in 374 by Pope Damasus I. In 381 AD, the Pneumatomachian concept that the Holy Spirit was a creation of the Son, and a servant of the Father and the Son, prompted the First Council of Constantinople (also termed the Second Ecumenical Council) to add, "And in the Holy Spirit, the Lord, the Giver of Life, Who proceedeth from the Father, Who with the Father and the Son is equally worshipped and glorified, Who spake by the Prophets", into the Nicene Creed. As a result of the Second Ecumenical Council, homoousios has become the accepted definition of Nicene Orthodoxy. Thereafter, the Macedonians were suppressed by the emperor Theodosius I.

Three prominent 4th century saints Athanasius of Alexandria, Basil of Caesarea, and Basil's younger brother Gregory of Nyssa, wrote polemics against Macedonianism (titled Letters to Serapion, On the Holy Spirit, and On the Holy Spirit respectively).

== Notable Pneumatomachi ==
- Macedonius, bishop of Constantinople (342–346 and 351–360)
- Marathonius, bishop of Nicomedia (c. 351–?)
- Eleusius, bishop of Cyzicus (c. 351–360)
- Sophronius, bishop of Pompeiopolis (?–360)
- Eustathius, bishop of Sebastia
- Sabinus, bishop of Heraclea

== See also ==
- Binitarianism
- Doukhobors
- Macedonians

== Bibliography ==
- Kelly, John N. D. (2006) [1972]. Early Christian Creeds (3rd ed.). London-New York: Continuum. ISBN 9780826492166.
- Haykin, Michael, The Spirit of God: The Exegesis of 1 and 2 Corinthians in the Pneumatomachian Controversy of the Fourth Century (E.J. Brill, 1994).
- Athanasius, and C. R. B. Shapland. The Letters of Saint Athanasius Concerning the Holy Spirit. Translated by C. R. B. Shapland. London: Epworth Press, 1951. (available online here)
- Ritter, Adolf Martin (1965). Das Konzil von Konstantinopel und sein Symbol: Studien zur Geschichte und Theologie des II. Ökumenischen Konzils. Göttingen: Vandenhoeck & Ruprecht. ISBN 9783666551185.
