= Semi-Arianism =

View taken by some 4th-century Christians

Semi-Arianism was a position regarding the relationship between God the Father and the Son of God, adopted by some 4th-century Christians. Though the doctrine modified the teachings of Arianism, it still rejected the doctrine that Father, Son, and Holy Spirit are coeternal and of the same substance, or consubstantial, and was therefore considered heretical by many contemporary Christians.

Arius held that the Father, Son, and Holy Spirit were three separate essences or substances (ousia), and that the Son and Spirit derived their divinity from the Father, were created, and were inferior to the Godhead of the Father. Semi-Arians asserted that the Son was "of a similar substance" (homoiousios) as the Father but not "of the same substance" (homoousios).

== History ==
Arianism was the view of Arius and his followers, the Arians, that Jesus was subordinate to, and of a different being (ousia) from, God the Father. Arians opposed the view that the three persons of the Trinity were of one being or substance. Arianism spread throughout the Church of Alexandria and the Eastern Mediterranean. After the First Council of Nicaea condemned Arianism as heresy, many Christians adopted compromise views in which they remained in communion with Arians without adopting Arianism itself. Various formulae, such as the homoiousian and the homoean, were proposed to compromise between Arian teachings (heteroousios) and the doctrine of one substance (homoousios) asserted in the Nicene Creed.

After the 325 Council of Nicaea anathematized Arianism, the majority of the Eastern bishops—who agreed to the deposition of Athanasius of Alexandria at Tyre in 335 and received the Arians into communion at Jerusalem upon their repentance—were not Arians. The Dedication Council of Antioch in 341 put forth a creed that was unexceptionable except for its omission of the Nicene formula "of One Substance." Even disciples of Arius, such as Bishop George of Laodicea (335–47) and Eustathius of Sebaste (c. 356–80), joined the moderate party. After the death of Eusebius of Nicomedia, the leaders of the court faction—Ursacius of Singidunum, Valens of Mursa, and Germinius of Sirmium—were not tied to any formula, for Emperor Constantius II himself hated Arianism, although he disliked Athanasius even more. When Marcellus of Ancyra was deposed in 336, he was succeeded by Basil. Marcellus was reinstated by the Council of Serdica and by Bishop Julius of Rome in 343, but Basil was restored in 350 by Constantius, over whom he gained considerable influence. Basil led a council at Sirmium in 351, held against Photinus, who had been a deacon at Ancyra; the canons of this synod begin by condemning Arianism, though they do not meet the Nicene standard. Basil later had a disputation with the Anomoean Aëtius.

After the defeat of Magnentius at Mursa in 351, Valens, bishop of that city, became Constantius's spiritual director. In 355 Valens and Ursacius obtained the exile of the Western confessors Eusebius, Lucifer of Cagliari, Hilary of Poitiers, and Liberius. In 357 they issued the second Creed of Sirmium, or "formula of Hosius", in which homoousios and homoiousios were both absent. Eudoxius seized the see of Antioch and supported Aëtius and his disciple Eunomius.

The Third Council of Sirmium in 357 was the high point of Arianism. The Seventh Arian Confession (Second Sirmium Confession) held that both homoousios (of one substance) and homoiousios (of similar substance) were unbiblical and that the Father is greater than the Son. This confession was later known as the Blasphemy of Sirmium.

But since many persons are disturbed by questions concerning what is called in Latin substantia, but in Greek ousia, that is, to make it understood more exactly, as to 'coessential,' or what is called, 'like-in-essence,' there ought to be no mention of any of these at all, nor exposition of them in the Church, for this reason and for this consideration, that in divine Scripture nothing is written about them, and that they are above men's knowledge and above men's understanding;

It has also been noted that the Greek term "homoousian", which Athanasius of Alexandria favored, was reported to have been used and favored by Sabellius, and that many followers of Athanasius took issue with and were uneasy about the term. The Semi-Arians also objected to it. Their objection to "homoousian" was that it was considered un-Scriptural, suspicious, and of a Sabellian tendency. This was because Sabellius also considered the Father and the Son to be "one substance", meaning that, to Sabellius, the Father and Son were "one essential person" interacting with creation as necessary.

=== Basil of Ancyra ===
In Lent of 358, Basil, along with many bishops, was holding the dedicatory feast of a new church he had built at Ancyra when he received a letter from George of Laodicea relating how Eudoxius had approved of Aëtius and begging Macedonius of Constantinople, Basil, and the rest of the assembled bishops to decree the expulsion of Eudoxius and his followers from Antioch, lest that great see be lost. Consequently, the Synod of Ancyra published a long reply addressed to George and the other bishops of Phoenicia, in which they recited the Creed of Antioch (341), added explanations against the "unlikeness" of the Son to the Father taught by the Arians and Anomoeans (from anomoios), and showed that the very name of Father implies a Son of like substance (homoiousios, or homoios kat ousian). Anathematisms were appended in which Anomoeanism was explicitly condemned and the teaching of "likeness of substance" was enforced. The nineteenth of these canons also forbids the use of homoousios and tautoousios; this may be an afterthought prompted by the instance of Macedonius, as Basil does not seem to have insisted on it later. Legates were dispatched to the council at Sirmium; Basil, Eustathius of Sebaste, an ascetic of no dogmatic principles; Eleusius of Cyzicus, a follower of Macedonius; and the priest Leontius, one of the emperor's chaplains. They arrived just in time, for the emperor had been lending his ear to a Eudoxian, but he now veered round, issuing a letter (Sozomen, IV, xiv) declaring the Son to be "like in substance" to the Father and condemning the Arians of Antioch.

=== Epiphanius of Salamis ===
In the mid-4th century Epiphanius stated, "Semi-Arians... hold the view of the Son, that he was forever with the Father... but has been begotten without beginning and not in time... But all of these negate, or it has been said, blaspheme the Holy Spirit, and do not count him in the Godhead with the Father and the Son."

According to Sozomen, at this point Pope Liberius was released from exile upon signing three formulae combined by Basil. Basil persuaded Constantius to summon a general council, Ancyra being proposed, then Nicomedia (both in Asia Minor), but as the latter city was destroyed by an earthquake, Basil was again at Sirmium in 359, where the Arianizers had meanwhile regained their footing. With Germinius of Sirmium, George of Alexandria, Ursacius and Valens, and Bishop (later Saint) Marcus of Arethusa, he held a conference that lasted until night. A confession of faith, ridiculed under the name of the "dated creed", was drawn up by Marcus on 22 May (Hilary, "Fragment. xv"). Arianism was, of course, rejected, but the homoios kata ten ousian was not admitted, and the expression kata panta homoios, "like in all things", was substituted. Basil was disappointed and added to his signature the explanation that the words "in all things" meant not only in will but in existence and being (kata ten hyparxin kai kata to einai). Not content with this, Basil, George of Laodicea, and others published a joint explanation (Epiph., lxxiii, 12–22) that "in all things" must include "substance".

=== At Seleucia, 359 ===
The court party arranged for two councils to be held, one at Rimini (Italy) and the other at Seleucia Isauria (modern Turkey). At Seleucia in 359, the Semi-Arians were in the majority, supported by such men as St. Cyril of Jerusalem, his friend Silvanus of Tarsus, and Hilary of Poitiers, but they were unable to obtain their ends. Basil, Silvanus, and Eleusius therefore went as envoys to Constantinople, where a council was held in 360 that followed Rimini in condemning homoiousios together with homoousios and allowed homoios alone, without addition. This new phrase was the invention of Acacius of Cæsarea, who deserted the more extreme Arians and became leader of the new "Homoean" party. He procured the exile of Macedonius, Eleusius, Basil, Eustathius, Silvanus, Cyril, and others.

Constantius II died in 361. Under Julian the exiles returned. Basil was probably dead. Macedonius organized a party that confessed the Son to be kata panta homoios while declaring the Holy Ghost to be the minister and servant of the Father and a creature. Eleusius joined him, and so did Eustathius for a time. This remnant of the Semi-Arian party held synods at Zele and elsewhere. The accession of Jovian, who was orthodox, induced the versatile Acacius, with Meletius of Antioch and twenty-five bishops, to accept the Nicene formula, adding an explanation that the Nicene Fathers meant by homoousios merely homoios kat ousian—thus Acacius had taken up the original formula of the Semi-Arians. In 365 the Macedonians assembled at Lampsacus under the presidency of Eleusius and condemned the Councils of Ariminum and Antioch (360), asserting again the likeness in substance. But the threats of the Arian emperor Valens caused Eleusius to sign an Arian creed at Nicomedia in 366. He returned to his diocese full of remorse and begged for the election of another bishop, but his diocesans refused to let him resign.

The West was at peace under Valentinian I, so the Semi-Arians sent envoys to that emperor and to the pope to seek help. Pope Liberius refused to see them until they presented him with a confession of faith that included the Nicene formula. He seems to have been unaware that the party now rejected the divinity of the Holy Ghost; this, however, may not have been true of the envoys Eustathius and Silvanus. On the return of the legates, the documents they brought were received with great joy by a synod at Tyana, which embraced the Nicene faith. But another synod in Caria still refused the homoousion.

=== Council of Constantinople and after ===
In 381, the First Council of Constantinople ("First," not counting the Council of Constantinople of 360, where the Semi-Arians prevailed) was called to attempt to deal with the binitarians, who were mainly Semi-Arians at that time. However, when the Trinity was officially defined, the offended binitarians walked out.

For the rest of the history of the Semi-Arians (also called Macedonians), see Pneumatomachi.

In more modern times, Semi-Arian groups are said to include non-Trinitarian bodies such as Jehovah's Witnesses and Creation Seventh-day Adventists.

== See also ==
- Councils of Sirmium
- Arianism
- Arius
- Athanasius
- Macedonius I of Constantinople
- Eusebius of Nicomedia
- Nontrinitarianism
- Creation Seventh Day Adventist Church

== Sources ==
- Basilius of Ancyra, Eleusius, Eustathius of Sebaste by VENABLES in Diction. Christ. Biog.
- LICHTENSTEIN, Eusebius von Nikomedien (Halle, 1903)
- LOOFS, Eustathius von Sebaste und die Chronologie der Basilius-Briefe (Halle, 1898).
