= Heortasius =

Heortasius (fl. 358–361) was a 4th-century bishop of Sardis and attendee at the Councils of Seleucia and Constantinople. He was a proto-Catholic who was sent into exile by the Semi-Arian faction following their victory at the afore-mentioned Councils.

== Councils of Ariminum and Seleucia ==
In 358, the Roman Emperor Constantius II requested two councils, one of the western bishops held at Ariminum and one of the eastern bishops at Seleucia, to resolve the Arian controversy over the nature of the divinity of Jesus Christ, which divided the 4th-century church. The council at Seleucia was bitterly divided, and procedurally irregular, and the two parties met separately and reached opposing decisions. Here the Anomoean faction of the Arian bishops was led by Acacius of Caesarea, a disciple of Eusebius of Caesarea, supported by George of Alexandria and particularly Uranius of Tyre who had close ties to the Emperor.

== Council of Constantinople ==
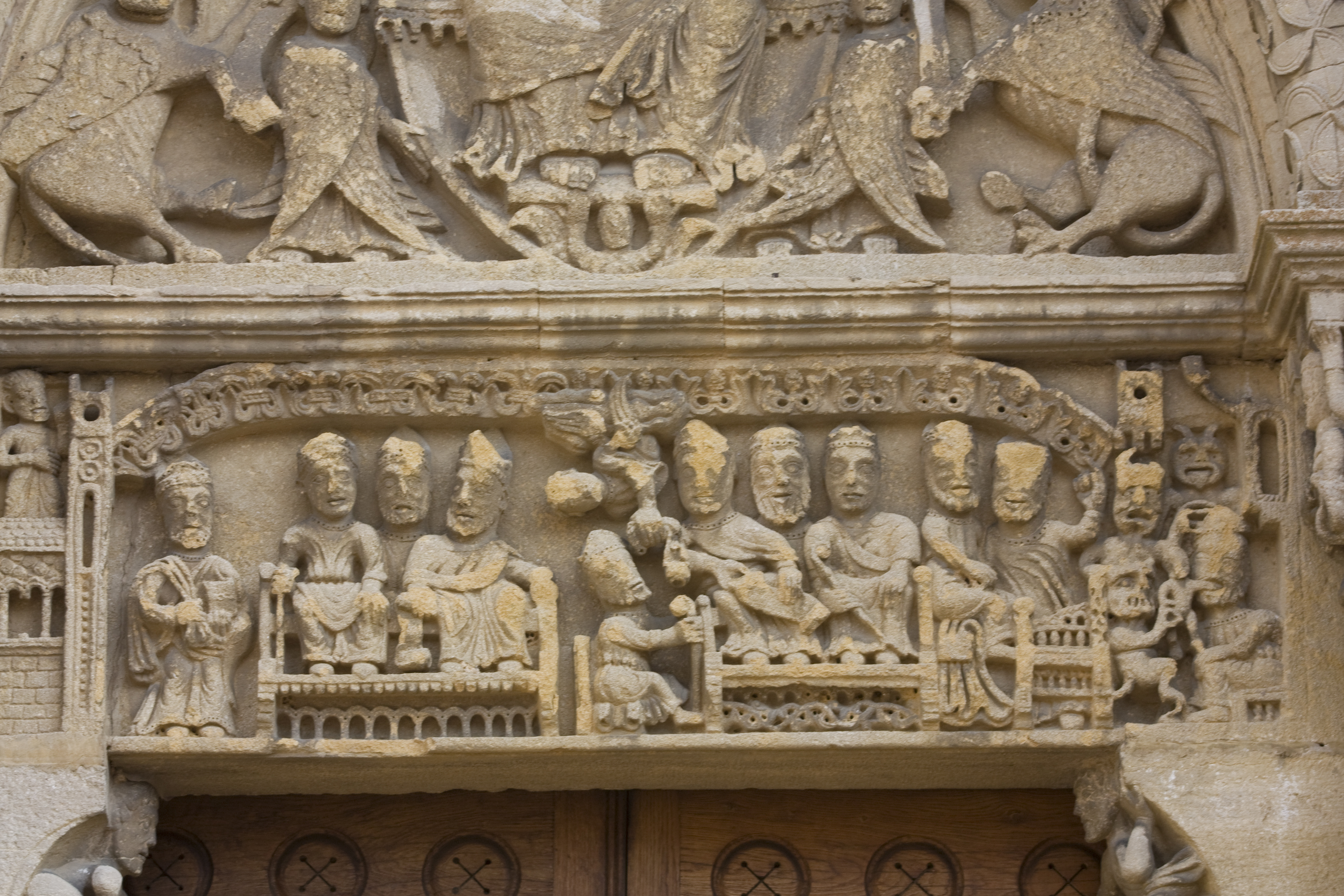
Councils of Seleucia: the frieze shows the Arians on one side and the non-Arians on the other table. Hilary of Poitiers is shown between the two groups.

Later that year, Constantius II called for a council in Constantinople to consider the decision at Ariminum and resolve the split at Seleucia. Here Constantius sided with Acacius and the semi-Arians, and several bishops of opposing factions were exiled. Heortasius was deposed (officially) because he had been ordained bishop of Sardis without the sanction of the bishops of Lydia. It seems probable however that in reality Acacius was taking the opportunity, using his imperial connections, to rid himself of long-standing enemies, especially Cyril of Jerusalem.
