= Macedonius I of Constantinople =

Fourth Century Bishop of Constantinople

- Archbishop of Constantinople
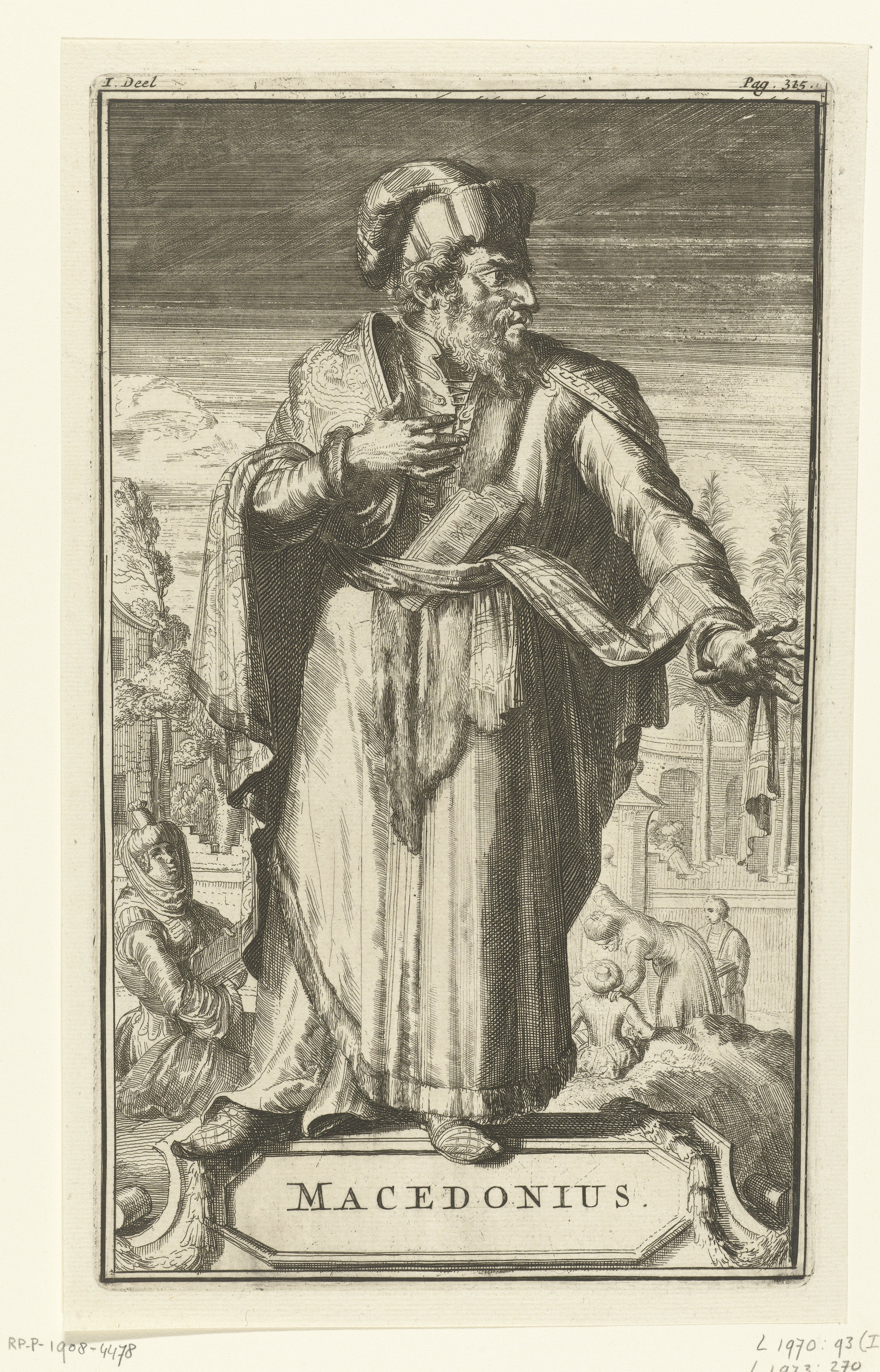
- Portrait by Romeyn de Hooghe, 1688
- Installed: 342; 351
- Term ended: 346; 360
- Predecessor: Paul I of Constantinople; Paul I of Constantinople
- Successor: Paul I of Constantinople; Eudoxius of Antioch

Personal details
- Died: 360
- Denomination: Arianism

Macedonius I of Constantinople (Greek: Μακεδόνιος; died after 360) was a Greek bishop of Constantinople from 342 up to 346, and from 351 until 360. He inspired the establishment of the Pneumatomachi (also called Macedonians), a sect later declared heretical.

== Biography ==
Following the death of Bishop Alexander of Constantinople in 336, his Nicene followers supported Paul I as his successor, while the Arians rallied behind Macedonius. Paul was ordained bishop, but his tenure was brief. In 338, the Semi-Arian Emperor Constantius II arrived in Constantinople, convened a synod of Arian bishops, and banished Paul. To Macedonius's disappointment, the emperor transferred Eusebius of Nicomedia to the vacant see.

Eusebius's death in 341 reignited hostilities between the supporters of Paul and Macedonius. Paul returned and was installed in the Church of Irene in Constantinople, while Arian bishops immediately ordained Macedonius in the Church of St. Paul. The ensuing violence prompted Constantius II to send his general Hermogenes (d. 342) to expel Paul for a second time. However, Hermogenes's soldiers met with open resistance; the general was killed, and his body was dragged through the city.

Upon hearing of the unrest, Constantius II left Antioch and punished Constantinople by halving the city's grain allowance. Paul was expelled. Although Macedonius was severely blamed for his role in the disturbances and for accepting ordination without imperial sanction, the Arians ultimately triumphed. Macedonius was permitted to serve in the church where he had been consecrated. Paul traveled to Rome, where he joined Athanasius of Alexandria and other Nicene bishops who had been expelled from their sees. Pope Julius I sent them back with letters rebuking those who had deposed them. Meanwhile, the imperial prefect Philip executed new orders to exile Paul to Thessalonica and reinstate Macedonius, a process that resulted in further bloodshed.

Macedonius held the see for approximately six years, during which the treatment of Paul and Athanasius was fiercely debated by letters, delegates, synods, and counter-synods involving both the pope and the emperors. In 349, a threat of war from Constans, the Western emperor, compelled Constantius II to reinstate Paul, forcing Macedonius to withdraw to a private church. However, the assassination of Constans in 350 left the East under Constantius's sole control, and Paul was immediately exiled once again. Subsequent imperial edicts allowed the Arians to become the dominant faction in the church.

Macedonius is said to have marked his return to power with acts of severe persecution. The Novatianists suffered perhaps even more than the Nicene Christians, prompting some to desperate resistance. In Constantinople, Novatianists dismantled and relocated their church materials to a distant suburb, while in Mantinium, Paphlagonia, they openly confronted imperial soldiers sent to expel them. According to the historian Socrates Scholasticus, "The exploits of Macedonius... on behalf of Christianity, consisted of murders, battles, incarcerations, and civil wars."

Macedonius finally lost imperial favor in 358 due to an act of presumption. The tomb containing the remains of Constantine the Great was decaying, and Macedonius determined to relocate them. The matter became highly partisan: the orthodox assailed it as a sacrilege, citing the disinterment of a supporter of the Nicene faith, while the Macedonians cited the necessity of structural repairs. When the remains were transported to the Church of Acacius of Caesarea, a violent clash erupted between the excited populace gathered in and around the church, resulting in a horrific massacre. Constantius II was incensed by the slaughter and even more so because Macedonius had moved the body without seeking imperial consent.

When Macedonius presented himself at the Council of Seleucia in 359, it was ruled that, because he was under accusation, it was improper for him to remain (Socrates, II, 40). His opponents (including Acacius of Caesarea, Eudoxius of Antioch, and others) followed him to Constantinople. Capitalizing on the emperor's indignation, they deposed him in 360 on the grounds of cruelty and canonical irregularities. Macedonius subsequently withdrew to a suburb of Constantinople, where he died.

During his retirement, he is said to have developed the theological views with which his name is associated. His followers, known as the "Macedonians," rejected the full divinity of the Holy Spirit.

== Notes and references ==
=== Attribution ===
- Fuller cites:
  - Socrates Scholasticus, H. E., II, 7, 13, 16, 38, 40;
  - Fuller advises for authorities, consult the scattered notices in Socrates, Sozomen; Hefele, Conciliengeschichte, i; the usual Church histories and HOLY GHOST in D. C. B. (4-vol. ed. 1882).

Titles of the Great Christian Church
Preceded by Paul I	Archbishop of Constantinople; 342 – 346	Succeeded by Paul I
Preceded by Paul I (2)	Archbishop of Constantinople; 351 – 360	Succeeded by Eudoxius (3)
