= Patriarch Alexander I =

Patriarch Alexander I may refer to:

- Pope Alexander I of Alexandria, ruled in 313–326 or 328
- Patriarch Alexander of Constantinople, ruled in 314–337
