= Paulus I =

Paulus I may refer to:

- Paul I of Constantinople (died ca. 350)
- Pope Paul I (700–767)
