= Council of Constantinople (360) =

Synod, 360

In 359, the Roman Emperor Constantius II requested a church council, at Constantinople, of both the eastern and western bishops, to resolve the split at the Council of Seleucia. According to Socrates Scholasticus, only about 50 of the Eastern bishops, and an unspecified number of the western ones, actually attended.

Acacius of Caesarea declared that the Son (Jesus Christ) was similar to the Father (God) "according to the scriptures," as in the majority decision at the Council of Ariminum and close to the minority at the Council of Seleucia. Basil of Ancyra, Eustathius of Sebaste, and their party declared that the Son was of similar substance to the Father, as in the majority decision at Seleucia, a position known as homoiousia. Maris of Chalcedon, Eudoxius of Antioch, and the deacons Aëtius and Eunomius declared that the Son was of a dissimilar substance from the Father, a position known as anomoeanism or heteroousia.

The Heteroousians defeated the Homoiousians in an initial debate, but Constantius banished Aëtius, after which the council, including Maris and Eudoxius, agreed to the homoian creed of Ariminum with minor modifications.

After the Council of Constantinople, the homoiousian bishop Acacius deposed and banished several bishops, including Macedonius I of Constantinople, Basil, Eustathius, Eleusius of Cyzicus, Dracontius of Pergamum, Neonas of Seleucia, Sophronius of Pompeiopolis, Elpidius of Satala and Cyril of Jerusalem.

Wulfila also attended the council and endorsed the resulting creed.

At the same time, Acacius also deposed and banished the Anomoean deacon Aëtius.

== Creed of Constantinople of 360 ==
The resulting creed read:

We believe in one God the Father Almighty, of whom are all things. And in the only-begotten Son of God, begotten of God before all ages, and before every beginning; through whom all things visible and invisible were made: who is the only-begotten born of the Father, the only of the only, God of God, similar to the Father who begat him, according to the Scriptures, and whose generation no one knows but the Father only that begat him. We know that this only-begotten Son of God, as sent of the Father, came down from the heavens, as it is written, for the destruction of sin and death: and that he was born of the Holy Spirit, and of the Virgin Mary according to the flesh, as it is written, and conversed with his disciples; and that after every dispensation had been fulfilled according to his Father's will, he was crucified and died, and was buried and descended into the lower parts of the earth, at whose presence hades itself trembled: who also arose from the dead on the third day, again conversed with his disciples, and after the completion of forty days was taken up into the heavens, and sits at the right hand of the Father, whence he will come in the last day, the day of the resurrection, in his Father's glory, to requite every one according to his works. [We believe] also in the Holy Spirit, whom he himself the only-begotten of God, Christ our Lord and God, promised to send to mankind as the Comforter, according as it is written, "the Spirit of truth;" whom he sent to them after he was received into the heavens.

But since the term ousia [substance or essence], which was used by the fathers in a very simple and intelligible sense, but not being understood by the people, has been a cause of offense, we have thought proper to reject it, as it is not contained even in the sacred writings; and that no mention of it should be made in future, inasmuch as the holy Scriptures have nowhere mentioned the substance of the Father and of the Son. Nor ought the "subsistence" of the Father, and of the Son, and of the Holy Spirit to be even named. But we affirm that the Son is similar to the Father, in such a manner as the sacred Scriptures declare and teach. Let therefore all heresies which have been already condemned, or may have arisen of late, which are opposed to this exploitation of the faith, be anathema.

The Greek text:

Πιστεύομεν εἰς ἕνα μόνον Θεὸν, Πατέρα παντοκράτορα, ἐξ οὗ τὰ πάντα·καὶ εἰς τὸν μονογενῆ Υἱὸν τοῦ Θεοῦ, πρὸ πάντων τῶν αἰώνων καὶ πρὸ πάσης ἀρχῆς γεννηθέντα ἐκ τοῦ Θεοῦ· δι' οὗ τὰ πάντα ἐγένετο, τὰ ὁρατὰ καὶ τὰ ἀόρατα· γεννηθέντα δὲ μονογενῆ, μόνον ἐκ μόνου τοῦ Πατρὸς, Θεὸν ἐκ Θεοῦ, ὅμοιον τῷ γεννήσαντι αὐτὸν Πατρὶ κατὰ τὰς γραφάς· οὗ τὴν γέννησιν οὐδεὶς γινώσκει, εἰ μὴ μόνος ὁ γεννήσας αὐτὸν Πατήρ. Τοῦτον οἴδαμεν μονογενῆ τοῦ Θεοῦ Υἱὸν, πέμποντος τοῦ Πατρὸς, παραγενέσθαι ἐκ τῶν οὐρανῶν, ὡς γέγραπται, ἐπὶ καταλύσει τῆς ἁμαρτίας καὶ τοῦ θανάτου· καὶ γεννηθέντα ἐκ Πνεύματος Ἁγίου, καὶ Μαρίας τῆς παρθένου τὸ κατὰ σάρκα, ὡς γέγραπται, καὶ ἀναστραφέντα μετὰ τῶν μαθητῶν· καὶ πάσης τῆς οἰκονομίας πληρωθείσης κατὰ τὴν πατρικὴν βούλησιν, σταυρωθέντα, καὶ ἀποθανόντα, καὶ ταφέντα, καὶ εἰς τὰ καταχθόνια κατεληλυθότα· ὅν τινα καὶ αὐτὸς ὁ ᾅδης ἔπτηξεν. Ὅς τις καὶ ἀνέστη ἀπὸ τῶν νεκρῶν τῇ τρίτῃ ἡμέρᾳ, καὶ διέτριψε μετὰ τῶν μαθητῶν· καὶ πληρωθεισῶν τῶν τεσσαράκοντα ἡμερῶν, ἀνελήφθη εἰς τοὺς οὐρανοὺς, καὶ καθέζεται ἐν δεξιᾷ τοῦ Πατρὸς, ἐλευσόμενος ἐν τῇ ἐσχάτῃ ἡμέρᾳ τῆς ἀναστάσεως ἐν τῇ πατρικῇ δόξῃ, ἵνα ἀποδώσῃ ἑκάστῳ κατὰ τὰ ἔργα αὐτοῦ. Καὶ εἰς τὸ Ἅγιον Πνεῦμα, ὅπερ αὐτὸς ὁ μονογενὴς τοῦ Θεοῦ ὁ Χριστὸς, ὁ Κύριος καὶ Θεὸς ἡμῶν, ἐπηγγείλατο πέμπειν τῷ γένει τῶν ἀνθρώπων Παράκλητον, καθάπερ γέγραπται, «τὸ Πνεῦμα τῆς ἀληθείας·» ὅπερ αὐτοῖς ἔπεμψεν, ὅτε ἀνελήφθη εἰς τοὺς οὐρανούς.

Τὸ δὲ ὄνομα τῆς «οὐσίας,» ὅπερ ἁπλούστερον ὑπὸ τῶν πατέρων ἐτέθη, ἀγνοούμενον δὲ τοῖς λαοῖς σκάνδαλον ἔφερε, διότι μηδὲ αἱ γραφαὶ τοῦτο περιέχουσιν, ἤρεσε περιαιρεθῆναι, καὶ παντελῶς μηδεμίαν μνήμην τοῦ λοιποῦ γενέσθαι, ἐπειδήπερ καὶ αἱ θεῖαι γραφαὶ οὐδαμοῦ ἐμνημόνευσαν περὶ οὐσίας Πατρὸς καὶ Υἱοῦ. Καὶ γὰρ οὐκ ὀφείλει «ὑπόστασις» περὶ Πατρὸς καὶ Υἱοῦ καὶ Ἁγίου Πνεύματος ὀνομάζεσθαι. Ὅμοιον δὲ λέγομεν τὸν Υἱὸν τῷ Πατρὶ, ὡς λέγουσιν αἱ θεῖαι γραφαὶ καὶ διδάσκουσι. Πᾶσαι δὲ αἱρέσεις, αἵ τε ἤδη πρότερον κατεκρίθησαν, καὶ αἵ τινες ἐὰν καινότεραι γένωνται, ἐναντίαι τυγχάνουσαι τῆς ἐκτεθείσης ταύτης γραφῆς, ἀνάθεμα ἔστωσαν.

== Banishments ==
Heortasius of Sardis, Dracontius of Pergamum, Silvanus of Tarsus, Sophronius of Pompeiopolis, Elpidius of Satala, Neonas of Seleucia, and Saint Cyril of Jerusalem were all exiled for their part in the Council of Seleucia the year before. Officially:

- Heortasius was deposed because he had been ordained bishop of Sardis without the sanction of the bishops of Lydia.
- Dracontius, bishop of Pergamus, because he had previously held another bishopric in Galatia, and allegedly on both occasions been unlawfully ordained.
- Silvanus because he constituted himself the leader of a foolish party in both Councils at Seleucia and Constantinople; he had, besides, constituted Theophilus as president of the church of Castabala, who had been previously ordained bishop of Eleutheropolis by the bishops of Palestine, and who had promised upon oath that he would never accept any other bishopric without their permission.
- Sophronius was deposed on account of his avarice, and on account of his having sold some of the offerings presented to the church, for his own profit; besides, after he had received a first and second summons to appear before the council, he could, at last, be scarcely induced to make his appearance, and then, instead of replying to the accusations brought against him, he appealed to other judges
- Neonas was deposed for resorting to violence to procure his bishopric and for ordaining clergy who were "ignorant of scripture"' and "preferred the enjoyment of their property to that of the priestly dignity".
- Elpidius was deposed because he supported Basil, and reinstated the presbytery named Eusebius, deposed for making a woman named Nectaria a deaconess even though she had been excommunicated.

It is probable that Acacius, using his imperial connections, was ridding himself of longstanding enemies especially Cyril of Jerusalem.
