= Archers' Guild Altarpiece =

Painting by Maerten de Vos

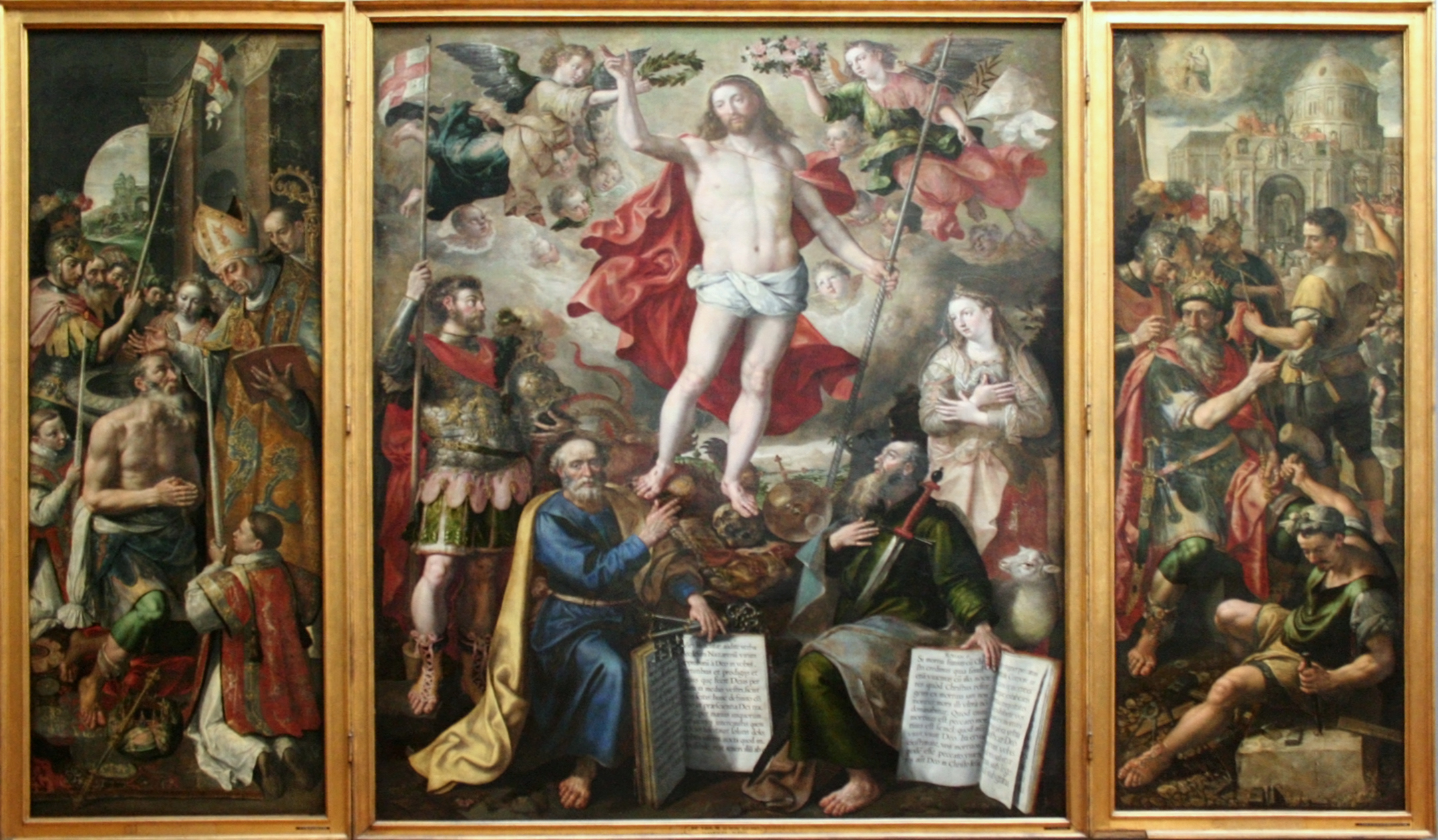

The Archers' Guild Altarpiece (Dutch - altaarstuk van de gilde van de oude voetboog) is a c.1590 painting by Maerten de Vos, now in the Royal Museum of Fine Arts Antwerp. Around 1585 Alessandro Farnese succeeded in reintroducing Catholicism to the Southern Netherlands. Partly because he was in favour of guild altars, the Oude Voetboog archers' guild in Antwerp commissioned the work from de Vos.

The central panel shows Christ Triumphant, trampling a dragon, a skull and a scorpion (symbols of sin, death and heresy respectively) and with two angels holding laurel leaves over his head. The guild's patron saint George is shown at Christ's right hand, with the princess of Silene at Christ's left hand - she also acts as a personification of Ecclesia or the Church by holding a lamb. At Christ's feet are Saint Peter and Paul the Apostle, holding Bibles open at Acts 2.17-24 and Romans 6.8-14 respectively.

The side panels show two scenes from the life of Saint George, the baptism of the king of Silene by Eusebius of Nicomedia and the king of Silene building a church in honour of Mary. The reverses of the side panels show St George and the princess of Silene returning to the city with the defeated dragon.
