= Alexander of Constantinople =

Bishop of Byzantium and the first bishop of Constantinople from 314 to 337

Saint Alexander of Constantinople
- Bishop of Byzantium / Constantinople
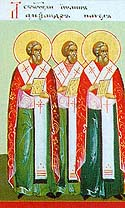
- Icon of Patriarchs Alexander, John and Paul IV
- Installed: 314
- Term ended: 337
- Predecessor: Metrophanes of Byzantium
- Successor: Paul I of Constantinople

Personal details
- Born: c. 244 Calabria, Italy
- Died: 337 (aged c. 96) Constantinople
- Denomination: Eastern Christianity

Sainthood
- Feast day: 30 August (Orthodox Church); 28 August (Catholic Church)
- Venerated in: Eastern Orthodoxy; Catholic Church

Alexander of Constantinople (Ancient Greek: Ἀλέξανδρος; c. 241 – 337) was bishop of Byzantium from 314 and the first bishop of Constantinople from 330 (the city was renamed during his episcopacy in 330). Scholars consider most of the available information on Alexander to be legendary.

== Origin and early life ==
According to the Synaxarion, Alexander was originally from Calabria in Italy and his parents were called George and Vryaine. From a very young age, he was given to God and stayed in a monastery, where he cultivated virtue and became a good labourer of God's commands. He was granted divine visions, while for twenty days he stayed completely fasting. But he also stayed naked for four years and fell into thousands of problems because of attacks of the Saracens. In this way, he lived many years traveling around Greece with his pupils Vitalius and Nicephorus.

Alexander was elected as a vicar to assist the aged bishop Metrophanes of Byzantium. According to Gelasius of Cyzicus, Metrophanes was alive during the First Council of Nicaea (325), but could not partake due to his age and ill health, so he sent instead Alexander of Constantinople, whom he destined as his successor. Metrophanes was most likely already dead by then. Alexander succeeded him at the age of 73 in 314.

During his episcopacy, Alexander engaged in debate with pagan philosophers and opposed heresies. He was highly praised by Gregory Nazianzus and Epiphanius of Salamis. Theodoret called him an "apostolic" bishop. Alexander served as bishop for about 23 years, during which time he distinguished himself by his virtues and administrative abilities.

== Arian controversy ==
When the Arian controversy began, Pope Alexander I of Alexandria, the Patriarch of Alexandria, requested his cooperation in combating what he perceived to be heresy. At the Council of Nicaea, Arius and his teachings were condemned.

Later, Arius desired to be received back into the communion of the Church. The Roman Emperor Constantine the Great, having been convinced by the Eusebians, commanded Alexander to formally receive Arius back. According to Socrates of Constantinople, Arius did not in fact repent of his heresy but was equivocating, and Bishop Alexander was aware of this. Alexander, though threatened by the Eusebians with deposition and banishment, persisted in his refusal to admit Arius back into the Church, and shut himself up in the Church of Hagia Irene (which at that time was the cathedral of Constantinople) in fervent prayer that God would take him from this world rather than be forced to restore someone to communion who he feared was only feigning repentance. As it happened, Arius died on his way to the church, before he could be received back into communion.

== Death ==
Alexander did not long survive Arius. On his deathbed he was said to have nominated his vicar, Paul I of Constantinople, as his successor, and to have warned his clergy against Macedonius I of Constantinople, who became bishop of Constantinople in 342 and whose teachings inspired Macedonianism.

After his death, Alexander came to be regarded as a saint of the Church. The service in his honor was printed in Venice in 1771. According to some ancient manuscripts, the feast of Saint Alexander was commemorated on 2 June. Today, his feast day is celebrated annually on 30 August in the Eastern Orthodox Church and 28 August in the Catholic Church, in a common commemoration with his fellow Patriarchs of Constantinople John IV of Constantinople (582–595, also commemorated on 2 September) and Paul IV of Constantinople (780–784).

== Notes and references ==
=== Attribution ===
Religious titles
Preceded by Metrophanes	Bishop of Byzantium after 10 May 330 of Constantinople; 314 – 337	Succeeded by Paul I
