= Paul I of Constantinople =

Archibishop of Constantinople from 337 to c. 350

Saint Paul I of Constantinople
- Archbishop of Constantinople
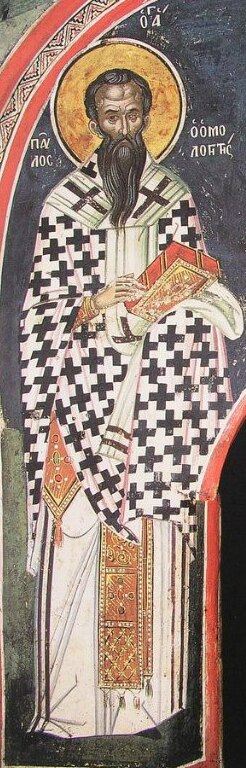
- Fresco from Dionysiou Monastery
- Church: Early Church
- Diocese: Constantinople
- Installed: 337
- Term ended: c. 350
- Predecessor: Alexander of Constantinople; Eusebius of Nicomedia; Macedonius I of Constantinople
- Successor: Eusebius of Nicomedia; Macedonius I of Constantinople

Personal details
- Born: Thessalonica
- Died: c. 350
- Denomination: Early Christianity

Sainthood
- Feast day: 6 November
- Venerated in: Catholic Church; Eastern Orthodox Church

Paul I of Constantinople or Saint Paul the Confessor (Greek: Παῦλος; died c. 350), was the sixth bishop of Constantinople, elected first in 337. Paul I became involved in the Arian controversy which drew in the Emperor of the West, Constans, and his counterpart in the East, his brother Roman emperor Constantius II. Paul I was installed and deposed three times from the See of Constantinople between 337 and 350. He was murdered by strangulation during his third and final exile in Cappadocia. His feast day is on 6 November.

== Biography ==
He was a native of Thessalonica, a presbyter of Constantinople, and secretary to the aged bishop Alexander of Constantinople, his predecessor in the see. Both the city and its inhabitants suffered much during the Arian controversies. No sooner had Alexander died than the Arian and Orthodox parties came into open conflict. The Orthodox party prevailed; in 337 Paul was elected and consecrated by bishops who happened to be at Constantinople in the Church of Peace, close to what was afterwards the Hagia Sophia.

=== First exile ===
The Roman emperor Constantius II had been away during these events. On his return, he was angry at not having been consulted. He summoned a synod of Arian bishops, declared Paul I quite unfit for the bishopric, banished him, and transported Eusebius of Nicomedia to Constantinople. This is thought to have been around 339. Paul I, seeing himself rendered useless to his flock, while Arianism reigned in the East under the protection of Constantius II, took shelter in the West, in the dominions of Constans. He went to Rome where he met Patriarch Athanasius of Alexandria, who also had been expelled from his see.

Athanasius of Alexandria was then in exile from Alexandria, Marcellus of Ancyra, and Asclepas from Gaza; with them, Paul I betook himself to Rome and consulted Pope Julius I, who examined their cases severally, found them all staunch to the creed of Nicaea, admitted them to communion, espoused their cause, and wrote strongly to the bishops of the East. Athanasius and Paul I recovered their sees; the Eastern bishops replied to Pope Julius I altogether declining to act on his advice.

=== Second exile ===
Paul I returned to Constantinople. Eusebius died in 341, and Paul I was reinstated as bishop. The Arians seized the occasion; Theognis of Nicaea, Theodorus of Heraclea, and other heterodox bishops, consecrated bishop Macedonius I of Constantinople in the church of Saint Paul; and again the city became the prey of a civil war.

The Emperor Constantius II was at Antioch when he heard of this, where he ordered Hermogenes, his general of cavalry, to see that Paul I was again expelled. The people would not hear of violence being done to their bishop; they rushed upon the house where the general was, set fire to it, killed him on the spot, tied a rope round his feet, pulled him out from the burning building, and dragged him in triumph round the city. Constantius II was not likely to pass over this rebellion against his authority. He rode on horseback at full speed to Constantinople, determined to make the people suffer heavily for their revolt. They met him, however, on their knees with tears and entreaties, and he contented himself with depriving them of half their allowance of corn but ordered Paul I to be driven from the city.

=== Third exile ===
Paul I seems to have retired to Triers, but returned to Constantinople in 344, with letters of recommendation from Constans, the emperor of the West, who wrote to Constantius II, that should Paul I not receive his patriarchal see, he would attack him. Constantius II only allowed Paul I's re-establishment for fear of his brother's arms, and Paul I's situation in the East continued very uneasy, for he had much to suffer from the power and malice of the Arian party.

Constans died in 350. Constantius II, in Antioch, ordered Philippus, prefect of the East, to once more expel Paul I and to put Macedonius I of Constantinople in his place. At a public bath called Zeuxippus, adjoining a palace by the shore of the Bosphorus, Philippus asked Paul I to meet him as if to discuss some public business. When Paul I arrived, he showed him the emperor's letter and ordered him to be quietly taken through the palace to the waterside, placed on board ship, and carried off to Thessalonica, his native town. Philippus allowed him to visit Illyricum and the remote provinces, but forbade him to set foot again in the East.

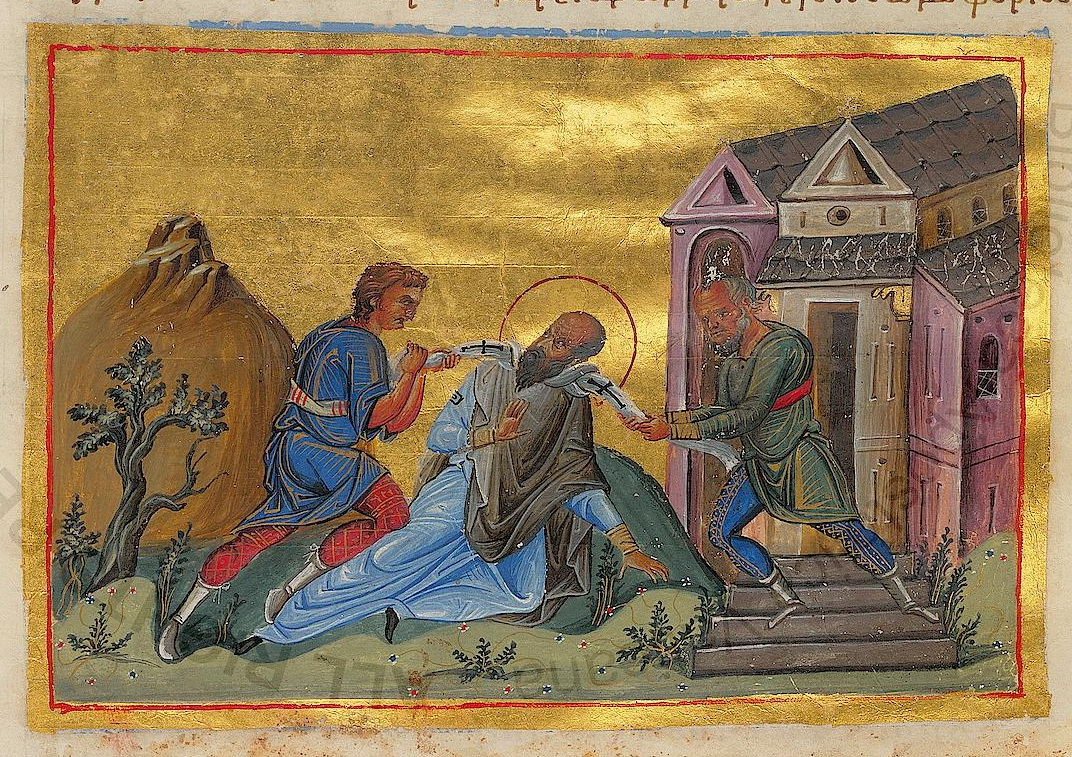
Paul I of Constantinople from Menologion of Basil II

Paul I was later loaded with chains and taken to Singara in Mesopotamia, then to Emesa, and finally to Cucusus in Cappadocia. Here he was confined in a close, dark place, and left to starve to death. After he had passed six days without food, he was, to the great disappointment of his enemies, found alive. Upon which they strangled him, and gave out that he died after a short sickness.

Paul I's body was brought to Ancyra in Galatia, and, by the order of Theodosius I, was thence translated to Constantinople in 381, about thirty years after his death. It was buried there in the great church built by Macedonius, which from that time was known by no other name than that of St. Paul. His remains were removed to Venice in 1226, where they are kept with great respect in the church of St. Laurence.

== Notes and references ==
=== Attribution ===
- sources used by Sinclair:
  - Socrates Scholasticus, H. E., ii, 6, etc.;
  - Sozomenus, H. E., iii, 3, etc.;
  - Athanasius of Alexandria, Hist. Arian. ad Monach, 275;
  - Giovanni Domenico Mansi, Concil, i, 1275.

Titles of the Great Christian Church
Preceded by Alexander	Archbishop of Constantinople; 337 – 339	Succeeded by Eusebius
Preceded by Eusebius	Archbishop of Constantinople; 341 – 342	Succeeded by Macedonius I
Preceded by Macedonius I	Archbishop of Constantinople; 346 – 350	Succeeded by Macedonius I (2)
