= Eusebian =

Eusebian may mean:

- of or relating to the Eusebian Canons
- of or relating to the historiography and historical philosophy of Eusebius
- a follower of Eusebius of Nicomedia
