= Sabinus of Heraclea =

Sabinus of Heraclea was bishop of Heraclea in Thrace, and a leader of the party and sect of Macedonius. He was the author of a collection of the Acts of the councils of the Catholic Church, from the council of Nicaea to his own time. William Cave fixes the date at which Sabinus flourished as c. 425.

The church history of Sabinus was much used by Socrates of Constantinople in his Ecclesiastical History, who speaks of it as untrustworthy, because Sabinus was partisan, and omitted, and even wilfully altered, facts and statements adverse to his views and interests. Socrates shows how Sabinus tries to disparage the fathers of Nicaea in the face of the contrary evidence of Eusebius, and makes no mention whatever of Macedonius, lest he should have to describe his deeds.

Baronius speaks strongly of Sabinus's unscrupulous handling of history, calls him "homo mendacissimus," and suggests that Sozomen gives a garbled account of the election of Athanasius, "ex officina Sabini."

== Sources ==
- s:Dictionary of Christian Biography and Literature to the End of the Sixth Century/Dictionary/S/Sabinus, bp. of Heraclea
