= Metropolis of Nicomedia =

The Metropolis of Nicomedia (Greek: Μητρόπολις Νικομηδείας) was an ecclesiastical territory (metropolis) of the Ecumenical Patriarchate of Constantinople in northwestern Asia Minor, modern Turkey. Christianity spread in Nicomedia already in the 1st century AD. Following the capture of the city by the Ottoman Turks in the early 14th century, the metropolitan see remained for a period vacant. The metropolis was re-established during the 15th century and remained active until the Greek-Turkish population exchange of 1922–1923.

== History ==
=== Early Christianity and Byzantine period ===
Christianity spread to Nicomedia during the middle of the 1st century, while the city became the oldest bishopric established in the region of Bithynia, in northwestern Asia Minor. According to Christian tradition, the first bishop was Prochorus, one of the Seven Deacons.

Nicomedia became a significant important administrative center during the reign of Emperor Diocletian. The latter aimed at transforming the city into a new capital of the Roman Empire. In 303, during the reign of the same emperor, the Christians of Nicomedia witnessed persecution, while another wave of persecution against the Christians occurred in 324 under Licinius. The number of the local Christian victims has not been estimated but it is believed that they were thousands. Among the martyrs were the legionaries Dorotheus, Gorgonius, Panteleemon and George, as well as the local bishop Anthimus. In 337 bishop Eusebius of Nicomedia baptised Emperor Constantine the Great on his deathbed.

At 451, the local bishopric was promoted to a metropolitan see under the jurisdiction of the Ecumenical Patriarchate of Constantinople. The metropolis of Nicomedia was ranked 7th in the Notitiae Episcopatuum among the metropolises of the Patriarchate.

The last attested metropolitan of the 14th century was Maximos (1324–1327). After 1327 the metropolitan see remained vacant until 1356, most likely due to the prolonged Ottoman siege of the city. Nicomedia was the last city of Bithynia that remained under Byzantine control, until it finally fell in 1337.

=== Ottoman period ===
Greek Orthodox metropolises in Asia Minor, ca. 1880.

In 1356 the metropolitan of Selymbria administered the church of Nicomedia, and in 1381-83 (and perhaps until 1385) the church was administered by the metropolitan of Ungro-Vlachia.

After the Fall of Constantinople, the Ottomans led to the incorporation of the Patriarchate of Constantinople into the Ottoman millet system and to subsequent reforms in the ecclesiastical administration. As a result, the church of Nicomedia was restored to its former status. Although at that time most metropolises in Asia Minor had ceased to exist due to the dramatic decrease of the Orthodox population, the three metropolises of Bithynia—Nicomedia, Chalcedon and Nicaea—remained active. Moreover, due to their proximity with Constantinople, the local metropolitans could regularly attend the Holy Synod in Constantinople.

From the middle of the 19th century a number of social and political developments promoted the role of the clergy: population increase and economic development of the local Orthodox communities, as well as the enhanced role of the metropolitans as representatives of the Greek Orthodox communities in the provincial administration of the Ottoman Empire, and the thriving of education, mainly through institutions controlled by the clergy.

During the Greco-Turkish War of 1919–1922, the area of the metropolis was temporarily controlled by the Greek Army. However, due to developments of the war the Greek Army retreated and the surviving local population evacuated the area. Today there is allegedly no Orthodox population in the area despite its proximity to Turkey's densest population area.

Since 2008 titular metropolitan of Nicomedia, appointed by the Ecumenical Patriarchate, is Ioakeim Nerantzoulis(+died 2023) .

== Geography and demographics ==
The population that resided in the area of the metropolis of Nicomedia was relatively small, in comparison to that of the other ecclesiastical areas in Asia Minor because of its limited geographical extent. From the first centuries of the Ottoman period the local metropolis comprised two geographically discontinuous districts, that of Nicomedia and of Apollonias. The exact limits of the area of the metropolis can be accurately drawn only from the late Ottoman period (from late 19th). The metropolitan district of Nicomedia, apart from the city itself, also included its immediate hinterland as well as the kazas of Adapazarı, Yalova, Karamürsel and Kandıra. On the other hand, the district of Apollonias, incorporated the kaza of Mihaliç, part of the kaza of Mudanya, but not the city itself and the island Kalolimnos (modern İmralı), at the Sea of Marmara.

Until 1922-23 the area of the metropolis consisted of 35 ecclesiastical communities, while according to early 20th century estimates the population numbered 43,950 Greek Orthodox people.

== Sources ==
- Γιούργαλη, Χ. "Νικομηδείας Μητρόπολις (Βυζάντιο)" (in Greek). Εγκυκλοπαίδεια Μείζονος Ελληνισμού, Μ. Ασία.
- Kiminas, Demetrius (2009). The Ecumenical Patriarchate. Wildside Press LLC. pp. 79–80. ISBN 9781434458766.
- Terezakis, Yorgos. "Diocese of Nicomedia (Ottoman Period)". Εγκυκλοπαίδεια Μείζονος Ελληνισμού, Μ. Ασία.
