= Eudoxius of Antioch =

Archbishop of Constantinople from 360 to 370

- Archbishop of Constantinople
- Installed: 27 January 360
- Term ended: Early 370
- Predecessor: Macedonius I of Constantinople
- Successor: Demophilus of Constantinople

Personal details
- Died: 370
- Denomination: Arian Christianity

Eudoxius of Antioch (Greek: Εὐδόξιος; died 370) was the fifth archibishop of Constantinople from 27 January 360 to early 370, previously bishop of Germanicia and of Antioch. Eudoxius was one of the most influential Arians.

== Biography ==
Eudoxius was from Arabissos of Asia Minor. Eudoxius came to Eustathius, bishop of Antioch between 324 and 331, seeking holy orders. However, Eustathius found his doctrine unsound and refused him. Nevertheless, when Eustathius was deposed, the Arians or Eusebius of Nicomedia had everything their own way and admitted Eudoxius to orders and made him bishop of Germanicia, on the confines of Syria, Cilicia, and Cappadocia. This bishopric he held at least 17 years, the period of the principal intrigues against Athanasius of Alexandria, and of the reigns of Constantine the Great's sons.

In 341 the council of the Dedication or Encaenia was held under Placillus at Antioch. Eudoxius of Antioch attended. He was an Arian pure and simple, a disciple of Aëtius of Antioch, a friend of Eunomius of Cyzicus. The council produced four creeds, in which the Eusebian party succeeded in making their doctrine as plausible as might be, and the second of these became known as the "Creed of the Dedication". Athanasius says that Eudoxius was sent with Martyrius of Antioch and Macedonius I of Constantinople to take the new creed of Antioch to Italy. This new creed may, however, have been the Macrostich, or Long Formula, drawn up at a later council of Antioch.

In 343 or 347 the rival councils of Serdica and Philippopolis were held. At the latter was drawn up a creed more Arian than those of Antioch, and it was signed by Eudoxius. Between 355 and 359 Eudoxius was in attendance on the emperor in the West when news came of the death of Leontius of Antioch. Against the canons, he took over the see of Antioch. Allegedly excusing himself on the plea that the affairs of Germanicia required his presence, Eudoxius hastened to Antioch, and, representing himself as nominated by the emperor, got himself made bishop, and sent Asphalus, a presbyter of Antioch, to make the best of the case at court. Roman emperor Constantius II wrote to the church of Antioch: "Eudoxius went to seek you without my sending him ... To what restraint will men be amenable, who impudently pass from city to city, seeking with a most unlawful appetite every occasion to enrich themselves?". Nonetheless, the emperor confirmed the election.

In the first year of his episcopate at Antioch, Eudoxius held a council, which received the creed of Sirmium. An idea may be formed of the Homoiousian reception of his sermons from three different sources. Hilary of Poitiers, then in the East, heard Eudoxius in his cathedral, and wished his ears had been deaf. Theodoret and Epiphanius of Salamis reported him as boasting that he had the same knowledge about God as God had about Himself.

In September 359, a Council of Seleucia was held at Seleucia Isauria, the orthodox forming a very small minority. The majority signed the "Creed of the Dedication"; Eudoxius who was present, was deposed by Basil of Ancyra's party, and appears to have sought the shelter of the court at Constantinople. Here, by the aid of the Acacians, he secured his appointment as bishop on the deposition of Macedonius I of Constantinople, and on 27 January 360, took possession of his throne in the presence of 72 bishops. On 15 February the great church of Constantinople, Saint Sophia, begun in 342 by the emperor Constantius II, was dedicated.

Eudoxius, it is claimed, mounting his episcopal throne before the expectant multitude of courtiers, ecclesiastics, and citizens, began with the words: "The Father is asebes, the Son is eusebes." A great tumult of indignation arose on all sides in St. Sophia. The orator, unabashed, explained: "The Father is asebes because He honours nobody; the Son is eusebes because He honours the Father". The new cathedral echoed with peals of uncontrollable laughter. Thus, says Socrates of Constantinople, these tore the church to pieces by their captious subtilties.

Eudoxius consecrated his friend Eunomius to the see of Cyzicus, but such complaints were brought to the Roman emperor Constantius II that he ordered Eudoxius to depose him. Eudoxius acquiesced to the emperor's command and quietly persuaded Eunomius to retire.

In 365 an attack was made on Eudoxius by the semi-Arians, now called Macedonians. Holding a meeting at Lampsacus, they signed the "Creed of the Dedication", cited Eudoxius and his party before them, and, as they did not come, sentenced them to deprivation; but Roman emperor Valens refused to confirm the proceedings.

In 367 Valens, as he was setting out for the Gothic War, was induced by his wife Domnica to receive baptism from Eudoxius. In the same year, he issued, likely under the advice of Eudoxius, an order that such bishops as had been banished by Constantius II and had returned under Roman emperor Julian should again be exiled.

The years during which Eudoxius and Valens acted together were allegedly troubled by portents, which Homoousians attributed to the anger of Heaven at Valens' banishment of bishops who would not admit Eudoxius to their communion. Eudoxius died in 370.

== Notes and references ==
=== Attribution ===
- Sinclair cites:
  - Athanasius of Alexandria, ad Solit., in Patrologia Graeca, xxvi, 572, 219, 589, 274, 580, 713, 601;
  - Epiphanius of Cyprus de Haeres, lxxiii, 2;
  - H. E.; II, 16, 38, 40;
  - Hilary of Poitiers, de Synod., Patrologia Latina, X, 471;
  - Liber contr. Const. Imp. §§ 665, 680, 573;
  - Sozomenus. H. E.; IV, 26;
  - Socrates Scholasticus H. E.; II, 19, 37, 40, 43;
  - Theodoret, H. E.; II, 25; Haer. Fab., IV, 3;
  - Theophanes the Confessor Chronogr., § 38; Niceph. Callist. H. E.; XI, 4.

Titles of the Great Christian Church
Preceded by Macedonius I	Archbishop of Constantinople; 360 – 370	Succeeded by Demophilus
