= Pope Julius I =

Head of the Catholic Church from 337 to 352

Pope Saint Julius I
- Bishop of Rome
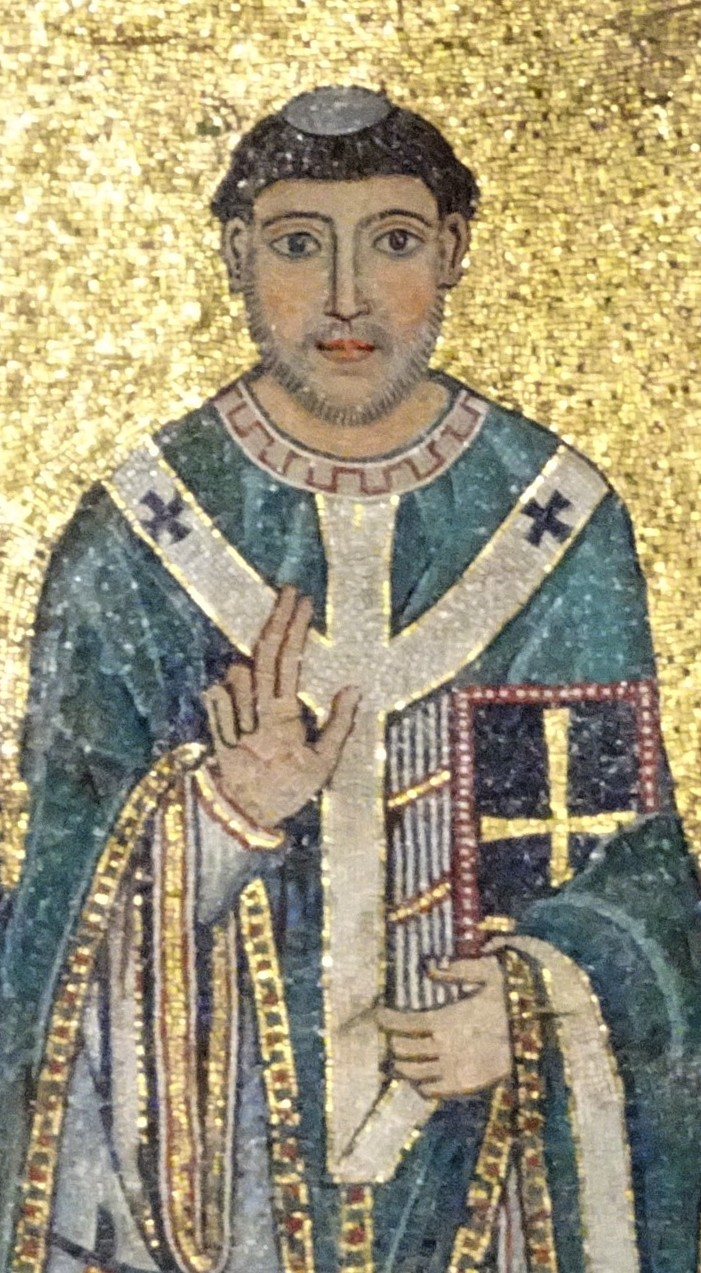
- Pope Julius I depicted in a c. 12th century mosaic from the apse of the Roman church Santa Maria in Trastevere
- Papacy began: 6 February 337
- Papacy ended: 12 April 352
- Predecessor: Mark
- Successor: Liberius

Personal details
- Born: 280 Rome, Roman Empire
- Died: 12 April 352 Rome, Roman Empire

Sainthood
- Feast day: 12 April
- Venerated in: Catholic Church; Eastern Orthodox Church; Oriental Orthodox Church
- Shrines: Basilica of Saint Praxedes

Pope Julius I was the bishop of Rome from 6 February 337 to his death on 12 April 352. He was appealed to by Athanasius when the latter was deposed from his position as patriarch by Arian bishops, Julius then supported Athanasius and condemned his deposition as unjust. He was notable for asserting the authority of the pope over the Arian Eastern bishops, as well as being attributed with the setting of December 25 as the official birthdate of Jesus.

== Pontificate ==
Julius was a native of Rome and was chosen as successor of Pope Mark after the Roman seat had been vacant for four months.

=== Arianism ===
Julius is chiefly known by the part he took in the Arian controversy. After the followers of Eusebius of Nicomedia, who had become the patriarch of Constantinople, renewed their deposition of Athanasius of Alexandria at a synod held in Antioch in 341, they resolved to send delegates to Constans, emperor of the West, and also to Julius, setting forth the grounds on which they had proceeded. Julius, after expressing an opinion favourable to Athanasius, adroitly invited both parties to lay the case before a synod to be presided over by himself. This proposal, however, the Arian Eastern bishops declined to accept.

On this second banishment from Alexandria, Athanasius came to Rome, and was recognised as a regular bishop by the synod presided over by Julius in 342. Julius sent a letter to the Eastern bishops that is an early instance of the claims of primacy for the bishop of Rome. Even if Athanasius and his companions were somewhat to blame, the letter runs, the Alexandrian Church should first have written to the pope. "Can you be ignorant," writes Julius, "that this is the custom, that we should be written to first, so that from here what is just may be defined" (Epistle of Julius to Antioch, c. xxii).

It was through the influence of Julius that, at a later date, the council of Sardica in Illyria was held, which was attended by only seventy-six Eastern bishops, who speedily withdrew to Philippopolis and deposed Julius at the council of Philippopolis, along with Athanasius and others. The three hundred Western bishops who remained, confirmed the previous decisions of the Roman synod and issued a number of decrees regarding church discipline. The first canon forbade the transfer of bishops from one see to another, for if frequently made, it was seen to encourage covetousness and ambition.

By its 3rd, 4th, and 5th decrees relating to the rights of revision claimed by Julius, the council of Sardica perceptibly helped forward the claims of the bishop of Rome. Julius built several basilicas and churches.

=== Christmas ===
Some have stated that, around 350 AD, Julius I declared 25 December as the official date of the birth of Jesus; this is based on a letter quoted only in a 9th-century source, and this letter is spurious. At the time this was one of the commonly believed dates for Jesus' birth and was used by Hippolytus of Rome in his Commentary on Daniel around 200 AD. It is claimed – falsely – that Pope Julius declared 25 December as Christmas after patriarch Cyril of Jerusalem asked for clarification on what date historical records stored in Rome indicate as Jesus' birth. It was also believed that Jesus and John the Baptist were born around the same time from reading the Gospel of Luke.

The actual date of Jesus's birth is unknown. It has been noted that 25 December is two days after the end of the Roman festival of Saturnalia. Some have speculated that part of the reason this date was chosen may have been because Julius was trying to create a Christian alternative to Saturnalia. Another reason for the decision may have been because, in 274 AD, the Roman emperor Aurelian had allegedly declared 25 December the birthdate of Sol Invictus and that Julius I allegedly may have thought that he could attract more converts to Christianity by allowing them to continue to celebrate on the same day, but this cannot be historically verified. He may have also been influenced by the idea that Jesus had died on the anniversary of his conception; because Jesus died during Passover and, in the third century AD, Passover was celebrated on 25 March, he may have assumed that Jesus's birthday must have come nine months later, on 25 December.

== Death and veneration ==
Julius I died in Rome on 12 April 352. He was succeeded by Liberius. Julius is venerated as a saint by the Catholic Church. His feast day is on 12 April.

== See also ==
- List of Catholic saints
- List of popes

== Notes ==
Titles of the Great Christian Church
Preceded by Mark	Bishop of Rome; Pope; 337–352	Succeeded by Liberius
