= Pope Liberius =

Head of the Catholic Church from 352 to 366

- Bishop of Rome
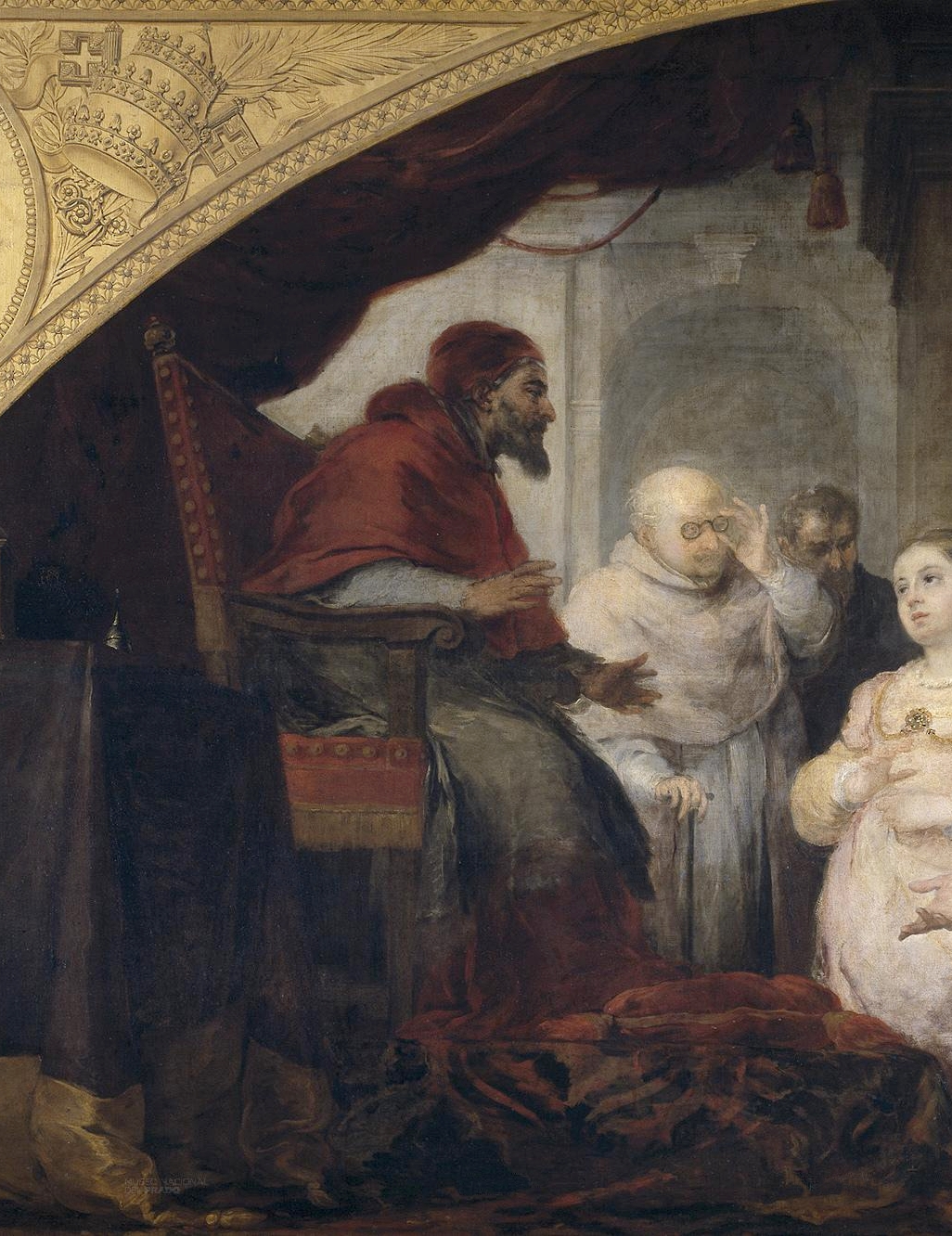
- Liberius painted by Bartolomé Esteban Murillo, from his painting John the Patrician and his Wife Revealing their Dream to Pope Liberius
- Church: Catholic Church
- Papacy began: 17 May 352 (Note: The Liberian Catalogue lists the date of Liberius's consecration as 22 May. Catholic Encyclopedia gives 17 May, noting that the 22nd was not a Sunday. The date could also be 21 June, a Sunday, which differs from 22 May by only one letter in the Roman calendar (XI Kal. Jun/Jul.))
- Papacy ended: 24 September 366
- Predecessor: Julius I
- Successor: Damasus I

Personal details
- Born: 310 Rome, Roman Empire
- Died: 24 September 366 Rome, Italy, Roman Empire

Sainthood
- Venerated in: Eastern Orthodox Church Oriental Orthodox Church

Pope Liberius (310 – 24 September 366) was the bishop of Rome from 17 May 352 until his death on 24 September 366. According to the Catalogus Liberianus, he was consecrated on 22 May as the successor to Julius I. He is not mentioned as a saint in the Roman Martyrology, making him the earliest pontiff not to be venerated as a saint in the Catholic Church and, along with Anastasius II, one of only two popes to be omitted from Catholic sainthood in the first 500 years of church history.

Liberius is mentioned in the Greek Menology, the Eastern equivalent to the martyrologies of the Western Church and a measure of sainthood prior to the institution of the formal Western processes of canonization.

== Pontificate ==
The first recorded act of Liberius was, after a synod had been held at Rome, to write to Emperor Constantius II, then in quarters at Arles (353–354), asking that a council might be called at Aquileia with reference to the affairs of Athanasius of Alexandria, but his messenger Vincentius of Capua was compelled by the emperor at a conciliabulum held in Arles to subscribe against his will to a condemnation of the orthodox patriarch of Alexandria.

Constantius was sympathetic to the Arians, and when he could not persuade Liberius to his point of view sent the pope to a prison in Beroea. At the end of an exile of more than two years in Thrace, after which it seems he may have temporarily relented, or been set up to appear to have relented – partially evidenced by three letters, quite possibly forgeries, ascribed to Liberius, the emperor recalled him under extreme pressure from the Roman population who refused to recognize his puppet, Felix II. As the Roman See was "officially" occupied by Felix, a year passed before Liberius was sent to Rome. It was the emperor's intention that Liberius should govern the Church jointly with Felix, but on the arrival of Liberius, Felix was expelled by the Roman people. Neither Liberius nor Felix took part in the Council of Rimini (359).

The return of the Pope from exile was met with joy from the Roman people but it was also met with criticism. The writer Philostorgius says that the Pope Liberius was restored to papacy only after he signed the Second Creed of Sirmium, and although Sozomen claimed that this story was a lie, Hilary of Poitiers reacted by writing concerning the pope: "I know not whether it was with greater impiety that you exiled him than that you restored him" (Contra Const., II). Some of those writers who accept the forged letters and testimonies of Arians, Semi-arians and Luciferians, concede Pope Liberius repented later for having signed the Arian Creed at Sirmium, but that he ever signed is highly doubtful on the basis of a critical examination of the original sources.

After the death of the Emperor Constantius in 361, Liberius annulled the decrees of that assembly but, with the concurrence of bishops Athanasius and Hilary of Poitiers, retained the bishops who had signed and then withdrew their adherence. In 366, Liberius gave a favourable reception to a deputation of the Eastern episcopate, and admitted into his communion the more moderate of the old Arian party. He died on 24 September 366.

Some historians have postulated that Liberius resigned the papacy in 365, in order to make sense of the pontificate of Felix II, who has since been regarded as an antipope.

== Legacy ==
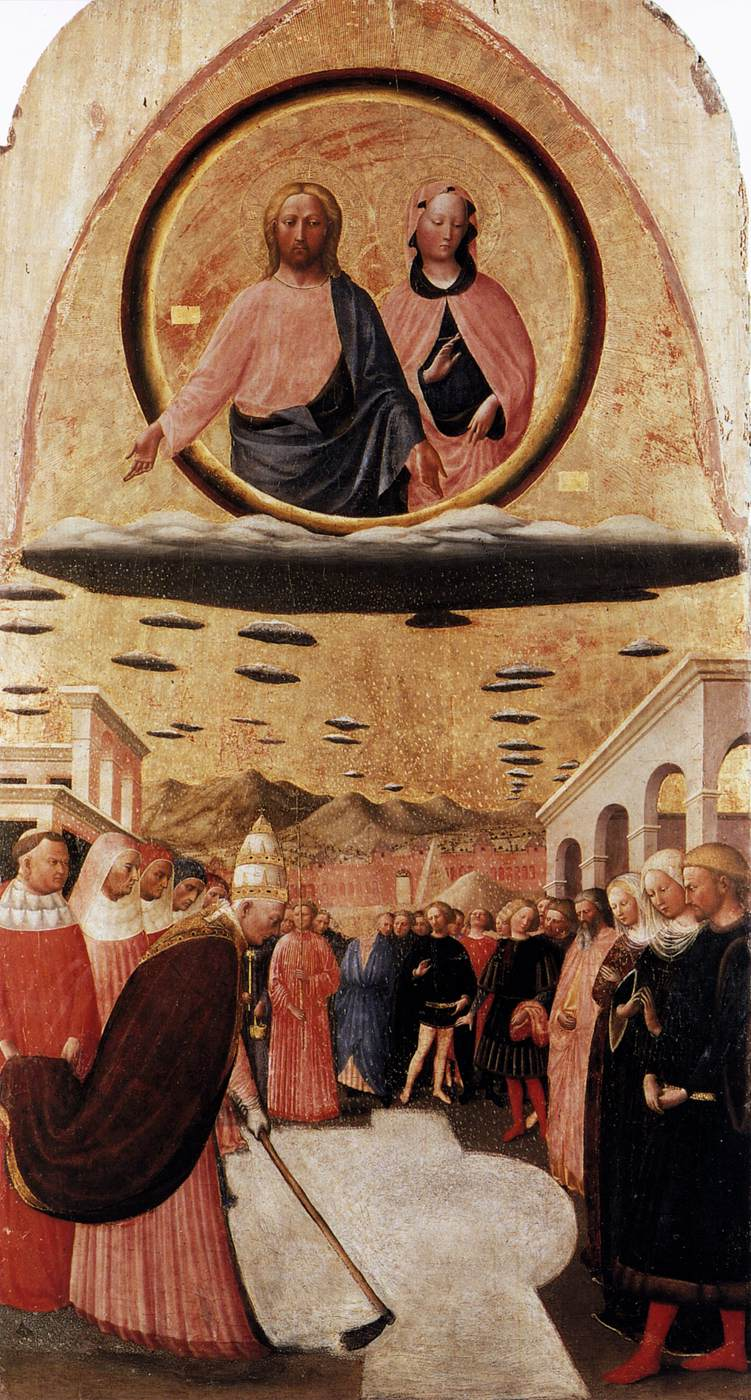
Founding of Santa Maria Maggiore (Masolino da Panicale, 1428/29), depicts Pope Liberius performing the groundbreaking

Pope Pius IX noted in his 1863 encyclical Quartus supra that Liberius was falsely accused by the Arians and he had refused to condemn Athanasius of Alexandria. However, Athanasius said that Pope Liberius condemned him after the Emperor Constantius II threatened to kill the Pope. (Note: Quote of Athanasius: "Liberius, having been exiled, gave in after two years, and, in fear of the death with which he was threatened, signed" (Hist. Ar., xli)) In his 1920 encyclical Principi Apostolorum Petro, Pope Benedict XV noted that Pope Liberius went fearlessly into exile in defence of the orthodox faith.

In the Eastern Orthodox Church, Liberius is a saint whose feast is celebrated on 27 August. In Coptic Christianity, the Departure of St Liberius the Bishop of Rome is commemorated on 4 Pi Kogi Enavot.

The Basilica di Santa Maria Maggiore in Rome is sometimes referred to as the Liberian Basilica.

== Sources ==
Titles of the Great Christian Church
Preceded by Julius I	Bishop of Rome; 352–366	Succeeded by Damasus I
