= Arianism =

Christological doctrine attributed to Arius

Arianism (Koine Greek: Ἀρειανισμός, romanized: Areianismós) has traditionally been defined as a distinct Christological doctrine formulated by the Alexandrian presbyter Arius, which rejected the Trinity and taught that Jesus Christ was a created being subordinate to God the Father. However, modern patristic scholarship—including historians such as Lewis Ayres, R.P.C. Hanson, and Rowan Williams—has heavily critiqued the term "Arianism" as a misleading historiographical misnomer. Scholars emphasize that no single, coherent "Arian" party existed, nor was there a unified school of thought devoted to Arius's specific writings. Instead, those who opposed the First Council of Nicaea and the Nicene Creed comprised a diverse, loose coalition (often termed the "Eusebian" trajectory) united primarily by their opposition to the homoousios rather than adherence to Arius as an authoritative founder.

'Arian' (Eusebian) theology holds that Jesus is the Son of God, (Note: "Arius wanted to emphasise the transcendence and sole divinity of God [...]. God alone is, for Arius, without beginning, unbegotten and eternal. In the terminology of negative theology, Arius stresses monotheism with ever-renewed attempts. God can only be understood as creator. He denies the co-eternal state of the Logos with God since otherwise God would be stripped of his absolute uniqueness. God alone is, and thus he was not always Father. [...] Following Proverbs 8:22–25, Arius is able to argue that the Son was created. For Arius the Logos belongs wholly on the side of the Divine, but he is markedly subordinate to God. Berndt & Steinacher 2014) (Note: "A heresy of the Christian Church, started by Arius, bishop of Alexandria (d. 336), who taught that the Son is not equivalent to the Father (ὁμοούσιος gr:homoousios ≅ lt:consubstantialis) ... The very insistence upon the more subordinate relationship of the Son—that is, the Messiah—to God-the-father is much nearer to the Jewish doctrine of the Messiah than to the conception of the full divinity of the Son, as enunciated at Nicaea.") who was begotten by God the Father, with the difference that the Son of God did not always exist but was begotten/made (Note: Arius used the two words as synonyms) before time by God the Father. (Note: Arius believed that Jesus came into existence before time existed.) Therefore, Jesus was not coeternal with God the Father, but nonetheless Jesus began to exist outside time. (Note: Jesus was considered a creature but not like the other creatures.) While Nicene theology held that the Father and Son are a single Being, 'Arianism' holds that the Son is distinct from the Father and therefore subordinate to him. Included in ‘Arianism’ are views that the Son is a created being, as Arius held, and views that the Son was mysteriously begotten from the Father’s being, as held by Eusebius of Caesarea, one of the two main leaders of ‘Arianism.’

'Arianism' is named after Arius (250 or 256 – 336 AD) and is regarded as heretical by most modern mainstream branches of Christianity. Arianism is held by a minority of modern denominations, although some of these groups espouse related doctrines such as Socinianism, and others avoid the term "Arian" because of its historically negative connotations. Modern denominations sometimes associated with the teaching include Jehovah's Witnesses and some churches within the Churches of Christ (among them the movement's founder, Barton W. Stone).

It is traditionally first attributed to Arius, a Christian presbyter who preached and studied in Alexandria, Egypt, though Arianism developed out of various preexisting strands of Christianity that differed from later Nicene Christianity in their Christologies. Modern patristic scholarship describes the fourth-century controversy as the result of deep, pre-existing theological tensions, not something Arius caused, and describes Arius as a theological conservative.

The term Arian is derived from the name Arius; it was not what the followers of Arius's teachings called themselves, but rather a polemical term used by outsiders, to tar enemies with the name of a figure already in disrepute.

Aëtius of Antioch and his disciple Eunomius of Cyzicus later gave Arius’s trinitarian theology an extreme form. Their opponents described this teaching as anomoean ('dissimilar'), asserting that the Son was wholly dissimilar to the Father. Homoian Arians repeatedly defended themselves against accusations of holding the same position.

The nature of Arius's and his supporters' teachings were opposed to the theological doctrines held by Homoousian Christians regarding the nature of the Trinity and the nature of Christ. Homoousianism and Arianism were contending interpretations of Jesus's divinity, both based upon the trinitarian theological orthodoxy of the time.

Homoousianism was formally affirmed by the first two ecumenical councils; since then, Arianism has been condemned as "the heresy or sect of Arius". Trinitarian (Homoousian) doctrines were vigorously upheld by Patriarch Athanasius of Alexandria, who insisted that Jesus (God the Son) was "same in being" or "same in essence" with God the Father. Arius dissented: "If the Father begat the Son, then he who was begotten had a beginning in existence, and from this it follows there was a time when the Son was not." The ecumenical First Council of Nicaea of 325 declared Arianism to be a heresy. According to Everett Ferguson, "The great majority of Christians had no clear views about the nature of the Trinity and they did not understand what was at stake in the issues that surrounded it."

Arianism is also used to refer to other nontrinitarian theological systems of the 4th century, which regarded Jesus—the Son of God and the Logos—as either a begotten creature of a similar or different substance to that of the Father, but not identical (as Homoiousian and Anomoeanism) or as neither uncreated nor created in the sense other beings are created (as in semi-Arianism).

== Origin ==
Some early Christians whose beliefs would have fallen under 'orthodoxy' in the third and fourth centuries denied the eternal generation of the Son; they viewed the Son as having been begotten in time. These include Tertullian and Justin Martyr. Tertullian is considered a pre-Arian. Among the other church fathers, Origen was accused of Arianism for using terms like "second God", and Patriarch Dionysius of Alexandria was denounced at Rome for saying that the Son is a work and creature of God (i.e., a created being). However, the subordinationism of Origen is not identical to Arianism, and it has been generally viewed as closer to the Nicene-Constantinopolitan view of the Trinity.

Controversy over Arianism arose in the late 3rd century and persisted throughout most of the 4th century. It involved most church members—from simple believers, priests, and monks to bishops, emperors, and members of Rome's imperial family. Two Roman emperors, Constantius II and Valens, became Arians or semi-Arians, as did prominent Gothic, Vandal, and Lombard warlords both before and after the fall of the Western Roman Empire. The antipopes Felix II and Ursinus (Note: Ambrose of Milan, Epistles iv) were Arian, and Pope Liberius was forced to sign the Arian Creed of Sirmium of 357—though the letter says he willingly agreed with Arianism. Such a deep controversy within the early Church during this period could not have materialized without significant historical influences providing a basis for the Arian doctrines.

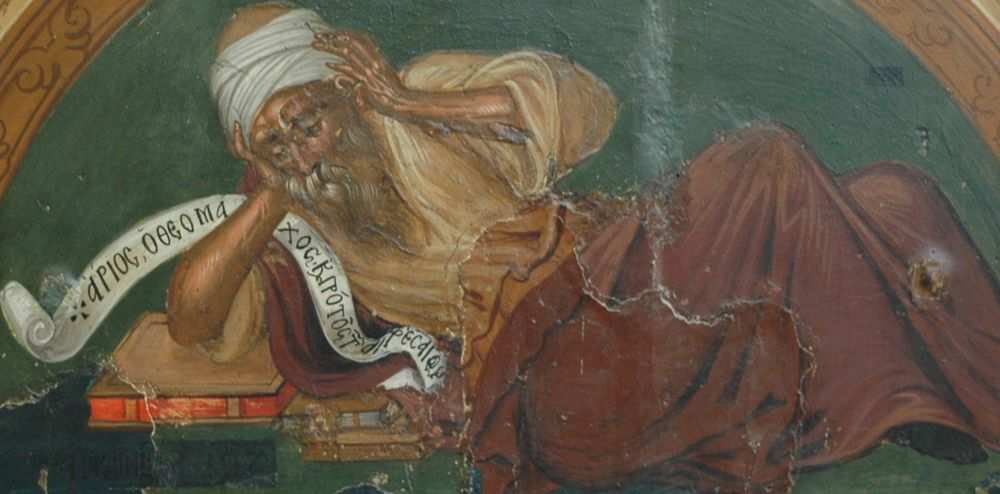
An imagined portrait of Arius. Detail of a Cretan School icon, c. 1591, depicting the First Council of Nicaea

Arius had been a pupil of Lucian of Antioch at Lucian's private academy in Antioch and inherited from him a modified form of the teachings of Paul of Samosata. Arius taught that God the Father and the Son of God did not always exist together eternally.

== Beliefs ==
Little of Arius's own work survives except in quotations selected for polemical purposes by his opponents, and there is no certainty about what theological and philosophical traditions formed his thought. The influence from the One of Neoplatonism was widespread throughout the Eastern Roman Empire, and this influenced Arius.

Arius's basic premise is that only God is independent of existing. Since the Son is dependent, he must, therefore, be called a creature. Arians put forward a question for their belief: "Has God birthed Jesus willingly or unwillingly?" This question was used to argue that Jesus is dependent for his existence since Jesus exists only because God wants him to be.

Arianism taught that the Logos was a divine being created by God the Father before the world's creation, serving as the medium for creation, and that the Son of God is subordinate to the Father. The concept of the Logos refers to an inner attribute of God associated with wisdom. Jesus is identified as the Logos due to a supposed resemblance to this inner aspect of God's nature.

According to Arianism, a verse from the Book of Proverbs spoke of the creation of the Son by God: "The Lord created me at the beginning of his work." Therefore, they posited, the Son was rather the very first and the most perfect of God's creatures, and he was called "God" only by the Father's permission and power. The term "Son" is ambiguous, as Arians use adoptionist theology to support the belief that Jesus was created ex nihilo by the Father.

Arians do not believe in the traditional doctrine of the Trinity. The letter of the Arian bishop Auxentius of Durostorum regarding the Arian missionary Ulfilas (c. 311–383) gives an overview of Arian beliefs. Ulfilas, ordained by Arian bishop Eusebius of Nicomedia, became a missionary to the Goths and believed that God the Father, the "unbegotten" Almighty, is the only true God. According to Auxentius, Ulfilas believed the Son of God, Jesus, the "only-begotten god", was begotten before time began. The Holy Spirit, he wrote, is the illuminating and sanctifying power of God. Using 1 Corinthians 8:5–6 as a proof text:

Indeed, even though there may be so-called gods in heaven or on earth—as in fact there are many gods and many lords/masters—yet for us there is one God (Gk. theos – θεός), the Father, from whom are all things and for whom we exist, and one Lord/Master (kyrios – κύριος), Jesus Christ, through whom are all things and through whom we exist.

— 1 Corinthians 8:5–6

The creed of Ulfilas, which concludes the letter mentioned above, distinguishes God the Father ("unbegotten"), who is the only true God, from the Son of God ("only-begotten") and the Holy Spirit, the illuminating and sanctifying power, which is neither God the Father nor the God the Son:

I, Ulfila, bishop and confessor, have always so believed, and in this, the one true faith, I make the journey to my Lord; I believe in only one God the Father, the unbegotten and invisible, and in his only-begotten Son, our Lord/Master and God, the designer and maker of all creation, having none other like him. Therefore, there is one God of all, who is also God of our God; and in one Holy Spirit, the illuminating and sanctifying power, as Christ said after his resurrection to his apostles: "And behold, I send the promise of my Father upon you; but tarry ye in the city of Jerusalem, until ye be clothed with power from on high" and again "But ye shall receive power, when the Holy Ghost is come upon you"; Neither God nor Lord, but the faithful minister of Christ; not equal, but subject and obedient in all things to the Son. And I believe the Son to be subject and obedient in all things to God the Father.

— Heather & Matthews 1991, p. 143

Within the letter from Arius to Eusebius of Nicomedia, Arius qualifies his beliefs about the Son:

We are not able to listen to these kinds of impieties, even if the heretics threaten us with ten thousand deaths. But what do we say and think and what have we previously taught and do we presently teach?—that the Son is not unbegotten, nor a part of an unbegotten entity in any way, nor from anything in existence, but that he is subsisting in will and intention before time and before the ages, fully God, the only-Begotten, unchangeable.

Arius would teach that the Son had a beginning in the Father, and rejected the idea of homoousios because it would imply the essence of the Father was materially broken off like gold from a bar. He would emphasize that the Father is true God (per se) and the Son and the Holy Spirit were derivative. This was a radical and strict theological interpretation of the already prevalent subordinationist and monarchical language used by the early Church Fathers. Former Archbishop of Canterbury, Rowan Williams, in his work Arius: Heresy and Tradition, wrote, "Arius's primary motivation was not to 'demote' the Son, but to protect the absolute uniqueness and transcendence of the Father as the sole source of all things ... He was an arch-conservative, a lonely and somewhat pedantic figure, clinging to a theological style that was rapidly becoming obsolete."

In Arius's mind, to be 'begotten' was logically the same as being 'created' in the sense that both imply a dependence on the Father’s will. By calling the Son a 'perfect creature', he was actually exalting him as the supreme being through whom all else was made.

Arius would be noted as wanting to preserve the monarchy of the Father from modalism (homoousios used for modalism in Paul of Samosata, condemned in the Synod of Antioch (264–269)), from gnostic partialism (homoousios was used to explain the emanations). In the gnostic sense, it implied that the divine substance was like a physical dough that could be pulled apart into different pieces. Arius affirmed Jesus was God, yet God begotten or derived from the Father (who is autotheos), and the Holy Spirit was created or proceeded from the Son (as the first of his works). This was due to his synthesis of trinitarianism and middle platonism which posited the transcendent (the One), and its Logos (visible Mediator).

For Arius, the Son was eternal, fully God, yet subordinate to the Father; being God in every sense except being unbegotten (agennetos), but being begotten (gennetos). For Arius, the Son is eternally begotten and the eternal birth of the Son is within the bosom of the Father. Yet, the Father has no birth or beginning in another. Thus, they are not co-eternal in the same sense, but one is beginningless eternally, fully God the only Unbegotten; the other is eternally beginning, fully God the only Begotten. This would be noted by scholars have been important in the logical order used to explain the relations of origin of the persons of the Trinity. However, during the proceedings of the First Council of Nicaea, Arius saw the homoiousian party, which promulgated one hypostasis, as a radical theological innovation.

Therefore, he taught three hypostases, to safeguard the unbegotten esse of the Father in his own eyes, preserving monarchia through hypostatic distinctions. The Nicene party would see his explanations as implying relations and begetting in a temporal manner. The monohypostatic language to unify the persons can be found in the anathema concomitant to the Nicene Creed. “But those who say, 'There was when he was not,' and 'Before being begotten he was not,' and that he came to be from things that are not, or who say that the Son of God is from a different hypostasis or ousia, or created, or changeable, or alterable – these the catholic and apostolic Church anathematizes."

Thus, a radical departure began with the Arian party strictly defining God the Father as true God and the Son not co-eternal in that same respect; the Nicene party unifying the persons of the Trinity through homoiousian logic as theologian Lewis Ayres would explain in his work Nicaea and Its Legacy. For Arius, the term 'God' properly applies to the Father alone because He is the only one who is unbegotten (agennetos). To say the Son is 'true God' in the same sense as the Father was, for Arius, to introduce two first principles and thus to fall into pagan polytheism.

So in essence, Arius taught that the Son was fully God eternally as the divine Logos, wishing to stress the monarchical language used at the time to defend the Monarchia of the Father. However, due to his own pride and overscrupulousness, such a sentiment was not understood by opponents.

Principally, the dispute between Trinitarianism and Arianism was about two questions:

- has the Son always existed eternally with the Father, or was the Son begotten at a certain time in the past?
- is the Son equal to the Father or subordinate to the Father?

For Constantine, these were minor theological points that stood in the way of uniting the Empire, but for the theologians, it was of huge importance; for them, it was a matter of salvation.

For the theologians of the 19th century, it was already obvious that, in fact, Arius and Alexander/Athanasius did not have much to quarrel about; the difference between their views was very small, and the end of the fight was by no means clear during their quarrel, both Arius and Athanasius suffering a great deal for their own views. Arius was the father of homoiousianism, and Alexander was the father of homoousianism, which Athanasius championed. For those theologians, it was clear that Arius, Alexander, and Athanasius were far from a true doctrine of the Trinity, which developed later, historically speaking.

Guido M. Berndt and Roland Steinacher state clearly that the beliefs of Arius were acceptable ("not especially unusual") to a huge number of orthodox clergy; this is the reason why such a major conflict was able to develop inside the Church since Arius's theology received widespread sympathy (or at least was not considered to be overly controversial) and could not be dismissed outright as individual heresy.

== Homoian Arianism ==
Arianism had several different variants, including Eunomianism and Homoian Arianism. Homoian Arianism is associated with Acacius and Eudoxius. Homoian Arianism avoided the use of the word ousia to describe the relation of Father to Son, and described these as "like" each other. Hanson lists twelve creeds that reflect the Homoian faith:

1. The Second Sirmian Creed of 357
2. The Creed of Nice (Constantinople) 360
3. The creed put forward by Acacius at Seleucia, 359
4. The Rule of Faith of Ulfilas
5. The creed uttered by Ulfilas on his deathbed, 383
6. The creed attributed to Eudoxius
7. The Creed of Auxentius of Milan, 364
8. The Creed of Germinius professed in correspondence with Ursacius of Singidunum and Valens of Mursa
9. Palladius's rule of faith
10. Three credal statements found in fragments, subordinating the Son to the Father

== Struggles with orthodoxy ==
=== First Council of Nicaea ===
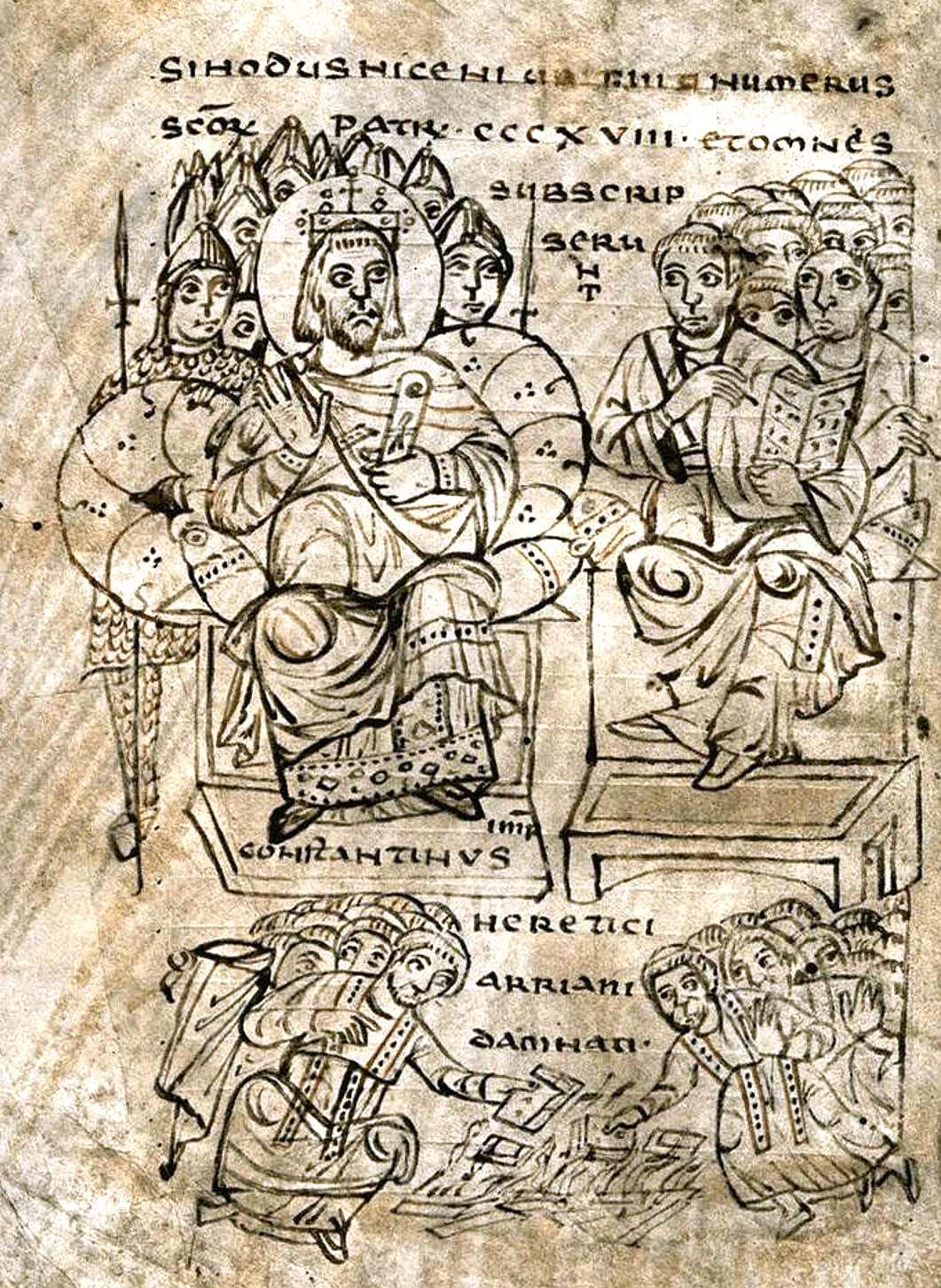
Constantine burning Arian books, illustration from a compendium of canon law, c. 825

In 321, Arius was denounced by a synod at Alexandria for teaching a heterodox view of the relationship of Jesus to God the Father. Because Arius and his followers had great influence in the schools of Alexandria—counterparts to modern universities or seminaries—their theological views spread, especially in the eastern Mediterranean.

By 325, the controversy had become significant enough that the Emperor Constantine called an assembly of bishops, the First Council of Nicaea, which condemned Arius's doctrine and formulated the original Nicene Creed of 325. The Nicene Creed's central term, used to describe the relationship between the Father and the Son, is Homoousios (Ancient Greek: ὁμοούσιος), or Consubstantiality, meaning "of the same substance" or "of one being". The Athanasian Creed is less often used but is a more overtly anti-Arian statement on the Trinity.

The focus of the Council of Nicaea was the nature of the Son of God and his precise relationship to God the Father. (See Paul of Samosata and the Synods of Antioch.) Arius taught that Jesus Christ was divine or holy and was sent to Earth for the salvation of mankind, but that Jesus Christ was not equal to God the Father (infinite, primordial origin) in rank, and that God the Father and the Son of God were not equal to the Holy Spirit. Under Arianism, Christ was instead not consubstantial with God the Father since both the Father and the Son under Arius were made of "like" essence or being (see homoiousia) but not of the same essence or being (see homoousia). (Note: "The oneness of Essence, the Equality of Divinity, and the Equality of Honor of God the Son with the God the Father.")

In the Arian view, God the Father is a deity and is divine; the Son of God is not a deity, but is still divine. God the Father sent Jesus to earth for salvation of mankind. Ousia is essence or being, in Eastern Christianity, and is the aspect of God that is completely incomprehensible to mankind and human perception. It is all that subsists by itself and which has not its being in another, God the Father and God the Son and God the Holy Spirit all being uncreated. (Note: As quoted by John Damascene: God is unoriginate, unending, eternal, constant, uncreated, unchanging, unalterable, simple, incomplex, bodiless, invisible, intangible, indescribable, without bounds, inaccessible to the mind, uncontainable, incomprehensible, good, righteous, that Creator of all creatures, the almighty Pantocrator.)

According to the teaching of Arius, the preexistent Logos and thus the incarnate Jesus Christ was a begotten being; only the Son was directly begotten by God the Father, before ages, but was of a distinct, though similar, essence or substance from the Creator. His opponents argued that this would make Jesus less than God and that this was heretical. Much of the distinction between the differing factions was over the phrasing that Christ expressed in the New Testament to express submission to God the Father. The theological term for this submission is kenosis. This ecumenical council declared that Jesus Christ was true God, co-eternal and consubstantial (i.e., of the same substance) with God the Father. (Note: First, the central focus of the creed is the Trinitarian nature of God. The Nicene fathers argued that the Father was always a Father, and consequently that the Son always existed with him, co-equally and con-substantially. The Nicene fathers fought against the belief that the Son was unequal to the Father, because it effectively destroyed the unity of the Godhead. Rather, they insisted that such a view was in contravention of such Scriptures as John 10:30 "I and the Father are one" and John 1:1 "the Word was God." Saint Athanasius declared that the Son had no beginning, but had an "eternal derivation" from the Father, and therefore was co-eternal with him, and equal to God in all aspects. In a similar vein the Cappadocian Fathers argued that the Holy Spirit was also co-eternal with the Father and the Son and equal to God in all aspects. The Church Fathers held that to deny equality to any of the Persons of the Trinity was to rob God of existence and constituted the greatest heresy.)

Constantine is believed to have exiled those who refused to accept the Nicaean Creed—Arius himself, the deacon Euzoios, and the Libyan bishops Theonas of Marmarica and Secundus of Ptolemais, along with the bishops who signed the creed but refused to join in condemnation of Arius, Eusebius of Nicomedia and Theognis of Nicaea. The emperor also ordered all copies of the Thalia, the book in which Arius had expressed his teachings, to be burned. However, there is no evidence that his son and ultimate successor, Constantius II, a Semi-Arian Christian, was exiled.

Although he was committed to maintaining what the Great Church had defined at Nicaea, Constantine was also bent on pacifying the situation and eventually became more lenient toward those condemned and exiled at the council. First, he allowed Eusebius of Nicomedia, who was a protégé of his sister, and Theognis to return once they had signed an ambiguous statement of faith. The two, and other friends of Arius, worked for Arius's rehabilitation.

At the First Synod of Tyre in AD 335, they brought accusations against Athanasius, now bishop of Alexandria, the primary opponent of Arius. After this, Constantine had Athanasius banished since he considered him an impediment to reconciliation. In the same year, the Synod of Jerusalem under Constantine's direction readmitted Arius to communion in 336. Arius died on the way to this event in Constantinople. Some scholars suggest that Arius may have been poisoned by his opponents. Eusebius and Theognis remained in the Emperor's favor; when Constantine—who had been a catechumen much of his adult life—accepted baptism on his deathbed, it was from Eusebius of Nicomedia.

=== Condemnation by the Council of Nicaea ===
Emperor Constantine the Great summoned the First Council of Nicaea, which defined the dogmatic fundaments of Christianity; these definitions served to rebut the questions posed by Arians. Since Arius was not a bishop, he was not allowed to sit on the council, and it was Eusebius of Nicomedia who spoke for him and the position he represented. All the bishops who were there were in agreement with the major theological points of the proto-orthodoxy, since at that time all other forms of Christianity "had by this time already been displaced, suppressed, reformed, or destroyed".

Although the proto-orthodox won the previous disputes, due to the more precise defining of orthodoxy, they were vanquished with their own weapons, ultimately being declared heretics, not because they would have fought against ideas regarded as theologically correct, but because their positions lacked the precision and refinement needed by the fusion of several contradictory theses accepted at the same time by later orthodox theologians.

Of the roughly 300 bishops in attendance at the Council of Nicaea, two bishops did not sign the Nicene Creed that condemned Arianism. Constantine the Great also ordered a penalty of death for those who refused to surrender the Arian writings:

In addition, if any writing composed by Arius should be found, it should be handed over to the flames, so that not only will the wickedness of his teaching be obliterated, but nothing will be left even to remind anyone of him. And I hereby make a public order, that if someone should be discovered to have hidden a writing composed by Arius, and not to have immediately brought it forward and destroyed it by fire, his penalty shall be death. As soon as he is discovered in this offence, he shall be submitted for capital punishment. ...

— Edict by Emperor Constantine against the Arians

Ten years after the Council of Nicaea, Constantine the Great, who was himself later baptized by the Arian bishop Eusebius of Nicomedia in 337 AD, convened another gathering of church leaders at the regional First Synod of Tyre in 335, attended by 310 bishops, to address various charges mounted against Athanasius by his detractors, such as "murder, illegal taxation, sorcery, and treason", following his refusal to readmit Arius into fellowship. Athanasius was exiled to Trier (in modern Germany) following his conviction at Tyre of conspiracy, and Arius was, effectively, exonerated.

Athanasius eventually returned to Alexandria in 346, after the deaths of both Arius and Constantine. Though Arianism had spread, Athanasius and other Nicene Christian church leaders crusaded against Arian theology, and Arius was anathemised and condemned as a heretic once more at the ecumenical First Council of Constantinople of 381, attended by 150 bishops. The Roman Emperors Constantius II (337–361) and Valens (364–378) were Arians or Semi-Arians, as was the first King of Italy, Odoacer (433?–493), and the Lombards were also Arians or Semi-Arians until the 7th century. The ruling elite of Visigothic Spain was Arian until 589. Many Goths adopted Arian beliefs upon their conversion to Christianity. The Vandals actively spread Arianism in North Africa.

=== Aftermath of Nicaea ===
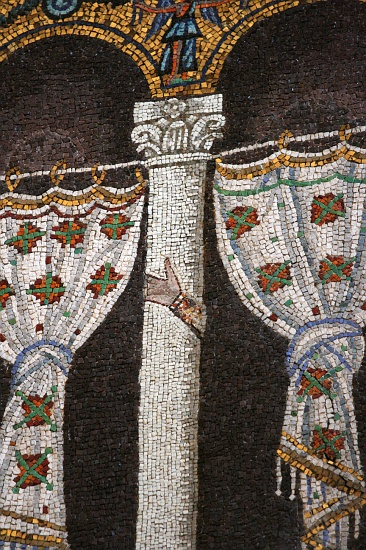
Once the orthodox Trinitarians succeeded in defeating Arianism, they censored any signs that the perceived heresy left behind. This mosaic in the Basilica of Sant'Apollinare Nuovo in Ravenna has had images of the Arian king, Theoderic, and his court removed. On some columns their hands remain.

The First Council of Nicaea did not end the controversy, as many bishops of the Eastern provinces disputed the homoousios, the central term of the Nicene Creed, as it had been used by Paul of Samosata, who had advocated a monarchianist Christology. Both the man and his teaching, including the term homoousios, had been condemned by the Synods of Antioch in 269. Hence, after Constantine's death in 337, open dispute resumed again. Constantine's son Constantius II, who had become emperor of the eastern part of the Roman Empire, actually encouraged the Arians and set out to reverse the Nicene Creed. His advisor in these affairs was Eusebius of Nicomedia, who had already at the Council of Nicaea been the head of the Arian party, and was made the bishop of Constantinople.

Constantius used his power to exile bishops adhering to the Nicene Creed, especially St Athanasius of Alexandria, who fled to Rome. In 355 Constantius became the sole Roman emperor and extended his pro-Arian policy toward the western provinces, frequently using force to push through his creed, even exiling Pope Liberius and installing Antipope Felix II.

The Third Council of Sirmium in 357 was the high point of Arianism. The Seventh Arian Confession (Second Sirmium Confession) held that both homoousios (of one substance) and homoiousios (of similar substance) were unbiblical and that the Father is greater than the Son. This confession was later known as the Blasphemy of Sirmium.

But since many persons are disturbed by questions concerning what is called in Latin substantia, but in Greek ousia, that is, to make it understood more exactly, as to 'coessential,' or what is called, 'like-in-essence,' there ought to be no mention of any of these at all, nor exposition of them in the Church, for this reason and for this consideration, that in divine Scripture nothing is written about them, and that they are above men's knowledge and above men's understanding;

As debates raged in an attempt to come up with a new formula, three camps evolved among the opponents of the Nicene Creed. The first group mainly opposed the Nicene terminology and preferred the term homoiousios (alike in substance) to the Nicene homoousios, while they rejected Arius and his teaching and accepted the equality and co-eternality of the persons of the Trinity. Because of this centrist position, and despite their rejection of Arius, they were called "Semi-Arians" by their opponents.

The second group also avoided invoking the name of Arius, but in large part followed Arius's teachings and, in another attempted compromise wording, described the Son as being like (homoios) the Father. A third group explicitly called upon Arius and described the Son as unlike (anhomoios) the Father. Constantius wavered in his support between the first and the second party, while harshly persecuting the third.

Epiphanius of Salamis labeled the party of Basil of Ancyra in 358 "Semi-Arianism". This is considered unfair by Kelly who states that some members of the group were virtually orthodox from the start but disliked the adjective homoousios while others had moved in that direction after the out-and-out Arians had come into the open.

The debates among these groups resulted in numerous synods, among them the Council of Serdica in 343, the Fourth Council of Sirmium in 358 and the double Council of Rimini and Seleucia in 359, and no fewer than fourteen further creed formulas between 340 and 360. This led the pagan observer Ammianus Marcellinus to comment sarcastically: "The highways were covered with galloping bishops." None of these attempts was acceptable to the defenders of Nicene orthodoxy. Writing about the latter councils, Saint Jerome remarked that the world "awoke with a groan to find itself Arian."

After Constantius's death in 361, his successor Julian, a devotee of Rome's pagan gods, declared that he would no longer attempt to favor one church faction over another, and allowed all exiled bishops to return. This increased dissension among Nicene Christians. The emperor Valens, however, revived Constantius's policy and supported the "Homoian" party, exiling bishops and often using force. During this persecution many bishops were exiled to the other ends of the Roman Empire, e.g., Saint Hilary of Poitiers to the eastern provinces. These contacts and their common plight led to a rapprochement between the western supporters of the Nicene Creed and the homoousios and the eastern Semi-Arians.

=== Council of Constantinople ===
It was not until the co-reigns of Gratian and Theodosius that Arianism was effectively wiped out among the ruling class and elite of the Eastern Empire. Valens died in the Battle of Adrianople in 378 and was succeeded by Theodosius I, who adhered to the Nicene Creed. (Note: Early in his reign, during a serious illness, Theodosius had accepted Christian baptism. In 380 he proclaimed himself a Christian of the Nicene Creed, and he called a council at Constantinople to put an end to the Arian heresy (which, contrary to Nicene doctrine, claimed Jesus was created), which had divided the empire for over half a century. At Constantinople, 150 bishops gathered and revised the Nicene Creed of A.D. 325 into the creed we know today. Arianism has never made a serious challenge since.) This allowed for settling the dispute. Theodosius's wife St Flacilla was instrumental in his campaign to end Arianism.

Two days after Theodosius arrived in Constantinople, 24 November 380, he expelled the Arian bishop, Demophilus of Constantinople, and surrendered the churches of that city to Gregory of Nazianzus, the Homoousian leader of the rather small Nicene community there, an act which provoked rioting. Theodosius had just been baptized, by bishop Acholius of Thessalonica, during a severe illness, as was common in the early Christian world. In February he and Gratian had published an edict that all their subjects should profess the faith of the bishops of Rome and Alexandria (i.e., the Nicene faith), or be handed over for punishment for not doing so.

Although much of the church hierarchy in the East had opposed the Nicene Creed in the decades leading up to Theodosius's accession, he managed to achieve unity on the basis of the Nicene Creed. In 381, at the Second Ecumenical Council in Constantinople, a group of mainly Eastern bishops assembled and accepted the Nicene Creed of 381, which was supplemented in regard to the Holy Spirit, as well as some other changes: see Comparison of Nicene Creeds of 325 and 381. This is generally considered the end of the dispute about the Trinity and the end of Arianism among the Roman, non-Germanic peoples.

== Among late antiquity Germanic tribes ==
The ceiling mosaic of the Arian Baptistery, built in Ravenna by the Ostrogothic King Theodoric the Great

During the time of Arianism's flowering in Constantinople, the Gothic convert and Arian bishop Ulfilas (later the subject of the letter of Auxentius cited above) was sent as a missionary to the Gothic tribes across the Danube, a mission favored for political reasons by the Emperor Constantius II. The Homoians in the Danubian provinces played a major role in the conversion of the Goths to Arianism.

Ulfilas's translation of the Bible into Gothic language and his initial success in converting the Goths to Arianism was strengthened by later events. The conversion of Goths led to a widespread diffusion of Arianism among other Germanic tribes as well, the Vandals, Langobards, Svevi, and Burgundians. When the Germanic peoples entered the provinces of the Western Roman Empire and began founding their own kingdoms there, most of them were Arian Christians.

The conflict in the 4th century had seen Arian and Nicene factions struggling for control of Western Europe. In contrast, among the Arian German kingdoms established in the collapsing Western Empire in the 5th century, there existed entirely separate Arian and Nicene Churches with parallel hierarchies, each serving different sets of believers. The Germanic elites were Arians, and the Romance-majority population was Nicene.

The Arian Germanic tribes were generally tolerant towards Nicene Christians and other religious minorities, including the Jews.

The apparent resurgence of Arianism after Nicaea was more an anti-Nicene reaction exploited by Arian sympathizers than a pro-Arian development. By the end of the 4th century, it had surrendered its remaining ground to Trinitarianism. In Western Europe, Arianism, which had been taught by Ulfilas, the Arian missionary to the Germanic tribes, was dominant among the Goths, Langobards and Vandals. By the 8th century, it had ceased to be the tribes' mainstream belief as the tribal rulers gradually came to adopt Nicene orthodoxy. This trend began in 496 with Clovis I of the Franks, then Reccared I of the Visigoths in 587 and Aripert I of the Lombards in 653.

The Franks and the Anglo-Saxons were unlike the other Germanic peoples in that they entered the Western Roman Empire as Pagans and were converted to Chalcedonian Christianity, led by their kings, Clovis I of the Franks, and Æthelberht of Kent and others in Britain.

The remaining tribes – the Vandals and the Ostrogoths – did not convert to Trinitarianism as a people nor did they maintain territorial cohesion. Having been militarily defeated by the armies of Emperor Justinian I, the remnants were dispersed to the fringes of the empire and became lost to history. The Vandalic War of 533–534 dispersed the defeated Vandals.

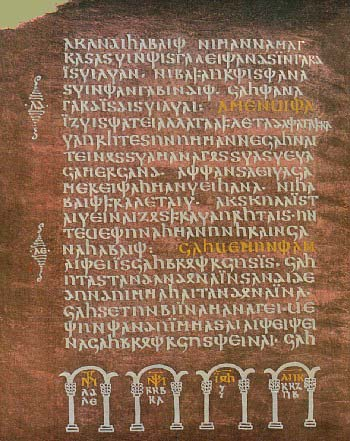
A page from the Codex Argenteus, a 6th-century illuminated manuscript of the Gothic Bible

== From the 5th to the 7th century ==
Arian and Chalcedonian counties in 495. One year before the conversion of the Franks

Much of south-eastern Europe and central Europe, including many of the Goths and Vandals respectively, had embraced Arianism (the Visigoths converted to Arian Christianity in 376 through their bishop Wulfila), which led to Arianism being a religious factor in various wars in the Roman Empire. (Note: The inhibiting and paralyzing force of superstitious beliefs penetrated to every department of life, and the most primary and elementary activities of society were influenced. War, for example, was not a simple matter of a test of strength and courage, but supernatural matters had to be taken carefully into consideration. When Clovis said of the Goths in southern Gaul, 'I take it hard that these Arians should hold a part of the Gauls; let us go with God's aid and conquer them and bring the land under our dominion', [note: see p. 45 (Book II:37)] he was not speaking in a hypocritical or arrogant manner but in real accordance with the religious sentiment of the time. What he meant was that the Goths, being heretics, were at once enemies of the true God and inferior to the orthodox Franks in their supernatural backing. Considerations of duty, strategy, and self-interest all reinforced one another in Clovis's mind. However, it was not always the orthodox side that won. We hear of a battle fought a few years before Gregory became Bishop of Tours between King Sigebert and the Huns, [note: Book IV:29] in which the Huns 'by the use of magic arts caused various false appearances to arise before their enemies and overcame them decisively.)

In the west, organized Arianism survived in North Africa, in Hispania, and parts of Italy until it was suppressed in the 6th and 7th centuries. Visigothic Spain converted to Nicene Christianity through their king Reccared I at the Third Council of Toledo in 589. Grimoald, King of the Lombards (662–671), and his young son and successor Garibald (671), were the last Arian kings in Europe.

== From the 16th to the 19th century ==
Following the Protestant Reformation from 1517, it did not take long for Arian and other nontrinitarian views to resurface. The first recorded English antitrinitarian was John Assheton, who was forced to recant before Thomas Cranmer in 1548. At the Anabaptist Council of Venice 1550, the early Italian instigators of the Radical Reformation committed to the views of Michael Servetus—who was burned alive by the orders of John Calvin in 1553—were promulgated by Giorgio Biandrata and others into Poland and Transylvania.

The anti-Trinitarian wing of the Polish Reformation separated from the Calvinist ecclesia maior to form the ecclesia minor or Polish Brethren. These were commonly referred to as "Arians" due to their rejection of the Trinity, though in fact the Socinians, as they were later known, went further than Arius to the position of Photinus. The epithet "Arian" was also applied to the early Unitarians such as John Biddle; though in denial of the pre-existence of Christ they were again largely Socinians, not Arians.

In 1683, when Anthony Ashley Cooper, 1st Earl of Shaftesbury, lay dying in Amsterdam—driven into exile by his outspoken opposition to King Charles II—he spoke to the minister Robert Ferguson, and professed himself an Arian.

In the 18th century the "dominant trend" in Britain, particularly in Latitudinarianism, was toward Arianism, with which Samuel Clarke, Benjamin Hoadly, William Whiston and Isaac Newton are associated. To quote the Encyclopædia Britannica's article on Arianism: "In modern times some Unitarians are virtually Arians in that they are unwilling either to reduce Christ to a mere human being or to attribute to him a divine nature identical with that of the Father."

== Alleged connection to Islam ==
The belief that Islam is connected or originates out of Arianism, held by some critics of Islam like Robert Spencer, stems from the Christian monk John of Damascus. In his work Concerning Heresies he claims that Muhammad "came into contact with the Old and New Testaments" and was "supposedly acquainted with an Arian monk" after which he formed the "heresy" of Islam. While both Arianism and Islam are Abrahamic religions that reject the trinity of god, they differ in many core aspects of their faith. While, according to Arius, Jesus was a divine being and the son of god, Islam rejects this and claims he was simply a prophet. Islam originated from a religiously polytheistic environment and it does not stem from a distinct lineage and Arianism had no clear influence on it.

== Today ==
Many notable religious groups affirm the conciliar teachings that rejected Arianism, including the Catholic Church, the Eastern Orthodox Church, the Oriental Orthodox Churches, the Assyrian Church of the East, and almost all historic Protestant churches including Lutheran, Reformed, Presbyterian, Continental Reformed, Congregationalist, Anglican, Methodist, Baptist, and Free Evangelical; all entirely reject the teachings associated with Arianism.

Modern groups that currently appear to embrace some of the principles of Arianism include Unitarians and Jehovah's Witnesses. Although the origins of their beliefs are not necessarily attributed to the teachings of Arius, many of the core beliefs of Unitarians and Jehovah's Witnesses are very similar to them.

=== Jehovah's Witnesses ===
Jehovah's Witnesses are often referred to as "modern-day Arians", usually by their opponents, although Jehovah's Witnesses themselves have denied these claims. Significant similarities in doctrine include the identification of the Father as the only true God and of Jesus Christ as the first creation of God and the intermediate agent in the creation of all other things. They also deny the personhood of the Holy Spirit, which some Arians historically affirmed. Jehovah's Witnesses exclusively worship and pray to God the Father, or Jehovah, only through Jesus (the Son) as a mediator.

=== Iglesia ni Cristo ===
Iglesia ni Cristo's Christology has parallels with Arianism in that it affirms that the Father is the only true God, but it denies the preexistence of Christ. Thus, Iglesia ni Cristo is Socinian rather than Arian in its Christology.

=== Other Socinian groups ===
Other Biblical Unitarians such as the Christadelphians and Church of God General Conference are also typically Socinian rather than Arian in their Christology.

=== The Church of Jesus Christ of Latter-day Saints ===
The Church of Jesus Christ of Latter-day Saints (LDS Church) teaches a nontrinitarian theology concerning the nature of the Godhead. Similarities between LDS doctrines and Arianism were alleged as early as 1846. There are a number of key differences between Arianism and Latter-day Saint theology. Whereas Arianism is a unitarian Christian form of classical theism, Latter-day Saint theology is a non-trinitarian (but not unitarian) form of Christianity outside of classical theism. Arianism also teaches that God is eternal, was never a man, and could not incarnate as a man; in contrast, the LDS Church teaches that "God Himself is an exalted man, perfected, enthroned, and supreme."

Whereas Arianism denies that humans can become gods, the LDS Church affirms that humans can become gods through exaltation. Whereas Arianism teaches that the Son was created, the LDS Church also teaches that the Son was procreated as a literal spirit child of the Heavenly Father and the Heavenly Mother and denies any form of creation ex nihilo; the creation of Christ ex nihilo is, in contrast, a fundamental premise of Arianism.

The LDS church, in contrast to the Arian teaching that God is incorporeal, also teaches that God has a tangible body: "The Father has a body of flesh and bones as tangible as man's; the Son also; but the Holy Ghost has not a body of flesh and bones, but is a personage of Spirit. Were it not so, the Holy Ghost could not dwell in us." Arianism traditionally taught that God is incomprehensible even to the Son. In contrast, the LDS Church rejects the doctrine that God is incomprehensible. Though Arianism teaches that Christ is ontologically inferior and subordinate to the Father, the LDS Church teaches that Christ is equal in power and glory with the Father.

The LDS Church teaches that the Father, Son, and Holy Spirit are three separate beings united in purpose: "the Father, the Son and the Holy Spirit (or Holy Ghost) [...] are three physically separate beings, but fully one in love, purpose and will", as illustrated in Jesus' Farewell Prayer, his baptism at the hands of John the Baptist, his transfiguration, and the martyrdom of Stephen. Thus, the church's first Article of Faith states: "We believe in God, the Eternal Father, and in His Son, Jesus Christ, and in the Holy Ghost."

Latter-day Saints believe that the three are collectively "one eternal God" but reject the Nicene definition of the Trinity, that the three are consubstantial. In some respects, Latter-day Saint theology is more similar to social trinitarianism than to Arianism.

=== Spiritism ===
According to the reincarnationist religion of Spiritism started by French educator Allan Kardec in the 19th century, Jesus is the highest-order of spirit that has ever incarnated on Earth and is distinct from God, by whom he was created. Jesus is not considered God or part of God as in Nicene Christianity, but is nonetheless the ultimate model of human love, intelligence, and forgiveness, often cited as the governor of Earth.

== See also ==
- Adoptionism
- Arian controversy
- Arian creeds
- First Council of Nicaea
- Germanic Christianity
- Gothic Bible
- God-man (Christianity)
- History of Unitarianism
- Jehovah's Witnesses
- Monarchianism
- Nontrinitarianism
- Sabellianism
- Socinianism
- Subordinationism
