= Eusebius of Nicomedia =

Arian bishop (died 341)

- Archbishop of Constantinople
- Installed: 339
- Term ended: 341
- Predecessor: Paul I of Constantinople
- Successor: Paul I of Constantinople

Personal details
- Died: 341
- Denomination: Arianism

Eusebius of Nicomedia (/juːˈsiːbiəs/; Ancient Greek: Εὐσέβιος; died 341) was an Arian priest who baptised Constantine the Great on his deathbed in 337. A fifth-century legend evolved that Pope Sylvester I was the one to baptise Constantine, but this is dismissed by scholars as a forgery "to amend the historical memory of the Arian baptism that the emperor received at the end of his life, and instead to attribute an unequivocally orthodox baptism to him". He was a bishop of Berytus (modern-day Beirut) in Phoenicia. He was later made the bishop of Nicomedia, where the Imperial court resided. He lived finally in Constantinople from 338 up to his death.

== Influence in the Imperial family and the Imperial court ==
Distantly related to the imperial family of Constantine the Great, he owed his progression from a less significant Levantine bishopric to the most important episcopal see to his influence at court and the great power he wielded in the church was derived from that source. In fact, during his time in the imperial court, the Eastern court and the major positions in the Eastern Church were held by Arians or Arian sympathizers. With the exception of a short period of eclipse, he enjoyed the confidence both of Constantine and Constantius II. He also served as the tutor of the later Roman emperor Julian, and it was he who might have baptised Constantine the Great on 22 May 337 owing to his familial relationship with the emperor. Also during his time in the imperial court, Arianism became more popular with the royal family. It can be logically surmised that Eusebius had a huge hand in the acceptance of Arianism in the Constantinian household. The Arian influence grew so strong during his tenure in the imperial court that it was not until the end of the Constantinian dynasty and the appointment of Theodosius I that Arianism lost its influence in the empire.

It was of particular interest that Eusebius was nearly persecuted because of his close relationship to the Emperor Licinius while serving as bishop of Nicomedia during Licinius' reign.

== Relationship with Arius ==
Like Arius, he was a pupil of Lucian of Antioch, and it is probable that he held the same views as Arius from the very beginning; he was also one of Arius' most fervent supporters and encourager. It was also because of this relationship that he was the first person whom Arius contacted after the latter was excommunicated from Alexandria by Alexander I of Alexandria in 321. Apparently, Arius and Eusebius were close enough and Eusebius powerful enough that Arius was able to put his theology down in writing. He afterward modified his ideas somewhat, or perhaps he only yielded to the pressure of circumstances; but he was, if not the teacher, at all events the leader and organizer of the Arian council.

At the First Council of Nicaea in 325, he signed the Confession, but only after a long and desperate opposition in which he was said to "subscribe with hand only, not heart" according to ancient sources. It was a huge blow to the Arian party since it was surmised that the participants in the First Council of Nicaea were evenly split between non-Arians and Arians. His defense of Arius angered the emperor, and a few months after the council he was sent into exile due to his continual contacts with Arius and his followers. After the lapse of three years, he succeeded in regaining the imperial favor by convincing Constantine that Arius and his views do not conflict with the proclaimed Nicene Creed. After his return in 329, he brought the whole machinery of the state government into action in order to impose his views upon the Church.

== Political and religious career ==
In complement to his theological interests, Eusebius was a skilled politician. Upon his return, he regained the lost ground resulting from the First Council of Nicaea, established alliances with other groups such as the Melitians and expelled many opponents.

He was described by modern historians as an "ambitious intriguer" and a "consummate political player". He was also described by ancient sources as a high-handed person who was also aggressive in his dealings; he also used his allies to spy on his opponents.

He was able to dislodge and exile three key opponents who espoused the First Council of Nicaea: Eustathius of Antioch in 330, Athanasius of Alexandria in 335 and Marcellus of Ancyra in 336. This was no small feat since Athanasius was regarded as a "man of God" by Constantine, and both Eustathius and Athanasius held top positions in the church.

Another major feat was his appointment as the Patriarch of Constantinople by expelling Paul I of Constantinople; Paul I would eventually return as Patriarch after Eusebius's death.

Even outside the empire, Eusebius had great influence. He brought Ulfilas into the Arian priesthood and sent the latter to convert the heathen Goths.

Eusebius baptised Constantine the Great in his villa in Nicomedia, on 22 May 337 just before the death of the Emperor.

== Death and aftermath ==
He died at the height of his power in the year 341.

He was so influential that even after his death, Constantius II heeded his and Eudoxus of Constantinople's advice to attempt to convert the Roman Empire to Arianism by creating Arian Councils and official Arian Doctrines.

It was because of Eusebius that "On the whole, Constantine and his successors made life pretty miserable for Church leaders committed to the Nicene decision and its Trinitarian formula".

Eusebius of Nicomedia is not to be confused with his contemporary Eusebius of Caesarea, the author of well-known early books of Church history.

== See also ==
- Synod of Gangra

== Bibliography ==
- Amidon, Philip R. (1997). The Church History of Rufinus of Aquileia: Books 10 and 11. New York: Oxford University Press.
- Bright, William (1970). The Age of the Fathers. New York: AMS Press.
- Canella, Tessa (2018). "Sylvester I". Brill Encyclopedia of Early Christianity.
- Chadwick, Henry (2003). The Church in Ancient Society: From Galilee to Gregory the Great. Oxford: Oxford University Press.
- Chadwick, Henry (1993). The Early Church. London: Penguin Group.
- Drake, H.A. (2000). Constantine and the Bishops: The Politics of intolerance. Baltimore: Johns Hopkins University Press.
- Ellingsen, Mark (1999). Reclaiming Our Roots: An Inclusive Introduction to Church History, Vol. I, The Late First Century to the Eve of the Reformation. Pennsylvania: Trinity Press International.
- Guitton, Jean (1963). Great Heresies and Church councils. New York: Harper & Row Publishers.
- Jones, A.H.M. (1978). Constantine and the Conversion of Europe. Toronto: University of Toronto Press. ISBN 9780802063694.
- Lim, Richard (1995). Public Disputation, power, and social order in late antiquity. Berkeley: University of California Press.
- Loomis, Louise Ropes (1916). The book of the popes (Liber pontificalis). Internet Archive: Columbia University Press.
- Roldanus, Johannes (2006). The Church in the Age of Constantine: the Theological Challenges. Oxfordshire: Routledge.
- Young, Frances (1983). From Nicaea to Chalcedon. Philadelphia: Fortress Press.

Titles of the Great Christian Church
Preceded by Paul I	Archbishop of Constantinople; 339 – 341	Succeeded by Paul I
