= Lucian of Antioch =

Christian martyr, presbyter and theologian

Saint Lucian of Antioch
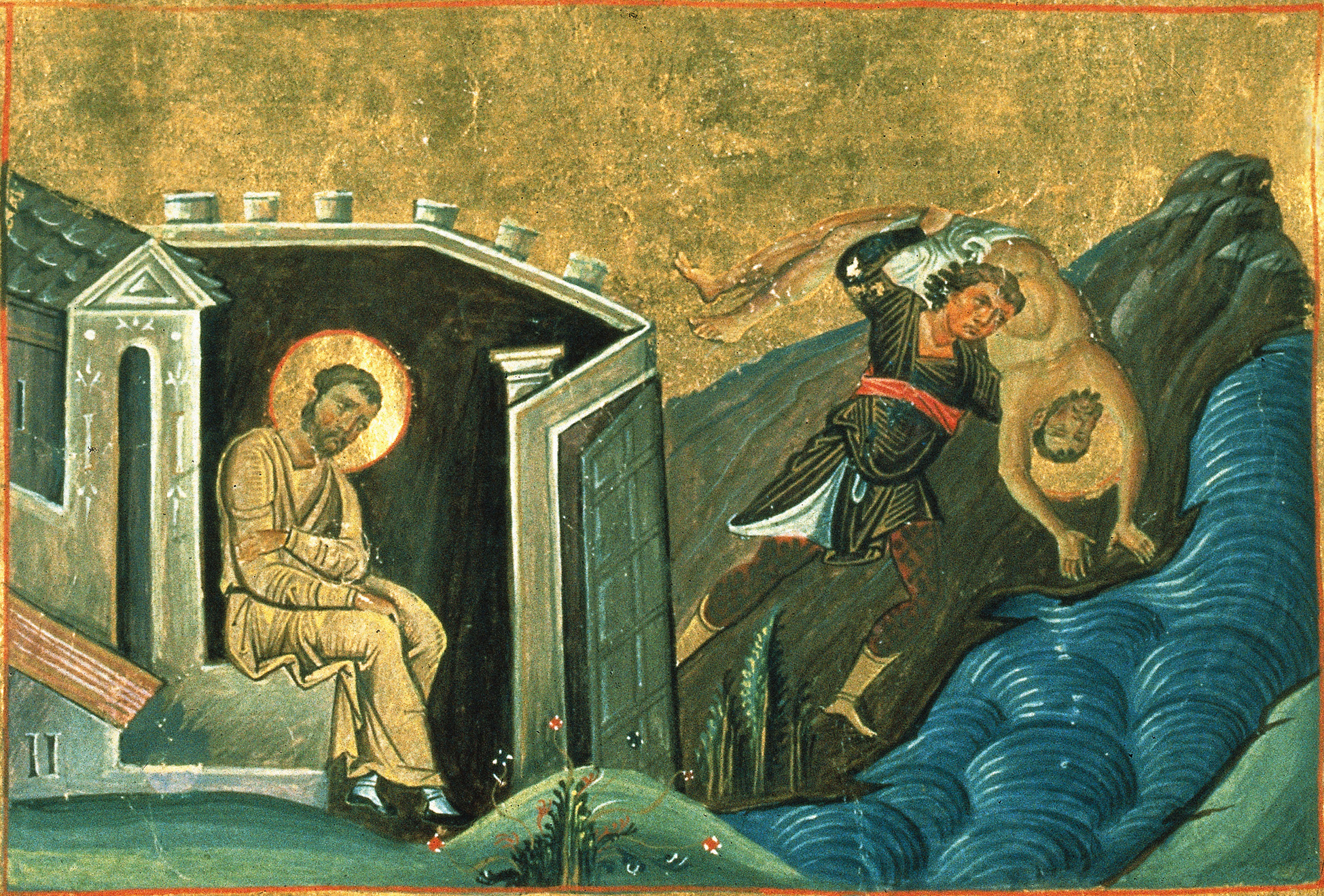
- Miniature from the Menologion of Basil II
- Born: c. 240; Traditionally Samosata (now Samsat, Adıyaman, Turkey)
- Died: January 7, 312; Possibly Nicomedia (modern-day Izmit, Kocaeli, Turkey)
- Venerated in: Eastern Orthodox Church; Roman Catholic Church; Armenian Apostolic Church
- Feast: January 7 (Roman Catholic); October 15 (Byzantine Christianity); Monday after fifth Sunday after Pentecost (Armenian Apostolic Church)

Lucian of Antioch (Greek: Λουκιανός Αντιοχείας c. 240 – January 7, 312), (Note: January 7 was the calendar day on which his memory was celebrated at Antioch.) known as Lucian the Martyr, was a Christian presbyter, theologian, and martyr. He was noted for both his scholarship and ascetic piety.

== History ==
According to Suidas, Lucian was born at Samosata, Kommagene, Syria, to Christian parents, and was educated in the neighbouring city of Edessa, Mesopotamia, at the school of Macarius. However, this tradition might be due to a conflation with his famous namesake, Lucian of Samosata, the pagan satirist of the second century.

At Antioch, Lucian was ordained presbyter. Eusebius of Caesarea notes his theological learning and Lucian's vita (composed after 327) reports that he founded a Didaskaleion, a school. Scholars following Adolf von Harnack see him as the first head of the School of Antioch, with links to later theologians Diodorus of Tarsus and Theodore of Mopsuestia, but that contention is unrecorded in the extant sources.

After the deposition of Antioch's bishop Paul of Samosata, he fell under suspicion for heresy, and was excommunicated. According to Alexander of Alexandria, he remained in schism during the episcopates of three bishops, Domnus, Timaeus and Cyril, whose administration extended from 268 to 303. Lucian was reconciled with the Church either early in the episcopate of Cyril (perhaps about 285), which seems more likely, or under Cyril's successor Tyrannus.

During the persecution of Maximinus Daia, Lucian was arrested at Antioch and sent to Nicomedia, where he endured many tortures over nine months of imprisonment. He was twice brought up for examination, and both times defended himself ably and refused to renounce his Christian faith.

His death is uncertain. He might have been starved to death. Another, more likely, possibility is that he was beheaded. The traditional date ascribed to his execution is January 7, 312, in Nicomedia. There is a late tradition of uncertain origin that he had been drowned in the sea and that his body was returned to land by a dolphin.

He was buried at Drepanum on the Gulf of Nicomedia, which was later renamed Helenopolis to honour Helena, mother of Constantine the Great.

He is also commemorated as a saint, with a feast day of January 7 in the Roman Catholic Church and October 15 in the Orthodox Church.

== Theology ==
Lucian's theological position is a matter of contention. Attempts to reconstruct his theology from the extant sources have led to contradictory results.

Because Arius in a letter addressed Eusebius of Nicomedia as "sylloukianistes" ("Fellow-Lucianist"), Lucian's theology came to be associated with the Arian controversy. Following Adolf von Harnack, many scholars have interpreted the word (which only appears in this instance) as denoting a theological school and have therefore seen not only Eusebius but also Arius and other Arian leaders (among them Maris, Theognis of Nicaea and Asterius) as pupils of Lucian and have transferred Arian views unto Lucian. The first writer to clearly attest such a discipleship for a number of Arian sympathisers—but not for Arius and his closer associates—was the Anomoean church historian Philostorgius.

Others have interpreted the word as indicating not a theological link but the special veneration accorded to Lucian by Eusebius, who by that time headed the church of Nicomedia, the place of Lucian's martyrdom. Lucian's veneration increased during the latter half of Constantine's reign, in particular due to the patronage of the Empress Helena.

Opponents of Arianism, such as Alexander of Alexandria, countered this veneration by noting Lucian's schismatic past. Marius Victorinus identified the Eusebian party with Lucian. Epiphanius associates Lucian with heretical views about Christ's human soul held by Arians (but also by others) and relates that the Arians venerated Lucian as their martyr and that Lucian lived together with Eusebius at Nicomedia.

Associated with Lucian's name is also the Creed of the Dedication passed at the Council of Antioch in 341. This association is unknown to Athanasius of Alexandria and Hilarius of Poitiers, but known and accepted by later writers. It was most likely brought up by the Homoiousian party. In their opposition against the Homoian party supported by Emperor Constantius II, the Homoiousians claimed the legacy of Lucian and adopted the definition of 341 as their creed.

Other attempts to reconstruct Lucian's theology have started out with Paul of Samosata, whose rejection of the allegorizing tendencies of the Alexandrian School, and especially those of Origen, was transferred to Lucian.

Because these identifications created a contradictory picture of Lucian, some scholars have proposed the existence of two Lucians, the first being a follower of Paul of Samosata, the second being Lucian the martyr, a theologian in the Origenist tradition and the teacher of Arius and Eusebius of Nicomedia. However, this proposal has now been largely rejected.

Whatever his theology had been, his status as a martyr and a saint was not impacted by concerns of orthodoxy. In the words of Philip Schaff: "The contradictory reports are easily reconciled by the assumption that Lucian was a critical scholar with some peculiar views on the Trinity and Christology which were not in harmony with the later Nicene orthodoxy, but that he wiped out all stains by his heroic confession and martyrdom".

== Biblical text ==
The inter-relationship between various significant ancient manuscripts of the Old Testament. LXX denotes the original Septuagint.

Lucian is credited with a critical recension of the text of the Septuagint and the Greek New Testament. The resulting manuscript was popular in Syria, Asia Minor, and Constantinople and was later used by Chrysostom and the later Greek fathers, and which lies at the basis of the textus receptus. However, Lucian took it upon himself to "fix" the manuscripts he received, saying he was correcting errors that had sneaked in over time. He undertook to revise the Septuagint based on the original Hebrew. For this, he received criticism. Jerome mentions that copies of his work on the Greek Old Testament were known in his day as "exemplaria Lucianea" but in other places he speaks rather disparagingly of the texts of Lucian. Jerome also wrote: "This (Testament) certainly differs in our language, and is led in the way of different streams; it is necessary to seek the single fountainhead. I pass over those books which are called by the name of Lucian and Hesychius, for which a few men wrongly claim authority, who anyway were not allowed to revise either in the Old Instrument after the Seventy Translators, or to pour out revisions in the New; with the Scriptures previously translated into the languages of many nations, the additions may now be shown to be false." In the absence of definite information it is impossible to decide the merits of Lucian's critical labors. The 6th century Gelasian Decree, a work of the Latin Western Church rather than the Greek Eastern Church where Lucian's work was more popular, contains a list of apocryphal books "to be avoided by Catholics" that includes "the Gospels which Lucianus forged." Modern scholars mark Lucianic rescensions with an L, to indicate that when variant readings arise, they may have been from Lucian's adjustments.

Lucian integrated a number of important minuscule manuscripts of 3 Maccabees.

== Sources ==
- Theologische Realenzyklopädie, p. 479, at Google Books.
- Philip Schaff and Henry Wace, Nicene and Post-Nicene Fathers vol. III, ch LXXVII
- Schaff, Philip, History of the Christian Church, Volume II: "Ante-Nicene Christianity. A.D. 100-325" Contains bibliography.
- Attwater, Donald and Catherine Rachel John. The Penguin Dictionary of Saints. 3rd edition. New York: Penguin Books, 1993. ISBN 0-14-051312-4.
- Royden Yerkes, The Lucianic version of the Old Testament as illustrated from Jeremiah 1-3 (dissertation, University of Pennsylvania, 1918)
