= Arian controversy =

Series of Christian disputes

The Arian controversy was a series of Christian disputes about the nature of Christ. It was the greatest internal struggle the Christian Church had so far experienced, and led to the acceptance of the Trinity doctrine, the church’s most fundamental doctrine.

It began in 318 as a dispute between Bishop Alexander of Alexandria and a priest in his diocese named Arius, both Christian theologians from Alexandria, Egypt.

The most important of these controversies concerned the relationship between the substance of God the Father and the substance of His Son. Arius argued that the Son of God did not always exist and that His substance is different from the Father's. This conflicted with the view advanced by Alexander, and later also by Athanasius, who argued that the Christ is coeternal and consubstantial (of the same substance) with God the Father.

Emperor Constantine, through the Council of Nicaea in 325, attempted to unite Christianity and establish a single, imperially approved version of the faith. Ironically, his efforts were the cause of the deep divisions created by the disputes after Nicaea. In the decade after Nicaea, the deposed Arians were readmitted to communion, and all the leading supporters of the Nicene Creed were deposed, disgraced, or exiled.

While there was no formal schism, these disagreements divided the Church into various factions for over 55 years, from the time before the First Council of Nicaea in 325 until after the First Council of Constantinople in 381.

Inside the Roman Empire, the Trinitarian faction ultimately gained the upper hand through the Edict of Thessalonica, issued on 27 February AD 380, which made Nicene Christology the state religion of the Roman Empire, and through strict enforcement of that edict. However, outside the Roman Empire, Arianism and other forms of Unitarianism continued to be preached for some time (without the blessing of the Empire), but it was eventually killed off. The modern Roman Catholic Church and the Eastern Orthodox Church, as well as all Protestant denominations, have generally followed the Trinitarian formulation, though each has its own specific theology on the matter.

== History ==
=== Beginnings ===
The early history of the controversy must be pieced together from about 35 documents found in various sources. Christians in the first two decades of the fourth century had to concern themselves first of all with survival, in the face of what was perhaps the only systematic attempt ever, on the part of the Roman government, to destroy the Christian Church. Roman persecution of Christians was brought to an end by Galerius’ Edict of Toleration in 311, followed by Constantine’s Edict of Milan in 313.

The 4th-century Controversy continued the controversies of the previous centuries. Following Justin Martyr in the second century, Logos-theology dominated, but was opposed by Monarchianism. In the 3rd century, authors like Sabellius, Tertullian, and Origen made significant but conflicting contributions to the debate over the nature of Christ.

Around the year 260, some Sabellians in Libya used the term homoousios (consubstantial) to say that the Father and Son are one substance. In a letter, the bishop of Alexandria opposed them and denied the term. The Sabellians appealed to the bishop of Rome. Rome reprimanded Alexandria in a letter, after which Alexandria accepted the term, but as meaning that the Father and Son are two Beings of similar substance, rather than one substance.

The Trinitarian historian Socrates of Constantinople reports that Arius first became controversial under the bishop Alexander of Alexandria, when Arius formulated the following syllogism:

"If the Father begat the Son, he that was begotten had a beginning of existence: hence it is that there was when the Son was not. It follows then of necessity that he had his existence from the non-existence".

The dispute between Arius and Alexander was a continuation of a dispute between two preexisting theological traditions. Arius defended what he regarded as the Alexandrian tradition. Bishop Alexander of Alexandria was criticised for his slow reaction against Arius. Like his predecessor, Dionysius, he has been charged with vacillation. According to Eusebius's work, The Life of Constantine, the controversy had spread from Alexandria into almost all the African regions, and was considered a disturbance of the public order by the Roman Empire. Constantine the Great (Constantine I) sent two letters to Arius and Bishop Alexander, asking the religious leaders to stop the controversy. The ongoing controversy led to Constantine's oversight of the First Council of Nicaea.

== First Council of Nicaea (325) ==
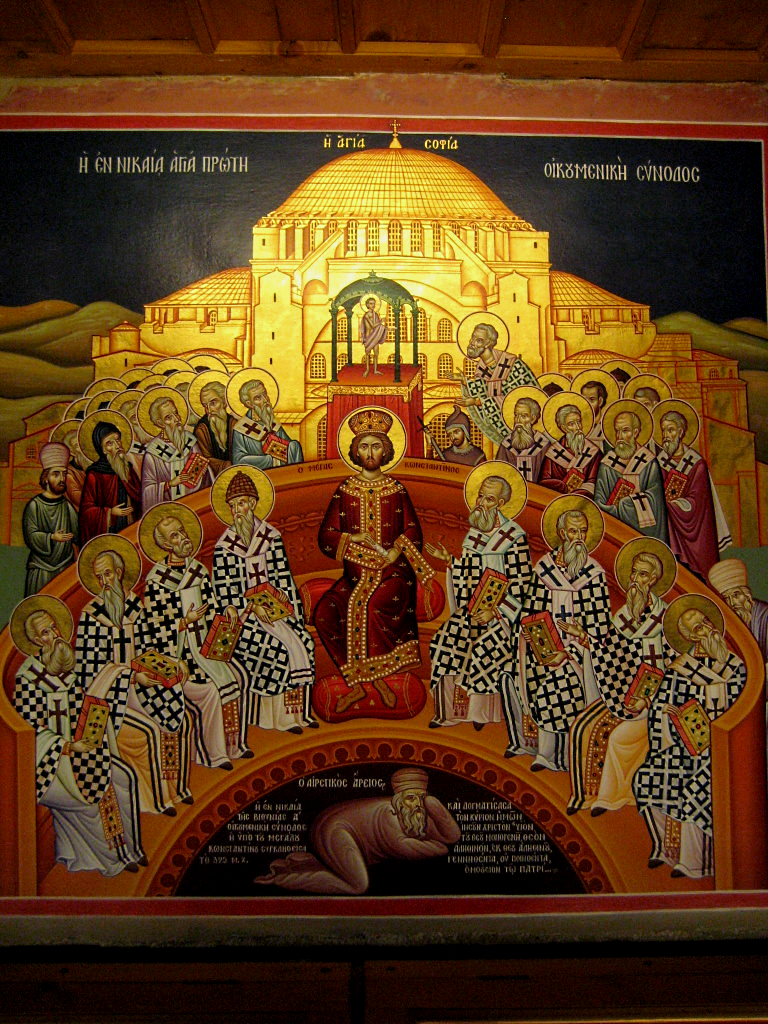
The First Council of Nicaea, with Arius depicted beneath the feet of emperor Constantine the Great and the bishops

Arianism would not be contained within the Alexandrian diocese. By the time Bishop Alexander finally acted against his presbyter, Arius's doctrine had spread far beyond his own see; it had become a topic of discussion—and disturbance—for the entire Church.

The Church was now a powerful force in the Roman world, with Constantine I having legalized it in 313 through the Edict of Milan. "Constantine desired that the church should contribute to the social and moral strength of the empire, religious dissension was a menace to the public welfare." Consequently, the emperor had taken a personal interest in several ecumenical issues, including the Donatist controversy in 316. He also wanted to bring an end to the Arian dispute.

To this end, the emperor sent bishop Hosius of Corduba to investigate and, if possible, resolve the controversy. Hosius was armed with an open letter from the Emperor: "Wherefore let each one of you, showing consideration for the other, listen to the impartial exhortation of your fellow-servant." As the debate continued to rage despite Hosius' efforts, Constantine in AD 325 took an unprecedented step: he called an ecumenical council at Nicaea composed of church prelates from all parts of the empire to resolve this issue, possibly at Hosius' recommendation. It is traditionally said that 318 bishops came to Nicaea to attend the council, though others suggest figures from 250-300. The vast majority of those bishops were from the East. Italy, Spain, Gaul, North Africa, Persia, and Scythia each sent one bishop.

Pope Sylvester I, himself too aged to attend, sent two priests as his delegates. Arius himself attended the council as well as the young deacon Athanasius, who attended as an assistant to Alexander of Alexandria and who would become the champion of the Nicene Creed and spend most of his life battling Arianism and other forms of Unitarianism. Also there were Eusebius of Caesarea and Eusebius of Nicomedia. Before the main conclave convened, Hosius initially met with Alexander and his supporters at Nicomedia. The council was presided over by the emperor himself, who participated in and even led some of its discussions.

Athanasius was present at the Council but did not play an active part. Those who upheld the notion that Christ was co-eternal and con-substantial with the Father were led by Alexander. Those who instead insisted that the Son of God came after God the Father in time and substance, were led by Arius the presbyter. For about two months, the two sides argued and debated, with each appealing to Scripture to justify their respective positions. Arius maintained that the Son of God was a Creature, made from nothing; and that he was God's First Production, before all ages. And he argued that everything else was created through the Son. Thus, said Arius, only the Son was directly created and begotten of God; furthermore, there was a time that He had no existence. He was capable of His own free will, said Arius, and thus "were He in the truest sense a son, He must have come after the Father, therefore the time obviously was when He was not, and hence He was a finite being."

According to some accounts in the hagiography of Saint Nicholas, debate at the council became so heated that at one point, he slapped Arius in the face. The majority of the bishops at the council ultimately agreed upon a creed, known thereafter as the Nicene Creed formulated at the first council of Nicaea. It included the word homoousios, meaning "consubstantial", or "same in essence", which was incompatible with Arius' beliefs. On June 19, 325, council and emperor issued a circular to the churches in and around Alexandria: Arius and two of his unyielding partisans (Theonas and Secundus) were deposed and exiled to Illyricum, while three other supporters—Theognis of Nicaea, Eusebius of Nicomedia and Maris of Chalcedon—affixed their signatures solely out of deference to the emperor. However, Constantine soon found reason to suspect the sincerity of these three, for he later included them in the sentence pronounced on Arius.

=== Ariminum, Seleucia, and Constantinople (358–360) ===
In 358, the emperor Constantius II requested two councils, one of the western bishops at Ariminum (now Rimini in Northern Italy) and one of the eastern bishops at Nicomedia.

In 359, the western council met at Ariminum. Ursacius of Singidunum and Valens of Mursa, following the new creed drafted at Sirmium (359), proposed that, "according to the scriptures," the Son was "like the Father." This is known as the Homoian view which held that the Bible does not reveal whether the Son is of the same substance as the Father and we, therefore, should not speculate about such things. This view is in opposition to the "of the same substance" (Homoousios) view of the Nicene Creed. The council, including some supporters of the older creed, accepted this proposal. After the council, Pope Liberius condemned the creed of Ariminum, while his rival, Pope Felix II, supported it.

An earthquake struck Nicomedia, and in 359 the eastern council met at Seleucia Isauria instead. The council was bitterly divided and procedurally irregular, and the two parties met separately and reached opposing decisions. Following the Homoian view, Acacius of Caesarea declared that the Son was "like the Father". But Basil of Ancyra and his party, following a (Homoiousian) Creed of Antioch from 341, declared that the Son was of "similar substance" to the Father. The majority at Seleucia accepted the "similar substance" view and deposed the opposing party.

Constantius did not accept this outcome and requested a third council, at Constantinople (359), of both the eastern and western bishops, to resolve the split at Seleucia. Acacius and Basil of Ancyra, respectively, again proposed the "like the Father" and "similar substance" views, as were explained at Seleucia. However, Maris of Chalcedon, Eudoxius of Antioch, and the deacons Aëtius of Antioch and Eunomius of Cyzicus proposed a third view which was similar to Arius' teachings, namely that the Son was of "a dissimilar substance" from the Father. The Heteroousians ("dissimilar substance") won the victory over the other two views in an initial debate. However, Constantius was not willing to accept this outcome either. He intervened and banished Aëtius; one of the leading proponents of the "dissimilar substance" view. After this, the council, including Maris and Eudoxius, agreed to a fourth view, namely the homoian ("like the Father") view that was already agreed to at Ariminum. They made only minor modifications to the Ariminum creed.

After the Council of Constantinople, the homoian bishop Acacius deposed and banished several homoiousian bishops, including Macedonius I of Constantinople, Basil, Eustathius, Eleusius of Cyzicus, Dracontius of Pergamum, Neonas of Seleucia, Sophronius of Pompeiopolis, Elpidius of Satala and Cyril of Jerusalem. At the same time, Acacius also deposed and banished the Anomoean deacon Aëtius.

In 360, Acacius appointed Eudoxius of Antioch to replace Macedonius and Athanasius of Ancyra to replace Basil, as well as Onesimus of Nicomedia to replace Cecropius, who had died in the earthquake at Nicomedia.

=== The controversy in the 360s ===
In 361, Constantius died and Julian became sole Roman emperor. Julian demanded the restoration of several pagan temples which Christians had seized or destroyed. According to Philostorgius, pagans killed George of Laodicea, bishop of Alexandria, allowing Athanasius to reclaim the 'see', or ecclesiastical jurisdiction.

== Sides ==
=== Historiography and the term "Arianism" ===
Modern patristic scholarship—notably the works of R.P.C. Hanson, Rowan Williams, and Lewis Ayres—has heavily critiqued the traditional framework of the fourth-century crisis. Scholars argue that labeling the entire sixty-two-year dispute the "Arian Controversy" is a historical misnomer that obscures the period's complex, diverse theological trajectories.

Rather than a movement inspired by a single innovator, historians emphasize that deep theological fissures were already present at the dawn of the fourth century. As Lewis Ayres notes, the controversy was less about Arius's novel ideas and more about the intensification of pre-existing tensions. Within this context, scholars view Arius not as a radical revolutionary, but as a conservative Alexandrian rooted in a broader theological stream—often referred to by modern scholars as the "Eusebian" trajectory.

Furthermore, historians emphasize that there was no single, coherent "anti-Nicene" or "Arian" party loyal to Arius as an individual theologian. Figures who rejected the Nicene Creed held diverse beliefs and frequently appealed to other historical authorities rather than Arius himself.

Consequently, scholars argue that the concept of a unified "Arian" system was largely a polemical construct popularized by opponents of the anti-Nicene coalition, above all Athanasius of Alexandria. Because the traditional label can mislead modern readers into seeing a monolithic movement, some contemporary scholars—such as Lewis Ayres—refrain from using "Arian" to describe the broader anti-Nicene coalitions, reserving it strictly for Arius's specific teachings.

=== Homoousian ===
The Homoousians taught that the Son is of the same substance as the Father, i.e. both uncreated. The Sabellian form had been condemned as heresy in the 3rd century by Pope Calixtus. The use of the term Homoousios was also condemned by a council in Antioch. Nicene theology evolved over the 4th century. Original Nicene theology focused on the unity of God. Only during the 360s did some Nicenes begin to distinguish what in God is one from what is three. Homoousios would be declared orthodox at the Second Ecumenical Council in Constantinople in 381, and has become the basis of most of modern trinitarianism.

- Alexander, bishop of Alexandria (313-326).
- Hosius, bishop of Cordoba (?-359).
- Eusebius, bishop of Caesarea (c. 313-339).
- Eustathius, (possibly Sabellian) bishop of Antioch (c. 325-330).
- Cyrus, (possibly Sabellian) bishop of Beroe.
- Athanasius (Athanasian) bishop of Alexandria (326-373, later rival of Gregory of Cappadocia and then George of Laodicea).
- Paul, bishop of Constantinople (336-351, later rival of Eusebius of Nicomedia and then Macedonius I of Constantinople).
- Julius, bishop of Rome (337-352).
- Asclepas, bishop of Gaza.
- Lucius, bishop of Adrianople (?-351).
- Maximus, bishop of Jerusalem (333-350).
- Paulinus, bishop of Treves, who supported Athanasius of Alexandria at Milan.
- Dionysius, bishop of Alba, who supported Athanasius of Alexandria at Milan.
- Eusebius, bishop of Vercelli (340-371), who supported Athanasius of Alexandria at Milan.
- Angelius, (Novatian) bishop of Constantinople.
- Gregory of Nazianzus
- Gregory of Elvira
- Lucifer, bishop of Cagliari.
- Hilary, bishop of Poitiers (c. 353-367).
- Servatius, bishop of Tongeren.

=== Marcellus of Ancyra and Photinus of Sirmium ===
According to the historian Socrates of Constantinople, in the 4th century, Marcellus of Ancyra and Photinus taught "that Christ was a mere man." Their opponents associated their teachings with those of Sabellius and Paul of Samosata in the 3rd century, which had been widely rejected before the controversy. Another prominent 'Sabellian' in the 4th century was Eustathius.

- Marcellus, bishop of Ancyra (?-336 and c. 343-c. 374) and critic of Asterius.
- Photinus, bishop of Sirmium (?-351) and in exile (351-376); according to Socrates of Constantinople and Sozomen, Photinus was a follower of Marcellus.
- In 336, a church trial at Constantinople deposed Marcellus and condemned his doctrines.
- Pope Julius I supported Marcellus and called for his restoration.
- In 342 or 343, the mostly Western Council of Sardica restored Marcellus, while the mostly Eastern Council of Philippopolis sustained his removal.
- Under pressure from his co-Emperor Constans, Constantius II initially backed the decision of Sardica, but after Constans' death, reversed course.
- In 351, a church trial at the Second Council of Sirmium deposed Photinus and condemned his teachings.
- The Macrostich condemned the teachings of Marcellus and Photinus.

=== Homoiousian ===
The Homoiousian school taught that the Son is of a similar substance to the Father but not the same. Basil of Caesarea, the first of the three Cappadocian Fathers, began his career as a Homoiousian.

- Basil of Ancyra, bishop of Ancyra (336-360).
- Macedonius, (Macedonian) bishop of Constantinople (342-346 and 351-360).
- George of Laodicea, bishop of Alexandria (356-361, rival of Athanasius of Alexandria).
- Eudoxius, bishop of Germanicia (?-358), Antioch (358-359), and Constantinople (360-370), who supported the Macrostich.
- Martyrius, who supported the Macrostich.
- Macedonius, bishop of Mopsuestia, who supported the Macrostich.
- Mark, bishop of Arethusa, who wrote the Creed of Sirmium of 351.
- Cyril, (Macedonian) bishop of Jerusalem (350-386).
- Marathonius, (Macedonian) bishop of Nicomedia (c. 351-?).
- Eleusius, (Macedonian) bishop of Cyzicus (c. 351-360).
- Sophronius, (Macedonian) bishop of Pompeiopolis (?-360).
- Dracontius, bishop of Pergamum (?-360).
- Neonas, bishop of Seleucia Isauria (?-360).
- Elpidius, bishop of Satala (?-360).
- Eustathius, (Macedonian) bishop of Sebastia.
- Annianus of Antioch.
- Sabinus, Macedonian bishop of Heraclea.

=== Homoian ===
The Homoians taught that the Son is similar to the Father, either "in all things" or "according to the scriptures," without speaking of substance. Several members of the other schools, such as Hosius of Cordoba and Aëtius, also accepted certain Homoian formulae. In the 5th century, Germanic immigrants defeated the Roman army, sacked Rome, and deposed the last Western Roman emperor. Most of them were Homoian Christians.

- Ursacius, initially homoiousian, then homoousian, and later homoian bishop of Singidunum, who had opposed Athanasius.
- Valens, initially homoiousian, then homoousian, and later homoian bishop of Mursa, who had opposed Athanasius.
- Germinius.
- Auxentius (died 374), bishop of Milan.
- Demophilus, bishop of Beraea (?-370) and Constantinople (370-380).
- Gaius.
- Acacius, bishop of Caesarea (340-366).

=== Heteroousian ===
The Heteroousians taught that the Son is of a different substance from the Father, i.e. created. Arius had taught this early in the controversy, and Aëtius would teach the later Anomoean form.

- Arius, presbyter in Alexandria.
- Theophilus the Indian, who later supported Aëtius.
- Aëtius, who founded the Anomoean tradition, later bishop (361-?).
- Theodulus, (Anomoean) bishop of Chaeretapa (?-c. 363) and Palestine (c. 363-c. 379).
- Eunomius, (Anomoean) bishop of Cyzicus (360-361) and exiled bishop (361-c. 393).
- Paemenius, (Anomoean) bishop of Constantinople, (c. 363, at the same time as Eudoxius of Antioch).
- Candidus, (Anomoean) bishop of Lydia, (c. 363-?).
- Arrianus, (Anomoean) bishop of Ionia, (c. 363-?).
- Florentius, (Anomoean) bishop of Constantinople, (c. 363-?, at the same time as Eudoxius of Antioch).
- Thallus, (Anomoean) bishop of Lesbos, (c. 363-?, at the same time as Eudoxius of Antioch).
- Euphronius, (Anomoean) bishop of Galatia, the Black Sea and Cappadocia, (c. 363-?).
- Julian, (Anomoean) bishop of Cilicia, (c. 363-?).
- Serras, Stephen, and Heliodorus, (Anomoean) bishops of Egypt, (c. 363-?).
- Philostorgius, (Anomoean) historian.

=== Other critics of the Creed of Nicaea ===
Many critics of the "Nicene" Creed cannot be clearly associated with one school, often due to lack of sources, or due to contradictions between sources.

- Secundus, bishop of Ptolemais, who supported Arius at Nicaea.
- Theonus, bishop of Marmarica, who supported Arius at Nicaea.
- Eusebius, bishop of Berytus, Nicomedia (?-325 and 328-338) and Constantinople (338-341, rival of Paul I of Constantinople), who supported Arius at Nicaea.
- Theognis, bishop of Nicaea, who supported Arius at Nicaea.
- Maris, bishop of Chalcedon, who supported Arius at Nicaea.
- Eusebius, (possibly Homoiousian, possibly Sabellian) bishop of Emesa (c. 339 or 341).
- Gregory of Cappadocia, bishop of Alexandria (339-346, rival of Athanasius of Alexandria).
- Narcissus, bishop of Neronias.
- Stephanus, bishop of Antioch (342-344).
- Leontius, bishop of Antioch (344-358), who also taught Aetius.
- Patrophilus of Scythopolis.
- Asterius (d. c. 341), who, according to Socrates of Constantinople, considered Jesus as example of the power of God, and according to Philostorgius, defended the Homoiousian tradition.
- Athanasius of Anazarbus, who taught Aëtius.
- Wulfila (died 383), first bishop of the Goths (341?-c.383), and Bible translator, who agreed to the Homoian formula at Constantinople.
- Wereka and Batwin, papa and bilaifs respectively, and Gothic martyrs.
- Auxentius of Durostorum, later bishop of Milan, Wulfila's adopted son.
- Palladius, bishop of Ratiaria.
- Secundianus, bishop of Singidunum.

=== Unclassified ===
- Euzoius, deacon and supporter of Arius; later Homoian bishop of Antioch (361-378, at the same time as three others).
- Dorotheus or Theodorus, Homoiousian and later Homoian bishop of Heraclea (?-378) and Antioch, (378-381, at the same time as three others).
- Uranius, bishop of Tyre.
- Onesimus, bishop of Nicomedia (359-?).
- Athanasius, bishop of Ancyra (359-?, at the same time as Basil of Ancyra).
- Acacius, bishop of Tarsus (359-?, at the same time as Silvanus of Tarsus).
- Silvanus, bishop of Tarsus.
- Hypatius of Cyrus, bishop of Nicaea (?-380).
- Leontius, bishop of Tripolis.
- Theodosius, a bishop of Philadelphia in Lydia.
- John, Anomean bishop of Palestine (c. 379-?).
- Evagrius, bishop of Mytelene.
- Asterius, presbyter in Antioch, possibly the same as an Asterius who supported Acacius at Seleucia.

== See also ==
- Christian views of Jesus
- Constantinian shift
- History of Christianity
- Nontrinitarianism
- Semi-Arianism
- Shituf
