= Diocese of Laodicea in Phrygia =

Roman Catholic titular see

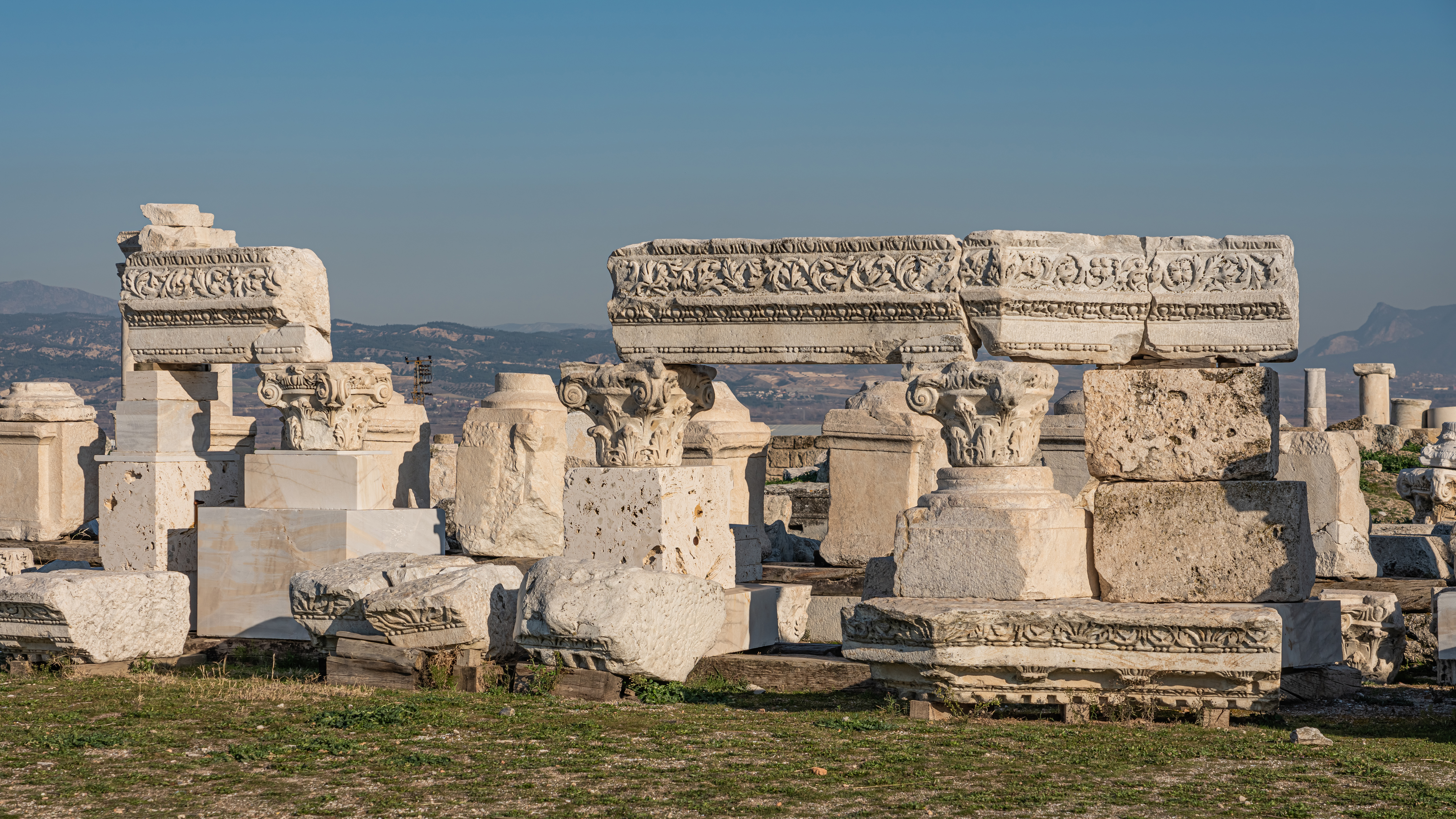
Remains of Laodicea in Phrygia

The Diocese of Laodicea in Phrygia, is an important titular diocese, centered on the biblical city of Laodicea on the Lycus in modern Turkey. The Church at Laodicea was a centre of Christianity from a very early point. The New Testament indicates a Christian presence in Laodicea as early as the AD 50s. The church is mentioned extensively in the epistle to the Colossians, and the First Epistle to Timothy may have been written here. Further, the church was one of the Seven churches of Asia. A bishop was appointed in Apostolic Times, with numerous suffragan bishops attached.

== Residential bishops ==
- Archippus, of the Bible.
- Nymphas.
- Diotrephes
- Sagaris, martyr (c. 166).
- Sagar of Laodicea c175
- Sisinnius
- Diodorus of Laodicea 303/04
- Nunechius I, Council of Nicaea (325)
- Eugenius
- Theodotus 334
- Cecropius of Nicomedia (350). There are 14 named Bishops after Cecropius in the Notitiae Episcopatuum.
- Nonnus of Laodicea 343AD succeeded Cecropius
- Nymphas 300s???
- Aristonicus 381
- Apollinaris of Laodicea 390
- Paul 431
- Nunechius 449
- Messalinus of Laodicea 451
- Nunechius II 458
- John
- Kyriarcus 500s???
- Theodorus of Laodicea 553
- Tyberius
- Eustathius
- Theodorus II 870
- Sisinnius II
- Paulus
- Simeon
- Michael 1082

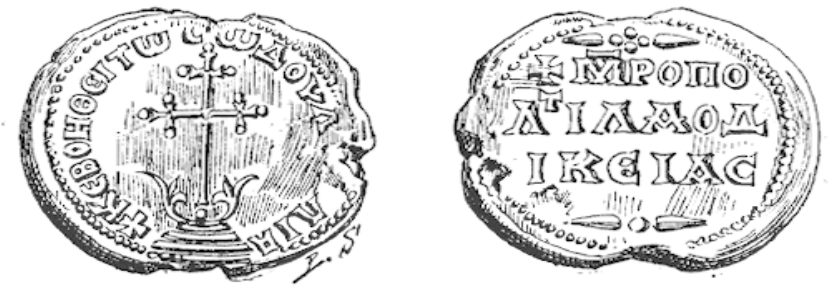
Seal of Elias, Metropolitan of Laodicea

- Unknown bishop at Synod of Constantinople 1140
- Gerard, bishop of Laodicea 1159.
- Basilius
- Theophylact 1450

== Catholic titular bishops ==
- Georg (Jerzy) (1446 Appointed - 1461)
- Rodrigo de San Ginés, (Appointed 21 Apr 1501 )
- Laurentius Montonis, (Appointed 22 Apr 1504)
- Franciscus Ladini Appointed 4 Sep 1517 - )
- Dominik Małachowski, (3 Apr 1527 - 15 Mar 1544)
- Giovanni Antonio Melegnano (Appointed 6 Feb 1534 )
- Erasmus de Cracovia, (14 Nov 1544 - )
- Andrzej Spot, (23 Mar 1547 - 5 Mar 1560)
- Leonardo Marini, (5 Mar 1550 - 26 Jan 1560)
- Stanisław Słomowski (Szbomowski) (14 Feb 1560 - 7 Sep 1565)
- Marcin Białobrzeski (3 Apr 1566 - 19 Jul 1577)
- Gonzalo Herrera Olivares (23 Jul 1568 - 20 Sep 1579)
- Jakub Milewski (6 Oct 1578 - 20 Nov 1586)
- Paweł Dembski (11 Mar 1587 Appointed - 28 Feb 1614 Died)
- Cristoforo Caetani (10 May 1623 - 2 Oct 1634)
- Girolamo Binago, (12 Jan 1637 - 17 Oct 1643)
- Wojciech Lipnicki (5 Feb 1646 - 4 Jun 1657)
- Girolamo Buonvisi (17 Jul 1651 - 28 May 1657)
- Giulio Spinola (14 Jan 1658 - 18 Jul 1667)
- Rodulphus Acquaviva (12 Mar 1668 - 12 May 1672)
- Albert Ernst von Wartenberg (10 Nov 1687 - 9 Oct 1715)
- Federico Caccia (2 Jan 1693 - 13 Apr 1693)
- Vincenzo Bichi (11 Dec 1702 - 31 Mar 1732)
- Giacomo Oddi (9 Jun 1732 - 5 Apr 1745)
- Girolamo Spínola † (13 Apr 1744 - 15 Dec 1760)
- Girolamo Palermo, C.R. † (5 Aug 1765 Appointed - 2 Aug 1776 Died)
- Manuel Buenaventura Figueroa Barrero (1 Oct 1782 Appointed - 3 Apr 1783 Died)
- Juan Acisclo de Vera y Delgado (20 Jul 1801 Appointed - 15 Mar 1815)
- Faustino Zucchini (19 Apr 1822 Appointed - )
- Vincento Garofoli (24 Feb 1832 Appointed - 3 Feb 1839 Died)
- Nicolaus Murad (9 Oct 1843 Appointed - 26 Dec 1862 Died)
- Raphael de Martinis, (28 Apr 1896 Appointed - 15 Feb 1900 Died)
- Diomede Panici (19 Apr 1900 Appointed - 6 Aug 1909 Died)
- Beda Giovanni Cardinale (3 Feb 1910 Appointed - 8 Nov 1910)
- Sébastien Herscher (19 Jan 1911 Appointed - 25 Aug 1931 Died)
- Amleto Giovanni Cicognani (17 Mar 1933 - 18 Dec)
- Émile André Jean-Marie Maury (8 Jul 1959 Appointed - 25 Jun 1968 Appointed, Archbishop of Reims)

== Suffragan dioceses ==
- Attuda
- Aizanoi
- Themisonium
- Tiberiopolis
- Traianopolis (Phrygia)
- Synaus (titular see)
- Cidyessus
- Alia
