= Aphthonius =

Aphthonius may refer to:

- Aelius Festus Aphthonius (4th century), Latin grammarian, possibly of African origin
- Aphthonius of Antioch (late 4th century), Greek sophist and rhetorician
- Aphthonius of Alexandria (4th century), ancient Gnostic bishop
