= Zopyrus (bishop of Barca) =

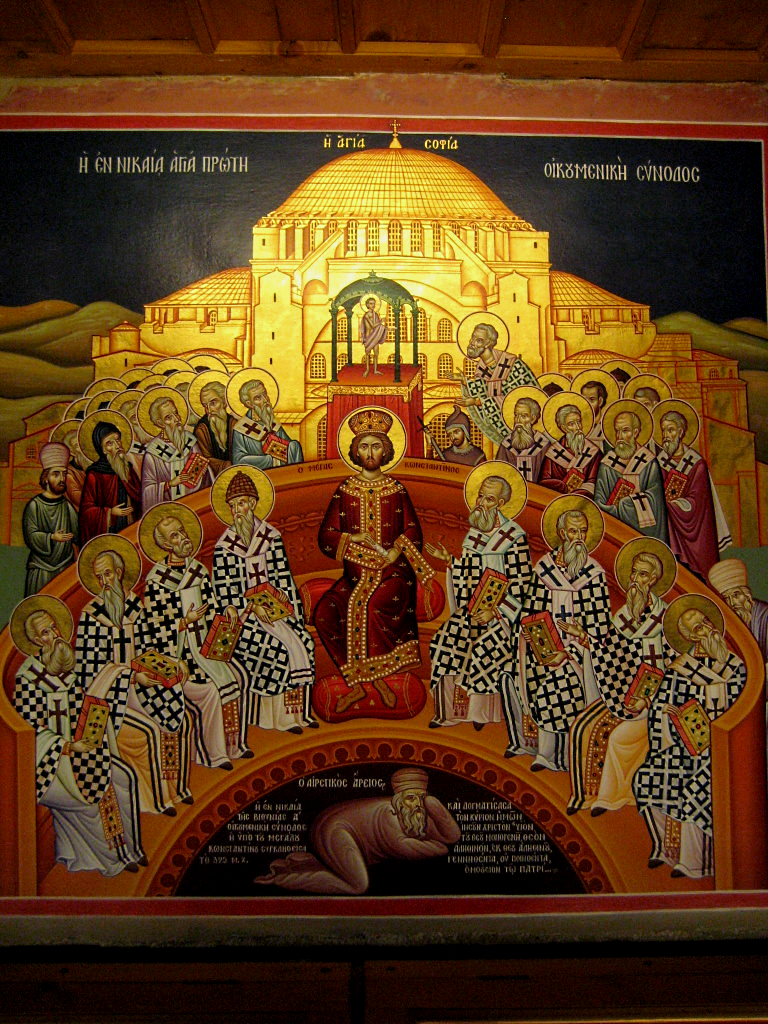
The Council of Nicaea, with Arius depicted as defeated by the council, lying under the feet of Emperor Constantine.

Zopyrus (Bishop of Barca), (Ζώπυρος) was a bishop of the ancient Roman Town of Barca in Cyrenica, (Marj, Libya, North Africa).

Zopyros is best known to history as an attendee present at the Council of Nicaea in 325. He was one of the Arian Bishops at that Council. Even though Arius (the founder of Arianism) and his bishop Secundus of Ptolemais were from the neighboring city (and Barca's port) of Ptolemais, Cyrenaica, Zopyrus eventually signed the Nicean Creed with the other Arian supporters, Theognis of Nicaea, Eusebius of Nicomedia and Maris of Chalcedon. He (probably) did not sign the condemnation of Arius. It is unclear if he was exiled with the other three Arian bishops.
