= Arsacius =

Arsacius may refer to:

- Saint Arsatius or Arsacius
- Arsacius of Tarsus, the archbishop of Constantinople from 404 to 405.
- Arsacius (magister militum), Magister militum of the 5th century
- Arsacius of Nicomedia
