= Cecropius of Nicomedia =

Cecropius of Nicomedia was a bishop of Nicomedia and a key player in the Arian controversy.

== Career ==
Cecropius, a semi-Arian, had been Bishop of Laodicea, and was transferred from Laodicea by the Arian emperor Constantius I in 351AD. Athanasius bishop of Alexandria, was critical of this appointment and royal interference in the church.

Nicomedia, a former Bithynian and for a short time under Diocletian, Roman capital, and a short distance from Constantine's Palace at Nicaea, was an influential and rich city in the early Byzantine Empire; the appointment as bishop carried much influence. As Bishop, Cecropius attended the synod of Sirmium which deposed Photinus and he attended the consecration of a new church building in Anevra, in 358.

He is also known from a letter of George of Laodicea that was critical of the Eudoxian teaching of one Aëtius and his disciples at Antioch The Emperor Constantius eventually ordered Aëtius and his followers be brought before Cecropius to answer to the charges alleged against them.

== Earthquake of Nicomedia ==
In 358 Constantius had proposed to hold an ecumenical council in the cathedral of Nicomedia; however days before the Council was to be held an earthquake struck the city, destroying the venue. The earthquake struck on 24 August 358AD and the city of Nicomedia was devastated. The cathedral was destroyed. Cecropius of Nicomedia was killed in the earthquake.

Sozomen held that only Cecropius and an unnamed Bishop of Bosphorus were killed. Philostorgius claimed the number killed was fifteen.

Opponents of Arianism held the earthquake to be divine judgment and that fifteen bishops who had arrived for the Council were killed.

The Council was postponed and held instead in Seleucia in Persia. Seleucia was selected as Eudoxius objected to holding it in Tarsus and his opponent Basil objected to the royal city of Nicaea.

It was said that the quake was predicted by Arsacius, a Persian, and a former soldier turned monastic philosopher. The legend of Arsacius holds that as a soldier he tended the emperors lions, but following his time in the army he became a monastic. It is said he could cast out demons and once ordered a great dragon to kill itself which it did. One day he had a vision of the calamity to befall his city and going to the clergy with his warning was not believed but ridiculed. He retired to his tower and prayed prostrate. Following the quake (on 24 August 358) he was found dead in his undamaged tower.
