= Eluza =

Ancient city in Turkey

Eluza (or Iluza) is an ancient city in the late Roman province of Phrygia Pacatiana Prima, Asia Minor.

Its site is at modern Acemlar or Hacimlar, Turkey.

== Ecclesiastical history ==
Eluza was a suffragan of Laodicea in Phrygia.

The diocese was nominally restored in 1933 as Latin titular bishopric of Eluza (Latin = Curiate Italian), Latin adjective Eluzan (US).

== Sources and references ==
- GCatholic - data for all sections
