= Lukewarm =

Lukewarm or The Lukewarm may refer to:

- Lukewarm (Porridge), a fictional character from the BBC series Porridge
- "2 + 2 = 5" (song), a 2003 song by Radiohead alternatively titled "The Lukewarm"
- "The Lukewarm," a song by Omar Rodríguez-López from his album Se Dice Bisonte, No Búfalo (2007)
- Luke Warm, pseudonym for English musician Jo Callis while he was in The Rezillos
- Lukewarm, an album of rarities released by the band Ookla the Mok in 2022

== See also ==
- Laodicean Church, described metaphorically by Jesus as "lukewarm" in the Book of Revelation
