= Florentius of Constantinople =

Prominent Christian Clergymen

Florentius of Constantinople (Greek: Φλωρέντιος) was the rival Anomoean archbishop of Constantinople (c. 363), holding the office at the same time as and in opposition to Eudoxius of Antioch.

The Anomoeans were a 4th century Christian sect that upheld an extreme form of Arianism, according to which Jesus Christ was not of the same nature (consubstantial) nor, as maintained by the more moderate Arians, of a similar nature (homoiousian) as God the Father. When many within the congregation of Eudoxius of Antioch turned against him in Constantinople, and as the members of other sects similarly left their own congregations, Aëtius of Antioch and Eunomius of Cyzicus, acting on behalf of the new Roman emperor Jovian, used their offices in the interests of Arianism by creating other bishops of that party, including Paemenius, (Anomoean) bishop of Constantinople (c. 363, at the same time as Eudoxius of Antioch), Philostorgius, in Photius, Candidus, (Anomoean) bishop of Lydia (c. 363–?), and Arrianus, (Anomoean) bishop of Ionia (c. 363–?). On the death of Paemenius, Aëtius and Eunomius appointed Florentius as his successor as bishop.
