= Paweł Dembski =

Polish churchman

Paweł Dembski was a 16th-century Polish churchman.

Born into the Prawdzic noble family clan about 1540AD, he was a Catholic priest, Canon, Auxiliary Bishop and Vicar General of the Diocese of Kraków. He was also Bishop of Laodicea in Phrygia.(modern Turkey). He died on 28 February 1614 in Kraków.
