= Secundus of Ptolemais =

4th-century bishop; excommunicated

Secundus of Ptolemais was a 4th-century bishop of Ptolemais, excommunicated after the First Council of Nicaea for his nontrinitarianism.

Secundus, was bishop of Ptolemais and a patron of Arius, and is listed among those present at the council of Nicaea. Theonas and Secundus were the only bishops at the Council of Nicaea who refused to accept its decree nor sign the Nicaean Creed, a position for which he was deposed by the bishop of Alexandria, and sent into exile He later recovered his bishopric as part of Constantine the Great's attempts at reconciliation, though his Arian successor Stephanus of Ptolemais was deposed in about 360.

== See also ==
- Arianism
- Arian controversy
- Timeline of Christianity: Era of the Seven Ecumenical Councils
