= Marcin Białobrzeski =

Polish bishop and theologian

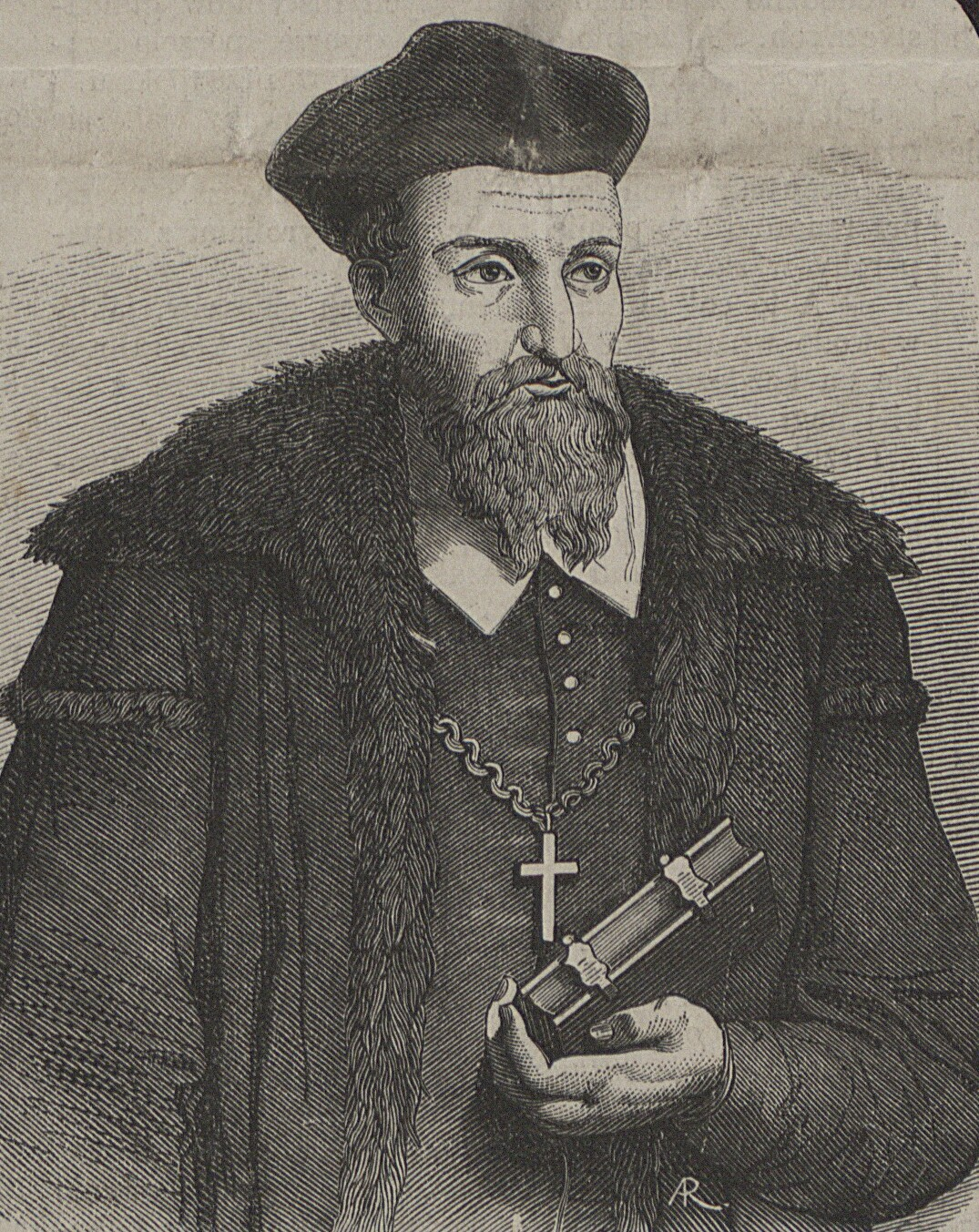

Marcin Białobrzeski (1530–1586) was a 16th-century Polish bishop, bibliophile, author, theologian, and preacher. Białobrzeski was born in 1530 into the Bialobrzeski family branch which used the Awdaniec coat of arms.

== Career ==
=== Church career ===
He took religious vows in the Cistercian Monastery of Sulejów and was educated at the expense of the monastery in the Krakow Academy of Literature.

He was a relative of Andrzej Spot. After Spot's death in 1559, Białobrzeski was elected abbot, and in 1565 or 1566, he was appointed Suffragan bishop at Krakow, as well as Titular Bishop of Laodicea in Phrygia. In 1571, he joined the cathedral chapter. On 19 July 1577, Bialobrzeski was appointed Bishop of Kamyanets-Podilskyi (Kamieniec), Ukraine.

On 7 April 1576, he greeted Stefan Batory at Mogiła Abbey. Shortly afterwards he was installed to the see of Kamieniec-Podolsk. Along with Lukasz Podolski, a canon of Kraków Cathedral, he participated in the 1557 Synod in Northern Poland, and a year later in the Synod in Jędrzejów.

=== Political and diplomatic roles ===
He was a representative of the clergy in 1573 at the Sejm (parliament), and after the coronation of Henry of Valois as King of Poland on 13 February 1574, he delivered an oration at the funeral of Sigismund August. After the escape of Henry Valois from Poland, he sided with the Habsburgs. In March 1576, Białobrzeski went with Krzysztof Lanckoroński to Vienna to an embassy of Emperor Maximilian to tell him about the newly elected King, Stefan Bathory.

In 1580, Białobrzeski went to Rome on a diplomatic mission and he served as the King's representative at the funeral of his brother, Christopher Báthory. At the 1585 Sejm, he was part of the faction defending the execution of the nobleman Samuel Zborowski in the previous year.

== Death ==
Marcin Białobrzeski died on 19 April 1586 in Kraków, where he was buried.

== Literary works ==
Białobrzeski was a Renaissance humanist. He is considered to be the author of 19 works, including the first Catholic homily in Polish and several books about comparative religion. He left several entries in the margins of books. His works include:

- Katechizm albo wizerunek prawej wiary chrześciańskiej ("The Catechism or image of the right faith"), Kraków, 1567
- Kazanie na pogrzebie świętej pamięci zacnego Zygmunta Augusta ("Eulogy at the funeral to the holy memory of worthy Sigismund Augustus"), Kraków: S. Szarffenberger, 1574
- Orthodox confessio de Uno Dem Christiani catholic credit, adorant et invocant, ex S. Literis description, Kraków: A. Piotrkowczyk, 1577
- Kazanie... o przyjmowaniu Ciała i Krwie P. Jezusa Chrystusa pod jedną osobą ("Sermon about taking the body and blood of Jesus Christ as one substance"), Kraków: A. Piotrkowczyk, 1579
- Postilla orthodoxa: to jest wykład Świętych Ewangielii niedzielnych i świąt uroczystych przez cały rok, (Orthodox postilla: sacred and ceremonial sermons on the gospels of feasts throughout the year); cz. 1–2, Cracow: Łazarzow, 1581
- Wierszowane dialogi o Tobiaszu i o Jobie (About Tobias and Job)
- Książeczka o religii i potężnych czynach Turków ("Book about religion and the mighty deeds of the Turks")
- Letter to Andreas Dudith, 27 February 1575
- Letters to the Pope, 1583

== Gallery ==
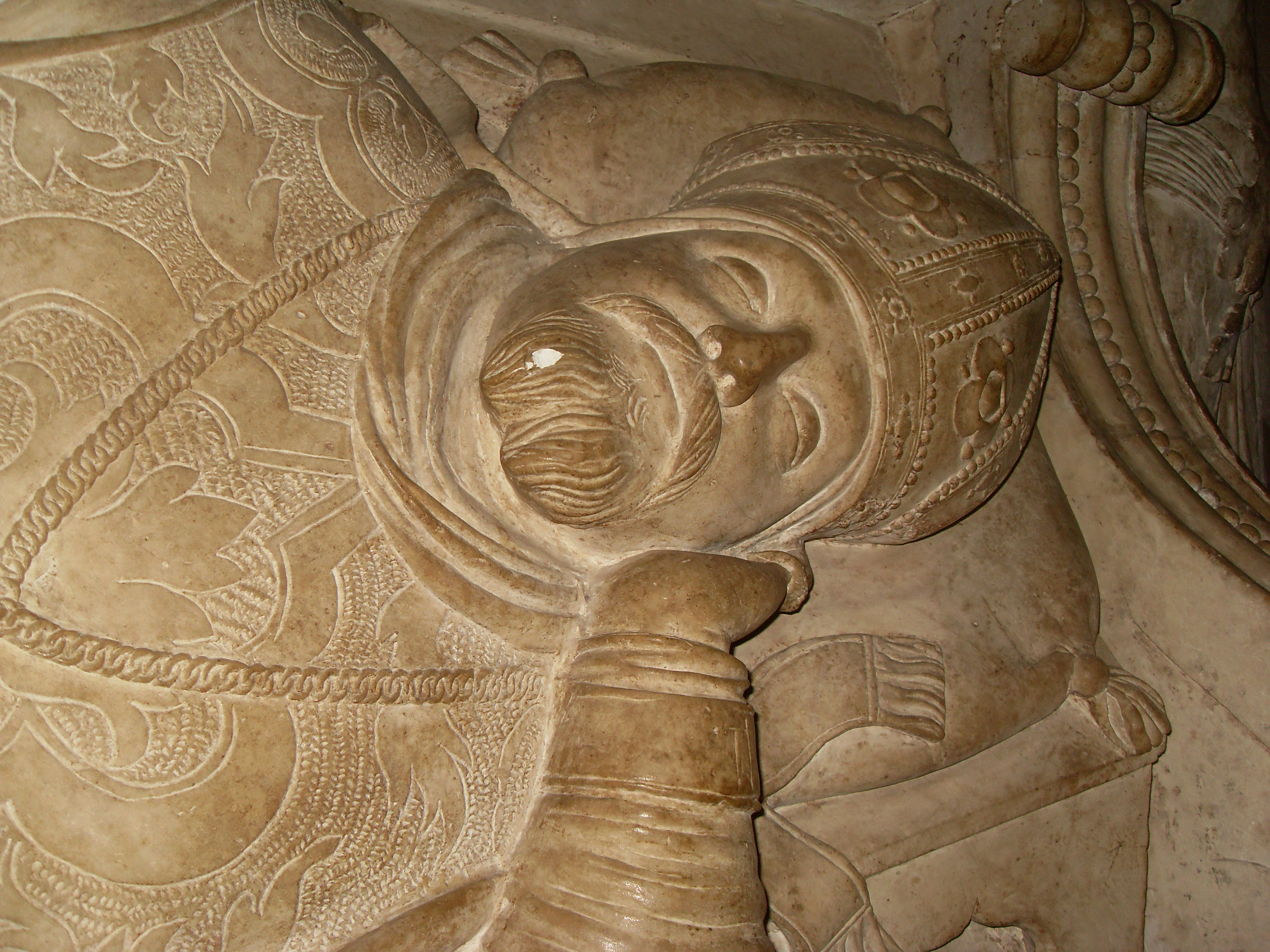
Marcin Białobrzeski

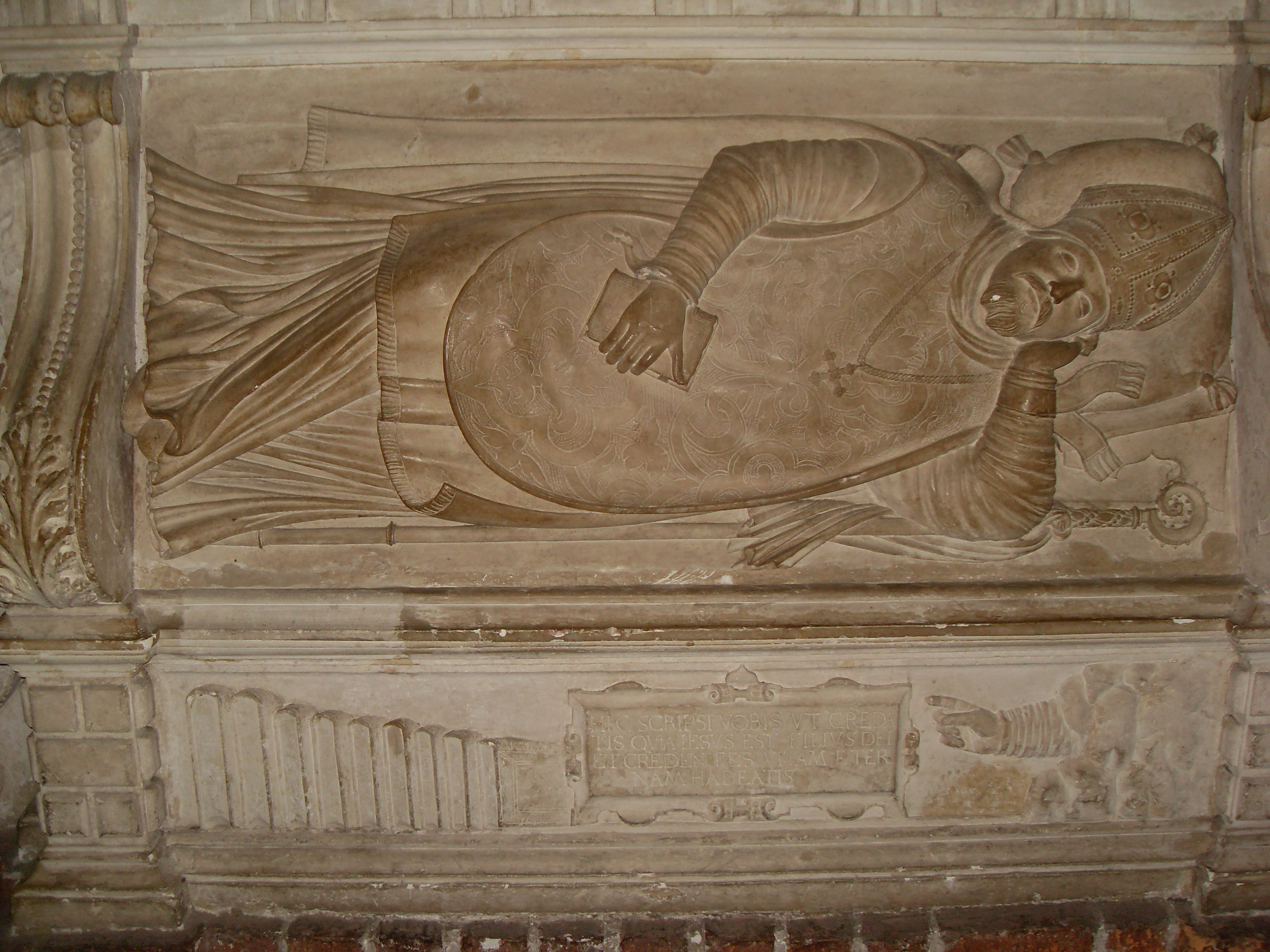
Nagrobek Marcina Białobrzeskiego, opactwo oo. cystersów w Mogile
