= Jakub Milewski =

Jakub Milewski of Jastrzębiec coat of arms was a Catholic priest, Canon of Gniezno, Dean of the Łęczyca and Łowicz, Canon of Kraków and Auxiliary Bishop of Kraków.

He was a Catholic priest, Canon of Gniezno, Dean of the łęczyca province and in Łowicz, Canon of Kraków, Auxiliary Bishop of Kraków, from 1578–1586.

The son of Mikołaj Milewskiego a wealthy landowner of the Jastrzębiec noble family. In 1550 he became Canon of the chapter of Gniezno, and showed mastery in financial matters and was made Treasurer for Primate Nicholas Dierzgowskiego and acted in a management role in Wieluń County. In 1572 he stepped down from his position following a lawsuit, with the new Primate, Uchańskim. In 1577 he was the Prosecutor on behalf of Bishop Peter Myszkowskiego for the bishopric of Kraków, who in 1578 appointed him auxiliary bishop.

On 6 October 1578 Pope Gregory XIII also made him titular bishop of Laodicea in Phrygia. As bishop, he consecrated the Church of Liszkach, took part in the financial aspects of the Roman Curia. Bishop Milewski died in Kraków, Poland on November 20, 1586 and was buried in Wawel Cathedral.
