= Dominik Małachowski =

Dominik Małachowski O.P.
- Titular Bishop of Laodicea in Phrygia
- Church: Catholic Church
- Diocese: Diocese of Kraków
- In office: 3 April 1527 – 15 March 1544
- Predecessor: Francesco Ladini
- Successor: Erazm Ciołek
- Previous post: Auxiliary Bishop of Kraków (1527-1544)

Orders
- Consecration: 20 September 1528 by Piotr Tomicki

Personal details
- Died: 15 March 1544

Dominik Małachowski was a 16th-century Roman Catholic archbishop from Poland.

Born into the Grzymała noble family He was a Dominican friar, doctor of theology, prior of the monastery in Cracow, and Auxiliary Bishop of Kraków from 1527–1544.

He was also titular bishop of Laodicea in Phrygia on 3 April 1527. In 1530 he participated in the coronation of King Sigismund Augustus.

He died on 15 March 1544. Buried in the Basilica of St. Trinity (on the gravestone the date of death is 1539).
