= Ancyra =

Ancyra may refer to:

- Ancyra, an ancient Galatian name for Ankara
- Ancyra (planthopper), the type genus of insects in the tribe Ancyrini
