= Andrzej Spot =

Andrzej Spot was a 16th-century Catholic priest, Cistercian monk, Abbot, Canon, and Auxiliary Bishop of Kraków.

Born into the Łabędź (Swan) noble family, his family was originally Prussian.

He was Auxiliary Bishop of Kraków and titular bishop of Laodicea in Phrygia from 23 March 1547 till 1560. In 1544 he received privileges from Pope Julius III and In 1549 from King Sigismund August. He died on 5 March 1560.
