= Laodicean Church =

Early Christian community in Asia Minor

The Laodicean Church was a Christian community established in the ancient city of Laodicea on the Lycus in the Roman province of Asia and was one of the early centers of Christianity. The church was established in the Apostolic Age, the earliest period of Christianity, and is probably best known for being one of the seven churches of Asia addressed by name in the Book of Revelation (Rev. 3.14–22).

== Occurrences in the New Testament ==
=== Epistle to the Colossians ===
The Christian community in Laodicea seems to have been closely connected with that of nearby Colossae (also in the Lycus valley, 10 miles (16 km) distant). Laodicea is mentioned four times in the New Testament's epistle to the Colossians (Col. 2:1; 4:13,15,16). In writing to the Colossians, Paul the Apostle sends greetings to them through a Laodicean named Nymphas and the church at their house (4:15). He additionally greets Archippus, who might also be from Laodicea (4:17), and he instructs the Colossians to exchange his letter with one he has written to the Laodiceans (4:16). This would indicate a Christian presence in Laodicea as early as the 50s CE. It would also indicate that Laodicea (like Colossae) was not evangelized by Paul but possibly by his disciple Epaphras (Col 4:12–13).

In Colossians 4:16, Paul states:

"And when this epistle hath been read among you, cause that it be read also in the church of the Laodiceans; and that ye also read the epistle from Laodicea."

This reference to a letter which the Colossians were to obtain "from Laodicea" has created a puzzle which has not yet received a generally accepted solution. Various alternatives have been suggested:

- the epistle in question has been lost
- the wording of Col. 4:16 indicates that the letter was not written to but from Laodicea
- Tertullian suggested that Marcionite heretics changed the title of the canonical epistle to the Ephesians
- an apocryphal Epistle to the Laodiceans has had some supporters at times, but modern scholars now regard it as a forgery
- it is actually one of the other canonical epistles, such as the Letter to Philemon or the Epistle to the Hebrews

No general agreement currently exists as to whether the letter is extant under another name or was lost prior to the formation of the canon.

=== Book of Revelation ===
In John's vision, recorded in the Book of Revelation, Christ instructs John to write a message to the seven churches of Asia. The message to Laodicea is one of judgment with a call to repentance. The oracle contains a number of metaphors.

=== "I wish that you were cold or hot" (Revelation 3:15–16) ===
"I know thy works, that thou art neither cold nor hot: I would thou were cold or hot. So then because thou art lukewarm, and neither cold nor hot, I will spue thee out of my mouth." (KJV).

The traditional view has been that the Laodiceans were being criticized for their neutrality or lack of zeal (hence "lukewarm"). One problem with this is that Christ's desire that they be either “cold or hot” implies that both extremes are positive. The traditional view saw “cold” as a negative, the idea apparently being that Jesus either wants the readers to be either zealous (“hot”) for him or completely uncommitted (“cold”), but not middle-of-the-road. A middle-of-the-road stance was thought to pollute the pure representation of the faith and create misconceptions about the church and its ideals.

However, a more recent interpretation has suggested that this metaphor has been drawn from the water supply of the city, which was lukewarm, in contrast to the hot springs at nearby Hierapolis and the cold, pure waters of Colossae. The archaeology shows that Laodicea had an aqueduct that probably carried water from hot mineral springs some five miles south, which would have become tepid before entering the city (see main Laodicea article). The imagery of the Laodicean aqueduct suggests not that "hot" is good and "cold" is bad, but that both hot and cold water are useful, whereas lukewarm water is emetic.

=== "Poor, blind, and naked" (3:17–18) ===
"Because thou sayest, I am rich, and increased with goods, and have need of nothing; and knowest not that thou art wretched, and miserable, and poor, and blind, and naked: I counsel thee to buy of me gold tried in the fire, that thou mayest be rich; and white raiment, that thou mayest be clothed, and that the shame of thy nakedness do not appear; and anoint thine eyes with eyesalve, that thou mayest see." (KJV).

The words attributed to the Laodiceans may mark an ironic over-confidence in regard to spiritual wealth; they are unable to recognize their bankruptcy. However, the image may also be drawing on the perceived worldly wealth of the city. The city was a place of great finance and banking. In 60 A.D. the city was hit by a major earthquake. The city refused help from the Roman Empire and rebuilt the city of its own accord.

The reference to the "white raiment" may refer to the cloth trade of Laodicea. The city was known for its black wool that was produced in the area. The reference to eye medication is again often thought to reflect the historical situation of Laodicea. According to Strabo (12.8.20) there was a medical school in the city, where a famous ophthalmologist practiced. The city also lies within the boundaries of ancient Phrygia, from where an ingredient of eye-lotions, the so-called "Phrygian powder", was supposed to have originated.

=== "Behold, I stand" (3:20) ===
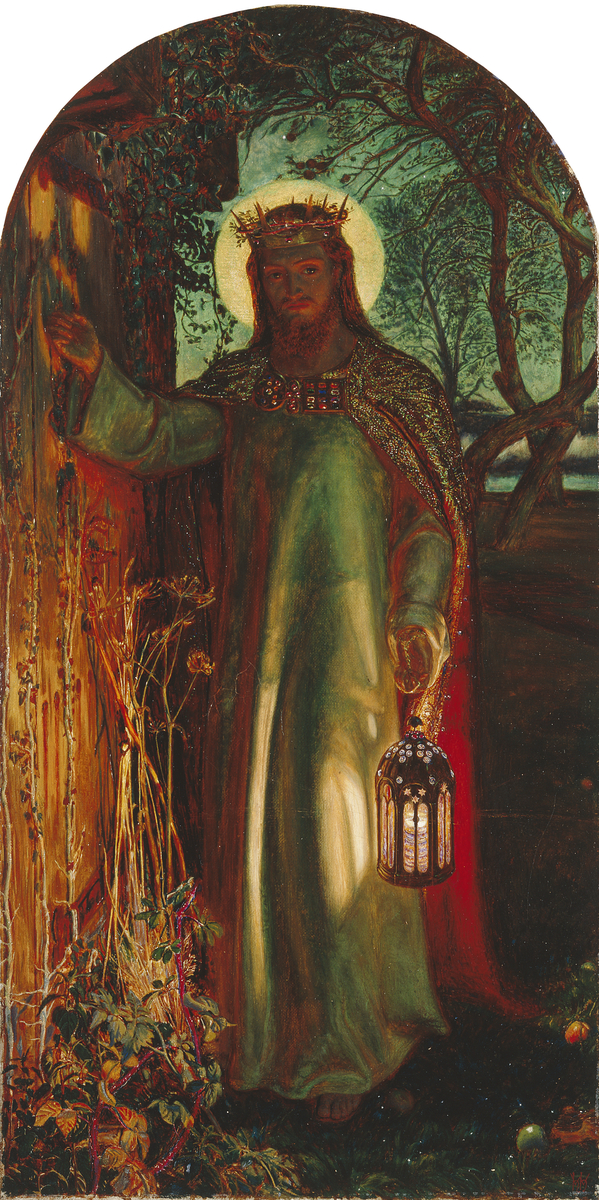
Holman Hunt's painting The Light of the World inspired by Rev 3:20's metaphor of Christ knocking at the door of the Laodicean Church.

"Behold, I stand at the door, and knock: if any man hear my voice, and open the door, I will come in to him, and will sup with him, and he with me."

This is among the most famous images of the Revelation and is the subject of the famous painting The Light of the World by Holman Hunt. It bears similarities to a saying of Jesus in Mark 13:33–37 and Luke 12:35–38. The door in the painting has no handle and can therefore be opened only from the inside.

Commentators variously view it as a metaphor of intimate fellowship, and/or a reference to the Second Coming of Christ. The theme of divine invitations to eat are found both in the New Testament (e.g., the Parable of the Wedding Feast) and in Graeco-Roman religion. Commentators have also suggested that Revelation 3:20 is the only New Testament reference to the Song of Solomon in the Old Testament, linking this verse with Song of Solomon 5:2. Various papyri, such as "POxy 3693", include invitations to attend a dinner with gods such as Serapis, but these are issued by specified individuals to feasts at a temple of a god and do not suggest the visitation of the home by the divinity.

== Later Christian Laodicea ==
There was a Council in Laodicea, A.D. c. 363–64, although the date is disputed. The Council of Chalcedon in 451 approved the canons of this council, making these canons ecumenical. The city is a titular see of the Catholic Church, Laodicensis in Phrygia.

== See also ==
- Christianity in Turkey
