= Nympha of Laodicea =

Early Christian leader mentioned in the New Testament

Nympha
- Other names: Nymphas (Masculine rendering)
- Occupations: Householder and Hostess of the Laodicean Church
- Years active: Mid-first century CE

Nympha, or the masculine rendering Nymphas (fl. mid-1st century CE) was an early Christian leader noted in the New Testament for hosting a house church, as mentioned in Colossians 4:15–16. Her brief appearance in the Pauline epistle, generally dated to 62 CE, has led scholars to view her as an established and influential member of the early Christian community in the Lycus Valley region of Asia Minor (Turkey). Most scholars now agree that Nympha was female, contrary to the male reading found in some 5th-century Western text-type revisions.

== Biblical mention ==
Information on Nympha is sourced from two brief verses in Colossians 4:15–16, a letter traditionally attributed to Paul and written around 62 CE. The passage reads:

Give my greetings to the brothers and sisters at Laodicea, and to Nympha and the church in her house. After this letter has been read to you, see that it is also read in the church of the Laodiceans and that you in turn read the letter from Laodicea.

From the text, the following can be concluded about Nympha:

1. She hosted a house church, as indicated by the phrase "the church in her house." She was associated with the Christian community in Laodicea, a city in the Lycus Valley.
2. She is explicitly mentioned alongside the broader Laodicean church, suggesting she held a significant position.
3. She was known to Paul or the author of Colossians, as evidenced by the instruction to greet her.
4. She was active around Paul’s ministry and the writing of Colossians (62 CE).

== Etymology of name ==
=== Meaning ===
"Nympha" (pronounced nim'-fl) is a feminine noun meaning "a bride" or "a nymph." Its origins lie in the Latin word nympha, which was derived from the Greek word (νύμφη). "Nymphas" is a masculine noun meaning "bridegroom" Greek (numphios). According to Abarim Publications, it is understood to derive from a very ancient Proto-Indo-European root associated with marriage. This etymological connection is reflected in related Latin terms—such as nuptiae (wedding) and its derivative nuptialis—which in turn gave rise to the English word "nuptial."

Dr. Balabanski speculates that the name is associated with nature deities in Greco-Roman religion. Thus, the pagan etymology of her name might indicate a non-Jewish background. She also suggests that its connection to monumental public fountains (nymphaea), which were common in ancient Anatolian cities like Laodicea, could hint at possible ties to water infrastructure or rural landownership. Furthermore, although the name’s meaning ("bride") later resonated with nuptial imagery in Christian symbolism, this connection is notably absent in Pauline writings.

=== Gender ===
The gender of the name Nymphan (Nympha/Nymphas) in Colossians 4:15 is ambiguous in early manuscripts, as Greek accents (absent in original texts) determine its gender. Pronoun variants following “house” (oikon) further complicate identification. The earliest textual witness, is the Codex Vaticanus (4th century) uses a feminine pronoun, indicating a female leader. Later texts in the early 5th century adopt a masculine pronoun. Codex Sinaiticus (4th century) uses a plural pronoun (“their house”).

Interpretations often reflect cultural biases, for example early scholars assumed male leadership (e.g., Lightfoot, Abbott), while mid-20th-century scholars like Lohse deemed the gender indeterminable. New Testament scholar Ben Witherington III identifies this as an intentional effort to minimize women’s roles in the early church. Modern textual criticism favors the feminine reading, as copyists were unlikely to alter a masculine original to feminine or plural. James D. G. Dunn concurs, stating the feminine "Nympha" is original, aligning with Paul’s recognition of women like Phoebe and Junia.

== House church ==
=== Location ===
The location of Nympha’s house church is debated. Biblical scholar Robert Wilson argued "The location of this house church depends on whether we see a break between the two parts of the verse, or take the whole together." Possible locations are speculated upon are the following:

1. Laodicea: The immediate context of Colossians 4:15–16 cites Laodicea, where Nympha is mentioned separately from the general greeting to the Laodicean Christians—a view supported by the majority of scholars.
2. Colossae: Some theories propose that the house was in Colossae, about 10 miles from Laodicea, although the text offers no explicit evidence for this location.
3. Hierapolis: Other scholars, including Dr. A.E. Edebe and D. Campbell, advocate for the possibility.

=== Plural churches in Laodicea speculation ===
Scholars such as Dunn and Wayne A. Meeks, posit that Laodicea likely hosted multiple house churches. Some scholars disagree, saying there is only one church.

=== Social context ===
The Lycus Valley’s interconnected urban centers—Colossae, Laodicea, and Hierapolis—shared economic and religious networks. Paul’s instruction to exchange letters between these churches (Colossians 4:16) implies collaboration among their house churches.

== Role and economic background speculation ==
=== Societal status ===
Her title would be Householder, or Hostess. J. Sumney and Beulah Wood contends she is probably a widow.

Scholars propose that the reference to Nympha’s house indicates it functioned as a central meeting place for the churches of Laodicea, or at least for a significant portion of them. This would indicate that her house was large enough to accommodate such a significant assembly.

According to D’Angelo, Nympha’s leadership contrasts with the patriarchal household codes in Colossians 3:18–4:1, which mandated the submission of women, children, and enslaved people. D’Angelo argues her prominence reflects women’s active but later-marginalized roles in early Christianity. As the earliest canonical text to employ such codes, Colossians marks a shift toward Greco-Roman social hierarchies, signaling the emergence of a Pauline "school" that integrated cultural norms to regulate Christian communal life.

=== Economic background ===
Scholars suggest that Nympha was likely a woman of wealth due to her role as a house church host and her potential connections to regional industries. James D. G. Dunn (1994) notes that hosting a house church required financial resources to provide space and support for gatherings, aligning her with other early Christian patrons. Victoria S. Balabanski (2020) links her name to the Lycus Valley’s lucrative textile industry and water infrastructure (nymphaea), implying her household may have been involved in these trades, which demanded significant capital. Similarly, Robert McLachlan Wilson (2005) notes that owning a home large enough to host a church was a clear indicator of wealth in the Roman world. Together, these scholars argue that Nympha’s prominence in Paul’s greetings and her social context point to her status as a wealthy patron.

== See also ==
- House churches in early Christianity
- Women in the New Testament
- Laodicean Church
