= Themisonium =

Themisonium or Themisonion (Ancient Greek: Θεμισώνιον), was a town of ancient Phrygia, near the borders of Pisidia, whence in later times it was regarded as a town of Pisidia. Pausanias relates that the Themisonians showed a cave, about 30 stadia from their town, in which, on the advice of Heracles, Apollo, and Hermes, they had concealed their wives and children during an invasion of the Celts, and in which afterwards they set up statues of these divinities. According to the Tabula Peutingeriana, Themisonium was 34 miles from Laodicea on the Lycus.

In the late Roman Empire it belonged to the Roman province of Phrygia Pacatiana Prima.

Its bishopric was a suffragan of Laodicea in Phrygia, the capital and metropolitan see of the province.

Its site is unlocated.
