= Arsacius of Nicomedia =

Saint from Roman Anatolia

Arsacius of Nicomedia (d. 24 August 358) was a soldier in the Roman army and is considered a saint of the Catholic church.

According to tradition, he converted to Christianity and was arrested during the reign of Roman emperor Licinius. Although he did not apostatize, Arsacius was eventually released from prison. He lived as hermit in a tower near Nicomedia (modern Turkey) for decades. When he received a vision that a disaster was about to befall the city, he went to the nearest church to warn others. His warnings were ignored, but a strong earthquake struck Nicomedia immediately afterwards. Citizens took shelter in his tower, where they discovered his body. He had apparently died while praying. Arsacius has been known for his gift of prophecy and as a miracle worker through his prayers ever since.

Note that this Arsacius is sometimes confused with Cecrophius of Nicomedia, a bishop of the city.
