= Aphthonius of Alexandria =

Manichaean leader

Aphthonius (Ancient Greek: Ἀφθόνιος) of Alexandria is mentioned by church historian Philostorgius as a learned and eloquent bishop of the Manichaeans. He is mentioned as a disciple and commentator of the prophet Mani by Photios I of Constantinople and Peter of Sicily, and in the form of abjuring Manichaeism.

Philostorgius adds that the Arian theologian Aëtius of Antioch challenged Aphthonius to a public debate, and traveled to Alexandria to engage in this. Aphthonius was defeated in the debate. Philostorgius goes on to say that Aetius won the argument so profoundly, and caused his opponent such shame, that Aphthonius fell ill immediately afterward, and died of grief seven days later.
