= Theognis of Nicaea =

4th-century Christian bishop

Theognis of Nicaea (Ancient Greek: Θέογνις) was a 4th-century Bishop of Nicaea, excommunicated after the First Council of Nicaea for not denouncing Arius and his nontrinitarianism strongly enough.

He is best known to history as an attendee present at the Council of Nicaea in 325. He was one of the Arian Bishops at that Council. He eventually signed the Nicean Creed with the other Arian supporters, Zopyrus (Bishop of Barca), Eusebius of Nicomedia and Maris of Chalcedon. He was exiled with the other three Arian bishops.
