= Anomoeanism =

4th-century Christian sect

In 4th-century Christianity, the Anomoeans /ˌænəˈmiːənz/, also known as Heterousians /ˌhɛtərəˈjuːʒənz/, Aetians /eɪˈiːʃənz/, or Eunomians /juːˈnoʊmiənz/, were a sect that held to an extreme form of Arianism, claiming that Jesus was neither of the same nature (homoousian) as God the Father nor a similar nature to God the Father (homoiousian)—the latter being maintained by the semi-Arians.

== Overview ==
The word anomoean comes from Greek ἀ(ν)- (an-) 'not' and ὅμοιος (homoios) 'similar', thus 'different; dissimilar'. In the 4th century, during the reign of Constantius II, this was the name by which the followers of Aëtius and Eunomius were described. The term heterousian derives from Greek ἑτεροούσιος, heterooúsios 'differing in substance' from ἕτερος, héteros 'another' and οὐσία, ousía 'substance, being'.

The semi-Arians condemned the Anomoeans in the Council of Seleucia, and the Anomoeans condemned the semi-Arians in their turn in the Councils of Constantinople and Antioch; erasing the word ὅμοιος (homoios) from the formula of Rimini and that of Constantinople and protesting that the Word had not only a different substance but also a will different from that of the Father. From that, they were to be called ἀνόμοιοι (anomoioi).

In the 5th century, the Anomoean presbyter Philostorgius wrote an Anomoean church history.

== Notable Anomoeans ==
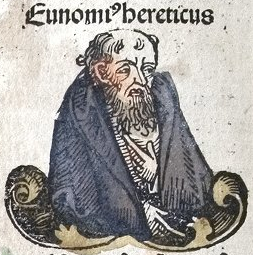
Eunomius of Cyzicus, from the Nuremberg Chronicle

- Aëtius, who founded the Anomoean tradition, later consecrated bishop in 361.
- Theodulus, bishop of Chaeretapa (to c. 363) and Palestine (c. 363 – c. 379).
- Eunomius, bishop of Cyzicus (360–361) and exiled bishop (361 – c. 393).
- Paemenius, bishop of Constantinople (c. 363, at the same time as Eudoxius of Antioch).
- Candidus, bishop of Lydia (from c. 363).
- Arrianus, bishop of Ionia (from c. 363).
- Florentius, bishop of Constantinople (from c. 363, at the same time as Eudoxius of Antioch).
- Thallus, bishop of Lesbos (from c. 363, at the same time as Eudoxius of Antioch).
- Euphronius, bishop of Galatia, the Black Sea and Cappadocia (from c. 363).
- Julian, bishop of Cilicia (from c. 363).
- Serras, Stephen, and Heliodorus, bishops of Egypt (from c. 363).
- Philostorgius, historian.

== Notable opponents of Anomoeanism ==
- Basil of Caesarea, bishop of Caesarea, and author of Against Eunomius.
- Gregory of Nazianzus, archbishop of Constantinople, prolific writer and orator. The First Theological Oration. A Preliminary Discourse Against the Eunomians.
- Gregory of Nyssa, bishop of the Cappadocian town of Nyssa and brother to Basil of Caesaria. Against Eunomius (12 books) and Answer to Eunomius' Second Book.

== See also ==
- Archbishop Nectarius of Constantinople
- Homoeans, in contrast to the Anomoeans
- Arianism
- Arian controversy
