= Maris (bishop) =

4th-century Christian Arian leader

Maris (Greek: Μάρις) was a bishop of Chalcedon in the 4th century and a prominent backer of Arianism.

He is best known to history as an attendee present at the Council of Nicaea in 325. He was one of the Arian Bishops at that Council. He eventually signed the Nicene Creed with the other Arian supporters, Zopyrus of Barca, Eusebius of Nicomedia and Theognis of Nicaea. He was exiled with the other three Arian bishops.

He is also notable for confronting the anti-Christian emperor Julian the Apostate in 362 after going blind - in reply to Julian telling him: "Thy Galilean God will not heal thy sight." He replied: "I thank God for depriving me of the power of beholding thy face."
