= Aëtius of Antioch =

Founder of an Arian Christian movement

Aëtius of Antioch (/eɪˈiːʃiəs/; Ancient Greek: Ἀέτιος ὁ Ἀντιοχεύς; Latin: Aëtius Antiochenus; fl. 350), surnamed "the Atheist" by his trinitarian enemies, founder of Anomoeanism, was a native of Coele-Syria.

== Life and writings ==
Aëtius grew up in poverty or slavery. He later worked as a goldsmith in Antioch to support his widowed mother and studied philosophy. After his mother died, Aëtius continued his trade and extended his studies into the Christian scriptures, Christian theology, and medicine.

After working as a vine-dresser and then as a goldsmith, he became a traveling doctor, and displayed great skill in disputations on medical subjects; but his controversial power soon found a wider field for its exercise in the great theological question of the time. He studied successively under the Arians, Athanasius, bishop of Anazarbus, and the presbyter Antonius of Tarsus. In 350 he was ordained a deacon by Leontius of Antioch, but was shortly afterwards forced by the trinitarian party to leave that town. At the first synod of Sirmium he won a dialectic victory over the homoiousian bishops, Basilius and Eustathius, who sought in consequence vainly to stir up against him the enmity of Constantius Gallus. In 356 he went to Alexandria with Eunomius in order to advocate Arianism. Here he is said to have debated Manichean Aphthonius of Alexandria so vigorously that the latter died after the encounter. Aëtius was afterwards banished from Alexandria by Constantius II. Julian recalled him from exile, bestowed upon him an estate in Lesbos, and retained him for a time at his court in Constantinople. Being consecrated a bishop, he used his office in the interests of Arianism by creating other bishops of that party. At the accession of Valens (364), he retired to his estate at Lesbos, but soon returned to Constantinople, where he died in 367.

== Anomoean sect ==
The Anomoean sect of the Arians, of whom he was the leader, are sometimes called after him Aetians. His work De Fide has been preserved in connection with a refutation written by Epiphanius (Haer. lxxvi. 10). Its main thought is that the homoousia, i.e. the doctrine that the Son (therefore the Begotten) is essentially God, is self-contradictory, since the idea of unbegottenness is just that which constitutes the nature of God.

In one of his treatises, Saint Basil the Great writes against the Anomoeans led by Aëtius, whom he describes an instrument in the hands of "the enemy of truth".

== See also ==
- Aetia gens
