= Constantine the Great and Christianity =

Emperor Constantine's relationship, views, and laws regarding Christianity

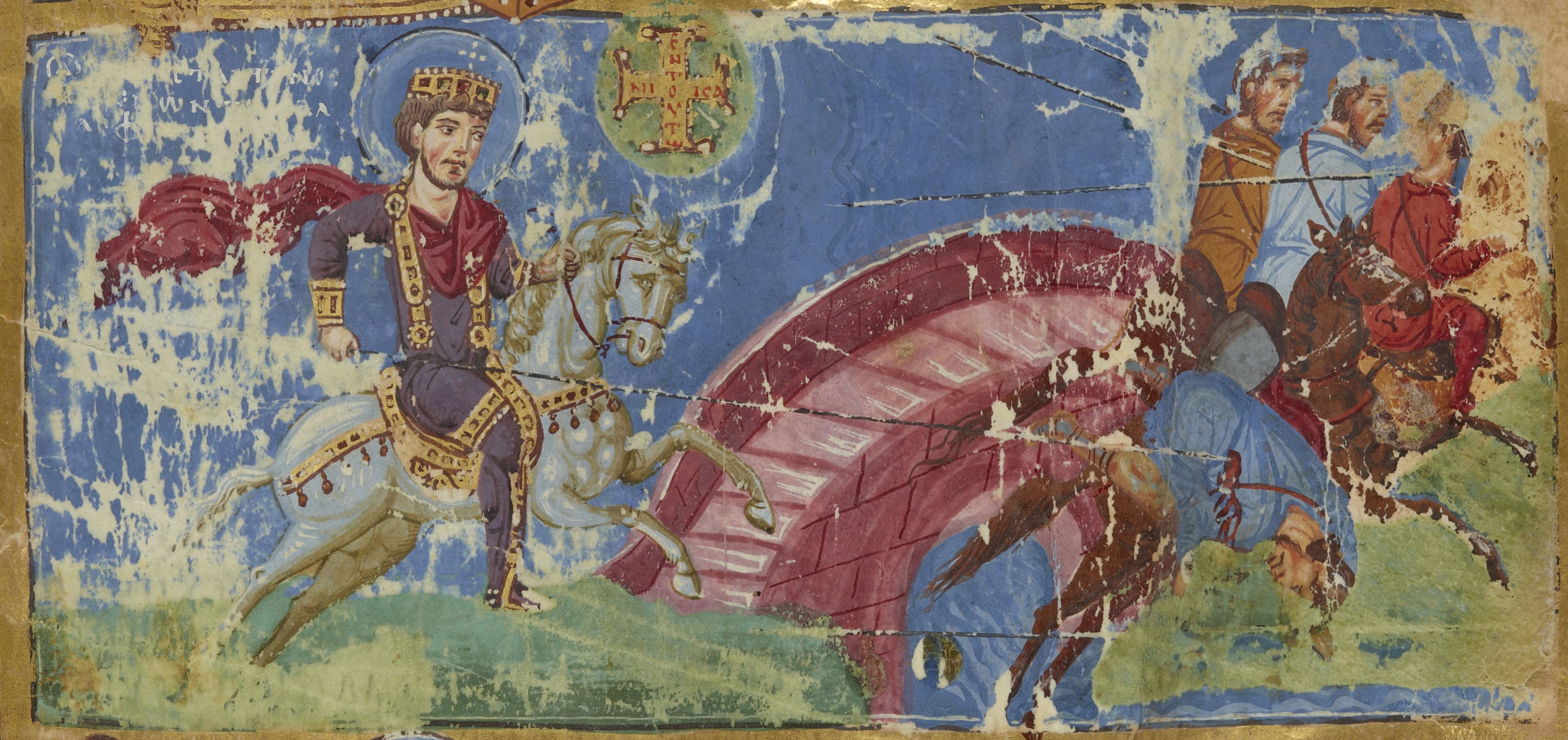
Constantine's vision and the Battle of the Milvian Bridge in a 9th-century Byzantine manuscript.

During the reign of the Roman emperor Constantine the Great (306–337 AD), Christianity began to transition to the dominant religion of the Roman Empire. Historians remain uncertain about Constantine's reasons for favoring Christianity, and theologians and historians have often argued about which form of early Christianity he subscribed to. There is no consensus among scholars as to whether he was raised a Christian, whether he adopted his mother Helena's Christianity in his youth, or whether, as claimed by Eusebius of Caesarea, he encouraged her to convert to the faith he had adopted.

Constantine ruled the Roman Empire as sole emperor for much of his reign. Some scholars allege that his main objective was to gain unanimous approval and submission to his authority from all classes, and therefore he chose Christianity to conduct his political propaganda, believing that it was the most appropriate religion that could fit with the imperial cult. Regardless, under the Constantinian dynasty Christianity expanded throughout the empire, launching the era of the state church of the Roman Empire. Whether Constantine sincerely converted to Christianity or remained loyal to paganism is a matter of debate among historians. His formal conversion in 312 is almost universally acknowledged among historians, despite that it was claimed he was baptized only on his deathbed by the Arian bishop Eusebius of Nicomedia in 337; the real reasons behind it remain unknown and are debated also.

Constantine's decision to cease the persecution of Christians in the Roman Empire was a turning point for early Christianity, sometimes referred to as the Triumph of the Church, the Peace of the Church or the Constantinian shift. In 313, Constantine and Licinius issued the Edict of Milan decriminalizing Christian worship. The emperor became a great patron of the Church and set a precedent for the position of the Christian emperor within the Church and raised the notions of orthodoxy, Christendom, ecumenical councils, and the state church of the Roman Empire declared by edict in 380. He is revered as a saint and isapostolos in the Eastern Orthodox Church, Oriental Orthodox Church, and various Eastern Catholic Churches for his example as a Christian monarch.

== Before Constantine ==
The first recorded official persecution of Christians on behalf of the Roman Empire was in AD 64, when, as reported by the Roman historian Tacitus, Emperor Nero attempted to blame Christians for the Great Fire of Rome. According to Church tradition, it was during the reign of Nero that Peter and Paul were martyred in Rome. However, modern historians debate whether the Roman government distinguished between Christians and Jews prior to Nerva's modification of the Fiscus Judaicus in 96, from which point practising Jews paid the tax and Christians did not.

Christians suffered from sporadic and localized persecutions over a period of two and a half centuries. Their refusal to participate in the imperial cult was considered an act of treason and was thus punishable by execution. The most widespread official persecution was carried out by Diocletian beginning in 303. During the Great Persecution, the emperor ordered Christian buildings and the homes of Christians torn down and their sacred books collected and burned. Christians were arrested, tortured, mutilated, burned, starved, and condemned to gladiatorial contests to amuse spectators. The Great Persecution officially ended in April 311, when Galerius, senior emperor of the Tetrarchy, issued an edict of toleration which granted Christians the right to practice their religion, although it did not restore any property to them. Constantine, caesar in the Western Empire, and Licinius, caesar in the East, also were signatories to the edict. It has been speculated that Galerius' reversal of his long-standing policy of Christian persecution has been attributable to one or both of these co-caesars.

== Constantine's conversion ==
Ancient sources disagree on when and how Constantine became a Christian (although they agree that his father was a Christian). According to Eusebius of Caesarea, Constantine was originally a pagan who did not know much about his father's God, but converted to Christianity shortly before the Battle of the Milvian Bridge in 312, when he saw a vision and a dream about the Labarum. He then converted his mother Helena to Christianity. Eusebius' telling of the events has been described as "awkward" and "incredible". Alternatively, Gelasius of Caesarea and Lactantius state that Constantine's parents had raised him a Christian. They portray the vision and dream near Rome as an event that strengthened Constantine's pre-existing Christianity. Constantine's own statements imply that he was always a Christian, but that his faith was "defective" until it was "confirmed" by a spiritual experience. In any case, he only publicly declared himself a Christian after issuing the Edict of Milan. Writing to Christians, Constantine made clear that he believed that he owed his successes to the protection of the High God alone.

=== Vision of Apollo ===
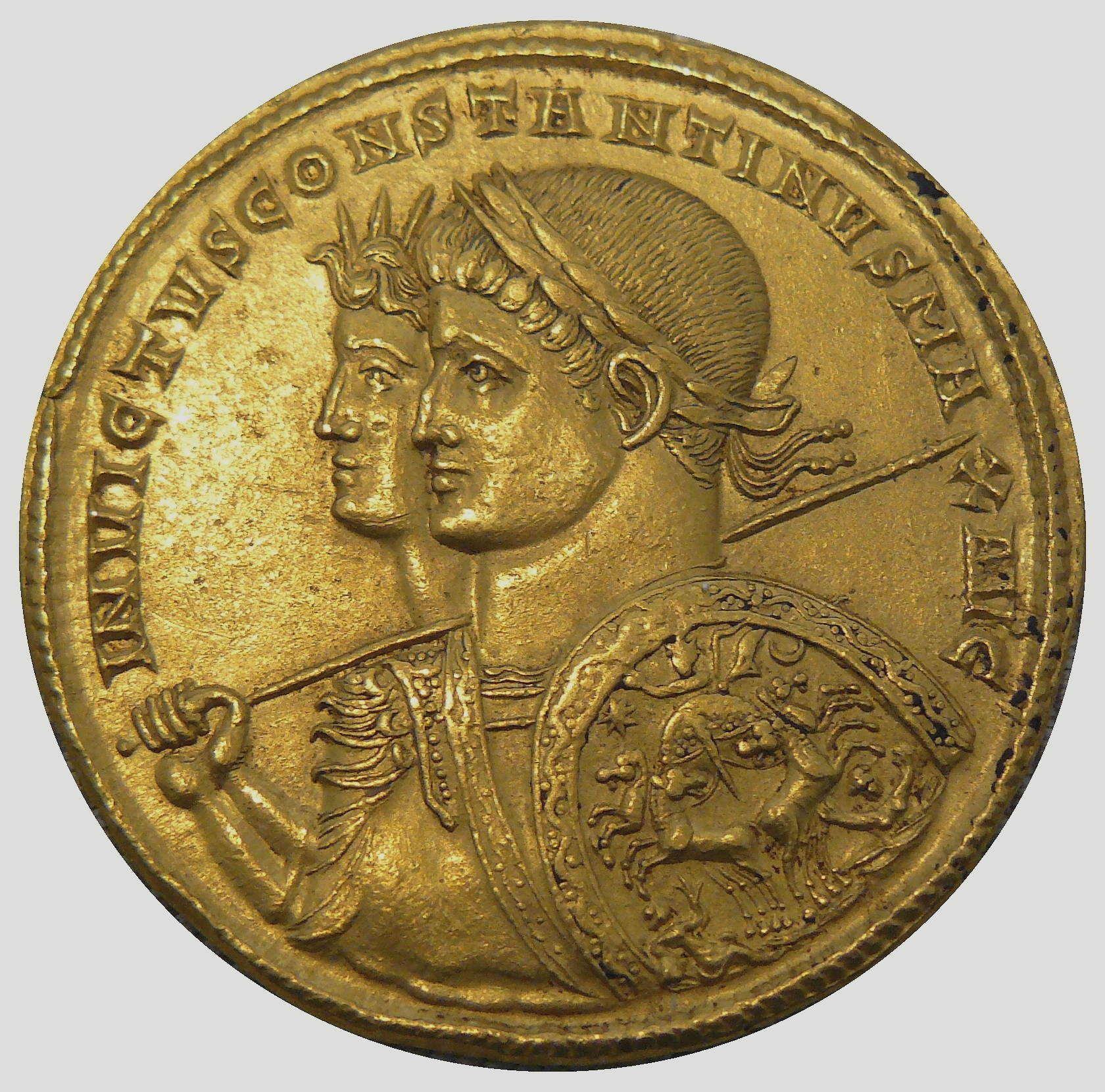
Jugate gold multiple issued by Constantine at Ticinum in 313, showing the emperor and the god Sol, with Sol also depicted in his quadriga on Constantine's shield.

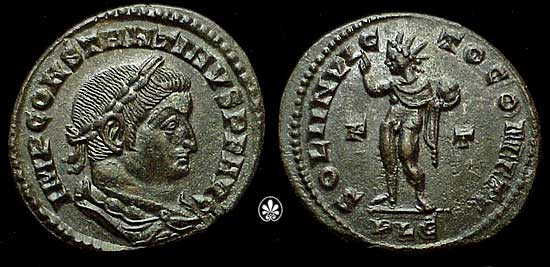
Follis issued by Constantine at Lugdunum c. 309–310, with Sol holding a globe and wearing a radiant crown. Constantine is described as SOLI INVICTO COMITI, 'Companion of Sol Invictus'

In 310 a panegyric, preserved in the Panegyrici Latini collection and delivered at Trier for the joint occasion of the city's birthday and Constantine's quinquennalia, recounted a vision apparently seen by the emperor while journeying between Marseille and Trier. The panegyricist recounts that the god Apollo appeared to Constantine in company with Victoria and together presented him with three wreaths representing thirty years of power. This vision was perhaps in a dream experienced by the emperor while practising incubation at the shrine of Apollo Grannus in Grand, Vosges. Eusebius was aware of this vision, or reports of it, and refers in his own Panegyric of Constantine of 336 to "tricennial crowns" bestowed by the hand of God in Christianity on Constantine, "augmenting the sway of his kingdom by long years".

=== Battle of Milvian Bridge ===
Eusebius of Caesarea and other Christian sources record that Constantine experienced a dramatic series of events sometime between his father Constantius Chlorus's death in 306 and the Battle of the Milvian Bridge on 28 October 312. The battle secured Constantine's claim to the title of augustus in the West, which he had assumed unilaterally when his father died. According to Eusebius' Life of Constantine, Constantine saw a vision of "a cross-shaped trophy formed from light" above the sun at midday.

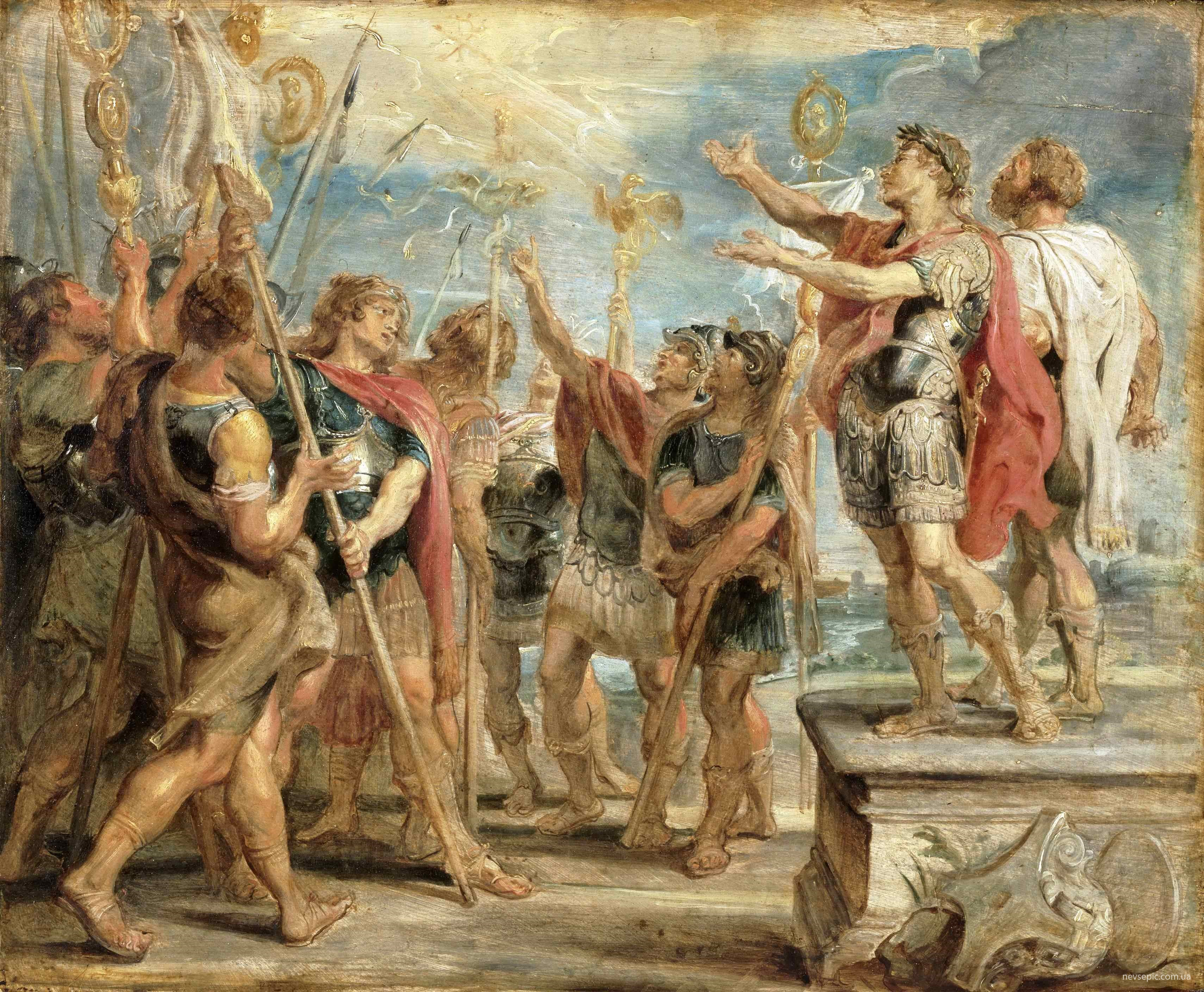
The Emblem of Christ Appearing to Constantine, as imagined by Rubens (1622). Constantine's army sees a chi-rho in the daytime sky.

About the time of the midday sun, when the day was just turning, he said he saw with his own eyes up in the sky and resting over the sun, a cross-shaped trophy formed from light, and a text attached to it which said, "By this conquer." (τούτῳ νίκα) Amazement at the spectacle seized both him and the whole company of soldiers which was then accompanying him on a campaign he was conducting somewhere, and witnessed the miracle.

— Eusebius of Caesarea, Vita Constantini, 1.28.2

The Greek words Ἐν Τούτῳ Νίκα 'in this sign, conquer' are often rendered in Latin as in hoc signo vinces 'in this sign, you will conquer'. According to Eusebius, Constantine also had a dream that same night. In the dream,

the Christ of God appeared to him with the sign which had appeared in the sky, and urged him to make himself a copy of the sign which had appeared in the sky, and to use this as a protection against the attacks of the enemy.

— Eusebius of Caesarea, Vita Constantini, 1.29

Writing his Church History shortly after 313, Eusebius makes no mention of this story in that work and does not recount it until composing his posthumous biography of Constantine decades afterwards. Life of Constantine was written by Eusebius after Constantine had died, and Eusebius admitted that he had heard the story from Constantine long after it had happened. Lactantius, writing 313–315 and around twenty years before Eusebius's Life, also does not mention a vision in the sky. Instead, Lactantius mentions only that Constantine's dream took place on the eve of the climactic battle on the Ponte Milvio across the Tiber, with the crucial detail that the "sign" was marked on the Constantinian soldiers' shields. According to Lactantius:

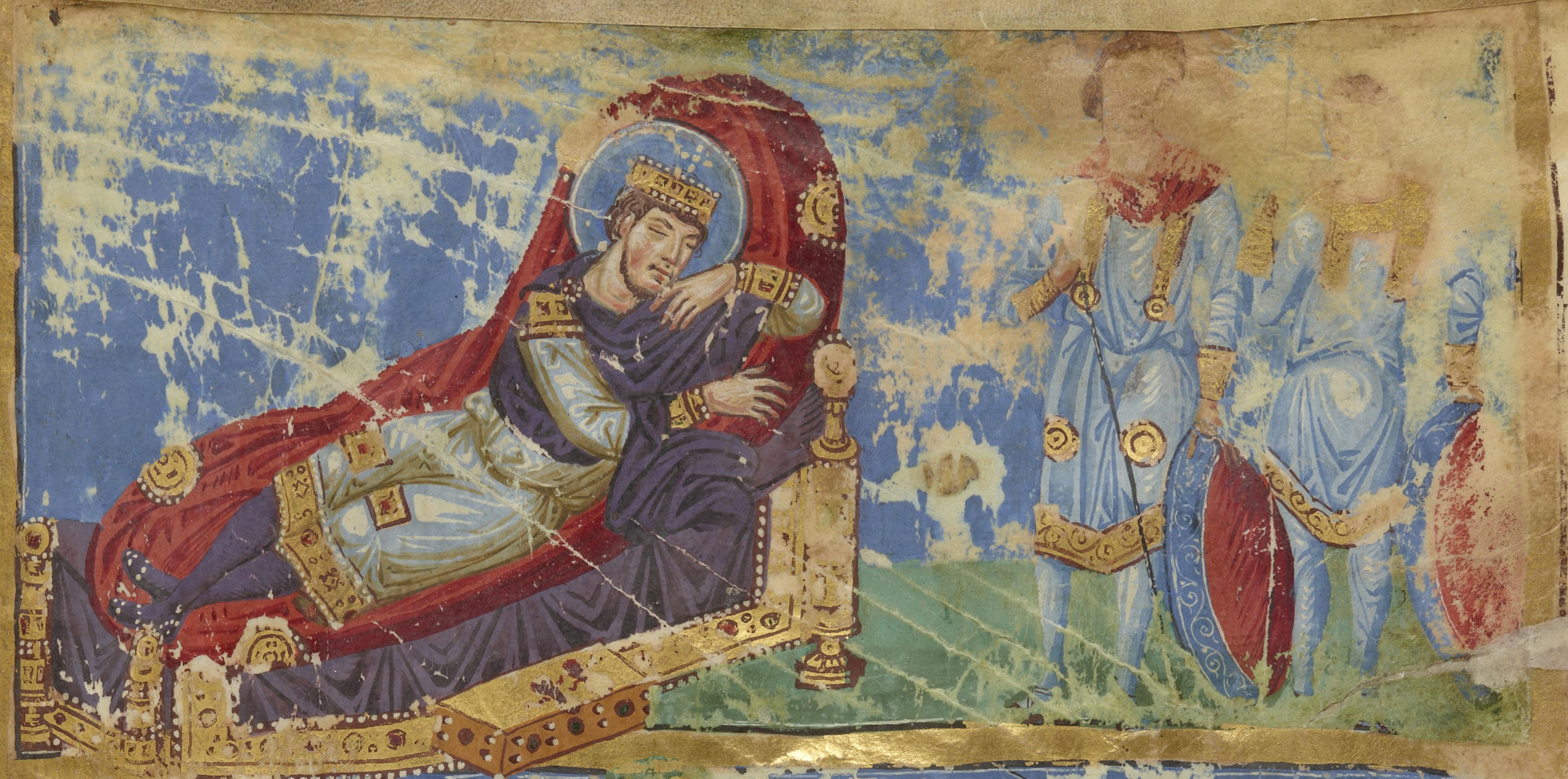
Constantine's dream in a 9th-century Byzantine manuscript

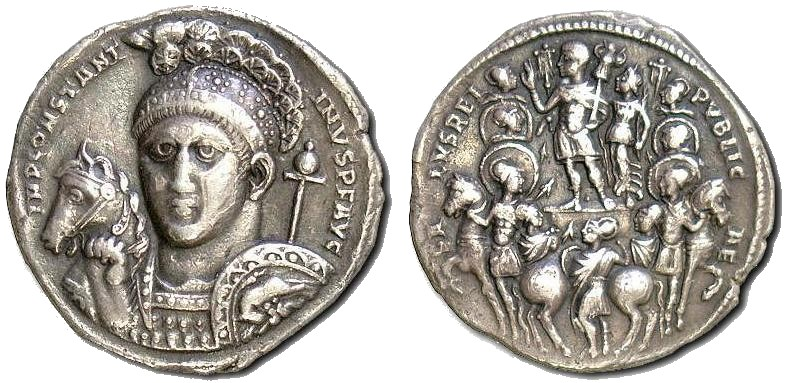
Medallion issued by Constantine at Ticinum in 315, with chi-rho on the emperor's crest and Romulus and Remus and the Lupa on his shield.

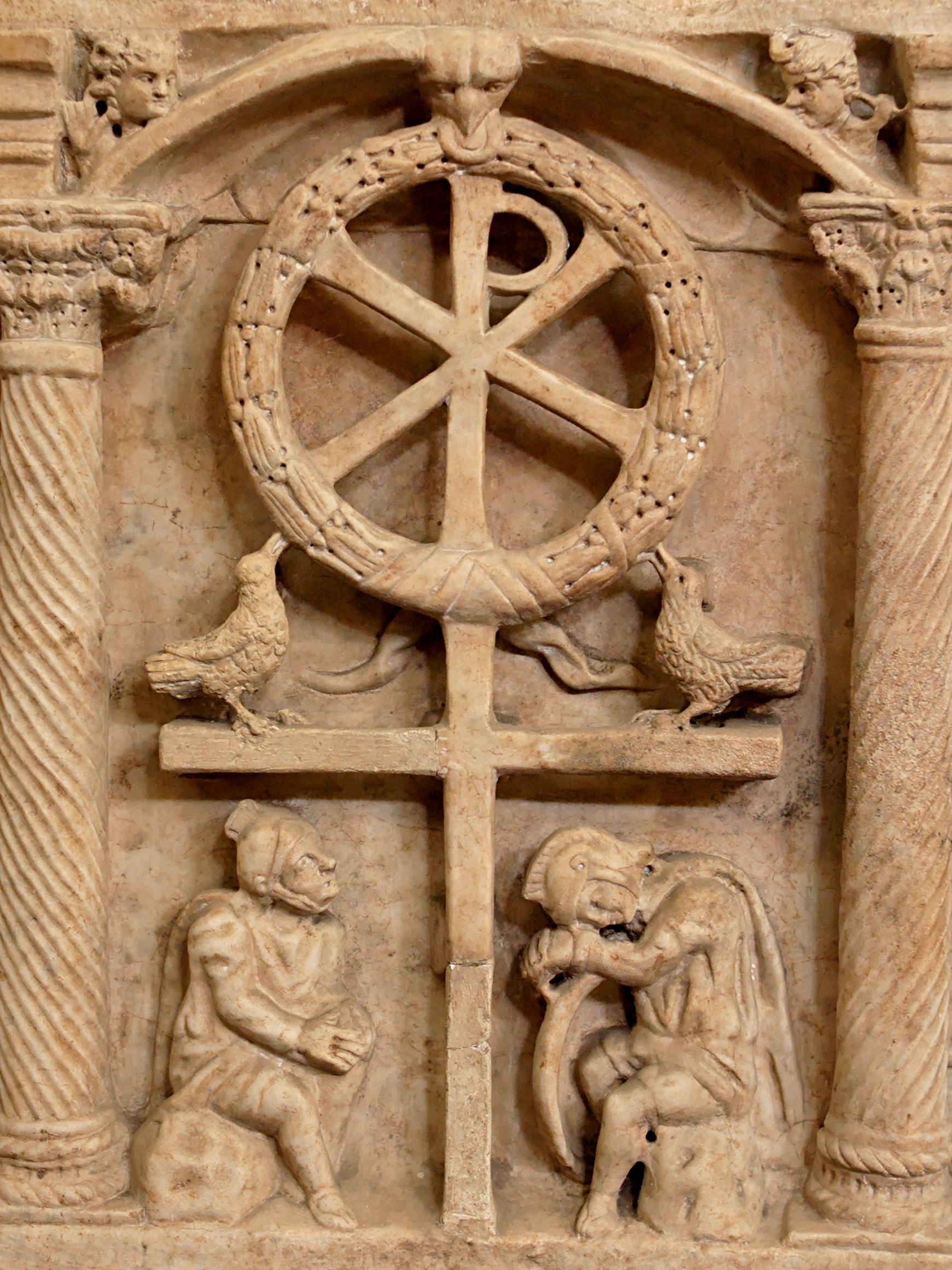
Late Roman sarcophagus with a combined cross and wreathed chi-rho.

Constantine was advised in a dream to mark the heavenly sign of God on the shields of his soldiers and then engage in battle. He did as he was commanded and by means of a letter X turned sideways, with the top of its head bent around (transversa X littera, summo capite circumflexo), he marked Christ on their shields (Christum in scutis notat). Armed with this sign, the army took up its weapons.

— Lactantius, De Mortibus Persecutorum, 44.5–6

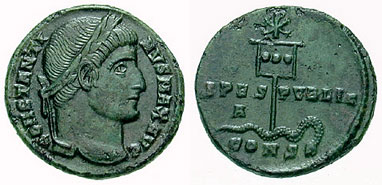
Follis issued by Constantine at Constantinople in 337, with a chi-rho on a labarum.

It is unclear from these sources what Constantine saw and what was marked on his army's shields. Eusebius's description of the daytime vision suggests a cross-shaped (either Τ or †) symbol, whereas Lactantius's description suggests a staurogram (⳨), although the crux ansata (☥) or the Egyptian ankh (𓋹) have been proposed as interpretations as well. All of these symbols were used by Christians in the 3rd and 4th centuries. Eusebius concurs with Lactantius that a new device was added to the shields of Constantine's soldiers' but does not connect this with the Battle of the Milvian Bridge, saying only that the "sign of the saving trophy" was marked, but not specifying when. Sometime after 317, Eusebius was permitted by Constantine, probably either in 325 or in 335, to see a standard that was made according to the emperor's dreamt instructions during the civil war. He described it as:

A tall pole plated with gold had a transverse bar forming the shape of a cross. Up at the extreme top a wreath woven of precious stones and gold had been fastened. On it two letters, imitating by its first characters the name "Christ," formed the monogram of the Saviour's title, rho being intersected in the middle by chi ... From the transverse bar, which was bisected by the pole, hung suspended a cloth ... But the upright pole ... carried the golden head-and-shoulders portrait of the Godbeloved Emperor, and likewise of his sons.

— Eusebius of Caesarea, Vita Constantini, 1.31.1–2

This later description of Eusebius's, written after 324, suggests a more elaborate symbol than does Lactantius's earlier text, involving the Greek letters rho (Ρ) and chi (Χ) ligatured as the chi rho (☧), a monogram of Ancient Greek: χριστός, romanized: khrīstós, lit. 'anointed', referring to Jesus. Possibly Eusebius's description refers to a chi-rho inside the loop of an ankh.

Following the battle and the defeat and death of Maxentius, Constantine became the undisputed emperor in the West and performed an adventus, a ceremonial entrance to the city. Arriving inside Rome's walls he ignored the altars to the gods prepared on the Capitoline Hill and did not carry out the customary sacrifices to celebrate a general's victorious entry into Rome, instead heading directly to the imperial palace. This is probably because the traditional Roman triumph, concluding with the sacrifice to Jupiter Optimus Maximus at his temple on the Capitoline, was traditionally celebrated after victory over Rome's enemies, rather than after the conquest of the city by a claimant in a civil war. The Arch of Constantine, for which numerous reliefs from earlier monuments depicting prior emperors sacrificing to various gods were re-carved with the face of Constantine, does not have an image of Constantine sacrificing to Jupiter, although he is shown sacrificing to Apollo and to Hercules.

=== Edict of Milan ===
In 313 Constantine and Licinius announced "that it was proper that the Christians and all others should have liberty to follow that mode of religion which to each of them appeared best," thereby granting tolerance to all religions, including Christianity. The Edict of Milan went a step further than the earlier Edict of Serdica by Galerius in 311, returning confiscated Church property. This edict made the empire officially neutral with regard to religious worship; it neither made the traditional religions illegal nor made Christianity the state religion, as occurred later with the Edict of Thessalonica of 380. The Edict of Milan did, however, raise the stock of Christianity within the empire and reaffirmed the importance of religious worship to the welfare of the state. Most influential people in the empire, especially high military officials, had not been converted to Christianity and still participated in traditional Roman religion; Constantine's rule exhibited at least a willingness to appease these factions. Coins minted up to eight years after the battle still bore the images of Roman gods. The monuments he first commissioned, such as the Arch of Constantine, contained no reference to Christianity.

== Patronage of the Church ==
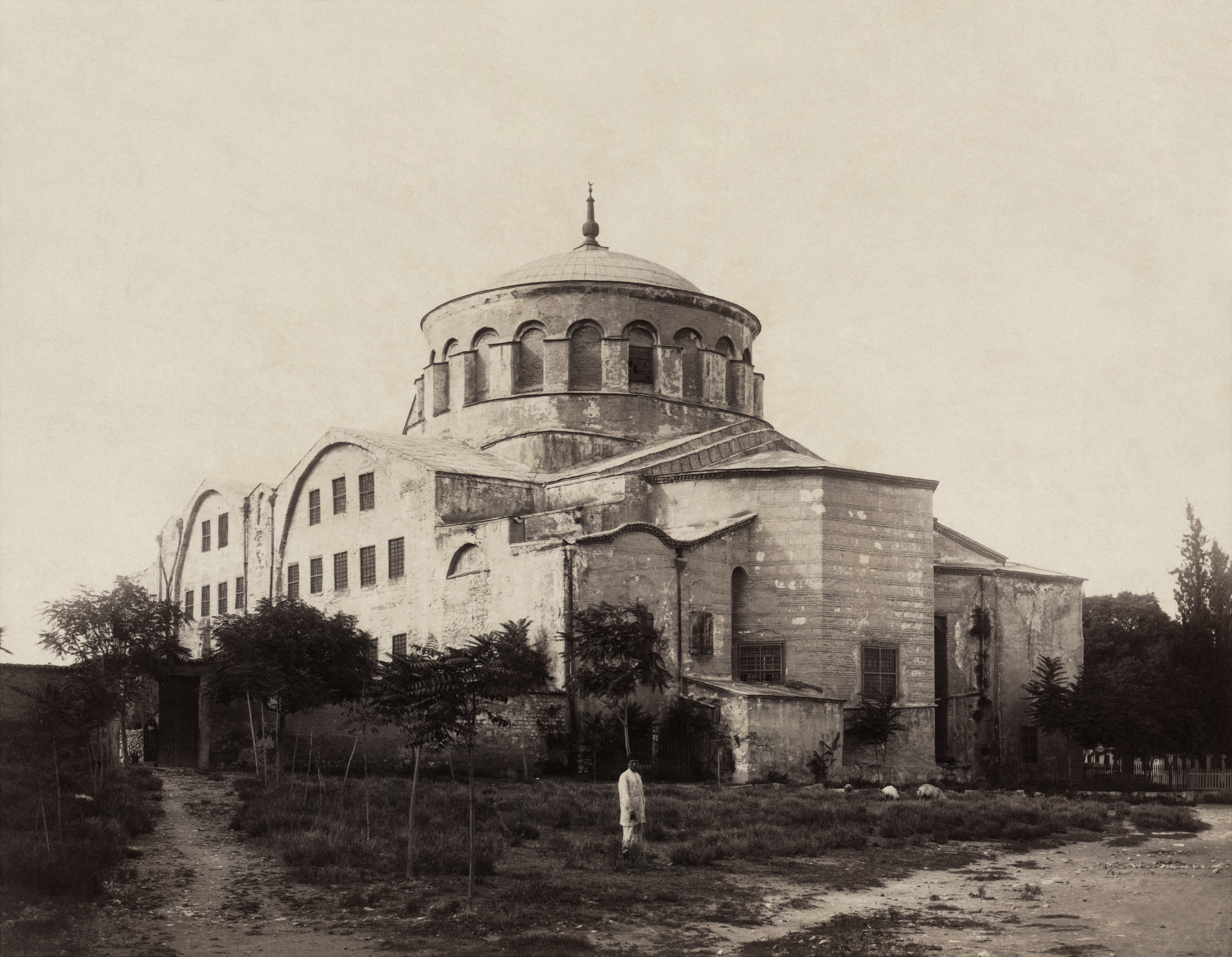
Hagia Eirene was the first church commissioned by Constantine in Constantinople and burned down in the Nika riots. The present structure is 6th century.

The accession of Constantine was a turning point for early Christianity. After his victory, Constantine took over the role of patron of the Christian faith. He supported the Church financially, had a number of basilicas built, granted privileges (e.g., exemption from certain taxes) to clergy, promoted Christians to high-ranking offices, returned property confiscated during the Great Persecution of Diocletian, and endowed the church with land and other wealth. Between 324 and 330, Constantine built a new city, New Rome, at Byzantium on the Bosporos, which would be named Constantinople for him. Unlike "old" Rome, the city began to employ overtly Christian architecture, contained churches within the city walls, and had no pre-existing temples from other religions.

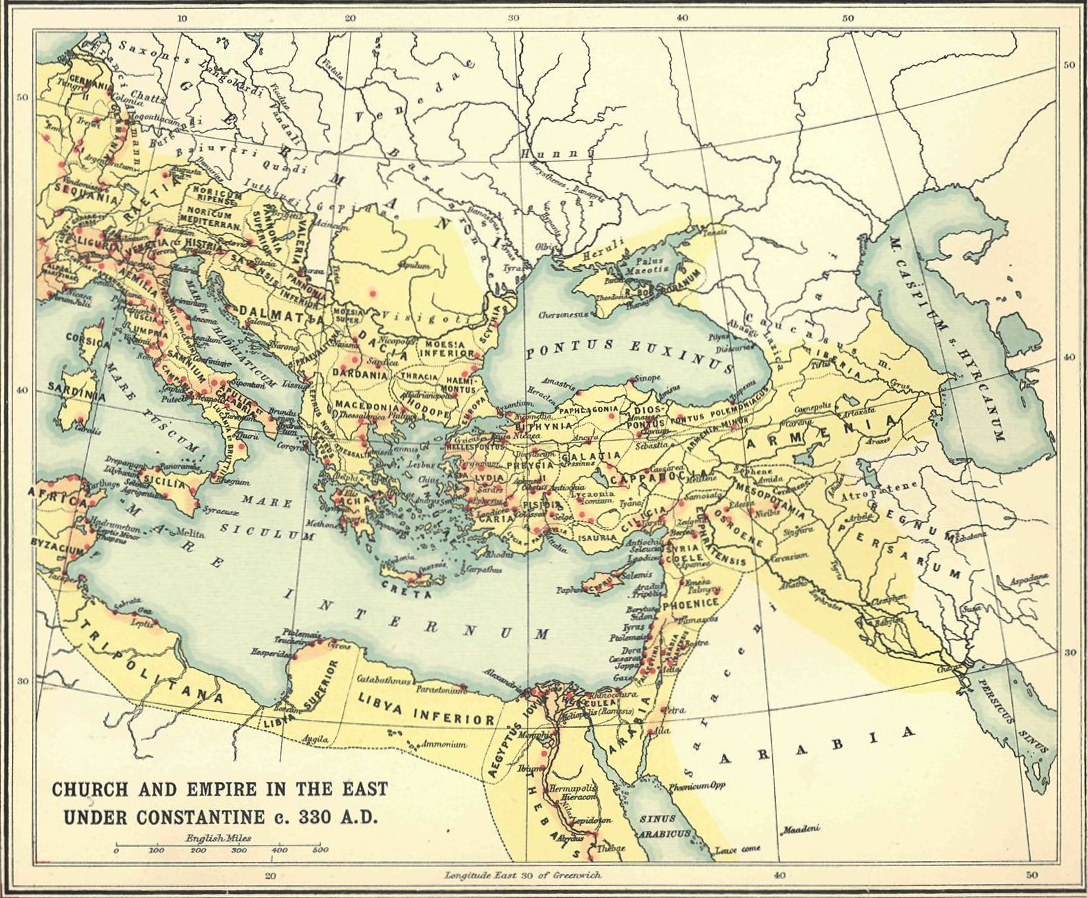
Map of the Church and Empire in the East under Constantine (c. 330 AD).

In doing this, however, Constantine required those who had not converted to Christianity to pay for the new city. Christian chroniclers tell that it appeared necessary to Constantine "to teach his subjects to give up their rites ... and to accustom them to despise their temples and the images contained therein," This led to the closure of temples because of a lack of support, their wealth flowing to the imperial treasure; Constantine did not need to use force to implement this. It was the chronicler Theophanes who added centuries later that temples "were annihilated", but this was considered "not true" by contemporary historians.

Constantine respected cultivated persons, and his court was composed of older, respected, and honored men. Men from leading Roman families who declined to convert to Christianity were denied positions of power yet still received appointments; even up to the end of his life, two-thirds of his top government were non-Christian. Constantine's laws enforced and reflected his Christian attitudes. Crucifixion was abolished for reasons of Christian piety but was replaced with hanging, to demonstrate the preservation of Roman supremacy. On March 7, 321, Sunday, which was sacred to Christians as the day of Christ's resurrection and to the Roman Sun God Sol Invictus, was declared an official day of rest. On that day markets were banned and public offices were closed, except for the purpose of freeing slaves. There were, however, no restrictions on performing farming work on Sundays, which was the work of the great majority of the population.

Some laws made during his reign were even humane in the modern sense and supported tolerance, possibly inspired by his Christianity: a prisoner was no longer to be kept in total darkness but must be given the outdoors and daylight; a condemned man was allowed to die in the arena, but he could not be branded on his "heavenly beautified" face, since God was supposed to have made man in his image, but only on the feet. Publicly displayed gladiatorial games were ordered to be eliminated in 325.

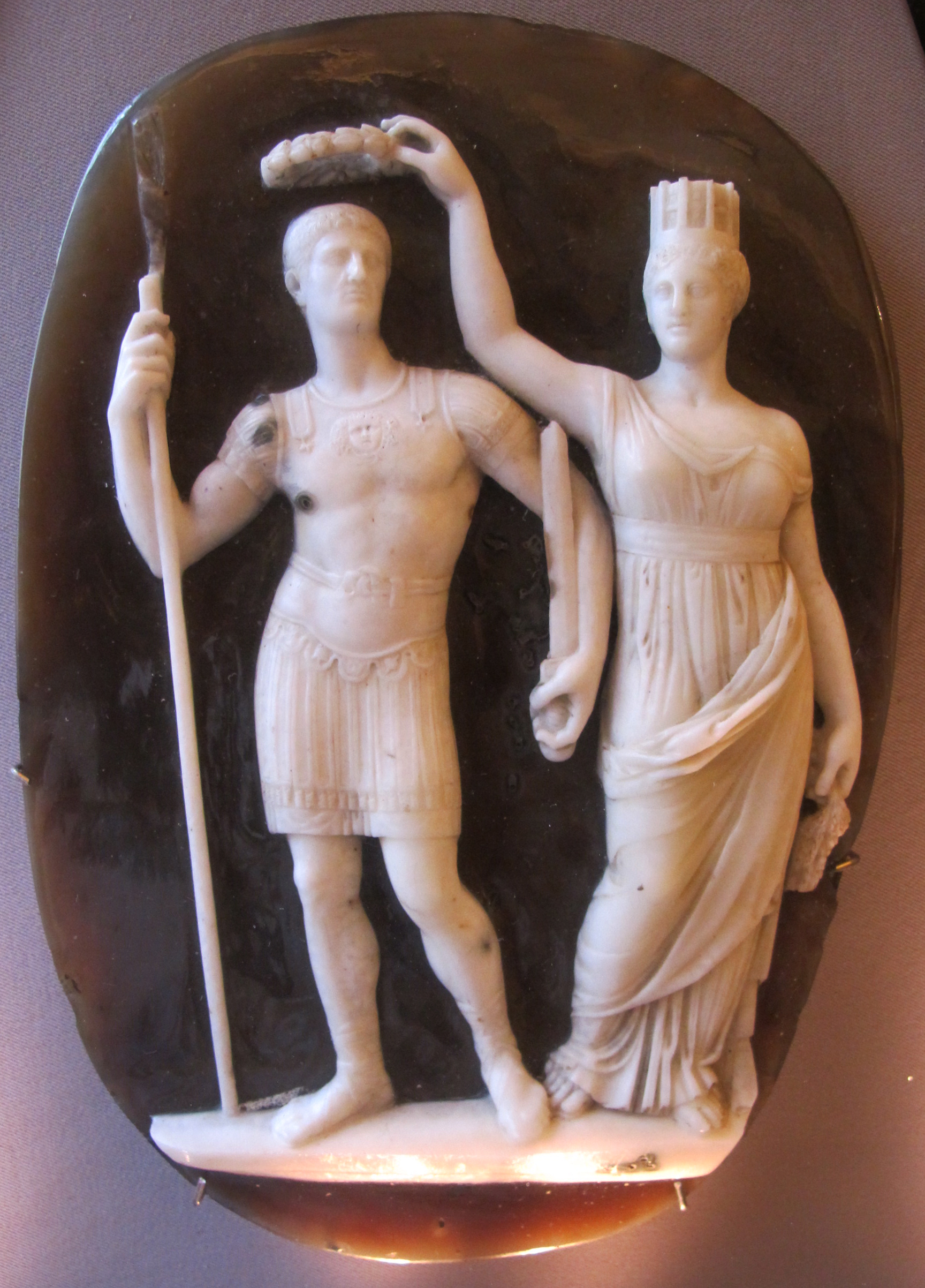
4th-century sardonyx cameo of Constantine crowned by the Tyche of Constantinople

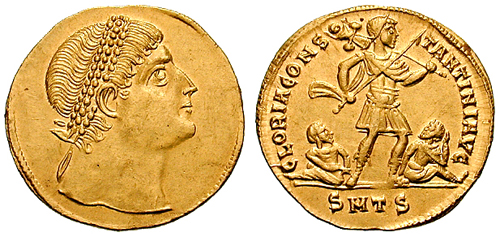
Gold 1½ solidus multiple issued by Constantine at Thessaloniki in 327, with Constantine looking skywards and an armoured emperor carrying a spear and a tropaion with bound captives

=== Early Christian Bibles ===
According to Eusebius, in 331 Constantine had commissioned him to deliver fifty volumes of scriptures for the churches of Constantinople, which were to be bound in leather and easily portable. Only three or four churches are known certainly to have existed in Constantine's reign, but others appear to have been planned or established, for which the scriptures were commissioned. The volumes were likely gospel books containing the Canonical Gospels of the Four Evangelists rather than complete Bibles with the entire Biblical canon, which were very rare in antiquity.

Athanasius (Apol. Const. 4) recorded around 340 Alexandrian scribes preparing Bibles for Constans. Little else is known. It has been speculated that this may have provided motivation for canon lists, and that Codex Vaticanus and Codex Sinaiticus are examples of these Bibles. Together with the Peshitta and Codex Alexandrinus, these are the earliest extant Christian Bibles.

=== Church construction ===
Out of all the Roman emperors, Constantine was one of the most prolific builders of both secular and religious buildings. In Constantinople, some of the churches whose constructions are attributed to Constantine include the Church of Hagia Irene, the Church of the Holy Apostles, the Church of Saint Mocius, the Church of Saint Acacius, the Church of Saint Menas, the Church of Saint Agathonicus, the Church of Saint Michael, and the Church of Hagios Dynamis.

In Rome, Constantine and his mother Helena built many churches, including the Church of Saint John Lateran, Santa Croce in Gerusalemme, Old St. Peter's Basilica, Santi Marcellino e Pietro al Laterano, Sant'Agnese fuori le mura, San Sebastiano fuori le mura, and San Lorenzo fuori le mura. Constantine also had churches built elsewhere in Italy, like in Naples, Ostia, Capua and Albanum.

The third of Constantine and Helena's major church-building projects was in the Holy Land. The churches they built there include the Church of the Holy Sepulchre, the Church of the Nativity, the Church of Eleona, the Golden Octagon in Antioch, and a church in Mamre near an oak tree believed to be where God spoke to Abraham and Jesus taught his disciples.

== Christian emperorship ==
=== Enforcement of doctrine ===
The reign of Constantine established a precedent for the position of the Christian emperor in the Church. Emperors considered themselves responsible to the gods for the spiritual health of their subjects, and after Constantine they had a duty to help the Church define and maintain orthodoxy. The Church generally regarded the definition of doctrine as the responsibility of the bishops; the emperor's role was to enforce doctrine, root out heresy, and uphold ecclesiastical unity. The emperor ensured that God was properly worshiped in his empire; what proper worship (orthodoxy) and doctrines and dogma consisted of was for the Church to determine.

Constantine had become a worshiper of the Christian God, but he found that there were many opinions on that worship and indeed on who and what that God was. In 316, Constantine was asked to adjudicate in a North African dispute of the Donatist sect (who began by refusing obedience to any bishops who had yielded in any way to persecution, later regarding all bishops but their own sect as utterly contaminated). More significantly, in 325 he summoned the First Council of Nicaea, effectively the first ecumenical council (unless the Council of Jerusalem is so classified). The Council of Nicaea is the first major attempt by Christians to define orthodoxy for the whole state. Until Nicaea, all previous Church councils had been local or regional synods affecting only portions of the Church.

Nicaea dealt primarily with the Arian controversy. Constantine was torn between the Arian and Trinitarian camps. After the Nicene council, and against its conclusions, he eventually recalled Arius from exile and banished Athanasius of Alexandria to Trier.

Just before his death in May 337, it is claimed that Constantine was baptised into Christianity. Up until this time he had been a catechumen for most of his adult life. He believed that if he waited to get baptized on his death bed he was in less danger of polluting his soul with sin and not getting to heaven. He was baptized by his distant relative Arian Bishop Eusebius of Nicomedia or by Pope Sylvester I which is maintained by the Catholic Church, the Coptic Orthodox Church, the Antiochian Orthodox Church, the Greek Orthodox Church, the Russian Orthodox Church, the Serbian Orthodox Church, upon by many other Eastern Orthodox, Church of the East, and Oriental Orthodox Churches. During Eusebius of Nicomedia's time in the imperial court, the Eastern court and the major positions in the Eastern Church were held by Arians or Arian sympathizers. With the exception of a short period of eclipse, Eusebius enjoyed the complete confidence both of Constantine and Constantius II and was the tutor of Emperor Julian the Apostate. After Constantine's death, his son and successor Constantius II was an Arian, as was Emperor Valens.

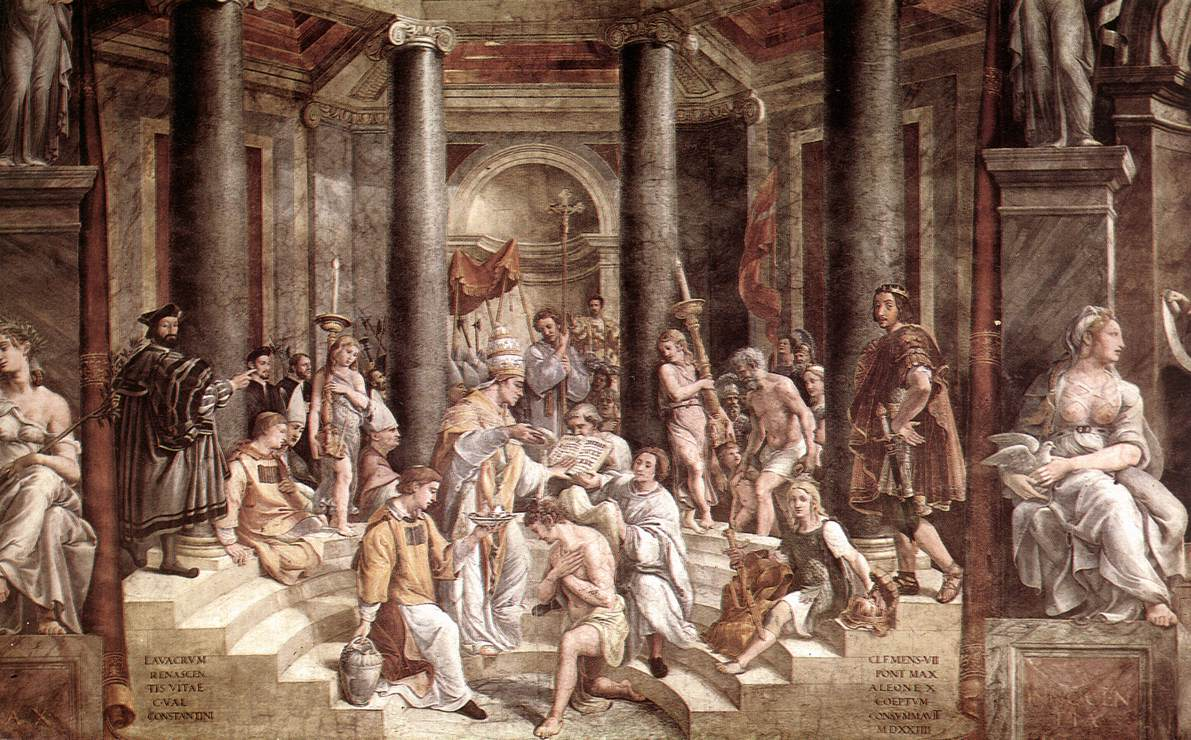
Raphael's The Baptism of Constantine.

According to Hans Pohlsander, professor emeritus of history at the State University of New York at Albany, Constantine's conversion was a matter of realpolitik, meant to serve his political interest in keeping the empire united under his control

The prevailing spirit of Constantine's government was one of conservatism. His conversion to and support of Christianity produced fewer innovations than one might have expected; indeed they served an entirely conservative end, the preservation and continuation of the Empire.

— Hans Pohlsander, The Emperor Constantine

Although this interpretation was common among 19th century historians, it is no longer the scholarly consensus. Other historians have argued that Constantine's actions are far more consistent with genuine belief in Christianity than political opportunism. Historian Harold A. Drake wrote "I see no reason to doubt the sincerity of Constantine's conversion to Christianity".

=== Suppression of other religions ===
Constantine's position on the religions traditionally practiced in Rome evolved during his reign. In fact, his coinage and other official motifs, until 325, had affiliated him with the pagan cult of Sol Invictus. At first, Constantine encouraged the construction of new temples and tolerated traditional sacrifices; by the end of his reign, he had begun to order the pillaging and tearing down of Roman temples.

Beyond the limes, east of the Euphrates, the Sasanian rulers, perennially at war with Rome, had usually tolerated Christianity. Constantine is said to have written to Shapur II in 324 and urged him to protect Christians under his rule. With the establishment of Catholicism as the state religion of the Roman Empire, Christians in Persia would be regarded as allies of Persia's ancient enemy. According to an anonymous Christian account, Shapur II wrote to his generals:

You will arrest Simon, chief of the Christians. You will keep him until he signs this document and consents to collect for us a double tax and double tribute from the Christians ... for we Gods have all the trials of war and they have nothing but repose and pleasure. They inhabit our territory and agree with Caesar, our enemy.

— Shapur II, A History of Christianity in Asia: Beginnings to 1500

== Relationship with Arianism ==
Constantine was a vehement Nicene Christian, and made great efforts to end the schisms in the Church, such as the Donatist schism, the Melitian schism, and later the Arian schism. He believed that Arianism was a "blasphemy" and amounted to a "denial of the faith", since it removed the possibility that Christ could be a Redeemer. Shortly after the Council of Nicaea in 325, Constantine had several Arians (including Euzoius of Antioch and Arius himself) exiled from Alexandria. He later also banished Eusebius of Nicomedia and Theognis of Nicaea for sheltering them, even though those two bishops had signed the Nicene Creed.

On 1 September 326, Constantine passed a law against Arians. Less than three months later, on 27 November, he sent a letter to Arius, summoning him to his Court so that he can renounce his Arianism and subscribe to the Nicene Creed. Arius apparently acquiesced, and Constantine in turn attempted to persuade Pope Alexander I of Alexandria to have him restored to the Church. When Alexander refused, Constantine summoned a council, which met at either Nicaea or Nicomedia in 327. This council judged that Arius and Euzoius had renounced their heresy and accepted the Nicene formula, and therefore should be readmitted to the Church. Eusebius and Theognis also asked this council to be reinstated, and were returned to their sees.

In 328, Pope Alexander died and was succeeded by Pope Athanasius, who continued Alexander's policy of defying the 327 council by not readmitting Arius. For a few years, Constantine allowed this and protected Athanasius, who had probably convinced him that Arius and his followers were only pretending to renounce their beliefs. Constantine was on such good terms with Athanasius that, when the Melitians brought numerous accusations against Athanasius to him in 330, he sided with Athanasius and humiliated them. Arius was frustrated by this situation, and in 333 he wrote letters of protest to Athanasius and Constantine. Athanasius seized on something Arius had written in these letters to have him re-excommunicated as a heretic. Constantine followed this by passing anti-Arian laws once again, and by writing a fiercely hostile letter "to Arius and the Arians with him", which one historian described as "six pages of abuse, ridicule, and vituperation" against them and their theology. In 333 or 334, the Melitians held a council in Caesarea to condemn Athanasius, bringing several accusations against him, but once again Constantine sided with Athanasius.

However, between 334 and 335, Constantine seems to have gotten tired of defending Athanasius. In 335 Athanasius' enemies (led by Eusebius of Nicomedia) convinced Constantine to convoke a council in Tyre to settle their dispute. The council ruled that Athanasius should be removed from his see, Constantine having seemingly approved of this decision in advance. Athanasius fled from the council on a raft with five Egyptian bishops and went to Constantinople, where he met Constantine. The next day, he set out for exile in Augusta Treverorum (modern day Trier) in Gaul. Athanasius' exile shocked Egypt, resulting in widespread protests. When the celebrated monk Anthony the Great wrote a petition to Constantine requesting Athanasius' return, Constantine replied that the decisions of the Synod of Tyre must be respected, and that Athanasius was "contumelious and arrogant, and the cause of dissension and sedition".

Meanwhile, the bishops who convened at Tyre went to Jerusalem to attend the dedication of the Church of the Holy Sepulchre. In Jerusalem, they held another synod which judged that Arius should be readmitted to communion with the Church. With his exile now lifted, Arius triumphantly returned to Alexandria, but when this caused problems Constantine exiled him again and he died soon afterwards. In 337, Constantine was in Helenopolis when he became ill and felt that he would die soon. He therefore summoned Eusebius of Nicomedia and was baptised by him on the Feast of the Ascension. He died ten days later on the day of Pentecost (22 May).

Constantine's actions near the end of his life, namely his exile of Athanasius, restoration of Arius to communion, and baptism by an Arian bishop, have been interpreted in many different ways by various historians. Some, inluding Timothy Barnes, have argued that Constantine was misled by Eusebius of Nicomedia away from the doctrine of Nicaea. Eduard Schwartz considered Constantine a political opportunist, Norman H. Baynes considered him steadily Catholic, and Harold A. Drake believed that Constantine preferred unity over doctrinal purity. T. G. Elliott believed that Constantine and Athanasius did not disagree on theology. He points out that, unlike the other bishops he exiled, Constantine never appointed a replacement for Athanasius after exiling him. In fact, he also exiled Athanasius' Melitian rival John Arkhaph to prevent him from taking advantage of Athanasius' absence. Elliott also notes that Eusebius had signed the Nicene Creed in both 325 and 327, cleared himself of the suspicion of Arianism, and simply happened to be the local bishop where Constantine died.

== Constantinian shift ==
Constantinian shift is a term used by some theologians and historians of antiquity to describe the political and theological aspects and outcomes of the 4th-century process of Constantine's integration of the imperial government with the Catholic Church that began with the First Council of Nicaea. The term was popularized by the Mennonite theologian John H. Yoder. The claim that there ever was a Constantinian shift has been disputed; Peter Leithart argues that there was a "brief, ambiguous 'Constantinian moment' in the fourth century," but that there was "no permanent, epochal 'Constantinian shift'."

== See also ==
- Constantinianism
- Bishops of Rome under Constantine the Great
- Christian pacifism
- Labarum
- List of rulers who converted to Christianity
- Philip the Arab and Christianity

== Sources ==
- Bardill, Jonathan; Bardill (2012). Constantine, Divine Emperor of the Christian Golden Age. Cambridge University Press. pp. 159–170. ISBN 978-0-521-76423-0.
- Brown, Peter (18 December 2012). The Rise of Western Christendom: Triumph and Diversity, A.D. 200–1000. Making of Empire. Vol. 3 (10th Anniversary Revised ed.). Wiley. ISBN 978-1-118-33884-1.
- Drake, H. A. (2017). "Constantine and Religious Extremism". In Siecienski, A. Edward (ed.). Constantine: Religious Faith and Imperial Policy. London: Routledge. pp. 11–26. ISBN 978-1-4724-5413-3.
- Elliott, Thomas George (1996). The Christianity of Constantine the Great. ISBN 978-0940866591.
- Gonzalez, Justo (1984). The Story of Christianity. Vol. 1. Harper Collins. p. 176. ISBN 0-060-63315-8.
- Holloway, R. Ross (2004). Constantine & Rome. Yale University Press. p. 14. ISBN 978-0-300-10043-3.
- Jones, Arnold Hugh Martin (1978) [1948]. Constantine and the Conversion of Europe (1962 ed.). University of Toronto Press (reprint 2003) [Macmillan: Teach Yourself History, 1948, Medieval Academy of America: Reprint for Teaching, 1978]. ISBN 978-0-8020-6369-4.
