= Tobi (month) =

- Native name: Coptic: Ⲧⲱⲃⲓ
- Calendar: Coptic calendar
- Month number: 5
- Number of days: 30
- Gregorian equivalent: January–February

Tobi (Coptic: Ⲧⲱⲃⲓ, Tōbi), also known as Tybi (Ancient Greek: Τυβί, Tybí) and Tubah (Arabic: طوبه), is the fifth month of the ancient Egyptian and Coptic calendars. It lies between January 9 and February 7 of the Gregorian calendar.

The month of Tobi is also the first month of the season of Proyet (Growth and Emergence) in Ancient Egypt, where the Nile floods recede and the crops start to grow throughout the land of Egypt.

== Name ==
The name of the month of Tobi comes from Amso Khem, a form of the Ancient Egyptian God Amun Ra.

== Description ==
Toubeh, (the ancient Tobi) : the 5th Coptic month. Corn and flax should be cleared from weeds, and land that is to be devoted to cotton, sesame, and summer cucurbita, is prepared until the 1st of Amshir. Land destined for the growth of culcas (colocasia), and sugar, should be inundated. Lands found to be uncultivable should be marked out and declared unproductive, in order that they may be exempt from taxation. The first cutting of sugar cane takes place (hasab er-rcis) -. sufficient being left for seed, viz : — one kirat in every feddan. At the end of the month work in canals and dykes should be taken in hand : and much care should be bestowed upon the repairing of sakhiehs ( water wheels), wells, &c. The Nile water is in its clearest and best state in Toubeh, and cisterns should be now filled in Cairo and all large towns. The flesh of sheep is better now than at any other season. Vegetables, especially carrots, are at their best. Horses and mules should be tethered in bersim, and it is now time for the sale of cattle. S. winds (Siba) are more prevalent than N. (Dabour). Taxes are now collected. There are various popular sayings respecting Toubeh, — e. g. that if rain falls on any of the first eleven days, but especially on the Festival of the Epiphany, it is a certain sign of good crops. The fellah says " Yfra en Nusrani" (the Christian is happy ) and asserts that God is contented with his people, and will reward them with a bounteous harvest.

== Coptic Synaxarium of the month of Tobi ==
Coptic	Julian	Gregorian	Commemorations
Tobi 1	December 27	January 9	Martyrdom of St. Stephen, the Archdeacon.; Martyrdom of St. Leontius.; Martyrdom of Aesculapius and Dioscorus of Akhmim
Tobi 2	December 28	January 10	Departure of St. Theonas, the 16th Pope of Alexandria.; Martyrdom of St. Callinicus (Gallinicus), Bishop of Letopolis.
Tobi 3	December 29	January 11	Commemoration of the Slain Children of Bethlehem by the Order of Herod the Great.
Tobi 4	December 30	January 12	Departure of St. John the Evangelist.
Tobi 5	December 31	January 13	Martyrdom of St. Eusignius the Soldier.
Tobi 6	January 1	January 14	Commemoration of the Circumcision of the Lord Christ.; Ascension of Elijah, the Prophet.; Departure of St. Marcianus, the 8th Pope of Alexandria.; Departure of St. Basil the Great, Bishop of Caesarea.
Tobi 7	January 2	January 15	Departure of St. Silvester, Bishop of Rome
Tobi 8	January 3	January 16	Consecration of the Church of St. Macarius; Departure of St. Andronicus, the 37th Pope of Alexandria; Departure of St. Benjamin, the 38th Pope of Alexandria
Tobi 9	January 4	January 17	Departure of St. Abraam, friend of St. George (Ga'orgi) of Scetes; Departure of Bishop Karas, the 1st Bishop of the United States
Tobi 10	January 5	January 18	Paramouni of Holy Theophany.; Departure of St. Demetrius II, the 111th Pope of Alexandria.; Commemoration of St. Justus, disciple of St. Samuel
Tobi 11	January 6	January 19	Holy Theophany of Our Lord, God and Savior, Jesus Christ (Baptism of the Lord).
Tobi 12	January 7	January 20	Commemoration of Michael, the Archangel.; Martyrdom of St. Theodore El-Mishreke (the Oriental).; Martyrdom of St. Anatole (Anatolius).
Tobi 13	January 8	January 21	Commemoration of the Miracle at Cana.; Departure of St. Theophilus, the Monk.; Martyrdom of St. Demiana.
Tobi 14	January 9	January 22	Martyrdom of St. Mohrael.; Departure of St. Archiledis (Arselidas).; Departure of St. Maximus, Brother of St. Domatius, sons of the Roman Emperor Valentinian I.
Tobi 15	January 10	January 23	Departure of Obadiah, the Prophet.
Tobi 16	January 11	January 24	Martyrdom of St. Philotheus.; Departure of St. John IV, the 48th Pope of Alexandria.
Tobi 17	January 12	January 25	Departure of St. Domatius, Brother of St. Maximus, sons of the Roman Emperor Valentinian I.; Departure of St. Yousab el-Abbah, Bishop of Girga.
Tobi 18	January 13	January 26	Departure of St. James, Bishop of Nisibis.
Tobi 19	January 14	January 27	Discovery of the Relics of St. Abahor (Pihour) St. Bisoura (Pisoura) & their Mother St. Ampira (Asra).
Tobi 20	January 15	January 28	Departure of St. Prochorus, one of the Seventy Disciples.; Commemoration of the Consecration of the Church of St. John, the Owner of the Golden Gospel, and the Transfer of His Relics to It.; Commemoration of the Martyrdom of St. Behna (Bahnou) and St. Kloag (Bagoug), the Priest.
Tobi 21	January 16	January 29	Commemoration of the Holy Virgin Saint Mary, the Mother of God (Theotokos); Departure of St. Hilaria, Daughter of Emperor Zeno.; Departure of St. Gregory of Nyssa, Brother of St. Basil the Great.
Tobi 22	January 17	January 30	Departure of St. Anthony the Great.
Tobi 23	January 18	January 31	Martyrdom of St. Timothy, the Apostle.; Departure of St. Cyril IV, the 110th Pope of Alexandria.
Tobi 24	January 19	February 1	Departure of St. Mary the Ascetic (The Shut-In).; Martyrdom of St. Bisada (Psati), the Priest.
Tobi 25	January 20	February 2	Departure of St. Peter, the Worshipper.; Martyrdom of St. Askala (Asela), the Ascetic.
Tobi 26	January 21	February 3	Martyrdom of the Forty-Nine Saints, the Elders of Scetis.; Departure of St. Anastasia.; Martyrdom of St. Bagoosh, & his mother.
Tobi 27	January 22	February 4	Martyrdom of St. Sarapion.; Commemoration of Sariel, the Archangel.; Relocation of the Relics of St. Timothy, the Apostle.; Martyrdom of St. Phoebammon (Abu-Fam), the Soldier.
Tobi 28	January 23	February 5	Martyrdom of St. Clement.; Martyrdom of St. Anba Kaou.
Tobi 29	January 24	February 6	Departure of St. Eksani (St. Xene).; Commemoration of St. Seriakos (Syriacus), the Fighter.
Tobi 30	January 25	February 7	Martyrdom of Sts. Pistis, Helpis, Agape, & their Mother Sophia.; Departure of St. Andrews the Samuelite.

== See also ==
- Islamic calendar
