= Constantinianism =

View in Christian politics

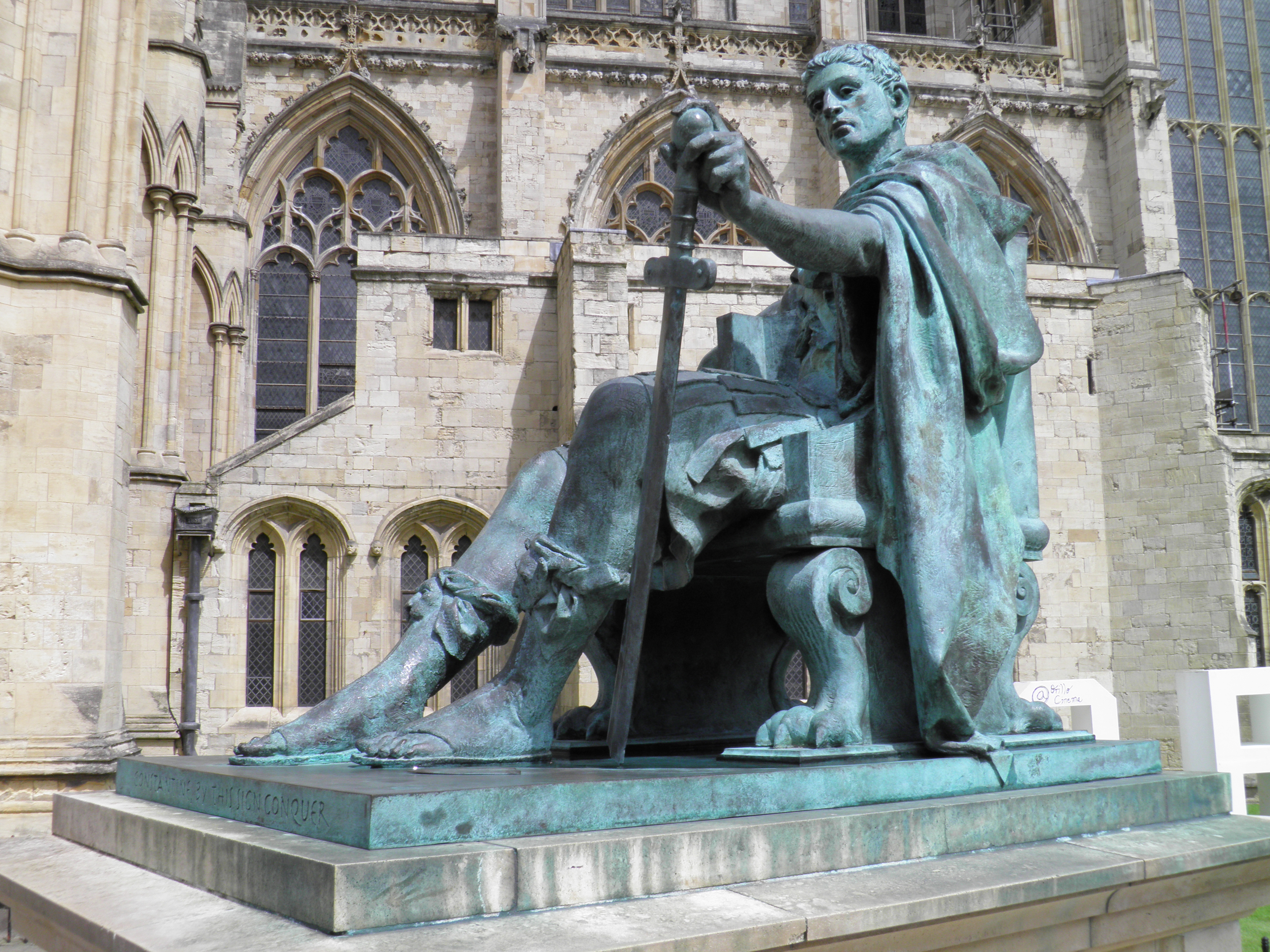
Statue of Constantine the Great, York

Constantinianism is a religiopolitical ideology in Christian politics that epitomizes the unity of church and state, as opposed to separation of church and state. This view is modeled after an ideal Christendom, which arose during the reign of Constantine the Great.

Contemporary theologians have used the term to characterize a view that Christians should readily participate in liberal democracies.

== Meaning ==
Fundamentally, the Constantinian view deeply identifies the Church and state, taking inspiration from the Roman Empire following the Edict of Milan. Some elements of this identification are willingness by the church to use coercive power structures of the state and a tendency towards Christian triumphalism.

== Criticism ==
Stanley Hauerwas argues against a Constantinian view, saying that it leads to a compromised form of Christian ethics, "[It] leads Christians to judge their ethical positions, not on the basis of what is faithful to our particular tradition, but rather on the basis of how much Christian ethics Caesar can be induced to swallow."

John Howard Yoder and Karl Barth have been identified as an anti-Constantinian due to their shared "church-world" distinction.

== See also ==
- Christian right
- Constantine the Great and Christianity
- Constantinian shift
- Christendom
- Donation of Constantine
- History of Christian thought on persecution and tolerance
- Dominion Theology
