= Diocese of Memphis =

Diocese of Memphis may refer to:

- Ancient Diocese of Memphis in Egypt
- Roman Catholic Diocese of Memphis in Tennessee
