= Roman Christianity =

Roman Christianity may refer to:

- Roman Christianity, early Christianity in Rome during the 1st to 4th centuries
- Christianity as the Roman state religion
- Roman Christianity, the doctrine of the contemporary Roman Catholic Church

== See also ==
- Constantine the Great and Christianity
- Historiography of the Christianization of the Roman Empire
- Persecution of Christians in the Roman Empire
- Persecution of pagans in the late Roman Empire
- Religion in ancient Rome
