= Synod of Tyre =

Synod of Tyre may refer to:

- The First Synod of Tyre, in 335, which judged the cause of St. Athanasius
- The Second Synod of Tyre, in 449, which dealt with the cause of Ibas, Bishop of Edessa.
- The Third Synod of Tyre, in 514 or 515, which rejected the Council of Chalcedon.
