= Ancient Diocese of Memphis =

In late antiquity, the ancient Egyptian capital of Memphis (Manf) was the seat of a Christian bishop. According to Athanasius of Alexandria, the city had a Melitian bishop named John around 325. In that year, its Orthodox bishop, Antiochus, attended the Council of Nicaea. John was still in power around 335.

Around 340, according to a Coptic Life of Athanasius, the Orthodox bishop of Memphis was Nestorius. A later bishop named Philip is credited with composing a biography of Saint Maharati. Some sources list a bishop Ptolemy around 700, but this may be due to confusion with an eponymous bishop of Onouphis (Manuf).

The first known bishop after the Arab conquest of Egypt is Mennas, who took part in a prayer service organized by the Patriarch Kha'il I (r. 744–767) to seek the rising of the Nile. In 798, Bishop Apa George was in the company of Patriarch John IV on a visit to Alexandria. Documents from the monastery of Dayr Apa Jeremiah list a Jacob as bishop of Memphis under Patriarch Joseph I (r. 830–849) and a bishop Antony of an undetermined period. The last record of a bishop of Memphis is from 1240, when a certain Mark is recorded as bishop of Awsim and Memphis. According to the early 13th-century report of Abu al-Makarim, there were then only two churches in what was left of Memphis.
