= Streptomyces finlayi =

Scientific classification
- Domain: Bacteria
- Kingdom: Bacillati
- Phylum: Actinomycetota
- Class: Actinomycetes
- Order: Streptomycetales
- Family: Streptomycetaceae
- Genus: Streptomyces
- Species: S. finlayi

Binomial name
- Streptomyces finlayi (Szabó et al. 1963) Pridham 1970 (Approved Lists 1980)

Type strain
- A111, AS 4.1436, ATCC 23340, ATCC 23906, BCRC 13796, CBS 802.68, CCRC 13796, CGMCC 4.1436, DSM 40218, FBUA 1869, HAMBI 1071, IFO 13201, ISP 5218, JCM 4216, JCM 4637, KC S-0637, KCC S-0216, KCC S-0637, KCCS- 0216, KCCS-0637, Lanoot R-8741, LMG 19373, NBRC 13201, NCIB 9834, NCIMB 9834, NRRL B-12114, NRRL-ISP 5218, R-1-30, R-8741, RIA 1162, Szabo R-I-30, SzaboR-1-30, VKM Ac-967

Synonyms
- "Actinomyces finlayi" Szabó et al. 1963

Species of bacterium

Streptomyces finlayi is a bacterium species from the genus of Streptomyces which has been isolated from soil from the plant Trifolium alexandrinum in Russia.

== See also ==
- List of Streptomyces species
