= Melitius of Lycopolis =

4th century bishop of Lycopolis, Egypt

Melitius or Meletius (died 327) was bishop of Lycopolis in Egypt. He is known mainly as the founder and namesake of the Melitians (c. 305), one of several schismatic sects in early church history which were concerned about the ease with which lapsed Christians re-entered the Church.

The details of his life are not clear, as there are conflicting accounts of it. According to one version, he was imprisoned for his Christianity during the persecution under Diocletian, along with Peter of Alexandria. Another source has Peter fleeing the scene, and a third one has Melitius himself avoiding prison. Apparently, as early as during the persecution itself, Melitius began to refuse to accept in communion those Christians who had renounced their faith during the persecution and later repented of that choice. Melitius' rigorous stance on that point stood in contrast to the earlier willingness of bishops to accept back into communion those who seemed to have truly repented (a pattern that had been addressed during previous similar controversies, including those who had lapsed during the Decian persecution about 50 years earlier).

As Bishop of Alexandria, Peter would have been recognised as the leader of the Egyptian church and thus Melitius's superior in the church hierarchy. The historian Philip Schaff tells that prior to Peter's death in 311, he spoke out against Melitius's actions and "deposed him as a disturber of the peace of the church".

The supporters that Melitius drew around him included 28 other bishops, at least some of whom he personally ordained, and the objections against him included that he ordained people in regions in which he lacked authority. His group went by the name Church of the Martyrs and inherently objected to the reacceptance by other bishops of people who chose to avoid the risk of martyrdom. Melitius' influence extended into Palestine.

It is believed by some that Melitius ordained Arius, known for the Arian controversy, as a priest. Scholarly opinions are divided on whether that is the case.

The Council of Nicaea in 325 attempted to create peace with the Melitians. Melitius was allowed to remain bishop of Lycopolis but was no longer to ordain bishops outside his region. The bishops whom he had already ordained were accepted under certain restrictions and had to be reordained. Melitius's death followed in 327, and he was succeeded as leader by his handpicked successor, John Arkhaph. The effort to bring unity proved unsuccessful. His followers sided with the Arians in their controversy and existed as a separate sect until the 5th century.
