= Papacy in late antiquity =

History of papacy between 313–476

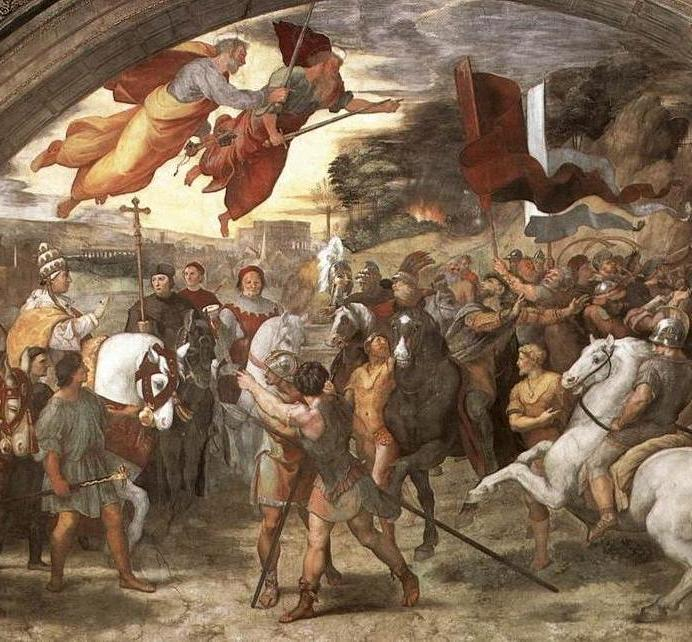
The meeting of Attila (left with barbarian troops) with Pope Leo I (right), the most notable pope of late antiquity. By Raphael, 1514

The Papacy in late antiquity was a period in papal history between 313, when the Peace in the Church began, and the pontificate of Simplicius in 476, when the Roman Empire of the West fell.

== Overview ==
The beginning of this period is usually taken to be when in Late Antiquity, in 313, Emperor Constantine granted freedom to all religions. He then began to interfere in various ecclesiastical matters, giving rise to Caesaropapism, and a relationship of "difficult entanglement between Church and State", a unique characteristic of this period.

One of the first demonstrations of a state power administered by the popes, also emerged at this time, although it was purely diplomatic: "Defender of the needy and the people", as observed in Pope Leo I's confrontation with Attila, emperor of the Huns, in which Leo convinces Attila not to invade and sack Rome.

The most significant and important pontificate of Christian antiquity was that of Leo I, who fought for Catholic unity and orthodoxy.

The synodal organization that had been vital in the 3rd century also grew in importance at this time - through ecumenical councils called by emperors (for pragmatic and also caesaropapism reasons), to provide a definitive resolution to doctrinal disputes in the Catholic Church. The attempt by some councils to be independent of papal authority, to challenge it or even to control it, caused Pope Boniface I to declare early on that papal power is superior to synodal power and the latter cannot judge it.

At this time the conflicts between the Church of the West and East deepened. In 330, the capital of the Roman Empire was transferred to Constantinople, thus quickly in the Eastern Roman Empire the civil power controlled the Church and the bishop of Constantinople grew in importance, basing their power on being bishop of the capital and being a trusted man of the Emperor. In the West, on the other hand, the bishop of Rome was able to consolidate the influence and power he already had since early Christianity. In 380, the Edict of Thessalonica issued by Emperor Theodosius I established the Catholic religion as taught by Pope Damasus I as the exclusive state religion of the Empire.

The end of the papacy in Late Antiquity is usually placed in 472, in the beginning of the Middle Ages, when Germanic tribes invaded and caused the collapse of the Western Roman Empire, turning the Roman provinces into a series of small kingdoms, administered by the Visigoths, Vandals, and Franks. Italy, in turn, was dominated by the Ostrogoths, beginning the period of interaction between the popes and the Ostrogoth kings.

== History ==
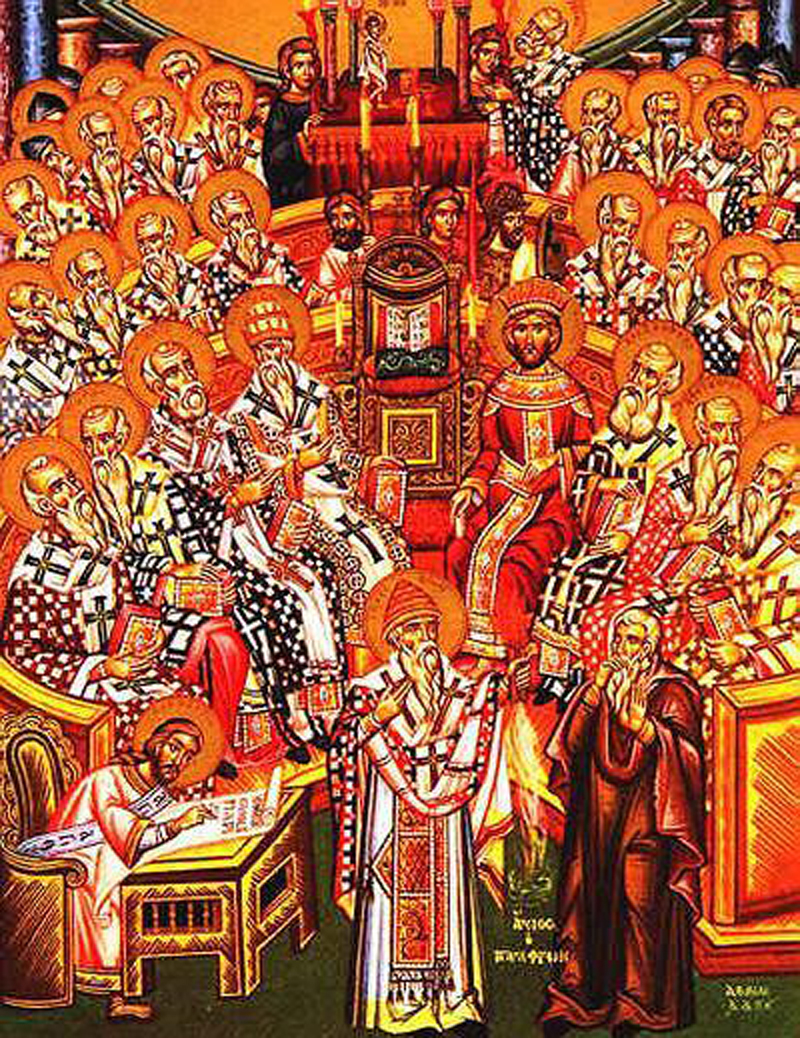
Icon depicting the First Council of Nicaea

In 313, Emperor Constantine I issued the Edict of Milan in which he granted freedom to all religious creeds, beginning the Peace in the Church. Constantine convened in 325 the First Council of Nicaea, a minimal manifestation of the belief shared by the Christian bishops, which condemned Arianism, and dogmatized Trinitarianism. It also stated in its sixth canon that it was following "ancient custom" in officiating the special powers of Rome, as well as those of Alexandria and Antioch - the popes being great defenders of the Nicaea faith.

Although the bishop of Rome at the time, Sylvester I, held his office at a crucial time in the history of the Catholic Church, little is known about him. He did not attend the council for unknown reasons, yet his legates played an important role in it (Constantine had ordered the assassination of his family for political reasons). As a way of doing penance, he ordered the construction of three basilicas in Rome, the Basilica of St. John Lateran, St. Peter's, St. Paul Extramuros, and several cemeteries on the tombs of martyrs and donated them to the papacy.

Constantine I and the next emperors considered it their role to maintain proper worship of God, and preserve orthodoxy in their domains, although they did not decide on doctrine - that was the responsibility of the bishops. Still, this attitude erupted a series of theological conflicts between the emperors and the popes. Due to the pressure and influence of the emperors, the popes stopped participating in the next seven ecumenical councils, only approving or disapproving their decrees later.

In 343, during the pontificate of Pope Julius I, the Council of Serdica was convened, making official the custom of bishops appealing to the pope if disputes arose. Although it was originally convened with the claim of being an ecumenical council, it lost its universality due to the absence of many bishops. Later Constantius II, son of Constantine, converted to Arianism and tried to impose his doctrinal views on Pope Liberius, Liberius refused and was exiled to Berea and replaced by Antipope Felix II. After the emperor's death, the Roman people expelled Felix, Liberius returned to Rome and annulled his decrees and reiterated his Trinitarian position, imposing it on the other western bishops.

Pope Damasus I then deposed several bishops related to Arianism, affirmed the primacy of the pope as Peter's successor, reformed temples, tombs, and monuments in Rome, and converted the city's nobility. Damasus ordered Jerome to translate the Bible from Greek and Hebrew into Latin, giving rise to the Vulgate. Damasus also convened the regional council of Rome, whose canons were instrumental in fixing the biblical books in the West. Since in 330, the capital of the empire was moved to Constantinople, the eponymous council, held in 381 for the first time, decreed a position of significant importance for the bishop of this city (originally it was not an ecumenical council, but a regional one, which is why the western bishops and the pope were ignored).

In 385, Pope Siricius, in a decree to the Bishop of Tarragona, advocated celibacy and chastity.

Between 427 and 428, Nestorius became Patriarch of Constantinople and was opposed to the use of the term Theotok (in Greek, Mother of God) to refer to the Virgin Mary; in contrast, St. Cyril, Patriarch of Alexandria, advocated the use of the term, and both patriarchs sent their sermons to Pope Celestine I, asking him to decree his opinion, Celestine ruled in favor of Cyril and delegated him the authority to hunt down Nestorius' episcopate. However, Emperor Theodosius II resisted the papal verdict and called an ecumenical council. In 431, Cyril opened the council as president and papal representative, effectively dogmatizing his position.

Pope Leo I was the most notable pontiff of this period, and had an essential participation in the Christological conflicts of the Church against the monophysitism of Eutyches. To settle this question definitively, in 451, Emperor Marcian convened the Council of Chalcedon, which adopted Leo I's letter on the subject, Tomus I, as dogma. The same synod also regards the Council of Constantinople as ecumenical, (Note: The Council of Constantinople is considered ecumenical by Chalcedon because it uses its creed as a continuation of the First Council of Nicaea (originating the Nicene-Constantinopolitan Creed). However, it was not recognized by the West as ecumenical until the sixth century by Pope Hormisda and even then the validity of the third canon, which creates the patriarchate of Constantinople, was not accepted.) and strengthens in two canons the powers of the Bishop of Constantinople. (Note: Canon 9 stated that bishops and priests should have recourse to the Bishop of Constantinople in case of conflicts, and Canon 28 definitively recognizes the patriarchate of Constantinople, defining its jurisdiction over Pontus, Asia Minor, and Thrace.) The council justified this decision on the ground that "the Fathers justly granted privileges to the throne of ancient Rome, because it was the royal city," and that what the First Council of Constantinople

"moved by the same consideration, gave equal privileges to the holiest throne of New Rome, justly judging that the city is honored with the sovereignty and the Senate, and enjoys privileges of equality with ancient imperial Rome, in ecclesiastical matters, well ought in ecclesiastical matters to magnify itself like it and to align itself after it [...].".

Pope Leo I, although having recognized the council as ecumenical and confirming its decrees, rejected all canons granting privileges to Constantinople, arguing that the Bishop of Rome based his authority on the fact that he was the successor of St. Peter and not the bishop of the imperial capital.

== Popes of this period ==
Although the characteristics of the papacy in late antiquity developed over time, the period 313–476, is a rough approximation used by scholars as a likely date to characterize this era. There were 15 popes at this time:

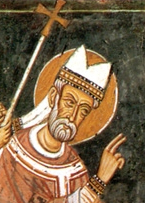
Pope Sylvester I (314-335)

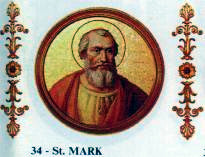
Pope Mark (335-336)

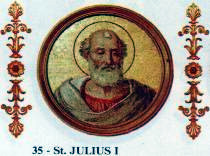
Pope Julius I (337-352)

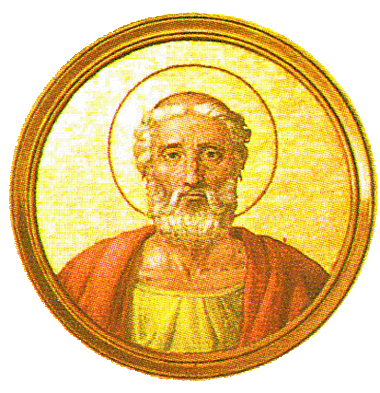
Pope Liberius (352-366)

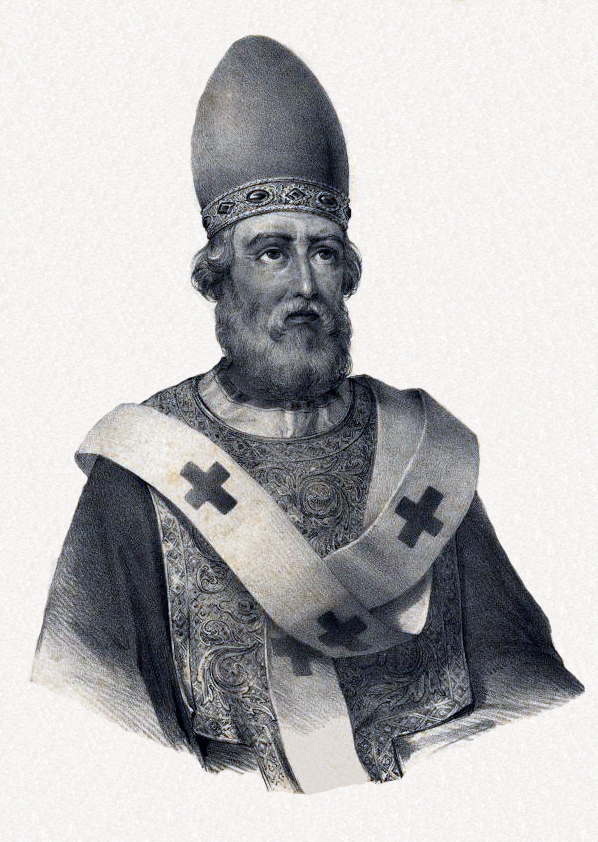
Pope Damasus I (366-383)

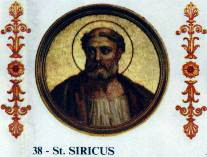
Pope Siricius (384-399)

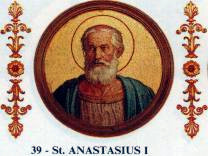
Pope Anastasius I (399-401)

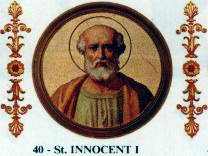
Pope Innocent I (401-417)

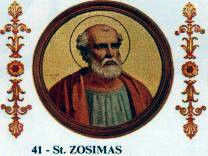
Pope Zosimus (417-418)

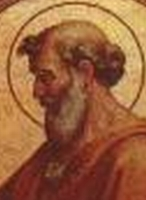
Pope Boniface I (418-422)

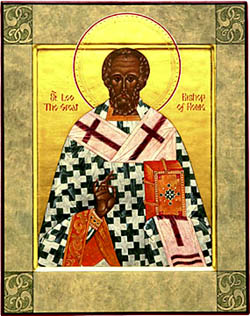
Pope Leo I (440-461)

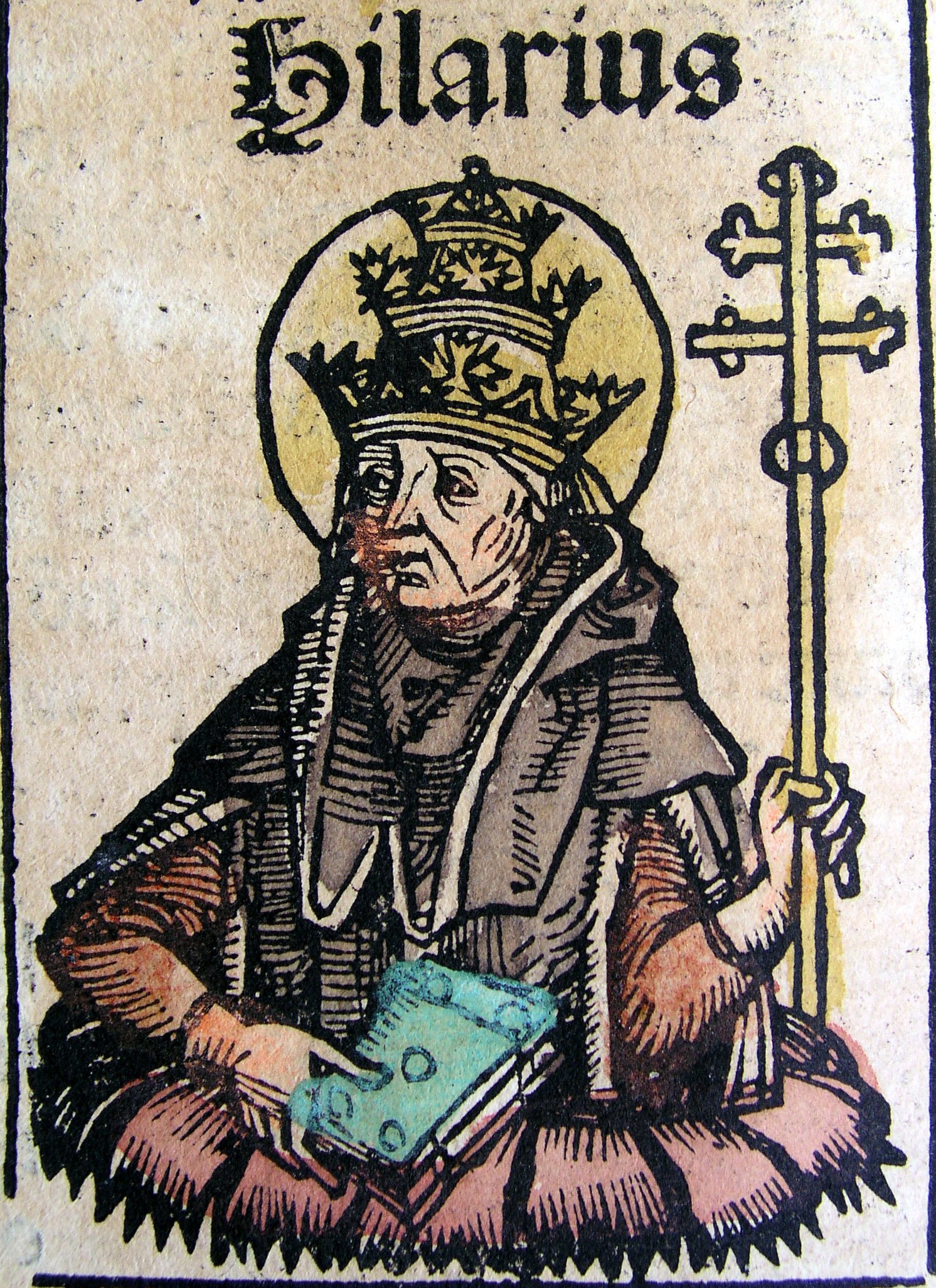
Pope Hilarius (461-468)

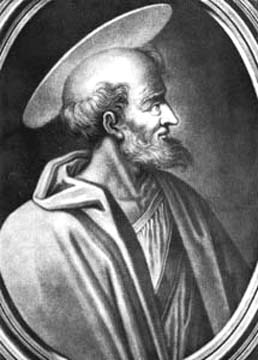
Pope Simplicius (468-483)
