= Sacralism =

Sacralism is the confluence of church and state wherein one is called upon to change the other. It also denotes a perspective that views church and state as tied together instead of separate entities so that people within a geographical and political region are considered members of the dominant ecclesiastical institution.

== Concept ==
A Latin saying that has often been used to describe the principle of sacralism is cuius regio, eius religio, or "who has region, decides religion." The idea was that the ruler of each individual area would decide the religion of those under his control based upon his own faith. Another conceptualization refers to sacralism as a view that each fundamental relations that one occupies should be seen under the aspect of the sacred.

A critical description cite sacralism as the use of the concept of "the will of God" to legitimate oppression and violence. There are sources that consider it as a form of fundamentalism.

== Examples ==
Christian sacralism is, according to Verduin, the hybrid product that resulted from the colossal change known as the Constantinian shift that began early in the fourth century AD, when Christianity was granted official tolerance in the Roman Empire by the Emperor Constantine, and was completed by the Emperor Theodosius's declaration in 392 outlawing paganism and making Christianity the official religion of the Empire. The so-called Constantinian formula was described as a system that required the rule-right expressed in the State coalesce with the rule-right that comes to expression in the Church. This resulted in the so-called age of Christian sacralism when Roman citizens who did not necessarily subscribe to the faith are coerced into it for fear of social discrimination and outright persecution. It is suggested that the Christian sacralism still had pagan roots and that theologians merely embraced it using precepts from the Old Testament and New Testament. For instance, theologians established that Christ authorized the use of two swords: the sword of the clergy, which is the sword of the Spirit; and the sword of the soldiers of the state or the sword of steel. Christian sacralism lasted until the Reformation when Christians gradually moved away from sacralism.

Sacralism is common in countries predominantly inhabited by followers of Islam. These have a tendency to comingle religion with politics and law, with the result viewed by Muslims as a compact and positive unity of all aspects of life.

Sacralism has also been applied in the area of international relations. There are modernists, for example, who approach world affairs from a range of analytical languages that have their origin within European Christendom. Thinkers who subscribe to the sacralist view also argue that the whole mind is capable of knowing and have put modernism in the context of their faith. The idea is that aspects of modernism have arisen in a particular sacral environment.

== See also ==
- Theocracy
- Separation of church and state
- The Anabaptists — whose history illustrates a continued rejection of sacralism.
