= John Arkhaph =

4th-century bishop of Memphis in Egypt

John Arkhaph (also spelled Arkaph or Archaph) was the bishop of Memphis in Egypt in the 320s and 330s. He was a disciple of Bishop Melitios of Lykopolis, whom he succeeded in 327 as leader of the Church of the Martyrs.

The origin and meaning of "Arkhaph" are uncertain. Athanasius treats it as a Coptic name and calls him "Archaph who is also called John". Socrates Scholasticus transforms it into the Biblical name Achab. Possibly it is formed from arch (supreme) and apa (father) as an alternate to the title archiereus (high priest), which was used of the bishop of Alexandria in some Coptic documents. Besides Athanasius and Socrates, the historian Sozomen is an important source for John's career.

John is first mentioned in the Breviarium Melitii, a list of bishops and other clergy of the Church of the Martyrs submitted by Melitios to the Council of Nicaea in 325. Nothing of his earlier life is known and no writings by him survive. He is "a shadowy and controversial figure".

Melitios chose John as his successor shortly before his death in 327. The schism in the Egyptian church that had been healed at Nicaea was resumed in 328 at the election of Athanasius as bishop of Alexandria. John was a staunch opponent of Athanasius, although the two reconciled long enough for the Emperor Constantine I to send John a letter of congratulations for ending the schism.

There is a note added beside John's name in Athanasius' copy of the Breviarium: "was ordered by the emperor to be with the bishop". The exact meaning of the note and the identity of the bishop are a matter of academic debate. It may mean that John was ordered to submit to Athanasius in 328, or it may mean that John had been the representative of his church to the Alexandrian church at the time of the Council of Nicaea. Ultimately, the rivalry between John and Athanasius resulted in the latter's condemnation at the Council of Tyre in 335. Athanasius then went into exile, while John and his clergy were restored to their positions. Constantine, however, took exception to the council and exiled John and the rest of his clergy. In 337, the emperor died and Athanasius returned. Nothing more is known of John after the Tyrian settlement fell apart.
