= Melitians =

Early Christian denomination

The Melitians, (Note: This spelling comes from the contemporary Life of Constantine by Eusebius of Caesarea, which uses Μελιτιανοί (Melitianoi) in Greek. It is also attested in Syriac. Although the spelling Meletian is common, it correctly describes only the schism of Meletius of Antioch a generation later.) sometimes called the Church of the Martyrs, (Note: The name "Church of the Martyrs" was chosen by Melitius himself, but his was not the only rigorist sect to use that name in the early church.) were an early Christian sect in Egypt. They were founded about 306 by Bishop Melitius of Lycopolis and survived as a small group into the eighth century. The point on which they broke with the Great Church (Note: Epiphanius of Salamis, a contemporary critic of the Melitians, contrasts the Melitian church with the "Catholic church".) was the same as that of the contemporary Donatists in the province of Africa: the ease with which lapsed Christians were received back into communion. The resultant division in the church of Egypt is known as the Melitian schism. (Note: In sources that use the same spelling of Melitian/Meletian for both the schism in Egypt and the one in Antioch, the Egyptian schism may be called the First Meletian Schism.)

== Start of the schism, 306–311 ==
Melitius advocated the open practice of Christianity in the face of official persecution, including the celebration of the liturgy, and urged Christians not to go into hiding. During the Diocletianic Persecution, he was imprisoned, alongside Patriarch Peter I of Alexandria in 305/306. Both of them were released during a lull in the persecutions, and Peter laid down terms for the readmission of "lapsed" Christians: those who had abjured the faith under persecution. Melitius found his terms too lax and, during the dispute that followed, ordained some of his supporters. Peter excommunicated him.

When the persecutions flared up again, Peter was killed (311), and Melitius was condemned to the mines. He was released by the Edict of Serdica (311), but the persecutions came to a permanent end only with the Edict of Milan in 313. When Melitius returned to Egypt, he founded what he called the Church of the Martyrs with clergy of his own ordination. The name "Melitians" was at first used only by the sect's opponents, who sought thereby to contrast them (as heretics) with true Christians. It was also used by the imperial chancery. The name eventually lost its negative connotations and was adopted by the sect.

== Attempts to resolve the schism: Nicaea (325) and Tyre (335) ==
Peter's successor as patriarch, Achillas, failed in his short pontificate to resolve the growing crisis. His successor, Alexander I, who came to power in 313, sought to heal the schism in the Egyptian church to better combat Arianism since he regarded the Melitians' Christology as sound. In 325 the Council of Nicaea under Emperor Constantine I attempted to incorporate the Melitians into the now legal church. The council agreed to grant Melitian priests "full clerical privileges" if they were willing to forswear schism and "acknowledge the authority" of the patriarch of Alexandria. It was permitted for Melitian clergy to be elected to succeed Catholic bishops, and Melitius himself was to remain a bishop with no fixed see. He was not restored to Lycopolis. Melitius submitted to the council a list of his bishops and clergy, known as the Breviarium Melitii. The list shows a Melitian presence along the whole length of Egypt, and there is little evidence for the theory that the centre of Melitian strength was in Upper Egypt. There were 28 Melitian bishops in 325, and several had Coptic names.

The period of concord lasted three years. Melitius died in 327 (Note: Historian Janet Timbie says that the date is unknown, only that he died between 325 and 332.) and had appointed John Archaph as his successor. In 328, Athanasius was elected in absentia to succeed Alexander I as patriarch. Encouraged by Eusebius of Nicomedia, the Melitians went into schism and elected a rival patriarch named Theonas with the support of the Arians. Richard Hanson argues that the Arians, the followers of Eusebius, made a pact with the Melitians only after the Melitians had unsuccessfully appealed to the emperor for protection from Athanasius. A certain Pistos, a friend of Arius, was even ordained a bishop in the Melitian church. It is unclear if or to what extent the Melitians' Christology had been influenced by or approximated to Arianism in that period. In several letters, the Melitians accused Athanasius of beating their bishops, even of murdering one, and of desecrating Melitian liturgical vessels.

In 335, as a result of those accusations, Athanasius was condemned at the First Synod of Tyre, excommunicated, deposed and forced into exile. Athanasius responded in his famous anti-Arian tracts Apologia contra Arianos and Historia Arianorum by accusing the Melitians of lying and conspiring with Arians to unseat him. Constantine I reacted to the Council of Tyre by exiling the Melitian clergy, including John Arkaph.

== Survival as a monastic movement ==
The names of the leaders of the sect following John Arkhaph, who is not mentioned after 335, are not known. Athanasius continued to refer to them as an ongoing threat in his writings of the 350s and 360s. He claims in his biography of Anthony the Great that the Melitians claimed the hermit saint as one of their own. As a schismatic sect, the Melitians declined in importance by 400, but they did not disappear. They are mentioned in the writings of Cyril of Alexandria (d. 444) and Shenoute (d. c. 465) and persisted into the eighth century (after the Arab conquest of Egypt) as a small monastic sect.

Numerous papyri have been discovered bearing evidence of a Melitian monasticism flourishing in the Egyptian desert in the 4th century. It is clear that Melitian monks lived in communities, but it is not certain if they were tightly-structured arrangements like the coenobia of the Pachomians or loose quasi-eremitic groupings like the monasteries of Nitria and Scetis. Timothy of Constantinople, in his On the Reception of Heretics written towards 600, says of the Melitians that "they engaged in no [theological] error, but must pronounce their schism anathema" to rejoin the church. According to the History of the Patriarchs of Alexandria by John the Deacon, some Melitians were reconciled to the Coptic Patriarchate of Alexandria by the efforts of Bishop Moses of Letopolis late in the reign of Patriarch Michael I (died 767).

According to Theodoret (d. c. 460), the Melitians developed unique forms of worship that included hand clapping and music. It has been argued that the movement was dominated by Copts (native Egyptian-speakers). Coptic papyri, the writings of the Pachomians and mentions in the writings of Shenoute lend some weight to this view.

== Bibliography ==
- Barkman, Heather (2014). "The Church of the Martyrs in Egypt and North Africa: A Comparison of the Melitian and Donatist Schisms". Journal of the Canadian Society for Coptic Studies. 6 (1): 41–58.
- Barnard, L. W. (1973). "Athanasius and the Meletian Schism in Egypt". Journal of Egyptian Archaeology. 59: 281–289. doi:10.1177/030751337305900121. S2CID 192269982.
- Barnard, L. W. (1975). "Some Notes on the Meletian Schism in Egypt". Studia Patristica. 12 (1): 399–405.
- Barnes, T. D. (1981). Constantine and Eusebius. Harvard University Press.
- Bell, H. I.; Crum, W. E., eds. (1972) [1924]. Jews and Christians in Egypt: The Jewish Troubles in Alexandria and the Athanasian Controversy. Greenwood.
- Carroll, Scott T. (1989). The Melitian Schism: Coptic Christianity and the Egyptian Church (Ph.D. thesis). Miami University.
- Cross, F. L.; Livingstone, E. A., eds. (2009) [2005]. "Melitian Schisms". The Oxford Dictionary of the Christian Church (3rd rev. ed.). Oxford University Press. ISBN 9780192802903.
- Davis, Stephen J. (2004). The Early Coptic Papacy: The Egyptian Church and Its Leadership in Late Antiquity. American University in Cairo Press.
- Gregory, Timothy E. (1991). "Meletian Schism in Egypt". In Kazhdan, Alexander (ed.). The Oxford Dictionary of Byzantium. Oxford and New York: Oxford University Press. ISBN 0-19-504652-8.
- Gwynn, David M. (2007). The Eusebians: The Polemic of Athanasius of Alexandria and the Construction of the 'Arian Controversy'. Oxford University Press.
- Gwynn, David M. (2012). "Meletian Schism". In Roger S. Bagnall; Kai Brodersen; Craige B. Champion; Andrew Erskine; Sabine R. Huebner (eds.). The Encyclopedia of Ancient History. Wiley. pp. 4420–4421. doi:10.1002/9781444338386.wbeah12149. ISBN 9781444338386.
- Gwynn, David M. (2018). "Meletius and Meletians". In Oliver Nicholson (ed.). The Oxford Dictionary of Late Antiquity. Vol. 2. Oxford University Press. pp. 1000–1001.
- Hanson, R. P. C. (1988). The Search for the Christian Doctrine of God: The Arian Controversy, 318–381. T&T Clark.
- Hauben, Hans (1998). "The Melitian 'Church of the Martyrs': Christian Dissenters in Ancient Egypt". In T. Hillard; R. Kearsley; C. Nixon; A. Nobbs (eds.). Ancient History in a Modern University, Vol. 2: Early Christianity, Late Antiquity and Beyond. Eerdmans. pp. 329–349.
- Hauben, Hans (2012). Peter Van Nuffelen (ed.). Studies on the Melitian Schism in Egypt (AD 306–335). Variorum Collected Studies. Ashgate.
- McGuckin, John Anthony (2004). The Westminster Handbook to Patristic Theology. Westminster John Knox Press.
- Migne, Jacques Paul, ed. (1865). "Timotheus Constantinopolitanus Presbyter". Patrologia Graeca. Vol. 86. Paris. I, cols. 12–69.
- Mikhail, Maged S. A. (2014). From Byzantine to Islamic Egypt: Religion, Identity and Politics after the Arab Conquest. I. B. Tauris.
- Schwartz, Édouard (1905). "Zur Geschichte des Athanasius, V". Nachrichten von der königlichen Gesellschaft der Wissenschaften zu Göttingen (Philologisch-historische Klasse). Weidmannsche Buchhandlung. pp. 164–256.
- Telfer, William (1955). "Meletius of Lycopolis and Episcopal Succession in Egypt". Harvard Theological Review. 48 (4): 227–237. doi:10.1017/S0017816000025220. S2CID 162693650.
- Timbie, Janet (1991). "Melitian Schism". In Aziz Suryal Atiya (ed.). The Coptic Encyclopedia. Vol. 5. New York: Macmillan Publishers. pp. 1584a–1585a.
- Van Nuffelen, Peter (2012). "The Melitian Schism: Development, Sources, and Interpretation". In Peter van Nuffelen (ed.). Studies on the Melitian Schism in Egypt (AD 306–335). Variorum Collected Studies. Ashgate. pp. xi–xxxvi.
