= Edict of Milan =

Legalization of Christianity in the Roman Empire (313)

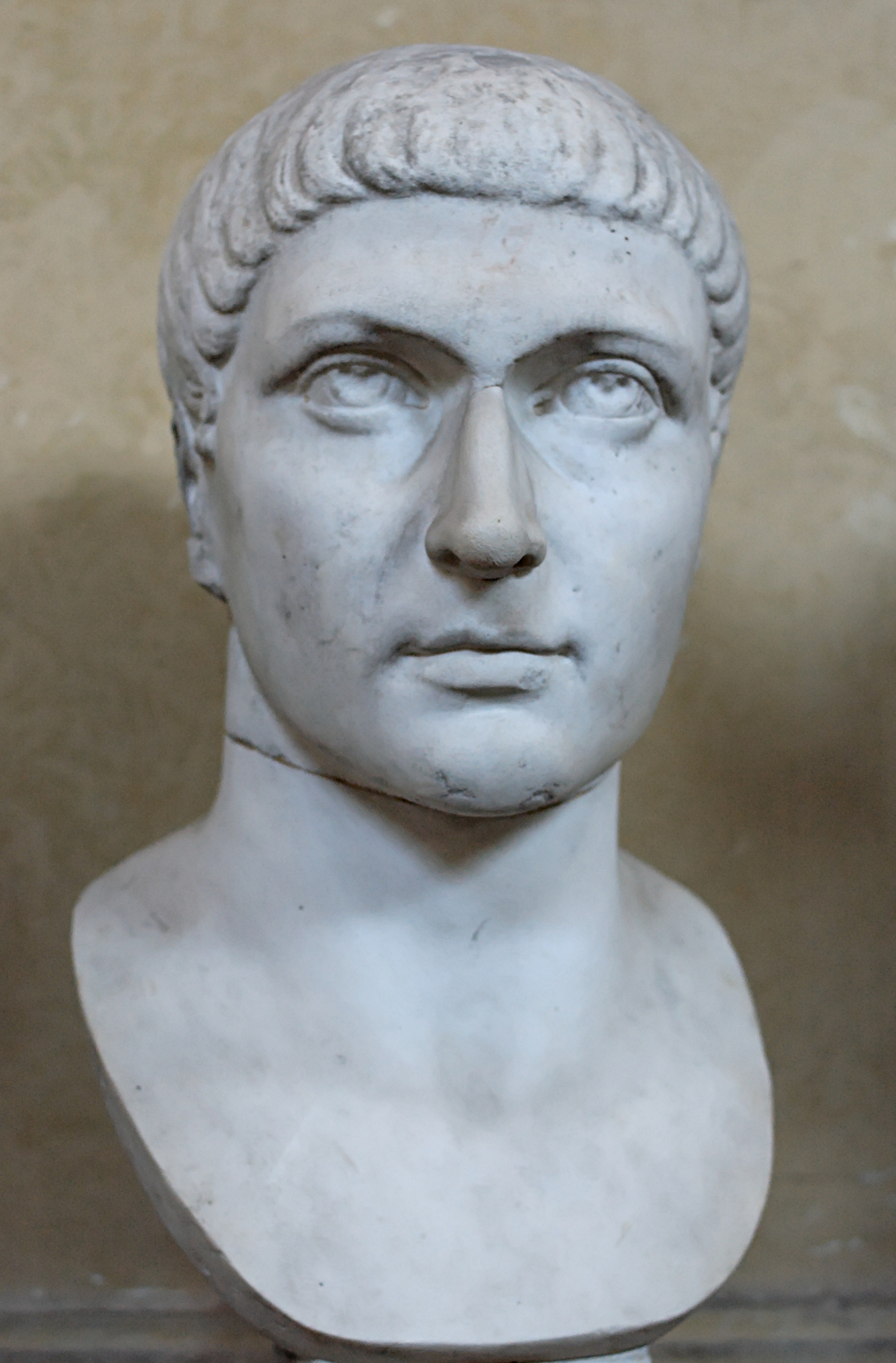
Bust of Emperor Constantine I, Roman, 4th century

The Edict of Milan (Latin: Edictum Mediolanense; Greek: Διάταγμα τῶν Μεδιολάνων, Diatagma tōn Mediolanōn) was the 13 February 313 AD agreement to treat Christians benevolently within the Roman Empire and allow religious freedom more broadly. Western Roman Emperor Constantine I and Emperor Licinius, who controlled the Balkans, met in Mediolanum (modern-day Milan) and, among other things, agreed to change policies towards Christians following the edict of toleration issued by Emperor Galerius two years earlier in Serdica.

The document is found in Lactantius's De mortibus persecutorum and in Eusebius of Caesarea's History of the Church with marked divergences between the two. Whether or not there was a formal 'Edict of Milan' is no longer really debated among scholars, who generally reject the story as it has come down in church history. The version found in Lactantius is not in the form of an edict. It is a letter from Licinius to the governors of the provinces in the Eastern Empire that he had just conquered by defeating Maximinus later that same year and issued in Nicomedia.

The Edict of Milan gave Christianity legal status and a reprieve from persecution but did not make it the state church of the Roman Empire, which occurred in 380 AD with the Edict of Thessalonica, when Nicene Christianity received normative status.

== Background ==
The Romans considered themselves highly religious and attributed their success as a world power to their collective piety (pietas) in maintaining good relations with the gods. The Romans were known for the great number of deities that they honored. The presence of Greeks on the Italian peninsula introduced new religious practices, including the cult of Apollo. The Romans looked for common ground between their major gods and those of the Greeks, adapting Greek myths and iconography for Latin literature and Roman art. According to legend, most of Rome's religious institutions could be traced to its founders. This archaic religion formed the foundation of the mos maiorum—"the way of the ancestors", or simply "tradition"—which was viewed as central to Roman identity. Through interpretatio graeca and interpretatio romana, the religions of other peoples incorporated into the Roman Empire co-existed within the Roman theological hierarchy.

The Judeo-Christian insistence on their god being the only God and in believing all other gods were false gods could not be fitted into the system. Their scruples prevented them swearing loyalty oaths directed at the emperor's divinity. More particularly, the refusal of Christians to pay the Jewish tax was perceived as a threat not just to the state cult but to the state itself. That led to various forms of persecution. Emperor Decius (r. 249–251) issued edicts that imposed hard restrictions on Christians, a policy continued by his successor Valerian. With the accession of Gallienus (r. 253–268), the Church enjoyed a period of nearly 40 years with no official sanctions against Christians, which Eusebius described as the "little" peace of the Church. In 311, Galerius published an edict from Nicomedia that officially ended the persecutions.

== Edict of Toleration by Galerius ==
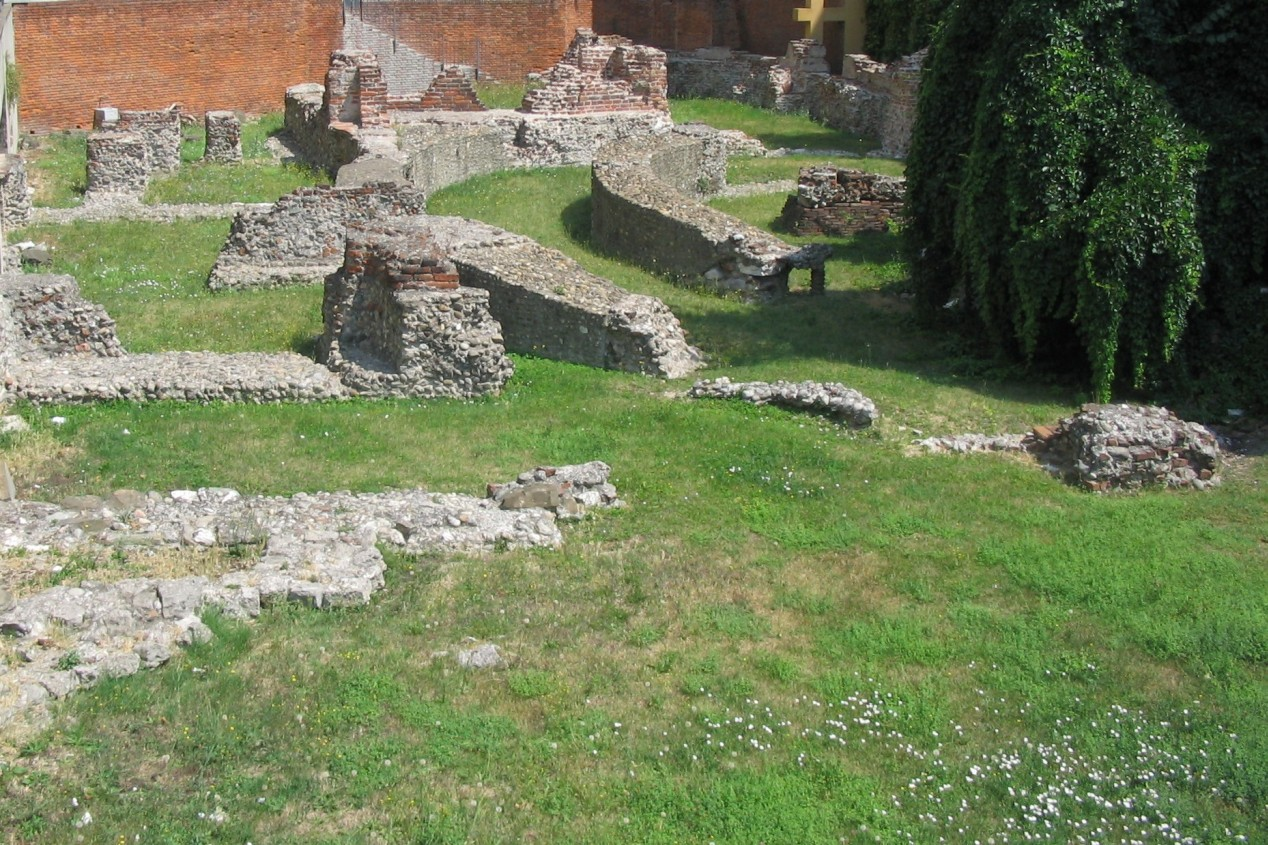
Remains of the Imperial palace of Mediolanum (Milan). The imperial palace (built in large part by Maximian, colleague of Diocletian) was a large complex with several buildings, gardens, and courtyards, used for the Emperor's private and public activities, and for his court, family, and imperial bureaucracy.

Since the fall of the Severan dynasty in 235 AD, rivals for the imperial throne had bid for support by either favouring or persecuting Christians. The Edict of Toleration by Galerius had been issued by the emperor Galerius from Serdica and was posted at Nicomedia on 30 April 311. By its provisions, Christians who had "followed such a caprice and had fallen into such a folly that they would not obey the institutes of antiquity" were granted an indulgence.

Wherefore, for this our indulgence, they ought to pray to their God for our safety, for that of the republic, and for their own, that the commonwealth may continue uninjured on every side, and that they may be able to live securely in their homes.

== Text ==
The actual letters have never been retrieved. However, they are quoted at length in Lactantius's On the Deaths of the Persecutors (De mortibus persecutorum), which gives the Latin text of both Galerius's edict of toleration as posted at Nicomedia on 30 April 311 and of Licinius's letter of toleration and restitution addressed to the governor of Bithynia and posted at Nicomedia on 13 June 313. The latter states:

When we, Constantine Augustus and Licinius Augustus, met so happily at Milan, and considered together all that concerned the interest and security of the State, we decided ... to grant to Christians and to everybody the free power to follow the religion of their choice, in order that all that is divine in the heavens may be favorable and propitious towards all who are placed under our authority.

Eusebius of Caesarea translated both documents into Greek in his History of the Church (Historia Ecclesiastica). His version of the letter of Licinius must derive from a copy posted in the province of Syria Palaestina (probably at its capital, Caesarea) in the late summer or early autumn of 313, but the origin of his copy of Galerius's edict of 311 is unknown since that does not seem to have been promulgated in Caesarea. In his description of the events in Milan in his Life of Constantine, Eusebius eliminated the role of Licinius, whom he portrayed as the evil foil to his hero Constantine.

The Edict of Milan was in effect directed against Maximinus Daza, the Caesar in the East who styled himself as Augustus. Having received Emperor Galerius's instruction to repeal the persecution in 311, Maximinus had instructed his subordinates to desist, but he had not released Christians from prisons or virtual death sentences in the mines, as Constantine and Licinius had both done in the West.

After Galerius's death, Maximinus was no longer constrained and enthusiastically took up renewed persecutions in the eastern territories under his control, encouraging petitions against Christians. One of those petitions, addressed not only to Maximinus but also to Constantine and Licinius, is preserved in a stone inscription at Arycanda in Lycia, and is a "request that the Christians, who have long been disloyal and still persist in the same mischievous intent, should at last be put down and not be suffered by any absurd novelty to offend against the honour due to the gods."

The edict is popularly thought to concern only Christianity and even to make it the official religion of the Empire (which did not occur until the Edict of Thessalonica in 380). Indeed, the edict expressly grants religious liberty to Christians, who had been the object of special persecution, but also goes even further and grants liberty to all other religions:

When you see that this has been granted to [Christians] by us, your Worship will know that we have also conceded to other religions the right of open and free observance of their worship for the sake of the peace of our times, that each one may have the free opportunity to worship as he pleases; this regulation is made that we may not seem to detract from any dignity of any religion.

— "Edict of Milan", Lactantius, On the Deaths of the Persecutors (De Mortibus Persecutorum), ch. 48. opera, ed. 0. F. Fritzsche, II, p 288 sq. (Bibl Patr. Ecc. Lat. XI).

Since Licinius composed the edict with the intent of publishing it in the east upon his hoped-for victory over Maximinus, it expresses the religious policy accepted by Licinius, a pagan, rather than that of Constantine, who was already a Christian. Constantine's own policy went beyond merely tolerating Christianity. He tolerated paganism and other religions but actively promoted Christianity.

== Religious statement ==
Although the Edict of Milan is commonly presented as Constantine's first great act as a Christian emperor, it is disputed whether the Edict of Milan was an act of genuine faith. The document could be seen as Constantine's first step in creating an alliance with the Christian God, whom he considered the strongest deity. At that time, he was concerned about social stability and the protection of the empire from the wrath of the Christian God: in this view, the edict could be a pragmatic political decision rather than a religious shift. However, the majority of historians believe that Constantine's adoption of Christianity was genuine, and that the Edict of Milan was merely the first official act of Constantine as a dedicated Christian. This view is supported by Constantine's ongoing favors on behalf of Christianity during the rest of his reign.

== Peace of the Church ==
Galerius's earlier edict did nothing to restore the confiscated property of Christians. That was left to the Edict of Milan. Instructions were given for Christians' meeting places and other properties to be returned and compensation to be paid by the state to the current owners:

the same shall be restored to the Christians without payment or any claim of recompense and without any kind of fraud or deception.

It directed the provincial magistrates to execute the order at once with all energy so that public order may be restored and the continuance of divine favour may "preserve and prosper our successes together with the good of the state." Constantine ordered for the restitution to be at the expense of the state. For Christians, the immunities and guaranties contained in the act had most important results. For the first time, it became possible to observe publicly the liturgy in its fullness and to attempt seriously and earnestly to mould the life of the empire according to Christian ideals and standards. The joy of the Christians at this change in their public status is expressed by Eusebius in his "Church History" (X, ii).

This period of Church history is also known as the "Peace of the Church". Eusebius says that it stated that "it has pleased us to remove all conditions whatsoever." The edict further demanded that individual Romans right any wrongs towards Christians: "...the same shall be restored to the Christians without payment or any claim of recompense and without any kind of fraud or deception." The exhortation to right historic wrongs may also reflect the leaders' desires to avoid unfavourable consequences such as social unrest and further conquests. Koszarycz says that Constantine was superstitious and believed in the existence of the non-Christian gods enough that they did not want to offset the balance of good and evil. It was believed that the sooner that balance was restored by the Romans establishing a state of justice with the Christians, the sooner the state would become stable.

The term "Peace of the Church" has sometimes been applied in Great Britain and Ireland to the ending of persecution that followed Catholic emancipation between 1778 and 1926. In Germany, it can refer to life after the Kulturkampf, which lasted from 1871 to 1878.

== See also ==
- Constantine the Great and Christianity
- Constantinian shift
- Peace of God
- Papacy in late antiquity
