= Mohrael =

Saint Herai (Coptic: ⲁⲙⲁ ϩⲏⲣⲁⲓ, Ge'ez: ምሕራኤል) was a Coptic saint and martyr. She was martyred in the 4th century AD at the age of 12 years.

St. Mohrael came from a pious family. Abbouna Yoannis (a priest) was her father and Illaria was her mother. The Bishop of Menf in Egypt, prophesied the birth and martyrdom of Mohrael and her younger brother Abba Hor.

== Life ==
Illaria's daughter Mohrael was born, after a period of barrenness, in the year 291 AD in Tammow, a suburb of what is now Cairo during the reign of Diocletian.

She lived as an ascetic in her father's house and God granted her many gifts. At the age of 12, she received the gift of healing.

Abbouna Yoannis had a visitation by St. Mary and St. Elizabeth in which they called his daughter to martyrdom. Upon Abbouna Yoannis request St. Mary promised to return his daughter's body and St. Mary added that in Tamou a Church will be built for Mohrael.

== Martyrdom ==
St. Mohrael went to the sea shore to fill water as was her custom (St. Mohrael icon shows this scene). She was taken on a boat of Christians going to be martyred.

She was persecuted by many cruel devices of metal and also with fire. At last she was put in a boat with venomous reptiles and arachnids. St. Mohrael endured for three days and then she died. The place where her martyrdom took place was in upper Egypt.

== Miracles ==
During Mohrael's burial many miracles took place. One being that a beam of light went forth from her mouth.

Before she was martyred Jesus appeared to her and promised that whoever mentions her name or intercedes through her that God would answer his/her requests because she accepted suffering with great joy and patience and that whoever calls his daughter after you then I will bless that house. Whoever writes your life story I will write his name in the book of life. Whoever takes care of your church, her servants and so on... then I will give him/her a place in heaven. Jesus also gave her many other promises, for her and for those who would take care of her story, her picture and so on....

== Celebrations ==
The Coptic Orthodox Church of Egypt has two celebrations for St. Mohrael. One is the consecration of her Church on (22 Mesra, in the Coptic calendar) or (Aug 28). The other celebration is for her martyrdom on (14 tubah, in the coptic calendar) or (Jan 22).

Since 1996/8/18 A.D. in a Monastery close to Saint Mohrael's birthplace there is a Chapel for Saint Mohrael. The Monastery is that of Saints Cosmas and Damian at Manyal Shihet in Giza on Hawamdeya Road.

In Al Kiraza journal - Issue dd. 30/1/1998, Pope Shenouda III of Alexandria published the news of an extensive meeting that was held, concerning this Saint, mentioning that she is a martyr and that she had a church in her name. Shenouda gave permission that anniversaries are to be held for her and nuns are to be ordained in her name in several convents.
