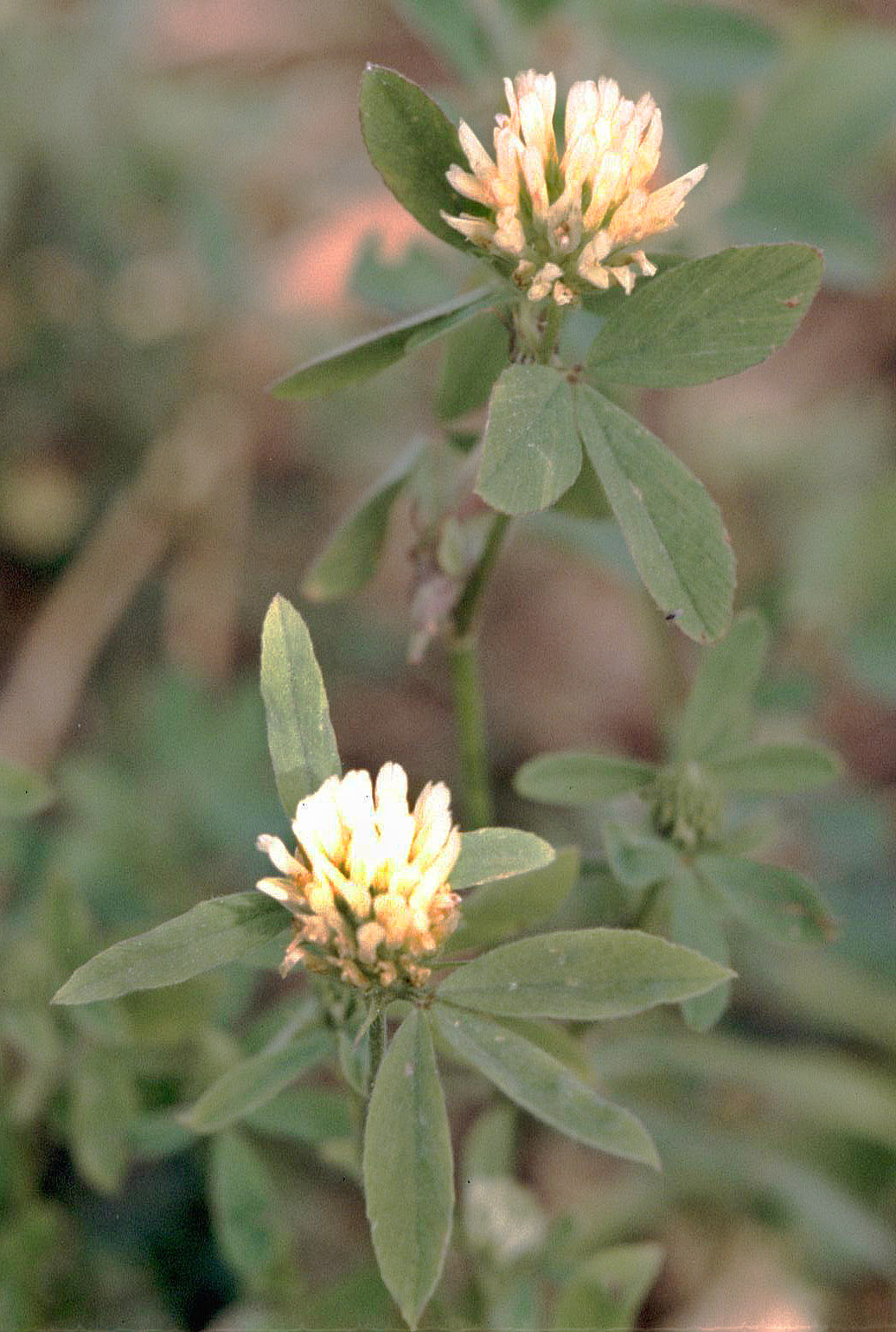

Scientific classification
- Kingdom: Plantae
- Clade: Tracheophytes
- Clade: Angiosperms
- Clade: Eudicots
- Clade: Rosids
- Order: Fabales
- Family: Fabaceae
- Subfamily: Faboideae
- Genus: Trifolium
- Species: T. alexandrinum

Binomial name
- Trifolium alexandrinum L.

Synonyms
- Trifolium albiceps Ehrenb. ex Sweet; Trifolium alexandrinum subsp. serotinum (Zohary & Lerner) P.Silva; Trifolium alexandrinum var. serotinum Zohary & Lerner

= Trifolium alexandrinum =

Species of flowering plant

Trifolium alexandrinum (Egyptian clover, berseem clover) is a species of clover. The plant can reach 75 cm (30 in) tall, with trifoliate leaves and whitish flowers. It is native to northeast Africa and southwest Asia.

== Description ==
The annual plant reaches 45 to 75 cm (18 to 30 in) tall with erect or ascending stems, the growth habit resembling red clover. The leaves are trifoliate, with slender leaflets. The flowers are white to creamy white, produced in inflorescences similar to those of white clover with around 100 flowers.

== Distribution and habitat ==
The species is native to northeast Africa and southwest Asia, from Egypt east to Pakistan.

== Cultivation ==
Egyptian clover is cultivated mostly in irrigated sub-tropical regions, and used as leguminous crop. It is an important winter crop in Egypt, where it may have been cultivated since ancient times, and was introduced into northern India in the early nineteenth century. It is also grown in northern Africa west of its native range, and in Australia, China, Europe and the United States, and is locally naturalised north to England.

There are two agricultural cultivar groups of berseem clover, single-cut and multi-cut. Single-cut cultivars, like 'Balady', feature a high growing point and have poor recovery once harvested. Multi-cut cultivars, like 'Frosty', feature a lower growing point allowing for multiple harvests from a single sowing.

It is generally frost-sensitive and should be planted only after potential for frost has passed. The exception is 'Frosty' berseem clover which was developed by Grassland Oregon, Inc. and released in 2016. This variety is capable of surviving temperatures as low as −15 °C (5 °F).

=== Forage ===
Egyptian clover provides highly nutritious fodder for livestock in winter season in repeated cuttings. Yields range from 44 to 71 tonnes per hectare of forage in a single growing season. It contains 17% crude protein, 25.9% crude fibre and 60–65% TDN (Total Digestible Nutrients) content. Berseem needs a mild temperature to germinate and further establishment. Its growth is restricted during severe cold or frosty weather. It grows well on medium to heavy soils and is tolerant of salinity, and is similar in forage quality to alfalfa.

=== Green manure ===
Egyptian clover can also be used as a cover crop suppressing weeds or as a green manure crop providing nitrogen to following crops. As a green manure crop, berseem is capable of providing from 300-400 kg/ha of nitrogen to following crops.
