= First Synod of Tyre =

The First Synod of Tyre or the Council of Tyre (335 AD) was a gathering of bishops called together at Tyre by Emperor Constantine I for the primary purpose of evaluating charges brought against Athanasius, the Patriarch of Alexandria, who was deposed by the council.

== Background ==
Athanasius was involved in the early Christian christological and trinitarian debates, and supported the position of the Council of Nicaea in opposition to that of Arius and his followers.

In 328, Athanasius was elected as bishop or patriarch of Alexandria. Alexandria happened to be the city in which Arius was a priest. Opponents of Athanasius tried to prevent him from becoming bishop by alleging that he had not been elected properly, or that Athanasius had not yet reached the age of 30, which was the minimum age for bishops in the church; at Tyre, they alleged that he had facilitated his election through bribery.

After Athanasius succeeded to the see of Alexandria, the Arians had accused Athanasius of, among other things: immoral conduct, illegally taxing the Egyptian people, supporting rebels to the Imperial throne, and even murdering a bishop and keeping his severed hand for use in magical rites. More to the point, Constantine was persuaded to ask Athanasius to re-admit Arius to the church—which he would not do. In 334 Athanasius was summoned before a synod in Caesarea, which he did not attend.

== The Synod ==
The emperor Constantine had ordered a Synod of bishops to be present at the consecration of the church which he had erected at Jerusalem (the precursor to the Holy Sepulchre). He directed that, as a secondary matter, they should on their way first assemble at Tyre, to examine charges that had been brought against Athanasius. The Emperor also sent a letter to Athanasius, making clear that if he did not attend voluntarily, he would be brought to the Synod forcibly.

Eusebius of Nicomedia played a major role in the council and, according to Epiphanius of Salamis, presided over the assembly. About 310 members attended. Athanasius appeared this time with 48 Egyptian bishops. The council affirmed Arius's views as orthodox, admitted the Melitians to communion, and condemned Athanasius, who had already fled, convinced that he was not getting a fair hearing; from there, Athanasius went to Constantinople to make an appeal to the emperor.

== Aftermath ==
According to Athanasius's account of the council, the emperor was sympathetic to Athanasius's cause until Athanasius's opponents produced the further charge that Athanasius had threatened to cut off the grain supply to Constantinople from Egypt. This one charge, which was important to the Empire's livelihood, was enough for the emperor to exile Athanasius to Trier, then part of the Gallic prefecture of Rome (in present-day Germany).

Athanasius did not return from exile until the death of Constantine in 337.

Arianism was ultimately condemned by the First Council of Constantinople in 381.

== See also ==
- 4th century in Lebanon
