= Jack P. Lewis =

American Bible scholar (1919-2018)

- Born: March 13, 1919; Midlothian, Texas, U.S.
- Died: July 24, 2018 (aged 99); Memphis, Tennessee, U.S.
- Occupation: Professor of Bible

Academic background
- Education: Harvard University, Hebrew Union College-Jewish Institute of Religion
- Thesis: "An Introduction to the Testaments of the Twelve Patriarchs." "A Study of the Interpretation of Noah and the Flood in Jewish and Christian Literature." (Harvard 1953, Hebrew Union 1962.)

Academic work
- Institutions: Harding School of Theology
- Main interests: History of the English Bible, Biblical Archaeology

Jack Pearl Lewis (March 13, 1919 – July 24, 2018) was an American Bible scholar affiliated with the Churches of Christ. He earned a Ph.D. in New Testament from Harvard University in 1953 and a Ph.D. in Old Testament from Hebrew Union College – Jewish Institute of Religion in 1962. For 50 years, Lewis taught Bible and biblical languages first at Harding University in Searcy, Arkansas, and then at Harding School of Theology in Memphis, Tennessee, where he was named professor emeritus upon his retirement. He authored over 223 articles in scholarly and church publications and published more than twenty-five books. He died in Memphis, Tennessee, on July 24, 2018, at the age of 99.

== Early life ==
Lewis was born on March 13, 1919, in Midlothian, Texas. He was one of four sons and one daughter born to Pearl Gaunce and Anna Elizabeth Holland Lewis. After graduation from Midlothian High School in 1936, Lewis entered Abilene Christian College (now University) where he majored in Bible and Greek. He spent summers selling books and Bibles for the Southwestern Company to put himself through school. After graduating with a B.A. in 1941, Lewis began preaching in Throckmorton, Texas, and pursued the M.A. degree in English at Sam Houston Teachers College. His thesis dealt with the use of poetry in sermons comparing John Wesley, Alexander Campbell, and N. B. Hardeman.

In September 1944, Lewis entered the Harvard Divinity School where he studied under some of the following scholars at Harvard: Robert H. Pfeiffer (Old Testament), Edwin Broome (Hebrew), Arthur Nock (History of Religion), Dean Willard Sperry (Preaching and Ministry), Henry Cadbury (New Testament), Harry AustryhnWolfson (Judaism), and George LaPiana and George H. Williams (Church History). He earned the Bachelor of Sacred Theology degree in 1947 and immediately began a Ph.D. program in New Testament with Harvard University. He finished his degree in 1953. His dissertation was "An Introduction to the Testaments of the Twelve Patriarchs".

In fall 1950, Lewis began work toward a Ph.D. in Old Testament at Hebrew Union College. His work involved intensive study of Hebrew, and he sat under Sheldon Blank, Elias Epstein, and Samuel Sandmel.

In 1954, Lewis moved to Searcy, Arkansas, where he accepted a teaching position with Harding College (now University). After four years teaching in Searcy, he moved to Memphis, Tennessee, where he was a charter faculty member of the Harding Graduate School of Religion (now Harding School of Theology). During his teaching career, Lewis led over 30 tours of Bible lands.

== Contributions to Academia ==
In April 1964, Lewis published an article on the Council of Jamnia in which he largely discredited the prevalent assumption that the Council of Jamnia decided the Hebrew canon. This article brought him academic recognition. He was invited to serve on the Bible translation committee for the New International Version and to contribute the notes to Hosea and Joel in the NIV Study Bible. He was asked to write several articles on the Council of Jamnia: "Jamnia (Jabneh), Council of", in Anchor Bible Dictionary, "Jamnia after Forty Years", in Hebrew Union College Annual, and "Jamnia Revisited", in The Canon Debate In 1989, he edited and contributed two chapters to Interpreting 2 Corinthians 5:14-21: An Exercise in Hermeneutics, which was a product of the Hermeneutics Project of the Faith and Order Commission of the World Council of Churches.

Lewis's teaching career included nearly fifty years of teaching a course in History of the English Bible. His book on The English Bible from KJV to NIV is one of the important works on the history of the English Bible. He maintained an interest in this area throughout his career. In 2004 in celebration of the 400th anniversary of the King James Version, at the invitation of the American Bible Society and its Eugene A. Nida Institute for Biblical Scholarship, Lewis presented a paper on the history of the printing of the KJV. This was published in Translation that Openeth the Window. He also published Questions You Have Asked about Bible Translations. Lewis's most recent release, The Day after Domesday: The Making of the Bishops Bible, is a study of the Bishops Bible, least known of the Tudor period Bibles and predecessor to the King James Version. At age 93, Jack Lewis published his autobiography, As I Remember It.

Lewis taught a variety of courses in the Old and New Testament and a number of his books grew out of these classes: A Study of the Interpretation of Noah and the Flood in Jewish and Christian Literature (published version of his dissertation at Hebrew Union), Historical Backgrounds to Bible People, Historical Backgrounds of Bible History, a two-volume commentary on The Gospel According to Matthew, The Minor Prophets, Exegesis of Difficult Passages, and Hebrew Wisdom and Poetry.

Lewis read papers at the meetings of the Society of Biblical Literature and the Evangelical Theological Society. He published at least 84 articles in eight different encyclopedias and dictionaries on a wide range of topics: Nelson's Illustrated Bible Dictionary, Theological Wordbook of the Old Testament, Baker's Dictionary of Theology, Wycliffe Bible Encyclopedia, Anchor Bible Dictionary, Baker's Dictionary of Christian Ethics, Zondervan Pictorial Encyclopedia of the Bible, and Encyclopedia of the Stone-Campbell Movement.

== Honors and awards ==
In 1967 and 1968, Lewis received a fellowship grant from the American Schools of Oriental Research to study as a Thayer Fellow in Jerusalem. He participated in an archaeological excavation at Aran. In 1968, he received the Twentieth Century Christian Education award in recognition of his "scholarly research, profound writing, and inspirational teaching".

In 1983, he was chosen Senior Fellow at the W. F. Albright Institute for Archaeological Research in Jerusalem. He served on the editorial boards of the Restoration Quarterly and Journal of Hebraic Studies. He served as president of the Southern section of the Evangelical Theological Society in 1969-70.

In 1994, Lewis was invited to be the commencement speaker at Hebrew Union College-Jewish Institute of Religion in Cincinnati. At the graduation ceremonies there in 2006, Lewis was awarded a Graduate Medallion as an outstanding alumnus.

In 2011, Heritage Christian University established the annual Jack P. Lewis lectures in his honor.

== Selected works ==
- Archaeological Backgrounds to Bible People. University Christian Student Center Annual Lectureship, 1969. Grand Rapids: Baker, 1981. ISBN 0801055075.
- Archaeology and the Bible. Way of Life Series. Abilene, TX: Biblical Research, 1975. ISBN 0891121137.
- As I Remember It: An Autobiography. Nashville, TN: Gospel Advocate, 2012. ISBN 0892255986.
- Basic Beliefs. Nashville: 21st Century Christian, 2013. ISBN 0890985316.
- Between the Testaments. Nashville, TN: 21st Century Christian, 2014. ISBN 0890986940.
- Biblical Archaeology: A Supplement. 2 vols. Edited by Eddie Cloer. Truth for Today Commentary. Searcy, AR: Resource Publications, 2015-2016. ISBN 0945441541.
- The Day after Domesday: The Making of the Bishops Bible. Eugene, OR: Wipf & Stock, 2016. ISBN 9781498233439.
- Early Explorers of Bible Lands. Abilene, TX: ACU Press, 2013. ISBN 9780891124511.
- The English Bible from KJV to NIV: A History and Evaluation. Grand Rapids: Baker, 1981. ISBN 0801055997. 2nd ed., 1991. ISBN 0801056667.
- Ethics of the Prophets. Henderson, TN: Hester Publications, 2001. ISBN 0971794871.
- Exegesis of Difficult Passages. Searcy, AR: Resource Publications, 1988. ISBN 0945441002.
- An Exegesis of Hosea, Joel, and Amos. Edited by Eddie Cloer. Truth for Today Commentary. Searcy, AR: Resource Publications, 2018. ISBN 9780945441649.
- The Gospel According to Matthew. 2 vols. The Living Word Commentary. Austin, TX: Sweet, 1976. ISBN 0834400650.
- Historical Backgrounds of Bible History. University Christian Student Center Annual Lectureship, 1969. Grand Rapids: Baker, 1971. ISBN 0801055075.
- Historical Backgrounds to Bible People. Henderson, TN: Hester Publications, 2008. ISBN B003K1SZ5I.
- "Jamnia after Forty Years." Hebrew Union College Annual 70-71 (1999-2000): 233-59.
- "Jamnia (Jabneh), Council of." In Anchor Bible Dictionary, 3:634-37. Edited by David Noel Freedman. New York: Doubleday, 1992. ISBN 0385193602.
- "Jamnia Revisited." In The Canon Debate, 146-62. Edited by Lee Martin McDonald and James A. Sanders. Peabody, MA: Hendrickson, 2002. ISBN 1565635175.
- Major Prophets. Henderson, TN: Hester Publications, 1999. ISBN 9780971794818.
- The Minor Prophets. Grand Rapids: Baker, 1966. ISBN 0801055091.
- Questions You've Asked about Bible Translations. Searcy, AR: Resource Publications, 1991. ISBN 0945441045.
- Studies in the Non-Writing Prophets of the Bible. Henderson TN: Hester Publications, 2006. ISBN B0017SSI6C.
- These Things Are Written: Bible Lectures Presented at Harding from 1952-2012. Searcy, AR: Truth for Today World Mission School, 2013. ISBN 9780982580271.
- Understanding Genesis. Nashville, TN: Christian Communications, 1987. ISBN 0892253002.
- "Yahweh: The God of Israel." In Restoring the First-century Church in the Twenty-first Century: Essays in the Stone-Campbell Restoration Movement in Honor of Don Haymes, 29-41. Edited by Warren Lewis and Hans Rollmann. Eugene, OR: Wipf & Stock, 2005. ISBN 1597524166.

== See also ==
- Bishops' Bible
- Council of Jamnia
- Development of the Hebrew Bible canon
- Simple English Bible
