= Development of the Hebrew Bible canon =

There is no scholarly consensus as to when the canon of the Hebrew Bible (or Tanakh) was fixed. Rabbinic Judaism recognizes the twenty-four books of the Masoretic Text—five books of the Torah, eight books of the Nevi'im (Prophets), and eleven books of the Ketuvim (Writings)—as the authoritative version of the Tanakh. Of these books, the Book of Daniel of the Ketuvim has the most recent final date of composition (chapters 10–12 were written sometime between 168 and 164 BCE). The canon was therefore fixed at some time after this date. Some scholars argue that it was fixed during the Hasmonean dynasty (140–40 BCE), while others argue it was not fixed until the second century CE or even later.

The book of 2 Maccabees, itself not a part of the Jewish canon, describes Nehemiah (around 400 BCE) as having "founded a library and collected books about the kings and prophets, and the writings of David, and letters of kings about votive offerings". The Book of Nehemiah suggests that the priest-scribe Ezra brought the Torah back from Babylon to the Second Temple of Jerusalem around the same time period. Both 1 and 2 Maccabees suggest that Judas Maccabeus (around 167 BCE) also collected sacred books.

== Sirach ==
The Book of Sirach provides evidence of a collection of religious texts similar to portions of the Hebrew Bible. The book, which is dated to between 196 and 175 BCE (and is not included in the Jewish canon), includes a list of names of biblical figures in the same order as is found in the Torah (Teaching) and the Nevi'im; it includes the names of some of those mentioned in the Ketuvim, as well. Based on this list of names, some scholars have conjectured that the author, Yeshua ben Sira, had access to—and considered authoritative—the books of Genesis, Exodus, Leviticus, Numbers, Deuteronomy, Joshua, Judges, Samuel, Kings, Job, Isaiah, Jeremiah, Ezekiel, and the Twelve Minor Prophets.

His list omits names from the Book of Ruth, Song of Songs, Book of Esther, and the Book of Daniel, indicating that those mentioned in these works did not meet his criteria of great individuals, that he did not have access to these books, or that he did not consider them authoritative. In the prologue to the Greek translation of Ben Sira's work, his grandson, around 132 BCE, mentions l the Torah, the Nevi'im, and a third group of books that was not yet named as Ketuvim (the prologue simply identifies "the rest of the books").

== Septuagint ==
The Septuagint (LXX) is a Koine Greek translation of the Hebrew scriptures, produced in stages between the 3rd and 2nd centuries BCE in Alexandria, Egypt.

According to Michael Barber, the Torah and Nevi'im are recognized as canonical books in the Septuagint, but the Ketuvim appear not to have been definitively canonized yet. The translation and editing work might have been carried out by a council of seventy (or seventy-two) elders, known historically as the Men of the Great Assembly (אַנְשֵׁי כְּנֶסֶת הַגְּדוֹלָה, Anshei Knesset Ha'Gedolah), who translated the Hebrew Bible into Koine Greek. Nonetheless, the historical evidence supporting the claim is incomplete, with uncertainties about the figures and process involved. Barber notes that it is virtually impossible to determine precisely when each of the other books was formally incorporated into the canon, given the complex, gradual process of canonization that varied across different Jewish communities and periods.

Philo and Josephus (both associated with first-century Hellenistic Judaism) ascribed divine inspiration to the Hebrew Bible translators, and the primary ancient account of the process is the c. 2nd-century BCE Letter of Aristeas. Some of the Dead Sea Scrolls attest to Hebrew texts other than those on which the Masoretic Text was based; in some cases, these newly discovered texts agree with the Septuagint.

== Philo ==
In the 1st century CE, Philo Judaeus of Alexandria discussed sacred books, but made no mention of a three-part division of the Hebrew Bible; although his De vita contemplativa, though sometimes suggested in the 19th century to be of later (and Christian) authorship, does state in chapter 3 (line 25) that "studying… the laws and the sacred oracles of God enunciated by the holy prophets, and hymns, and psalms, and all kinds of other things by reason of which knowledge and piety are increased and brought to perfection." Philo quotes almost exclusively from the Torah, but occasionally from Ben Sira and the Wisdom of Solomon, too.

== Josephus ==
According to Michael Barber, the earliest and most explicit testimony of a Hebrew canonical list comes from Josephus (37 CE – c. 100 CE). Josephus refers to sacred scriptures divided into three parts, the five books of the Torah, thirteen books of the Nevi'im, and four other books of hymns and wisdom:

For we have not an innumerable multitude of books among us, disagreeing from and contradicting one another [as the Greeks have], but only twenty-two books, which contain all the records of all the past times; which are justly believed to be divine; and of them five belong to Moses, which contain his laws and the traditions of the origin of mankind till his death. ... the prophets, who were after Moses, wrote down what was done in their times in thirteen books. The remaining four books contain hymns to God, and precepts for the conduct of human life.

Since there are 24 books in the current Jewish canon instead of the 22 mentioned by Josephus, some scholars have suggested that he considered the book of Ruth part of the book of Judges and the book of Lamentations part of the book of Jeremiah, respectively. Other scholars, including Catholic scholar Juan Carlos Ossandón Widow, suggest that at the time Josephus wrote, such books as Song of Songs and Ecclesiastes were not yet considered canonical.

According to Gerald A. Larue, Josephus's listing represents what came to be the Jewish canon, although scholars were still wrestling with problems of the authority of certain writings at the time that he was writing. Significantly, Josephus characterizes the 22 books as canonical because they were divinely inspired; he mentions other historical books that were not divinely inspired and that he therefore did not believe belonged in the canon.

== 2 Esdras ==
The first allusion to a 24-book Jewish collection of books is found in 2 Esdras, which was probably written c. 90 – c. 100 CE, after the destruction of the Second Temple. At the end of the narrative, Ezra receives the Holy Spirit and dictates 94 books. Then God tells him:

Make public the twenty-four books that you wrote first, and let the worthy and the unworthy read them; but keep the seventy that were written last, in order to give them to the wise among your people.

— RSV 14:45–46

There are no clues in the text as to which of these 94 books were considered the publicly revealed 24, but the publicly revealed books probably are the same or close to the 24 books of the Jewish scriptures.

== Rabbis ==
The Rabbis also debated the status of canonical books. In the 2nd century CE, Rabbi Akiva declared that those who read non-canonical books would not share in the afterlife. But, according to Bacher and Grätz, Akiva was not opposed to a private reading of the Apocrypha, as is evident from the fact that he himself makes frequent use of Sirach.

They also debated the status of Ecclesiastes and Song of Songs concluding like the tradition of Rabbi Simeon ben Azzai that they are holy. Akiva stoutly defended, however, the canonicity of the Song of Songs, and Esther. But Heinrich Graetz's statements respecting Akiva's attitude toward the canonicity of the Song of Songs are misconceptions, as I.H. Weiss has to some extent shown. He was antagonistic toward the Septuagint text family and the apocryphal books contained therein, since Christians drew so heavily from them.

== Council of Jamnia ==
The Mishnah, compiled at the end of the 2nd century CE, describes a debate over the status of some books of Ketuvim, and in particular over whether or not they render the hands ritually impure. Yadaim 3:5 calls attention to a debate over Song of Songs and Ecclesiastes. The Megillat Ta'anit, in a discussion of days when fasting is prohibited but that are not noted in the Bible, mentions the holiday of Purim. Based on these, and a few similar references, Heinrich Graetz concluded in 1871 that there had been a Council of Jamnia (or Yavne in Hebrew) which had decided Jewish canon sometime in the late 1st century (c. 70–90). This became the prevailing scholarly consensus for much of the 20th century.

W. M. Christie was the first to dispute this popular theory in 1925. Jack P. Lewis wrote a critique of the popular consensus in 1964. Raymond E. Brown largely supported Lewis in his review, as did Lewis' discussion of the topic in 1992's Anchor Bible Dictionary. Sid Z. Leiman made an independent challenge for his University of Pennsylvania thesis published later as a book in 1976, in which he wrote that none of the sources used to support the theory actually mentioned books that had been withdrawn from a canon, and questioned the whole premise that the discussions were about canonicity at all, stating that they were actually dealing with other concerns entirely. Other scholars have since joined in and today the theory is largely discredited.

Some scholars argue that the Jewish canon was fixed earlier by the Hasmonean dynasty. Jacob Neusner published books in 1987 and 1988 that argued that the notion of a biblical canon was not prominent in 2nd-century Rabbinic Judaism or even later and instead that a notion of Torah was expanded to include the Mishnah, Tosefta, Jerusalem Talmud, Babylonian Talmud and midrashim. Thus, there is no scholarly consensus as to when the Jewish canon was set.

== Bibliography ==
- McDonald, Lee Martin; Sanders, James A., eds. (2002). The Canon Debate. Hendrickson Publishers.
