= List of attendees and signatories of the First Council of Nicaea =

The surviving lists of the attendees and signatories of the First Council of Nicaea are in various languages and from different periods, containing various numbers of the bishops that attended the council. The Latin versions of fragments and complete lists are dated to 6–12th centuries, the Greek version to the 13th century, the Coptic version to the 11th century, the Syriac version dated to the beginning of 6th century and the Arabic version dated to 1398 but is much older. The Armenian versions are dated to the 16–17th centuries but originate from a single archetypal codex written at the beginning of the 11th century.

The list was organized from various sources and published in 1939 as The Original List of the Nicene Fathers by Ernst Honigmann, a historian of the Byzantine Empire, and has become the standard reference. It was translated into English in 2021.

Bishops from the dioceses of Hispania, Italiciana, East, Pontus, Asia, Thrace and Moesia attended the council.

Historically important attendees included Hosius of Cordoba (1), Alexander of Alexandria (4), Eusebius of Caesarea Maritima (26), Eustathius of Antioch (49), Jacob of Nisibis (77), Leontius of Caesarea Mazaca (91), and Aristaces (102). Most of the bishops attending the Council of Nicaea were Greeks.

Athanasius of Alexandria is not on the list but he was an assistant and secretary to Alexander of Alexandria at the council and later his successor. The extant lists of the attendees and signatories of the council were formulated at Athanasius' instigation in 362.

== List ==
List of attendees and signatories of the First Council of Nicaea held May to August of AD 325 in Nicaea

- 1. Hosius/Ossius of Cordoba (Diocese of Hispania)
- 2. Vitus (presbyter representing the Bishop of Rome, Diocese Italiciana)
- 3. Vincentius (presbyter representing the Bishop of Rome, Diocese Italiciana)

=== Eparchy of Egypt (Diocese of the East) ===
The term "Eparchy of Egypt" or "Diocese of the East" means recently a historical administrative division of the Roman Empire and later, to various Eastern Catholic dioceses in Egypt, particularly those within the Coptic Catholic Church

- 4. Alexander of Alexandria
- 5. Paphnutius of Thebes (omitted in some lists)
- 6. Harpocration of Alphocranon (Naucratis)
- 7. Adamantius of Cynopolis
- 8. Arbition of Pharbaithus
- 9. Philip of Panephysis
- 10. Potamon of Heraclea
- 11. Dorotheus of Pelusium
- 12. Gaius of Thmuis
- 13. Antiochus of Memphis (omitted in some lists)
- 14. Tiberius of Tanis
- 15. Atthas of Schedia

=== Eparchy of Upper (Thebaid) Egypt (Diocese of the East) ===
- 16. Tyrannus of Antinoöpolis
- 17. Plusianus (Volusianus?) of Lycopolis

=== Eparchy of Upper Libya (Diocese of the East) ===
- 18. Dachius of Berenice
- 19. Zopyrus of Barca

=== Eparchy of Desert Libya (Diocese of the East) ===
- 20. Serapion of Antipyrgus
- 21. Titus of Paraetonium

=== Eparchy of Palestine (Diocese of the East) ===
- 22. Macarius of Jerusalem
- 23. Germanus of Neapolis (Nablus)
- 24. Marinus of Sebaste (Samaria)
- 25. Gaianus of Sebaste
- 26. Eusebius of Caesarea Maritima
- 27. Sabinus of Gadara
- 28. Longinus of Ascalon
- 29. Peter of Nicopolis
- 30. Macrinus of Jamnea
- 31. Maximus of Eleutheropolis
- 32. Paul of Maximianopolis
- 33. Januarius of Jericho
- 34. Aetius of Lydda
- 35. Silvanus of Azotus
- 36. Patrophilus of Scythopolis (Beishan)
- 37. Asclepias of Gaza
- 38. Peter of Aela (Elath)
- 39. Antiochus of Capitolias

=== Eparchy of Phoenicia (Diocese of the East) ===
- 40. Zeno of Tyre
- 41. Philocalus of Paneas
- 42. Aeneas of Ptolemaïs (Acre)
- 43. Magnus of Damascus
- 44. Theodore of Sidon
- 45. Hellanicus of Tripolis (Tripoli)
- 46. Gregory of Berytus (Beirut)
- 47. Marinus of Palmyra
- 48. Taddhoneus (Anatolius?) of Emesa (Homs)

=== Eparchy of Coele-Syria (Diocese of the East) ===
- 49. Eustathius of Antioch
- 50. Zenobius of Seleucia
- 51. Theodotus of Laodicea
- 52. Alphius of Apamea
- 53. Philoxenus of Hierapolis (Manbij)
- 54. Selamanes (Solomon?) of Germanicea (Marash)
- 55. Piperius (Papirius?) of Samosata
- 56. Archelaus of Doliche
- 57. Euphratius (Euphrantius?) of Balanea
- 58. Phaladus (Palladius?)
- 59. Zoïlus of Gabala
- 60. Bassus of Zeugma
- 61. Basianus of Raphanea
- 62. Gerontius of Larisa (Shaizar)
- 63. Manicius of Epiphanea (Hamath)
- 64. Eustathius of Arethusa
- 65. Paul of Neocaesarea
- 66. Syricius of Cyrrhus
- 67. Seleucus
- 68. Peter of Gendarus
- 69. Pegasius of Harba-Kedem
- 70. Bassones of Gabbula

=== Eparchy of Arabia (Diocese of the East) ===
- 71. Nicomachus of Bostra (Bosra)
- 72. Cyrion of Philadelphia (Amman)
- 73. Gennadius of Heshbon
- 74. Severus of Soada/Dionysias
- 75. Sopater of Errhe of Batanea

=== Eparchy of Mesopotamia (Diocese of the East) ===
- 76. Aeithalas of Edessa (Ruha, Urfa)
- 77. Jacob of Nisibis
- 78. Antiochus of Rhesaena (Rhesaina)
- 79. Mareas of Macedonopolis (Birtha)
- 80. John of Persis

=== Eparchy of Cilicia (Diocese of the East) ===
- 81. Theodore of Tarsus
- 82. Amphion of Epiphania
- 83. Narcissus of Neronias
- 84. Moses of Castabala
- 85. Nicetas of Flavias
- 86. Eudaemon
- 87. Paulinus of Adana
- 88. Macedonius of Mopsuestia
- 89. Tarcondimantus of Aegae
- 90. Hesychius of Alexandria (Alexandretta)

=== Eparchy of Cappadocia (Diocese of Pontus) ===
- 91. Leontius of Caesarea Mazaca
- 92. Eupsychius of Tyana
- 93. Erythrius of Colonia
- 94. Timothy of Cybistra
- 95. Ambrosius of Comana
- 96. Stephen
- 97. Rhodon

=== Eparchy of Armenia Minor (Diocese of Pontus) ===
- 98. Eulalius of Sebastea
- 99. Euethius of Satala
- 100. Eudromius
- 101. Theophanes

=== Eparchy of Armenia Major (Diocese of Pontus) ===
- 102. Aristaces

=== Eparchy of Diospontus (Diocese of Pontus) ===
- 103. Eutychius of Amasia (omitted in some lists)
- 104. Elpidius (Helpidius) of Comana
- 105. Heraclius of Zela

=== Eparchy of Pontus Polemoniacus (Diocese of Pontus) ===
- 106. Longinus of Neocaesarea
- 107. Domnus of Trebizond
- 108. Stratophilus of Pityous (Pitsunda/Bichvinta)

=== Eparchy of Paphlagonia (Diocese of Pontus) ===
- 109. Philadelphus of Pompeiopolis
- 110. Petronius of Ionopolis
- 111. Eupsychius of Amastris

=== Eparchy of Galatia (Diocese of Pontus) ===
- 112. Pancharius of Ancyra
- 113. Dicasius of Tabia
- 114. Erechthius of Gdamaua
- 115. Philadelphus of Juliopolis

=== Eparchy of Asia (Diocese of Asia) ===
- 116. Theonas of Cyzicus
- 117. Menophantus of Ephesus
- 118. Orion of Ilium
- 119. Eutychius of Smyrna
- 120. Mithres of Hypaepa
- 121. Paul of Anaea

=== Eparchy of Lydia (Diocese of Asia) ===
- 122. Artemidorus of Sardis
- 123. Seras of Thyatira
- 124. Hetoemasius of Philadelphia
- 125. Pollion of Baris
- 126. Agogius of Tripolis
- 127. Florentius of Ancyra
- 128. Antiochus of Aurelianopolis
- 129. Mark of Standus

=== Eparchy of Phrygia (Diocese of Asia) ===
- 130. Nunechius of Leodicea
- 131. Flaccus of Sanaus
- 132. Procopius of Synnada
- 133. Pisticus of Aezani
- 134. Athenodorus of Dorylaeum
- 135. Eugenius of Eucarpia
- 136. Flaccus of Hierapolis

=== Eparchy of Pisidia (Diocese of Asia) ===
- 137. Eulalius of Iconium
- 138. Telemachus of Adrianopolis
- 139. Hesychius of Neapolis
- 140. Eutychius of Seleucia
- 141. Granius of Limenae
- 142. Tarsicius of Apamea
- 143. Patricius of Amblada (omitted in some lists)
- 144. Polycarpus of Metropolis
- 145. Academius of (Mustene/Pappa)
- 146. Heraclius of Baris
- 147. Theodore of Uasada

=== Eparchy of Lycia (Diocese of Asia) ===
- 148. Eudemus of Patara

=== Eparchy of Pamphylia (Diocese of Asia) ===
- 149. Callicles of Perge
- 150. Heuresius of Termessus
- 151. Zeuxius of Uarbe
- 152. Domnus of Aspendus
- 153. Cyntianus of Seleucia
- 154. Patricius of Maximianopolis
- 155. Aphrodisius of Magydus

=== Eparchy of the Islands (Diocese of Asia) ===
- 156. Euphrosynus of Rhodes
- 157. Meliphthongus of Cos

=== Eparchy of Caria (Diocese of Asia) ===
- 158. Eusebius of Antiochea
- 159. Ammonius of Aphrodisias
- 160. Eugenius of Apollonias
- 161. Letodorus of Cibyra
- 162. Eusebius of Miletus

=== Eparchy of Isauria (Diocese of the East) ===
- 163. Stephen of Batata
- 164. Athenaeus of Coropissus
- 165. Aedesius of Claudiopolis
- 166. Agapius of Seleucia
- 167. Silvanus of Metropolis
- 168. Antonius of Antiochea
- 169. Nestor of Syedra
- 170. Hesychius
- 171. Cyril of Humanada
- 172. Anatolius
- 173. Gordianus
- 174. Paul of Laranda
- 175. Quintus
- 176. Tiberius of Ilistra
- 177. Aquilas

=== Eparchy of Cyprus (Diocese of the East) ===
- 178. Cyril of Paphus
- 179. Gelasius of Salamis

=== Eparchy of Bithynia (Diocese of Pontus) ===
- 180. Eusebius of Nicomedia
- 181. Theognis of Nicaea
- 182. Maris of Chalcedon
- 183. Cyrion of Cius
- 184. Hesychius of Prusa
- 185. Gorgonius of Apollonias
- 186. George of Prusias
- 187. Euethius of Adrianopolis
- 188. Theophanes
- 189. Rufus of Caesarea
- 190. Eulalius

=== Eparchy of Europa (Diocese of Thrace) ===
- 191. Phaedrus of Heraclea

=== Eparchy of Dacia (Diocese of Moesia) ===
- 192. Protogenes of Serdica (Sofia)
- 193. Mark of Tomis (in Scythia Minor?)

=== Eparchy of Mysia ===
- 194. Pistus of Marcianopolis

=== Eparchy of Macedonia (Diocese of Moesia) ===
- 195. Alexander of Thessalonica
- 196. Pudens (Budis?) of Stobi
- 197. Pistus of Athens
- 198. Strategius of Hephaestias (Lemnos)

=== Eparchy of Thessaly (Diocese of Moesia) ===
- 199. Cleonicus of Thebes (in Phthiotis)
