= Simple English Bible =

Bible written in simple modern English

The Simple English Bible (1978, 1980) was an attempt to present the Bible in easy to understand, modern English. The version is based on a limited 3000 word vocabulary and everyday sentence structure. It is also marketed as the Plain English Bible and the International English Bible (see Plain English and International English).

The Simple English Bible was translated by International Bible Translators and the Bible Translation Committee included F. Wilbur Gingrich, Jack P. Lewis, Hugo McCord, Clyde M. Woods, S. T. Kang, Gary T. Burke, and Milo Hadwin. The chairman was Stanley L. Morris, who served as an editor in the Translation Department of the American Bible Society from 1968 to 1972 under Eugene A. Nida.

The God Chasers Extreme New Testament was a 2001 edition of the Simple English Bible New Testament with a new foreword by Tommy Tenney, author of GodChaser.
