= First Council of Nicaea =

Council of Christian bishops in Nicaea, 325

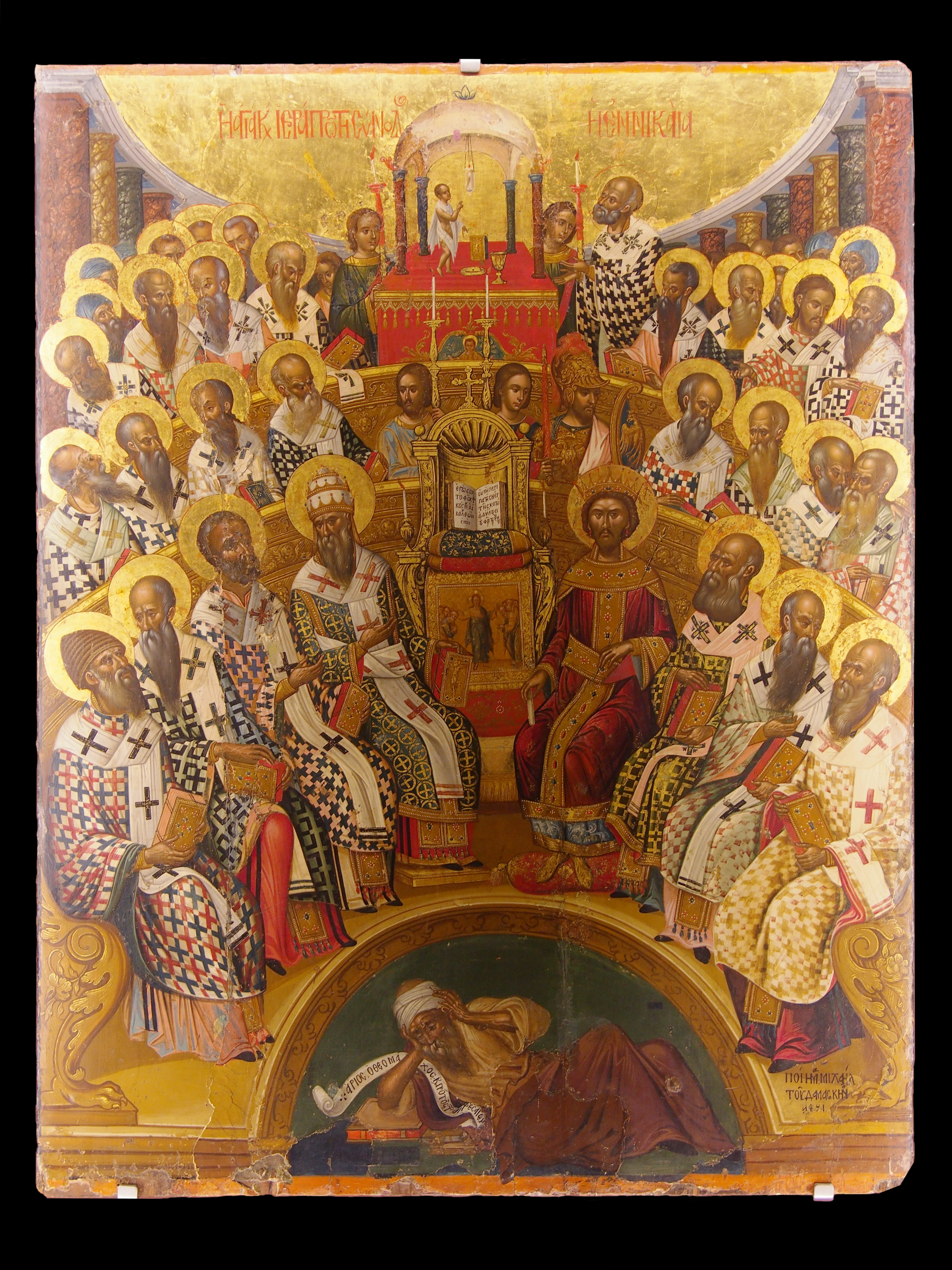
- The Council of Nicaea, with Arius depicted as defeated by the council, written by Michael Damaskinos, 1591
- Date: May to August 325
- Accepted by: Catholic Church; Eastern Orthodox Church; Oriental Orthodox Churches; Church of the East; Lutheran churches; Anglican churches; Reformed churches
- Next council: First Council of Constantinople
- Convoked by: Emperor Constantine I
- President: Hosius of Corduba
- Attendance: 318 (traditional number); 250–318 (estimates) – only five from Western Church
- Topics: Arianism, the nature of Christ, celebration of Passover, ordination of eunuchs, prohibition of kneeling on Sundays and from Easter to Pentecost, validity of baptism by heretics, lapsed Christians, sundry other matters
- Documents and statements: Original Nicene Creed, 20 canons, and a synodal epistle

The First Council of Nicaea was a council of Christian bishops convened in the Bithynian city of Nicaea (now İznik, Turkey) by the Roman Emperor Constantine I, also known as the First Ecumenical Council. It met from May until the end of July 325.

This ecumenical council was the first of many efforts to attain consensus in the church within the Roman Empire. Hosius of Corduba may have presided over its deliberations. It was attended by at least 200 bishops, almost entirely from the eastern half of the Empire. Its main accomplishments were the settlement of the Christological issue of the divine nature of God the Son and his relationship to God the Father, the construction of the first part of the Nicene Creed, the mandating of uniform observance of the date of Easter, and the promulgation of early canon law.

== Background ==
=== Alexandrian controversies ===
The major impetus for the calling of the Council of Nicaea arose in a theological dispute among the Christian clergy of Alexandria concerning the nature of Jesus, his origin, and relation to God the Father. Scholars propose dates between 318 and 322 for the beginning of the dispute. The precise origins of the controversy are unclear, but the principal actors were Archbishop Alexander of Alexandria and the presbyter Arius. Arius' teachings are known partially from a few pieces of his writings which survive, but principally from his opponents, primarily Alexander and Athanasius of Alexandria. Arius criticized Alexander's teachings on Christology; Alexander taught that Jesus as God the Son was eternally generated from the Father, while Arius and his followers asserted that the Father alone was eternal, and that the Son was created or begotten by the Father, and thus had a defined point of origin and was subordinate to the Father. Arius accused Alexander of following the teachings of Sabellius, who taught that the Father, Son, and Holy Spirit were one person, rather than the view held throughout the east that they were distinct. Alexander called a local council of bishops from Egypt and Libya, which sided with Alexander's view. Arius refused to subscribe to the council's decision, and he and several followers were excommunicated and exiled from Alexandria by Alexander. Arius then traveled to churches around the Roman east and wrote to bishops to gain support of his view. Among Arius' supporters were Eusebius of Nicomedia and Eusebius of Caesarea, and they advocated for his view and his restoration to the church in Alexandria. Alexander also circulated letters defending his own position.

Parallel to the theological controversy between Alexander and Arius was the Melitian schism in the Alexandrian church. Melitius, bishop of Lycopolis, had acted in the stead of the imprisoned bishop Peter I of Alexandria during the Diocletianic Persecution, but after Peter's death in 311 refused to give up his right to ordain clergy or recognize the authority of Peter's successors Achillas or Alexander.

=== Constantine and the calling of the council ===
In 324, the western Roman emperor Constantine defeated the eastern emperor Licinius and became the sole ruler of the Roman Empire. It was at this time that—likely from Eusebius of Nicomedia—he became aware of the controversy between Alexander and Arius. Constantine wrote a letter to the two, urging them to end their dispute and reconcile. This was not Constantine's first direct involvement in ecclesiastical controversy; he had previously attempted to resolve a schism over Donatism in North Africa, first appointing Miltiades, Bishop of Rome, to hear the dispute (with the instruction "I do not wish you to leave schism or division of any kind anywhere.") and then calling the Council of Arles.

Constantine's letter was carried to Alexandria by Bishop Hosius of Corduba as his representative. Hosius apparently then presided over a synod at Alexandria concerning the date of Easter, before calling a council of Eastern bishops in Antioch. This council endorsed Alexander's position and issuing a statement of faith that held that the Son was "begotten not from non-existence, but from the Father, not as made, but as genuine product" and contained anathemas against Arius. Eusebius of Caesaria was also temporarily excommunicated because of his contention that the Father and the Son were of two different natures.

Hosius prompted Constantine to call for a council. The bishops were then to assemble in Ancyra in Asia Minor for a "great and hierarchic council", either at their own impetus or Constantine's command. Constantine moved the council to Nicaea in Bithynia, a venue that would allow him to attend personally (due to its proximity to his capital at Nicomedia) and would allow easier access for bishops from throughout the empire. The emperor had also planned a commemoration of the twentieth year of his reign in Nicaea.

=== Attendance ===
The expenses of the council, including the travel of the bishops, were paid by the imperial treasury. Contemporary reports of attendance range from 250 to 300, with the figure of 318 given by Athanasius of Antioch becoming traditionally accepted. 318 is also the number of members of Abraham's household given in the Book of Genesis. Lists of signatories to the final decisions of the council contain 200–220 names. With presbyters and deacons attending each bishop, the total attendance may have been between 1200 and 1900.

Almost all bishops were from the Eastern Church, including about twenty from Egypt and Libya, fifty from Palestine and Syria, and more than one hundred from Asia Minor. One bishop each from Persia and Scythia were present.

The few western attendees were Hosius, Caecilianus of Carthage, Nicasius of Die, Marcus of Calabria, Domnus of Pannonia, and Victor and Vicentius, and two presbyters representing Pope Sylvester I. Of the eastern bishops, the principal supporters of Arius were Eusebius of Nicomedia, Eusebius of Caesarea, Menophantus of Ephesus, Patrophilus of Scythopolis, Narcissus of Neronias, Theonas of Marmarike, Secundus of Ptolemais, and Theognis of Nicaea. The principal anti-Arians included Alexander of Alexandria, Eustathius of Antioch, Marcellus of Ancyra and Macarius of Jerusalem.

The council was held in Nicea's imperial palace. The bishops most likely assembled in a rectangular basilica hall based on Eusebius of Caearea's description.

== Overview ==
Constantine opened the council with a formal entrance after the bishops arrived, with Eusebius describing him as "like some heavenly angel of God, his bright mantle shedding lustre like beams of light, shining with the fiery radiance of a purple robe, and decorated with the dazzling brilliance of gold and precious stones." He then gave an opening speech in Latin (rather than the Greek spoken by most of the attendees). Fifth-century church historian Socrates of Constantinople gives the date of the opening as 20 May 325, though it may have been later in June.

It is most likely that Hosius presided over the council's debates and proceedings as Constantine's representative. Constantine did join in the debates of the council (in Greek), but did not see himself as a voting member as he was not a bishop. No detailed acta of the council exist as they do for later councils, so the exact sequence of the council's debates is uncertain. Church councils at the time were modeled after the proceedings of the Roman Senate, with the presiding officer having a large degree of control, and participants speaking in turn based on hierarchy. Probably the first matter considered was the status of Eusebius of Caesarea and the other bishops excommunicated at Antioch, as this would determine whether they could participate in the rest of the council. According to Eusebius, his profession of faith was accepted and he was restored. An account by Eustathius of Antioch records a statement of faith by a Eusebius being rejected by the council, though this was likely Eusebius of Nicomedia.

A statement of faith based on earlier creeds was drafted (possibly by a smaller committee), and each line was debated by the council. All but two bishops subscribed to the final form of the creed as adopted. In addition to the Arian question, the council also considered the calculation of Easter, and adopted the Roman and Alexandrian method over the objection of several eastern bishops. The bishops also agreed to a resolution on the Melitian schism and issued twenty canons. The council closed in the first weeks of July, with the bishops invited to attend Constantine's celebration of his twentieth anniversary on the throne on 25 July. Both the bishops and the emperor issued letters recounting the councils' decisions to be circulated throughout the empire.

== Ecumenical Council ==
The First Council of Nicaea was the first ecumenical council of the church. Nicaea "was the first time that any attempt had been made to summon a general council of the whole church at which, at least in theory, the church in every part of the Roman Empire should be represented".

Derived from Greek (Ancient Greek: οἰκουμένη, romanized: oikouménē, lit. 'the inhabited one'), "ecumenical" means "worldwide" but generally is assumed to be limited to the known inhabited Earth, and at this time in history is nearly synonymous with the Roman Empire. The earliest extant uses of the term for a council are Eusebius' Life of Constantine around 338, which states "he convoked an ecumenical council" (σύνοδον οἰκουμενικὴν συνεκρότει, sýnodon oikoumenikḕn synekrótei) and a letter in 382 to Pope Damasus I and the Latin bishops from the First Council of Constantinople.

Historically significant as the first effort to attain consensus in the church through an assembly representing all of Christendom, the council was the first occasion where the technical aspects of Christology were discussed. Through it a precedent was set for subsequent general councils to adopt creeds and canons. This council is generally considered the beginning of the period of the first seven ecumenical councils in the history of Christianity.

== Outcomes ==
=== Nicene Creed ===
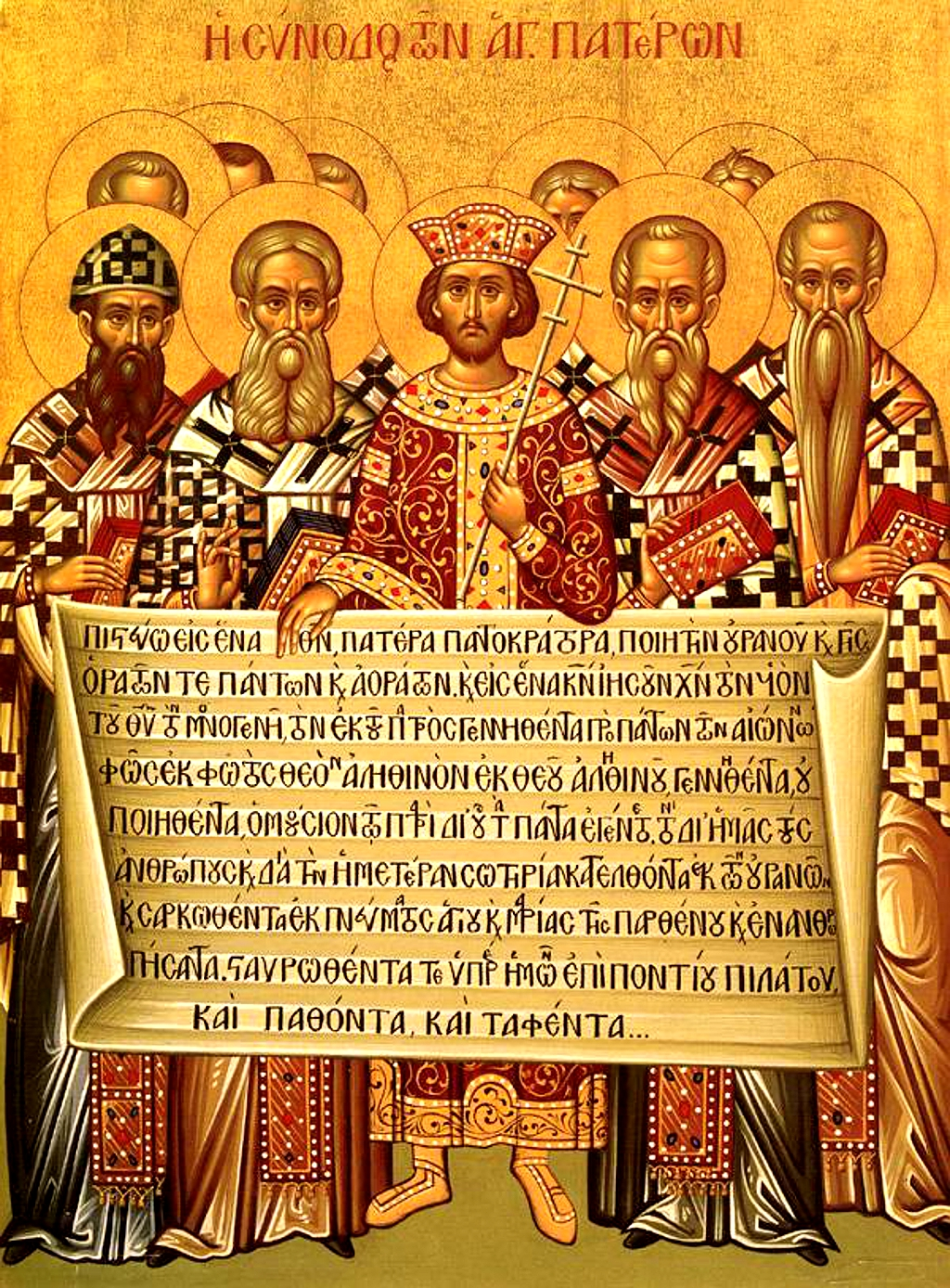
Icon depicting the Emperor Constantine and the bishops of the First Council of Nicaea (325) holding the Niceno–Constantinopolitan Creed of 381

The council formulated a creed, a declaration and summary of the Christian faith. Several creeds were already in existence; many creeds were acceptable to the members of the council, including Arius. From earliest times, various creeds served as a means of identification for Christians, as a means of inclusion and recognition, especially at baptism. In Rome, for example, the Apostles' Creed was popular, especially for use in Lent and the Easter season. In the Council of Nicaea, one specific creed was used to define the Church's faith clearly, to include those who professed it, and to exclude those who did not.

The original Nicene Creed read as follows:

We believe in one God, the Father almighty,
maker of all things visible and invisible;
And in one Lord, Jesus Christ, the Son of God,
begotten from the Father, only-begotten,
that is, from the substance of the Father,
God from God, light from light,
true God from true God, begotten not made,
of one substance with the Father,
through Whom all things came into being,
things in heaven and things on earth,
Who because of us men and because of our salvation came down,
and became incarnate and became man, and suffered,
and rose again on the third day, and ascended to the heavens,
and will come to judge the living and dead,
And in the Holy Spirit.
But as for those who say, There was when He was not,
and, Before being born He was not,
and that He came into existence out of nothing,
or who assert that the Son of God is of a different hypostasis or substance,
or created, or is subject to alteration or change
– these the Catholic and apostolic Church anathematizes.

The creed was amended by the First Council of Constantinople in 381.

==== Distinctive elements ====
Some distinctive elements in the Nicene Creed, perhaps from the hand of Hosius of Cordova, were added, some specifically to counter the Arian point of view.

1. Jesus Christ is described as "Light from Light, true God from true God", proclaiming his divinity.
2. Jesus Christ is said to be "begotten, not made", asserting that he was not a mere creature, brought into being out of nothing, but the true Son of God, brought into being "from the substance of the Father".
3. He is said to be "of one substance with the Father", proclaiming that although Jesus Christ is "true God" and God the Father is also "true God", they are "of one substance". The Greek term homoousios, consubstantial (i.e. of the same substance) is ascribed by Eusebius of Caesarea to Constantine who, on this particular point, may have chosen to exercise his authority. The significance of this clause, however, is ambiguous as to the extent in which Jesus Christ and God the Father are "of one substance", and the issues it raised would be seriously controverted in the future.

==== Anathemas ====
At the end of the creed came a list of anathemas, designed to repudiate explicitly the Arians' stated claims.

1. The view that "there was once when he was not" was rejected to maintain the coeternity of the Son with the Father.
2. The view that he was "mutable or subject to change" was rejected to maintain that the Son just like the Father was beyond any form of weakness or corruptibility, and most importantly that he could not fall away from absolute moral perfection.

Thus, instead of a baptismal creed acceptable to both the Arians and their opponents, the Council promulgated one which was clearly opposed to Arianism and incompatible with the distinctive core of their beliefs. The text of this profession of faith is preserved in a letter of Eusebius to his congregation, in Athanasius' works, and elsewhere. The Homoousians (from the Koine Greek word translated as "of same substance" which was condemned at the Council of Antioch in 264–268) were supported by Constantine and Hosius and were able to advance the use of the term, thus the creed was accepted by the council.

==== Exiled ====
The emperor carried out his earlier statement: everybody who refused to endorse the creed would be exiled. Arius, Theonas, and Secundus refused to adhere to the creed and were thus exiled to Illyria, in addition to being excommunicated. The works of Arius were ordered to be confiscated and consigned to the flames, while his supporters were considered as "enemies of Christianity". Nevertheless, the controversy continued in various parts of the empire.

=== Separation of Easter computation from Jewish calendar ===
The feast of Easter is linked to the Jewish Passover and Feast of Unleavened Bread, as Christians believe that the crucifixion and resurrection of Jesus occurred at the time of those observances. As early as Pope Sixtus I in the 2nd century, some Christians had set Easter to a Sunday in the lunar month of Nisan. To determine which lunar month was to be designated as Nisan, Christians relied on the Jewish community. By the late 3rd century some Christians began to express dissatisfaction with what they took to be the disorderly state of the Jewish calendar. They argued that contemporary Jews were identifying the wrong lunar month as the month of Nisan, choosing a month whose 14th day fell before the spring equinox.

Christians, these thinkers argued, should abandon the custom of relying on Jewish informants and instead do their own computations to determine which month should be styled Nisan, setting Easter within this independently computed, Christian Nisan, which would always locate the festival after the equinox. They justified this break with tradition by arguing that it was in fact the contemporary Jewish calendar that had broken with tradition by ignoring the equinox and that in former times the 14th of Nisan had never preceded the equinox. Others felt that the customary practice of reliance on the Jewish calendar should continue, even if the Jewish computations were in error from a Christian point of view.

The controversy between those who argued for independent computations and those who argued for continued reliance on the Jewish calendar was formally resolved by the council, which endorsed the independent procedure that had been in use for some time at Rome and Alexandria. Easter was henceforward to be a Sunday in a lunar month chosen according to Christian criteria—in effect, a Christian Nisan—not in the month of Nisan as defined by Jews. Those who argued for continued reliance on the Jewish calendar (called "protopaschites" by later historians) were urged to come around to the majority position. That they did not all immediately do so is revealed by the existence of sermons, canons, and tracts written against the protopaschite practice in the late 4th century.

These two rules—independence of the Jewish calendar and worldwide uniformity—were the only rules for Easter explicitly laid down by the council. No details for the computation were specified; these were worked out in practice, a process that took centuries and generated numerous controversies, some of which remain unresolved. In particular, the Council did not seem to decree that Easter must fall on Sunday. This was unnecessary as it resolved against the Quartodecimani, who celebrated on any day of the week, in favour of the Churches who postponed the celebration to the following Sunday. See the extract from the Letter of the Council of Nicaea to the Egyptian Church, cited above.

Nor did the Council decree that Easter must never coincide with Nisan 15 (the first Day of Unleavened Bread, now commonly called "Passover") in the Hebrew calendar. The Finnish Orthodox Church explains, "According to the definition of the Council of Nicaea in 325, Pascha is celebrated on the first Sunday after the full moon following the vernal equinox, but always after the Jewish Passover. The date of the vernal equinox was then defined as March 21." L'Huillier notes the success of this strategy - Orthodox Easter has never preceded Passover.

=== Resolution of the Melitian schism ===
The suppression of the Melitian schism, an early breakaway sect, was another important matter that came before the Council of Nicaea. Melitius of Lycopolis, it was decided, should remain in his own city of Lycopolis in Egypt but without exercising authority or the power to ordain new clergy; he was forbidden to go into the environs of the town or to enter another diocese for the purpose of ordaining its subjects. Melitius retained his episcopal title, but the ecclesiastics ordained by him were to receive again the laying on of hands, the ordinations performed by Melitius being therefore regarded as invalid. Clergy ordained by Melitius were ordered to yield precedence to those ordained by Alexander, and they were not to do anything without the consent of Bishop Alexander.

In the event of the death of a non-Melitian bishop or ecclesiastic, the vacant see might be given to a Melitian, provided he was worthy and the popular election were ratified by Alexander. Melitius' episcopal rights and prerogatives were taken from him. These mild measures, however, were in vain; the Melitians joined the Arians and caused more dissension than ever, being among the worst enemies of Athanasius.

=== Promulgation of canon law ===
The Council promulgated twenty new church laws, called canons (though the exact number is subject to debate), that is, rules of discipline. The twenty as listed in the works of Nicene and Post-Nicene Fathers are as follows:

1. prohibition of self-castration for clergy
2. establishment of a minimum term for catechumens (persons studying for baptism)
3. prohibition of a man and a woman who have both taken vows of chastity to live together in a chaste and non-legalized partnership (the so-called virgines subintroductae, who practiced syneisaktism)
4. ordination of a bishop in the presence of at least three provincial bishops and confirmation by the metropolitan bishop
5. provision for two provincial synods to be held annually
6. confirmation of ancient customs giving jurisdiction over large regions to the bishops of Alexandria, Rome, and Antioch
7. recognition of the honorary rights of the see of Jerusalem
8. provision for agreement with the Novatianists, an early sect
9. elders who had been ordained without sufficient examination were not to be recognized
10. elders who had lapsed but had not been found out were to be deposed
11. mercy was enjoined toward those who had lapsed without compulsion, even though it was recognized that they did not deserve it
12. those who had left the military but later sought out to be restored to their military position were to be excommunicated; depending on the sincerity of their repentance, they could be readmitted to communion earlier
13. those who were fulfilling penance could receive communion if they were dying, but if they got well again, they were to finish their penance
14. catechumens who lapsed were to have three years as hearers before being allowed to become catechumens again
15. bishops, presbyters, and deacons were not to wander into neighboring cities to officiate
16. clergy who refused to return to their home church were to be excommunicated, and the ordinations of those who were ordained by these wandering clergy were to be considered null and void
17. prohibition of usury among the clergy
18. precedence of bishops and presbyters before deacons in receiving the Eucharist (Holy Communion)
19. declaration of the invalidity of baptism by Paulian heretics
20. prohibition of kneeling on Sundays and during the Pentecost (the fifty days commencing on Easter). Standing was the normative posture for prayer at this time, as it still is among the Eastern Christians. Kneeling was considered most appropriate to penitential prayer, as distinct from the festive nature of Eastertide and its remembrance every Sunday. The canon was designed only to ensure uniformity of practice at the designated times.

== Effects ==
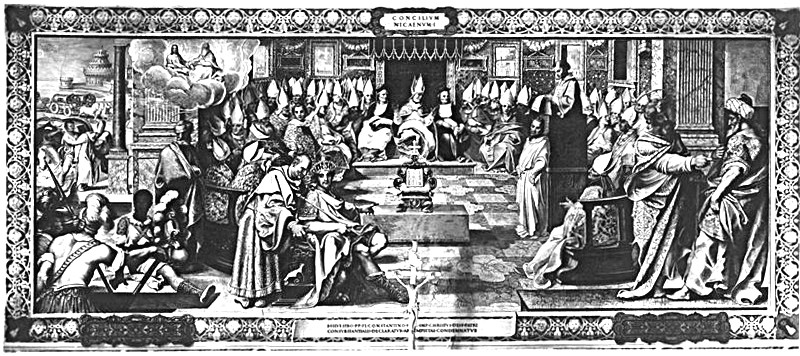
A fresco depicting the First Council of Nicaea at the Vatican's Sistine Salon

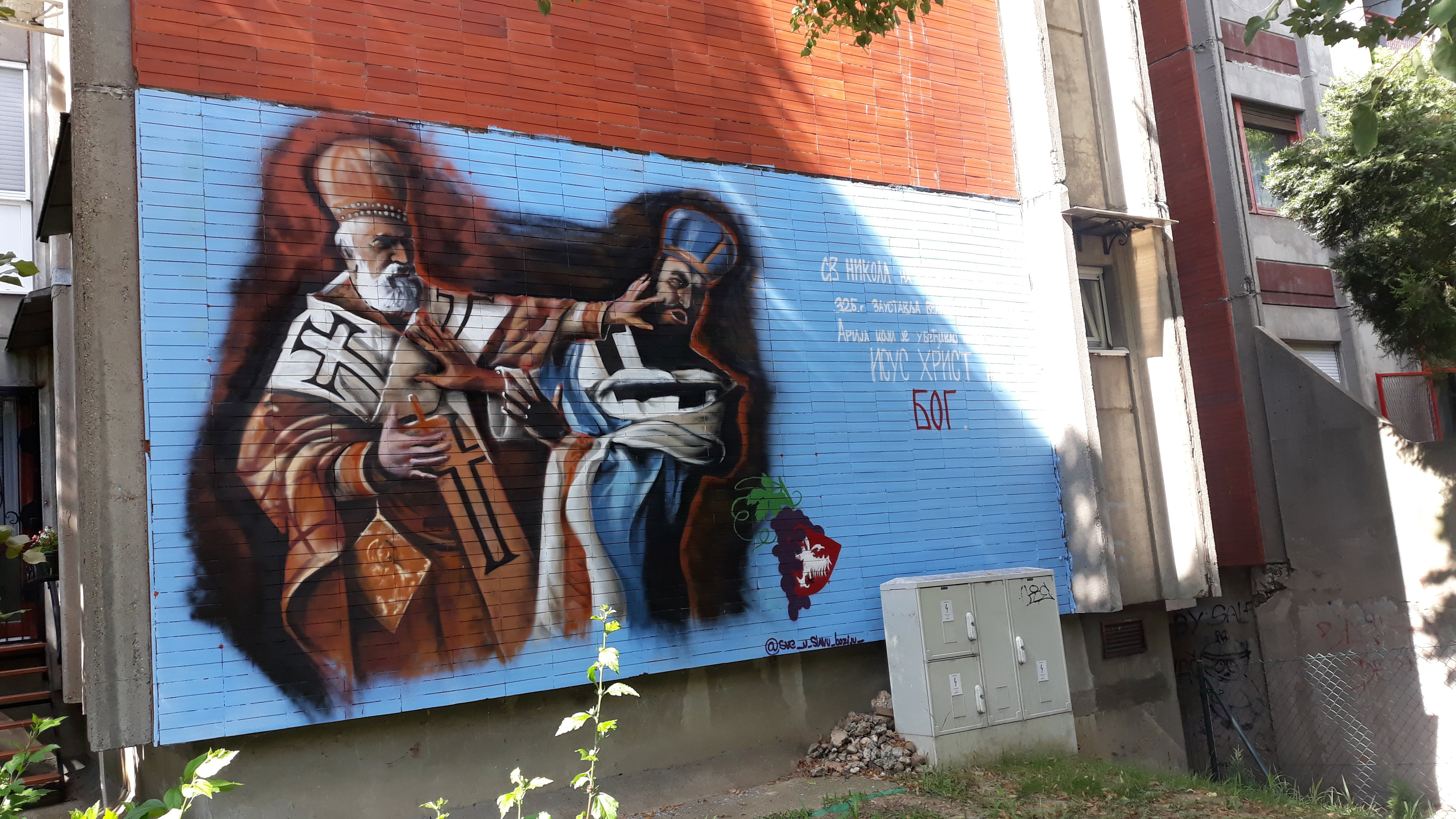
A mural in Belgrade, Serbia, depicting apocryphal events at the First Council of Nicaea. The text reads "St. Nicholas at the council in Nicaea in the year 325 stops the great lie of the heretic Arius who convinced the people that Jesus Christ is not God".

In the short-term, the Council did not completely solve the problems it was convened to discuss, and a period of conflict and upheaval continued for some time. Constantine was succeeded by two Arian emperors in the Eastern Empire: his son, Constantius II, and Valens. Valens could not resolve the outstanding ecclesiastical issues and unsuccessfully confronted St. Basil over the Nicene Creed.

Pagan powers within the empire sought to maintain and at times re-establish paganism into the seat of the emperor (see Arbogast and Julian the Apostate). Arians and Meletians soon regained nearly all of the rights they had lost, and consequently Arianism continued to spread and be a subject of debate within the Church during the remainder of the 4th century. Almost immediately, Eusebius of Nicomedia, an Arian bishop and cousin to Constantine I, used his influence at court to sway Constantine's favor from the proto-orthodox Nicene bishops to the Arians.

Eustathius of Antioch was deposed and exiled in 330. Athanasius, who had succeeded Alexander as Bishop of Alexandria, was deposed by the First Synod of Tyre in 335, and Marcellus of Ancyra followed him in 336. Arius returned to Constantinople to be readmitted into the Church but died shortly before he could be received. Constantine died the next year, after finally receiving baptism from Arian Bishop Eusebius of Nicomedia, and "with his passing the first round in the battle after the Council of Nicaea was ended".

== Role of Constantine ==
Christianity had only recently been legalised in the empire, the Diocletianic Persecution having ended in 311 under Galerius. Although Galerius stopped the Persecution, Christianity was not legally protected until 313, when the emperors Constantine and Licinius agreed to what became known as the Edict of Milan, guaranteeing Christians legal protection and tolerance. However, Nicene Christianity did not become the state religion of the Roman Empire until the Edict of Thessalonica in 380. In the meantime, paganism remained legal and present in public affairs. Constantine's coinage and other official motifs, until the Council of Nicaea, had affiliated him with the pagan cult of Sol Invictus. At first, Constantine encouraged the construction of new temples and tolerated traditional sacrifices. Later in his reign, he gave orders for the pillaging and the tearing down of Roman temples.

Constantine's role regarding Nicaea was that of supreme civil leader and authority in the empire. As Emperor, the responsibility for maintaining civil order was his, and he sought that the Church be of one mind and at peace. When first informed of the unrest in Alexandria due to the Arian disputes, he was "greatly troubled" and, "rebuked" both Arius and Bishop Alexander for originating the disturbance and allowing it to become public. Aware also of "the diversity of opinion" regarding the celebration of Easter and hoping to settle both issues, he sent the "honored" Bishop Hosius of Cordova (Hispania) to form a local church council and "reconcile those who were divided". When that embassy failed, he turned to summoning a synod at Nicaea, inviting "the most eminent men of the churches in every country".

Constantine assisted in assembling the council by arranging that travel expenses to and from the bishops' episcopal sees, as well as lodging at Nicaea, be covered out of public funds. He also provided and furnished a "great hall ... in the palace" as a place for discussion so that his guests "should be treated with becoming dignity". In addressing the opening of the council, he "exhorted the Bishops to unanimity and concord" and called on them to follow the Holy Scriptures with: "Let, then, all contentious disputation be discarded; and let us seek in the divinely-inspired word the solution of the questions at issue."

Thereupon, the debate about Arius and church doctrine began. "The emperor gave patient attention to the speeches of both parties" and "deferred" to the decision of the bishops. The bishops first pronounced Arius' teachings to be anathema, formulating the creed as a statement of correct doctrine. When Arius and two followers refused to agree, the bishops pronounced clerical judgement by excommunicating them from the Church. Respecting the clerical decision, and seeing the threat of continued unrest, Constantine also pronounced civil judgement, banishing them into exile. This was the beginning of the practice of using secular power to establish doctrinal orthodoxy within Christianity, an example followed by all later Christian emperors, which led to a circle of Christian violence, and of Christian resistance couched in terms of martyrdom.

== Misconceptions ==
=== Biblical canon ===
There is no record of any discussion of the biblical canon at the council. The development of the biblical canon was nearly complete (with exceptions known as the Antilegomena, written texts whose authenticity or value is disputed) by the time the Muratorian fragment was written. The main source of the idea that the canon was created at the Council of Nicaea seems to be Voltaire, who popularised a story that the canon was determined by placing all the competing books on an altar during the council and then keeping the ones that did not fall off. The original source of this "fictitious anecdote" is the Synodicon Vetus, a pseudo-historical account of early Church councils from 887.

In 331, Constantine commissioned fifty Bibles for the use of the Bishop of Constantinople, but little else is known (in fact, it is not even certain whether his request was for fifty copies of the entire Old and New Testaments, only the New Testament, or merely the Gospels). Some scholars believe that this request provided motivation for canon lists. In Jerome's Prologue to Judith, he claims that the Book of Judith was "found by the Nicene Council to have been counted among the number of the Sacred Scriptures". However, modern scholars such as Edmon Gallagher have doubted that this indicates any canon selection in the council.

=== Trinity ===
The Council of Nicaea dealt primarily with the issue of the deity of Christ. The term "Trinity" was already in use, with the earliest existing reference being by Theophilus of Antioch (AD 115–181), referring to Theos, the Logos, and Sophia (Father, Son, and Holy Spirit, as the Holy Spirit was referred to by several Church fathers), though many scholars believe that the way the term was used indicates that it was known previously to his readers. Also, over a century before, the term "Trinity" (Τριάς in Greek; trinitas in Latin) was used in the writings of Origen and Tertullian, and a general notion of a "divine three", in some sense, was expressed in the 2nd-century writings of Polycarp, Ignatius, and Justin Martyr. In Nicaea, questions regarding the Holy Spirit were left largely unaddressed until after the relationship between the Father and the Son was settled around the year 362. The doctrine in a more full-fledged form was not formulated until the Council of Constantinople in 381 and a final form formulated primarily by Gregory of Nyssa.

=== Constantine ===
While Constantine had sought a unified church after the council, he did not force the homoousian view of Christ's nature on the council. Constantine did not commission any Bibles at the council. Despite Constantine's sympathetic interest in the Church, he was not baptized until some 11 or 12 years after the council, putting off baptism as long as he did so as to be absolved from as much sin as possible.

== Disputed matters ==
On the historic position of Patriarchs holding authority in the Church, according to Protestant theologian Philip Schaff:

"The Nicene fathers passed [the sixth] canon not as introducing anything new, but merely as confirming an existing relation on the basis of church tradition; and that, with special reference to Alexandria, on account of the troubles existing there. Rome was named only for illustration; and Antioch and all the other eparchies or provinces were secured their admitted rights. The bishoprics of Alexandria, Rome, and Antioch were placed substantially on equal footing."

Thus, according to Schaff, the Bishop of Alexandria was to have jurisdiction over the provinces of Egypt, Libya and the Pentapolis, just as the Bishop of Rome had authority "with reference to his own diocese".

However, according to Fr. James F. Loughlin, there is an alternative Catholic interpretation. It involves five different arguments "drawn respectively from the grammatical structure of the sentence, from the logical sequence of ideas, from Catholic analogy, from comparison with the process of formation of the Byzantine Patriarchate, and from the authority of the ancients" in favor of an alternative understanding of the canon. According to this interpretation, the canon shows the role the Bishop of Rome had when he, by his authority, confirmed the jurisdiction of the other patriarchs—an interpretation which is in line with the Catholic understanding of the Pope. Thus, the Bishop of Alexandria presided over Egypt, Libya and the Pentapolis, while the Bishop of Antioch "enjoyed a similar authority throughout the great diocese of Oriens", and all by the authority of the Bishop of Rome. To Loughlin, that was the only possible reason to invoke the custom of a Roman Bishop in a matter related to the two metropolitan bishops in Alexandria and Antioch.

However, Protestant and Catholic interpretations have historically assumed that some or all of the bishops identified in the canon were presiding over their own dioceses at the time of the Council—the Bishop of Rome over the Diocese of Italy, as Schaff suggested, the Bishop of Antioch over the Diocese of Oriens, as Loughlin suggested, and the Bishop of Alexandria over the Diocese of Egypt, as suggested by Karl Josef von Hefele. According to Hefele, the council had assigned to Alexandria, "the whole (civil) Diocese of Egypt." Yet those assumptions have since been proven false. At the time of the council, the Diocese of Egypt did exist but was known as the Diocese of Alexandria, so the council could have assigned it to Alexandria. Antioch and Alexandria were both located within the civil Diocese of Oriens, Antioch being the chief metropolis, but neither administered the whole. Likewise, Rome and Milan were both located within the civil Diocese of Italy, Milan being the chief metropolis.

This geographic issue related to Canon 6 was highlighted by Protestant writer Timothy F. Kauffman, as a correction to the anachronism created by the assumption that each bishop was already presiding over a whole diocese at the time of the council. According to Kauffman, since Milan and Rome were both located within the Diocese of Italy, and Antioch and Alexandria were both located within the Diocese of Oriens, a relevant and "structural congruency" between Rome and Alexandria was readily apparent to the gathered bishops: both had been made to share a diocese of which neither was the chief metropolis. Rome's jurisdiction within Italy had been defined in terms of several of the city's adjacent provinces since Diocletian's reordering of the empire in 293, as the earliest Latin version of the canon indicates.

That provincial arrangement of Roman and Milanese jurisdiction within Italy therefore was a relevant precedent, and provided an administrative solution to the problem facing the Council—namely, how to define Alexandrian and Antiochian jurisdiction within the Diocese of Oriens. In canon 6, the Council left most of the diocese under Antioch's jurisdiction, and assigned a few provinces of the diocese to Alexandria, "since the like is customary for the Bishop of Rome also".

== Primary sources ==
There are no conciliar acts. The main historical sources are: the Ecclesiastical History by Eusebius of Caesarea, the History of the First Council of Nicaea by Gelasius of Cyzicus, and three orations of Athanasios Against the Arians and two epistles, one written in 350-351, concerning the decisions of the Council of Nicaea, which includes the Nicene Creed, and the other one On the Events of the Councils in Ariminum and Seleucia. Other primary sources are the following: Ecclesiastical History_{it} by Socrates Scholasticus and those of Sozomen, Theodoret of Cirrhus, and Rufinus of Aquileia. Theological aspects are also dealt with by Basil of Caesarea, Gregory of Nyssa, and Gregory of Nazianzus. Primary sources are collected on the Wisconsin Lutheran College's Fourth Century Christianity website.

== See also ==
- List of attendees and signatories of the First Council of Nicaea
- Ancient church councils (pre-ecumenical), church councils before the First Council of Nicaea

== Bibliography ==
=== Primary sources ===
Note: NPNF2 = Schaff, Philip; Wace, Henry (eds.), Nicene and Post-Nicene Fathers, Second Series, Christian Classics Ethereal Library, see also Nicene and Post-Nicene Fathers

- Fernández, Samuel, ed. (2024). Fontes Nicaenae Synodi: The Contemporary Sources for the Study of the Council of Nicaea (304–337). Brill Publishers. ISBN 978-3-657-79640-3.
- Eusebius Pamphilius: Church History, Life of Constantine, Oration in Praise of Constantine, NPNF2, vol. 1
  - Anatolius of Laodicea, "Paschal Canons quoted by Eusebius", The Ecclesiastical History of Eusebius
  - Eusebius Pamphilius, The Life of Constantine [Vita Constantini].
- Socrates and Sozomenus Ecclesiastical Histories, NPNF2, vol. 2
  - Socrates of Constantinople, The Ecclesiastical History of Socrates Scholasticus
  - Sozomen, The Ecclesiastical History of Sozomen
- Theodoret, Jerome, Gennadius, and Rufinus: Historical Writings, NPNF2, vol. 3
  - Constantine the Great, "Constantinus Augustus to the Churches quoted by Theodoret", The Ecclesiastical History of Theodoret
  - Eustathius of Antioch, "A Letter to the African Bishops quoted by Theodoret", The Ecclesiastical History of Theodoret
  - Theodoret of Cyrus, The Ecclesiastical History of Theodoret
- Athanasius: Select Works and Letters, NPNF2, vol. 4
  - Athanasius of Alexandria, De Decretis [Defence of the Nicene Definition]
  - Athanasius of Alexandria, Ad Afros Epistola Synodica [Synodal Letter to the Bishops of Africa]
  - Eusebius Pamphilus, Letter of Eusebius of Cæsarea to the people of his Diocese
- Jerome: The Principal Works of St. Jerome, NPNF2, vol. 6
  - Jerome, Prefaces to the Books of Tobit and Judith
- The Seven Ecumenical Councils, NPNF2, vol. 14
  - The Nicene Creed
  - The Canons of the 318 Holy Fathers Assembled in the City of Nice, in Bithynia
  - Athanasius of Alexandria, The Synodal Letter
  - Constantine the Great, "On the Keeping of Easter quoted by Eusebius", The Life of Constantine
- Chronicon Paschale [Paschal Chronicle]
- Pentecostarion, Archdiocese of Thyateira and Great Britain, 3 November 2008, archived from the original on 30 April 2016
- Chrysostom, John; Harkins, Paul W (trans) (1 April 2010), Discourses Against Judaizing Christians, The Fathers of the Church, vol. 68, Catholic University of America Press, ISBN 978-0-8132-1168-8
- Epiphanius of Salamis; Williams, Frank (trans) (1994), The Panarion of Epiphanius of Salamis, Leiden: Brill, ISBN 90-04-09898-4
- Hilary of Poitiers, Contra Constantium Augustum Liber [A Book Against the Emperor Constantine]
- Jerome, Temporum Liber [The Book of Times]
- Photios I of Constantinople; Walford, Edward (trans), Epitome of the Ecclesiastical History of Philostorgius, Compiled by Photius, Patriarch of Constantinople

=== Secondary sources ===
- Anatolios, Khaled (2011), Retrieving Nicaea: The Development and Meaning of Trinitarian Doctrine, Grand Rapids: Baker Publishing Group, ISBN 978-0-8010-3132-8
- Athanasius, (Patriarch of Alexandria) (1920), Select treatises of St. Athanasius in controversy with the Arians, Volume 3, Translator and Editor John Henry Newman, Longmans, Green and co.
- Atiya, Aziz S. (1991), The Coptic Encyclopedia, New York: Macmillan Publishing Company, ISBN 0-02-897025-X
- Ayres, Lewis (2004). Nicaea and its Legacy: An Approach to Fourth-Century Trinitarian Theology. Edinburgh: Oxford University Press. ISBN 9781139054133.
- Barnes, Timothy D. (1981). Constantine and Eusebius. Cambridge, MA; London: Harvard University Press. ISBN 0674165306.
- Brent, Allen (2022). "Melitian Schism". In Louth, Andrew (ed.). The Oxford Dictionary of the Christian Church (4th ed.). Oxford: Oxford University Press. ISBN 9780191744396.
- Cameron, Averil (2007). "Constantine and the 'peace of the church'". In Casiday, Augustine; Norris, Frederick W. (eds.). The Cambridge History of Christianity. Vol. 2. Cambridge: Cambridge University Press. ISBN 9781108427746.
- Carroll, Warren (1987), The Building of Christendom, Front Royal: Christendom College Press, ISBN 978-0-931888-24-3
- Danker, Frederick William (2000), "οἰκουμένη", A Greek-English Lexicon of the New Testament and Other Early Christian Literature (Third ed.), Chicago: University of Chicago Press, ISBN 978-0-226-03933-6
- Davis, Leo Donald (1983), The First Seven Ecumenical Councils (325–787), Collegeville: Liturgical Press, ISBN 978-0-8146-5616-7
- Drake, H. A. (2021). "The Elephant in the Room: Constantine at the Council". In Kim, Young Richard (ed.). The Cambridge Companion to the Council of Nicaea. Cambridge: Cambridge University Press. ISBN 9781108427746.
- Edwards, Mark (2006). "The First Council of Nicaea". In Mitchell, Margaret M.; Young, Frances M. (eds.). The Cambridge History of Christianity. Vol. 1, Origins to Constantine. Cambridge: Cambridge University Press. pp. 552–567. ISBN 9780521812399.
- Edwards, Mark (2009). Catholicity and Heresy in the Early Church. Ashgate. ISBN 978-0754662914.
- Ehrman, Bart (2004), Truth and Fiction in the Da Vinci Code, Oxford University Press, ISBN 978-1-280-84545-1
- Fairbairn, Donald (2009), Life in the Trinity, Downers Grove: InterVarsity Press, ISBN 978-0-8308-3873-8
- Gelzer, Heinrich; Hilgenfeld, Henricus; Cuntz, Otto, eds. (1995), Patrum nicaenorum nomina Latine, Graece, Coptice, Syriace, Arabice, Armeniace [The names of the Fathers at Nicaea in Latin, in Greek, Coptic, Syriac, Arabic, Armenian] (2nd ed.), Stuttgart: Teubner
- González, Justo L (1984), The Story of Christianity, vol. 1, Peabody: Prince Press, ISBN 978-1-56563-522-7
- Gwyn, David M. (2021). "Reconstructing the Council of Nicaea". In Kim, Young Richard (ed.). The Cambridge Companion to the Council of Nicaea. Cambridge: Cambridge University Press. ISBN 9781108427746.
- Hanson, R. P. C. (1988). The Search for the Christian Doctrine of God: The Arian Controversy 318-381. Edinburgh: T&T Clark. ISBN 0567094855.
- Jacobs, Ine (2021). "Hosting the Council in Nicaea". In Kim, Young Richard (ed.). The Cambridge Companion to the Council of Nicaea. Cambridge: Cambridge University Press. ISBN 9781108427746.
- Kelhoffer, James A (2011), "The Search for Confessors at the Council of Nicaea", Journal of Early Christian Studies, 19 (4): 589–599, doi:10.1353/earl.2011.0053, ISSN 1086-3184, S2CID 159876770
- Kelly, J N D (1978), Early Christian Doctrine, San Francisco: HarperCollins, ISBN 978-0-06-064334-8
- Kelly, J N D (1981), Early Christian Creeds, Harlow: Addison-Wesley Longman Limited, ISBN 978-0-582-49219-6
- Kieckhefer, Richard (1989), "Papacy", in Strayer, Joseph Reese (ed.), Dictionary of the Middle Ages, vol. 9, Charles Scribner's Sons, ISBN 978-0-684-18278-0
- L'Huillier, Peter (1996), The Church of the Ancient Councils: The Disciplinary Work of the First Four Ecumenical Councils, Crestwood: St Vladimir's Seminary Press, ISBN 978-0-88141-007-5
- Leclercq, Henri (1911), "Meletius of Lycopolis", The Catholic Encyclopedia, vol. 10, New York: Robert Appleton Company
- Leclercq, Henri (1911), "The First Council of Nicaea", The Catholic Encyclopedia, vol. 11, New York: Robert Appleton Company
- Loughlin, James F (1880), "The Sixth Nicene Canon and the Papacy", The American Catholic Quarterly Review, 5: 220–239
- Loyn, Henry Royston (1991), The Middle Ages, New York: Thames & Hudson, ISBN 978-0-500-27645-7
- Lyman, Rebecca (2021). "Arius and Arianism". In Kim, Young Richard (ed.). The Cambridge Companion to the Council of Nicaea. Cambridge: Cambridge University Press. ISBN 9781108427746.
- M'Clintock, John; Strong, James (1890), Cyclopaedia of Biblical, Theological, and Ecclesiastical Literature, vol. 6, Harper & Brothers
- MacMullen, Ramsay (2006), Voting About God in Early Church Councils, New Haven: Yale University Press, ISBN 978-0-300-11596-3
- McDonald, Lee Martin; Sanders, James A, eds. (2002), The Canon Debate, Peabody: Hendrickson Publishers, ISBN 978-1-56563-517-3
- McLay, Denis (2015), "An Examination of the Role of Ossius, Bishop of Córdoba, in the Arian Controversy", Ba (Hons) Dissertation – Durham University
- Newman, Albert Henry (1899), A Manual of Church History, vol. 1, Philadelphia: American Baptist Publication Society, OCLC 853516
- Newman, John Henry; Williams, Rowan (2001), The Arians of the Fourth Century, Notre Dame: University of Notre Dame Press, ISBN 978-0-268-02012-5
- Norris, Richard Alfred (trans) (1980), The Christological Controversy, Sources of Early Christian Thought, Minneapolis: Fortress Press, ISBN 978-0-8006-1411-9
- St Nicholas the Wonderworker and Archbishop of Myra in Lycia
- Lutz von Padberg (1998), Die Christianisierung Europas im Mittelalter [The Christianization of Europe in the Middle Ages], P. Reclam, ISBN 978-3-15-017015-1
- Rubenstein, Richard E (1999), When Jesus became God, New York: Harcourt Brace & Co, ISBN 978-0-15-100368-6
- Rusch, William G (trans) (1980), The Trinitarian Controversy, Sources of Early Christian Thought, Minneapolis: Fortress Press, ISBN 978-0-8006-1410-2
- Schaff, Philip; Schaff, David Schley (1910). History of the Christian Church. Vol. 3. New York: C Scribner's Sons.
- Smith, Mark S. (2018). The Idea of Nicaea in the Early Church Councils, AD 431–451. Oxford: Oxford University Press. ISBN 9780198835271.
- Tanner, Norman P (2001), The Councils of the Church, New York: Crossroad, ISBN 978-0-8245-1904-9
- Teres, Gustav (October 1984), "Time Computations and Dionysius Exiguus", Journal for the History of Astronomy, 15 (3): 177, Bibcode:1984JHA....15..177T, doi:10.1177/002182868401500302, S2CID 117094612
- Vailhé, Siméon (1912), "Tremithus", The Catholic Encyclopedia, vol. 15, New York: Robert Appleton Company
- Vallaud, Dominique (1995), Dictionnaire Historique (in French), Fayard, ISBN 978-2-2135-9322-7
- Van Dam, Raymond (2021). "Imperial Fathers and Their Sons: Licinius, Constantine, and the Council of Nicaea". In Kim, Young Richard (ed.). The Cambridge Companion to the Council of Nicaea. Cambridge: Cambridge University Press. ISBN 9781108427746.
- Ware, Timothy (1991), The Orthodox Church, Penguin Adult
- Williams, Rowan (1987), Arius, London: Darton, Logman & Todd, ISBN 978-0-232-51692-0
