= Bauer's Lexicon =

Dictionary of Biblical Greek

Bauer's Lexicon (also Bauer Lexicon, Bauer's Greek Lexicon, and Bauer, Arndt and Gingrich) is among the most highly respected dictionaries of Biblical Greek. The producers of the German forerunner are Erwin Preuschen and Walter Bauer. The English edition is A Greek-English Lexicon of the New Testament and Other Early Christian Literature.

== History ==
The origin may be traced to Erwin Preuschen's Vollständiges Griechisch-Deutsches Handwörterbuch zu den Schriften des Neuen Testaments und der übrigen urchristlichen Literatur (1910). Walter Bauer extensively revised this work, as Griechisch-deutsches Wörterbuch zu den Schriften des Neuen Testaments und der übrigen urchristlichen Literatur.

The first English edition was published in 1957. It is based on the fourth German edition (1949–1952) of Walter Bauer’s Greek-German lexicon (Bauer lexicon). The project began in the fall of 1949, when F. Wilbur Gingrich was granted a leave of absence from Albright College to work on a new Greek-English lexicon of the New Testament, translating and adapting the work of Bauer in collaboration with Dr. William F. Arndt. The work actually took 5 ½ years. This English edition is often referenced by an abbreviation of the authors - Bauer, Arndt, and Gingrich (BAG).

The second English edition was published in 1979 with the additional help of Frederick William Danker due to the death of Arndt in 1957. It is based on Bauer's fifth German edition (1957–1958). This second edition, Bauer-Danker Greek Lexicon of the New Testament, is commonly known as BAGD (due to the abbreviation of the contributors Bauer–Arndt–Gingrich–Danker).

The third English edition was published in 2000/1 by the University of Chicago Press, ISBN 9780226039336). It is based on the sixth German edition, which was published following Bauer's death in 1960, by Kurt Aland, Barbara Aland and Viktor Reichmann. Gingrich died in 1993, leaving Danker to complete the third English edition based on all the prior editions and substantial work of his own. Given the extensive improvements in this edition (said to include over 15,000 new citations), it is now known as Bauer–Danker–Arndt–Gingrich (BDAG) or sometimes the Bauer-Danker Lexicon.

A notable feature of the third English edition is vastly improved typography. This reflects early adoption of SGML technology. The entire lexicon was converted to SGML in the late 1980s at Dallas Seminary with collaboration from SGML experts interested in the project, and Danker actually did substantial editorial and authorial work in an SGML editing program. This technology permitted much more consistent and flexible typography, as well as information retrieval.

A Chinese translation of the lexicon, based on the third English edition, was published in 2009 in Hong Kong by Chinese Bible International Limited.

== See also ==
- Walter Bauer
- F. Wilbur Gingrich

== Sources ==
- Danker, Frederick W. A Greek-English Lexicon of the New Testament and Other Early Christian Literature. 3d ed. University of Chicago Press. ISBN 978-0226039336.
- Review by Rodney J. Decker.
- Rykle Borger, "Remarks of an Outsider about Bauer's Worterbuch, BAGD, BDAG, and Their Textual Basis", pp. 32–47, Biblical Greek language and lexicography: essays in honor of Frederick W. Danker, ed. Bernard A. Taylor (et al.). Grand Rapids: Wm. B. Eerdmans Publishing. ISBN 0802822169.
