= Stratophilus =

Fourth-century Nicene Father

Stratophilus was a bishop of the city of Pityus (now known as Pitsunda or Bichvinta) who attended the First Council of Nicaea (in 325 AD). Pityus was part of the Eparchy of Pontus Polemoniacus of the Diocese of Pontus. Two other bishops from Pontus Polemoniacus, Domnus of Trebizond (now Trabzon) and Longinus of Neocaesarea (now Niksar), were present. Stratophilus' church has been located within the annexe of the fort at Pityus; his flock may well have included some of the population of the hinterland where Christian symbols attest their interest, and many burials at a large cemetery beside the fort are evidently Christian. But Pityus was not in Lazica proper: perhaps Stratophilus' or Domnus' respective bishoprics reached into Lazica but so much can hardly be assumed.

Most of the bishops attending the Council of Nicaea were Greeks. Early eastern Georgian sources are unfamiliar with the historical Christianization in the western area of Egrisi (known in Greek as Colchis) and the establishment of bishoprics there presumably headed by Greeks and the participation of Stratophilus in the Council of Nicaea in 325 is not documented either. Greek priests were established in the eastern rim of the Black Sea and Stratophilus was likely Greek.

In the area the influence of Roman and Byzantine culture can be observed easily in ecclesiastical architecture and Pityus mosaics style and motifs are very close to Syrian and Palestinian work, the introduction of local elements and some non-Hellenistic decoration suggests that the mosaics were made by a local school. The presence of Christianity in the northwestern corner of Lazica was confirmed in 1952 when excavators discovered a fourth century three-aisled basilica at Pityus and in the fifth century the floor of the apse area was adorned with mosaic that is the earliest piece of large-scale Christian decorative art in either of the Georgian kingdoms.

By the 330s AD Christianity had become the state religion of eastern Georgia (Kartli) and presumably also of western Georgia (Lazica or Egrisi). As western Georgia had fallen within the orbit of Roman political and cultural influence the adoption of Christianity in this regions is not surprising. The First Epistle of Peter was partly addressed to Christians in Pontus, and Christianity had by 300 a bridge-hold in coastal cities. During the fourth century Lazica consolidated its territory from the outskirts of Trebizond to Pityus and from the Black Sea to the Likhi Range. By Theodosius I's death in 395, Laz aristocrats dominated a population of Laz, Mingrelians, Svans and Abkhazians.
