= Frederick William Danker =

- Born: July 12, 1920
- Died: February 2, 2012 (aged 91)

Academic background
- Education: Concordia Seminary; University of Chicago
- Thesis: Threnetic Penetration in Aeschylus and Sophocles

Academic work
- Discipline: theology lexicography
- Institutions: Lutheran School of Theology at Chicago; Seminex; Concordia Seminary
- Notable works: Bauer Lexicon

Frederick William Danker (German: [ˈdaŋkɐ]; July 12, 1920 – February 2, 2012) was a Christ Seminary–Seminex Professor Emeritus of New Testament at the Lutheran School of Theology at Chicago, Illinois. Danker was a noted New Testament scholar and the pre-eminent Koine Greek lexicographer for two generations, working with F. Wilbur Gingrich as an editor of the Bauer Lexicon starting in 1957 until the publication of the second edition in 1979, and as the only editor from 1979 until the publication of the 3rd edition, updating it with the results of modern scholarship, converting it to SGML to allow it to be easily published in electronic formats, and significantly improving the usability of the lexicon, as well as the typography.

Earlier English-language editions of the Bauer Lexicon were essentially translations and adaptations of Walter Bauer's German dictionary into English. Danker’s dictionary was essentially an entirely new work. He reportedly worked on the lexicon 12 hours a day, 6 days a week, for 10 years.

== Career ==
Professor Danker received his formal training at Concordia Seminary, where he satisfied requirements for a B.D. degree with a dissertation on the function of the Hebrew word הֶבֶל (hebel) within the book of Qoheleth. He then undertook his PhD studies at the University of Chicago, Department of Humanities, in classical studies, with special interest in Homer, Pindar, and the Greek tragedians, finally writing a dissertation on "Threnetic Penetration in Aeschylus and Sophocles".

From 1954 on, Danker taught at the Lutheran Church–Missouri Synod's Concordia Seminary in St. Louis, when he joined the team of Arndt and Gingrich and helped produce the second edition of BAG, then called BAGD. In 1974, he left with the majority of faculty members to form Concordia Seminary in Exile, also known as Seminex. On the voluntary dissolution of Seminex in 1983, Danker chose to go to the Lutheran School of Theology at Chicago, where he taught until his retirement in 1988. He then began his magisterial work on the BDAG, upon which completion the lexicon was finally released in 2000.

Having already produced BDAG (3rd ed) during his so-called "retirement", he spent his last years preparing The Concise Greek-English Lexicon of the New Testament which is not a condensation of BDAG but an entirely new, although shorter, lexicon of the New Testament.

== Awards and recognition ==
In 2004, a festschrift with the title Biblical Greek Language and Lexicography: Essays in Honor of Frederick W. Danker (ISBN 0-8028-2216-9) was published to celebrate Danker's work, including 18 essays on biblical Greek language and lexicography.

== Frederick W. Danker Depositorium ==
The Frederick W. Danker Depositorium is located within the Overton Memorial Library on the campus of Heritage Christian University in Florence, Alabama. In April 2010, Danker informed the staff of the Overton Memorial Library that he would be giving his entire personal library and papers to OML. The process officially began in October 2010 and continued until shortly after his death in February 2012. Housed within the Danker Depositorium are files of research conducted by Danker, personal correspondence, published and unpublished writings by Danker, and memorabilia from his home and office.

== Works ==
- A Greek-English Lexicon of the New Testament and Other Early Christian Literature. 3d ed. University of Chicago Press. ISBN 978-0-226-03933-6.
- The Concise Greek-English Lexicon of the New Testament ISBN 0-226-13615-9.
- 2 Corinthians - Augsburg Commentary on the New Testament ISBN 0-8066-8868-8.
- Benefactor: Epigraphic Study of a Graeco-Roman and New Testament Semantic Field ISBN 0-915644-23-1.
- A Century of Greco-Roman Philology Featuring the American Philological Association and the Society of Biblical Literature ISBN 0-89130-986-1.
- Creeds in the Bible (Biblical monographs) ASIN: B0006BOYBE.
- Invitation to the New Testament Epistles IV: A commentary on Hebrews, James, 1 and 2 Peter, 1, 2.
- Multipurpose Tools for Bible Study ISBN 978-0-8006-3595-4.
- Jesus and the New Age: A commentary on St. Luke's Gospel ISBN 0-800-62045-3.

== Sources ==
- Burton, Peter R. (2004). "A Brief Biography of Frederick William Danker". In Danker, Frederick W.; Taylor, Bernard Alwyn; Lee, John A. L.; Burton, Peter R.; Whitaker, Richard E. (eds.). Biblical Greek Language and Lexicography: Essays in Honor of Frederick W. Danker. Wm. B. Eerdmans Publishing. pp. xviii–xx. ISBN 0-8028-2216-9.
- Rykle Borger, Remarks of an Outsider about Bauer's Wörterbuch, BAGD, BDAG, and Their Textual Basis, pp. 32–47, Biblical Greek language and lexicography: essays in honor of Frederick W. Danker, ed. Bernard A. Taylor (et al.). Grand Rapids: Wm. B. Eerdmans Publishing. ISBN 0-8028-2216-9.
