= F. Wilbur Gingrich =

American biblical scholar

- Born: Felix Wilbur Gingrich; September 27, 1901; Annville, Pennsylvania, US
- Died: October 19, 1993 (aged 92); Reading, Pennsylvania, US
- Occupation: Academic

Academic background
- Education: University of Chicago (MA, PhD); Lafayette College (BA)

Academic work
- Discipline: Classical languages
- Sub-discipline: New Testament scholar
- Institutions: Albright College

Felix Wilbur Gingrich (27 September 1901 – 19 October 1993) was an American educator, scholar of Biblical Greek, and Christian layman who spent his entire career working with students at Albright College in Reading, Pennsylvania. Gingrich published many books and articles, including a definitive translation of a Greek-English lexicon of the New Testament.

== Personal life ==
Gingrich was born on September 27, 1901, in Annville, Pennsylvania, the son of the Rev. Felix Moyer Gingrich and his wife, Minnie (Shiffer) Gingrich. Gingrich had two brothers, Wendell and Newell, and a sister, Esther. On March 28, 1929, he married Lola Engel and they had three children, John, Barbara and Carolsue. Lola Gingrich died on March 24, 1984. Gingrich died in Reading, Pennsylvania, on October 19, 1993, and is buried in Forest Hills Memorial Park in Reiffton, Pennsylvania.

== Education ==
Gingrich attended the Northeast High School in Philadelphia. He obtained a Bachelor of Arts degree with honors from Lafayette College in 1923. He was elected to Phi Beta Kappa while at the school. After doing research work at the University of Pennsylvania from 1923 to 1925, he went to the University of Chicago where he received his master’s and doctorate degrees in 1927 and 1932 respectively. Gingrich’s doctoral dissertation, carried out in the Department of New Testament and Early Christian Literature, was entitled Paul’s Ethical Vocabulary, a treatise on the language and style of Saint Paul’s letters.

== Teaching ==
After graduation from Lafayette College in 1923, Gingrich was hired by Schuylkill College, Reading, Pa., as an assistant professor, teaching Greek, Latin, German, and the Bible. Schuylkill College was an institution of the Evangelical Church, newly reunited from the United Evangelical Church and the Evangelical Association. In 1928, it was decided to merge with Albright College at Myerstown with Schuylkill College. The merged institution became Albright College, located on the Schuylkill campus in Reading. Gingrich became Professor of Greek and head of the Classical Languages Department, a position he held until his retirement in 1972.

== Research ==
In the fall of 1949, Gingrich was granted a leave of absence to work on a new Greek-English lexicon of the New Testament, translating and adapting the work of Walter Bauer’s Greek-German lexicon in collaboration with William F. Arndt. The work actually took 5 1/2 years. Gingrich returned to his teaching duties in February 1955.

The 1957 publication of the first edition of A Greek-English Lexicon of the New Testament and Other Early Christian Literature: Translation and Adaptation of Walter Bauer's Griechisch-Deutsches Wörterbuch zu den Schriften des Neuen Testaments und der übrigen urchristlichen Literatur, fourth revised and augmented edition, 1952 was the first lexicon since the 1880s and was internationally recognized. In 1979, Gingrich and Frederick William Danker produced a second English edition from Bauer’s 5th German edition. In 1965, Gingrich published the Shorter Lexicon of the Greek New Testament. Danker revised this in 1983 and that version was the basis of the Portuguese translation by Júlio P. T. Zabatiero.

In addition to his work on the lexicon, Gingrich published many articles and book reviews, some of which are listed in the list of selected works.

In 1956, the centennial year of the founding of Albright College and its predecessors, Gingrich and Dr. Eugene Barth wrote A History of Albright College, 1856-1956. Barth later updated and continued the work in Discovery and Promise: A History of Albright College, 1856-1981.

== Awards and recognition ==
At a retirement dinner in 1972, Gingrich was cited for his contributions to education and his research on New Testament Greek. A Festschrift was published in his honor that year. The library at Albright College was renamed the F. Wilbur Gingrich Library in May 1980. The college awarded him an honorary doctor of letters in 1983. In addition to international recognition for his years of work, he also received many awards and prizes honoring his research and teaching.

== Selected bibliography ==
=== Books ===
- Arndt, William, F. Wilbur Gingrich, John R. Alsop, and Walter Bauer. A Greek-English Lexicon of the New Testament and Other Early Christian Literature; A Translation and Adaptation of Walter Bauer's Griechisch-Deutsches Wörterbuch Zu Den Schriften Des Neuen Testaments Und Der Übringen Urchristlichen Literatur, 4th Rev. and Augm. Ed., 1952. Chicago: University of Chicago Press, 1957.
- Arndt, William, F. Wilbur Gingrich, Frederick W. Danker, and Walter Bauer. A Greek-English Lexicon of the New Testament and Other Early Christian Literature: A Translation and Adaptation of the Fourth Revised and Augmented Edition of Walter Bauer's Griechisch-Deutsches Wörterbuch Zu Den Schriften Des Neuen Testaments Und Der Übrigen Urchristlichen Literatur. Chicago: University of Chicago Press, 1979.
- Barth, Eugene Howard, and F. Wilbur Gingrich. Discovery and Promise : A History of Albright College, 1856-1981. Reading, Pa: Albright College, 1989.
- Barth, Eugene Howard, Ronald Edwin Cocroft, Irvin W. Batdorf, and F. Wilbur Gingrich. Festschrift to Honor F. Wilbur Gingrich Lexicographer, Scholar, Teacher, and Committed Christian Layman. Leiden: E.J. Brill, 1972.
- Gingrich, F. Wilbur, Eugene Howard Barth, and Ronald Edwin Cocroft. Festschrift to Honor F. Wilbur Gingrich, Lexicographer, Scholar, Teacher, and Committed Christian Layman. Leiden: Brill, 1972.
- Gingrich, F. Wilbur, and Eugene Howard Barth. A History of Albright College, 1856-1956. Reading, Pa: Albright College, 1956.
- Gingrich, F. Wilbur. [thesis] Paul's Ethical Vocabulary. 1932.
- Gingrich, F. Wilbur, and Walter Bauer. Griechisch-deutsches Wörterbuch zu den Schriften des Neuen Testaments und der übrigen urchristlichen Literatur, and Arndt, William. Greek-English lexicon of the New Testament and other early Christian literature. Shorter Lexicon of the Greek New Testament. Chicago: University of Chicago Press, 1965.
- Gingrich, F. Wilbur, Walter Bauer, and William Arndt. Shorter Lexicon of the Greek New Testament. Chicago: University of Chicago Press, 1965.
- Gingrich, F. Wilbur, Frederick W. Danker, Júlio Paulo Tavares Zabatiero, and Walter Bauer. Léxico do Novo Testamento grego/português. São Paulo, [Brasil]: Sociedade Religiosa Edições Vida Nova, 1984.

=== Articles ===
- Gingrich, F. Wilbur. "Ambiguity of Word Meaning in John's Gospel." The Classical Weekly 37.7 (1943): 77.
- ---, "The Classics and the New Testament." Anglican Theological Review 15.4 (1933): 300-4.
- ---, "The Contributions of Professor Walter Bauer to New Testament Lexography." New Testament Studies 9 (1962): 300-4.
- ---, "The Greek New Testament as a Landmark in the Course of Semantic Change." Journal of Biblical Literature 73.4 (1954): 189-96.
- ---, "Mayor Shirk of Reading." Church and Home 2 (1965): 12-5.
- ---, "New Testament Lexography and the Future." Journal of Religion 25.3 (1945): 179-182.
- ---, "Prolegomena to a Study of the Christian Element in the Vocabulary of the New Testament and Apostolic Fathers." Search the Scriptures : New Testament Studies in Honor of Raymond T. Stamm. Ed. Jacob Martin Myers, Otto Reimherr, and Howard N. Bream. Leiden: E. J. Brill, 1969. [173]-178.
- ---, The Words Paul Coined." Anglican Theological Review 17.4 (1935): 234-6.

=== Reviews ===
- Gingrich, F. Wilbur. "Aux Sources de la Tradition Chrétienne: Mélanges Offerts à M. Maurice Goguel." The Journal of Religion 31.4 (1951): 300-1.
- ---. "A Beginning Greek Book: Based on the Gospel According to Mark." Journal of Bible and Religion 15.1 (1947): 61-2.
- ---. "Eight American Praxapostoloi." Journal of Bible and Religion 9.2 (1941): 117-8.
- ---. "The Formation of Christian Dogma." Journal of Bible and Religion 27.3 (1959): 251
- ---. “Griechisch-Deutsches Wörterbuch zu den Schriften des Neuen Testaments und der Übrigen Urchristlichen Literatur." Journal of Biblical Literature 72.3 (1953): 196-7.
- ---. "Hellenistic Greek Texts." Journal of Bible and Religion 15.4 (1947): 258-60.
- ---. "An Introduction to the New Testament; Einleitung in Das Neue Testament." The Classical Weekly 31.15 (1938): 147-8.
- ---. “Lexicon Athanasianum, Fascs. 1-4 (A. Theos)." The Journal of Religion 31.3 (1951): 230.
- ---. “The Lord's Supper in Protestantism." Journal of Bible and Religion 14.4 (1946): 233.
- ---. “The Origins of the Gospels." The Classical Weekly 32.13 (1939): 152-3.
- ---. “The Silent Billion Speak." Journal of Bible and Religion 13.3 (1945): 170-1.
- ---. “Theologie und Geschichte des Judenchristentums." Journal of Bible and Religion 18.3 (1950): 199-200.
- ---. "Le Vocabulaire Chrétien de l'Amour Est-Il Original?" Journal of Biblical Literature 88.1 (1969): 107-8.
- ---. “Zur Typologie des Johannesevangeliums; Ergazesthai (Apc 18:17, Hes 48:18, 19). Die Wurzel SAP im NT und AT. Zwei Beiträge zur Lexikographie der Griechischen Bibel; the Ascension of the Apostle and the Heavenly Book (King and Saviour III)." Journal of Bible and Religion 19.4 (1951): 224-5.

== See also ==
- Bauer's Lexicon
- Walter Bauer

== Sources ==
- Barth, Eugene Howard. "A Tribute to F. Wilbur Gingrich." The Albright Reporter (1994): 11.
- Cocroft, Ronald Edwin. "Reminiscences." The Albright Reporter (1994): 11-2.
- "Dr. F. Wilbur Gingrich, Albright Professor Emeritus." Reading Eagle Oct 21, 1993: 23.
- Malko, Kristin A. "R. F. Wilber [sic] Gingrich : An Honored Man." The Albrightian November 5, 1993: 1,3.
- "The Rev. Felix M. Gingrich." The Telescope-Messenger (1958): 14.
