= Hosius of Corduba =

Spanish bishop (256–359)

Saint Hosius of Corduba
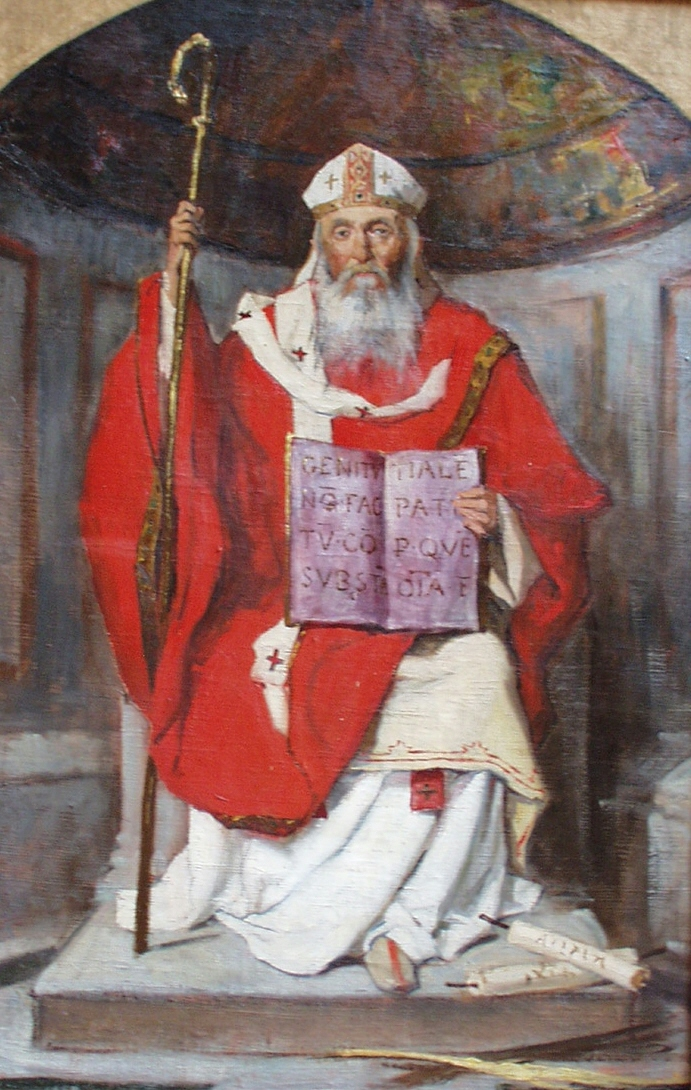
- Diocese: Corduba, today's Córdoba
- See: Córdoba

Personal details
- Born: 256 Corduba, Hispania, Roman Empire
- Died: 359 (aged 102–103)
- Denomination: Christianity

Sainthood
- Feast day: 27 August
- Venerated in: Eastern Orthodox Church; Roman Catholic Church; Oriental Orthodox Churches
- Title as Saint: Bishop of Corduba, Venerable Hieroconfessor
- Attributes: Scroll, episcopal vestments

Hosius of Corduba (c. 256–359), also known as Hosius the Confessor, Osius or Ossius, was a bishop of Corduba (now Córdoba, Spain) and an important and prominent advocate for homoousion Christianity during the period when the Arian controversy divided early Christianity.

He probably presided at the First Council of Nicaea and also presided at the Council of Serdica.

After Lactantius, he was the closest Christian advisor to Emperor Constantine the Great and guided the content of public utterances, such as Constantine's Oration to the Saints, addressed to the assembled bishops.

He is venerated as a saint in the Eastern Orthodox Church, Roman Catholic Church and Oriental churches, with the title of confessor of the faith, being commemorated with a feast day on 27 August.

== Life ==
He was born in Corduba in Hispania, a province of the Roman Empire. Elected to the see of Corduba about 295, he narrowly escaped martyrdom during the persecution of Maximian.

In 300 or 301 he attended the provincial Synod of Elvira (his name appearing second in the list of those present), and upheld its severe canons concerning such points of discipline as questions concerning clerical marriage, and the treatment of those who had abjured their faith during the recent persecutions. The Council appears to have had Novatianist tendencies and held a strict view that refused readmission to those baptized Christians who had denied their faith or performed the formalities of a ritual sacrifice to the pagan gods under pressures of persecution.

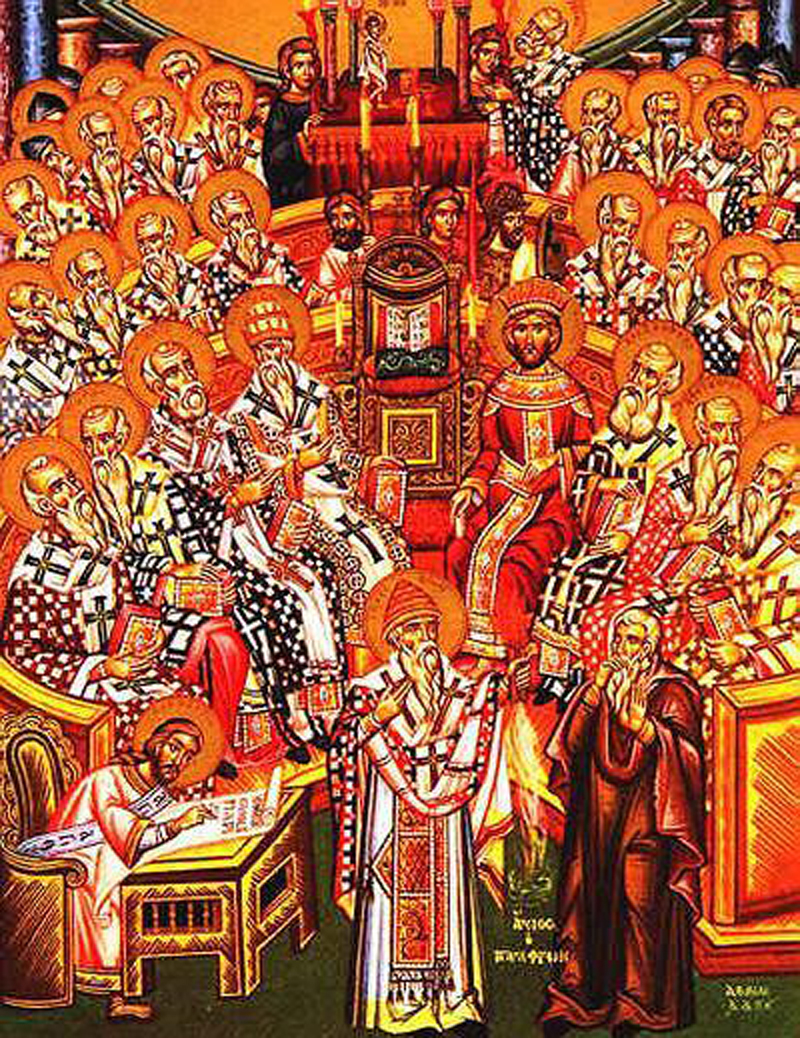
Eastern Orthodox icon depicting the First Council of Nicaea

In 313 he appeared at the court of Constantine the Great, being mentioned by name in a constitution directed by the emperor to Caecilianus of Carthage in that year.

Hosius is not listed among the attendees of the Synod of Arles of 314, but may have been in attendance upon the emperor, who was engaged in his first war with Licinius in Pannonia. As early as 320 or 321 Alexander, Bishop of Alexandria, convoked a council at Alexandria at which more than one hundred bishops from Egypt and Libya anathematized Arius, his deacon. In autumn 324 Hosius was the bearer of Constantine's letter to Bishop Alexander and Arius, in which he urged them to reconcile. After the Synod in Alexandria, Hosius led another synod in Antioch probably on the occasion of the election of Eustathius, after the death of Philogonius on November 324. In this synod, bishops supporting Arius were suspended and a general synod was announced which would be held in Ancyra. Emperor Constantine eventually moved the convocation to the First Council of Nicaea which opened on 20 May 325. Hosius probably presided over it, as his name appears first on the list of participants. Hosius ostensibly supported Alexander of Alexandria against Arius. After the council, Hosius returned to his diocese in Spain.

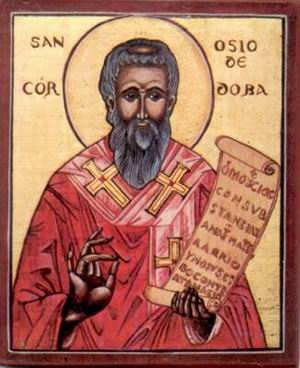
Eastern Orthodox icon of St. Hosius

For nearly 50 years Hosius was one of the foremost bishops of his time. He was held in universal esteem and exercised great influence. After Constantine's death in 337, Eusebius of Nicomedia, an Arian and friend of the Imperial family, was named to the see of Constantinople. In his new role as patriarch, Eusebius and his supporters brought pressure to bear upon Constantius II to expel Athanasius of Alexandria, a staunch anti-Arian, for a second time from his diocese. Eusebius urged the emperor to have Hosius, a supporter of Athanasius, summoned to Milan, where the Bishop of Cordoba declined to condemn Athanasius. Hosius so impressed the emperor that he was authorized to return home.

Hosius had a prominent role to play at the Council of Serdica, which began in the summer, or, at latest, in the autumn of 343, proved by the fact that he was the first to sign the Acts of this council.

Continued pressure from Eusebius led to Constantius' writing a letter demanding whether Hosius alone was going to remain obstinate in his support of Athanasius. In reply, Hosius sent his courageous letter of protest against imperial interference in Church affairs (353), preserved by Athanasius which led to Hosius' exile in 355 to Sirmium, an imperial center in Pannonia (in modern Serbia). From his exile he wrote to Constantius II his only extant composition: "God gives you the empire; He entrusts ecclesiastical power to us". This letter has been "not unjustly characterized" by the French historian Louis-Sébastien Le Nain de Tillemont as displaying gravity, dignity, gentleness, wisdom, generosity and in fact all the qualities of a great soul and a great bishop.

Subjected to continual pressure from the Eusebian party, Hosius signed the homoean formula adopted by the Third Council of Sirmium in 357, which involved communion with the homoeans (Acacians) but not the condemnation of Athanasius. He was then permitted to return to his Hispanic diocese, where he died in 359. Later accounts, such as that of Faustinus and Athanasius, suggesting that Hosius had persecuted Nicene Christians or that he anathemized Arianism on his death bed are most likely fictitious. However, Hosius' lapse is explainable by simply pointing to his frail health and old age without positing that he consciously changed the faith he held for 90 years.

There is a letter from Pope Liberius to him from c. 353 concerning the lapse of Vincentius of Capau at the Council of Arles.
