= Council of Jamnia =

Hypothetical late 1st-century council

Location of Jamnia in contemporary Israel

The Council of Jamnia (the Synode zu Jamnia in German) was the name given by 19th century Jewish exegete Heinrich Graetz to a council he hypothesized had been convened by Pharisees in Jamnia (also called Javneh or Jabneh) in the Palestine region in the late 1st century CE. He proposed that at this Council the third and final phase of the canonization of the Jewish scriptures was completed.

Graetz's theory of a council of Jamnia that finalized the canon first proposed in 1871, was popular for much of the 20th century. It was increasingly questioned from the 1960s onward and has now been largely discredited. The historical debate on the time of finalisation of the Jewish canon is still ongoing.

== Graetz's views on canonization by council ==
Graetz proposed that only authoritative Jewish bodies could have determined the Jewish canon. He identified three times in which such bodies came together to deal with the issue of the canon: the period of Nehemiah or the Great Synagogue around 400 BCE (which fixed the writings on the prophets in the canon), the time of the great revolt by the schools of Shammai and Hillel around 65 CE (which addressed Ecclesiastes) and the time of the dismissal from office of Rabbi Rabban Gamaliel II and the appointment of Eleazar ben Azariah around 90 CE (which settled issues around the inclusion of Ecclesiastes which had not been properly addressed in the second period). He surmised that in the last council held in Jamnia, 72 teachers of the law reviewed the laws and questioned witnesses to determine the canon. According to Graetz, the council concluded by majority vote that Ecclesiastes and the Song of Songs were part of the canon.

Graetz did not engage with other scholars to set out his argument nor did he cite other scholarly authority in support of his theory. It has been suggested that Graetz was inspired to his views on a council of rabbis determining the canon by a passage in Spinoza's Tractatus Theologico-Politicus published in 1670. At the conclusion of chapter 10 of the Tractatus Spinoza suggests that the selection of sacred books was achieved by what he called a "concilium Pharisaeorum" (council of Pharisees).

== Refutation ==
At the end of the 19th century Christian scholars Herbert Edward Ryle and Frants Buhl subscribed to Graetz's thesis on a rabbinic council at Jamnia finalising the Jewish canon after which it gained wider acceptance in the scholarly community.

W. M. Christie was the first to dispute this popular theory in an article entitled "The Jamnia Period in Jewish History". Jack P. Lewis wrote a critique of the popular consensus entitled "What Do We Mean by Jabneh?". Sid Z. Leiman made an independent challenge for his University of Pennsylvania thesis published later as a book in 1976. Raymond E. Brown largely supported Lewis in his review published in The Jerome Biblical Commentary (also appears in the New Jerome Biblical Commentary of 1990), as did Lewis' discussion of the topic in 1992's Anchor Bible Dictionary.

Albert C. Sundberg Jr. summarized the crux of Lewis' argument as follows:

Jewish sources contain echoes of debate about biblical books but canonicity was not the issue and debate was not connected with Jabneh... Moreover, specific canonical discussion at Jabneh is attested only for Chronicles and Song of Songs. Both circulated prior to Jabneh. There was vigorous debate between Beth Shammai and Beth Hillel over Chronicles and Song; Beth Hillel affirmed that both "defile the hands", the rabbinic principle (enunciated in Mishnah Yadayim 3:5) according to which the Holy Scripture is so holy that they impart uncleanness; writings that are not holy, do not impart uncleanness. One text does speak of official action at Jabneh. It gives a blanket statement that "all Holy Scripture defile the hands", and adds "on the day they made R. Eleazar b. Azariah head of the college, the Song of Songs and Koheleth (Ecclesiastes) both render the hands unclean" (M. Yadayim 3.5). Of the apocryphal books, only Ben Sira is mentioned by name in rabbinic sources and it continued to be circulated, copied and cited. No book is ever mentioned in the sources as being excluded from the canon at Jabneh.

According to Lewis:

The concept of the Council of Jamnia is an hypothesis to explain the canonization of the Writings (the third division of the Hebrew Bible) resulting in the closing of the Hebrew canon. ...These ongoing debates suggest the paucity of evidence on which the hypothesis of the Council of Jamnia rests and raise the question whether it has not served its usefulness and should be relegated to the limbo of unestablished hypotheses. It should not be allowed to be considered a consensus established by mere repetition of assertion.

The 20th-century evangelical scholar F. F. Bruce thought that it was "probably unwise to talk as if there were a Council or Synod of Jamnia which laid down the limits of the Old Testament canon." Other scholars have since joined in and today the theory is largely discredited.

== Sources ==
- Kantor, Mattis, The Jewish timeline encyclopaedia: a year-by-year history from Creation to the present day, Jason Aronson Inc., Northvale N.J., 1992
