= Heritage Christian University =

Private bible college in Florence, Alabama

Coordinates: 34.86054°N 87.66272°W

- Former names: Southeastern Institute (College) of the Bible (1968–1971), International Bible College (1971–2001)
- Type: Private bible college
- Established: 1968
- Affiliations: ABHE
- Religious affiliation: Churches of Christ
- Endowment: $15.2M (2021)
- President: Dr. W Kirk Brothers
- Total staff: 17
- Students: 143
- Undergraduates: 82
- Location: Florence, Alabama, United States
- Campus: 57 acres (23 ha)
- Website: www.hcu.edu

Heritage Christian University is a private bible college in Florence, Alabama. It is affiliated with the Churches of Christ. The university is governed by a board of directors, all of whom must be active members of the Churches of Christ.

== Academics ==
Heritage Christian University offers a 128-hour undergraduate program leading to a bachelor's degree in Biblical Studies. All students major in the bible and may choose up to 12 electives or one of two concentrations—Preaching Ministry or Family Life Ministry. HCU also offers an Associate of Arts program. This 66-hour program of study results in the A.A. in Biblical Studies.

Heritage Christian University offers three master's degrees. The Master of Arts (M.A.) prepares students for serious biblical study in Greek or Hebrew. The Master of Ministry (M.Min.) trains students for more effective ministry. The Master of Divinity (M.Div.), the first professional degree in the field of ministry, prepares ministers for comprehensive service for churches. In particular, in cooperation with the Ezell Institute for Biblical Research, students completing the M.Div. degree will be equipped to work in churches with limited resources. All three degrees aim to prepare workers for more effective service in the kingdom of God.

The MA and the M.Min. are both 36-hour programs, while the Master of Divinity is 75 hours with a required Spiritual Formation program to be completed. Instead of a thesis, M.Min. students participate in a practicum that gives them "experience in a supervised program of the church." On June 27, 2011, Heritage Christian University announced that the school had been approved to offer the Master of Divinity degree. Graduate and undergraduate classes are offered both on-campus and online.

Heritage Christian University is accredited by the Association for Biblical Higher Education. The ABHE is a member of the Council for Higher Education Accreditation (CHEA) and is recognized as a national institutional accrediting agency for Bible colleges and universities.

The Alabama State Department of Education licenses Heritage Christian University as a private university.

The U.S. Office of Education Register lists the university, making Heritage Christian University students eligible for grants and federal loans.

The Alabama State Approving Agency recognizes Heritage Christian University for educational benefits to veterans.

Heritage Christian University meets the U.S. Citizenship and Immigration Services's requirements for eligibility to enroll foreign students.

== Library ==
The Overton Memorial Library serves Heritage Christian University undergraduate and graduate students, as well as faculty and staff. The library was dedicated in November 1986 in honor of Basil and Margie Overton and in memory of their son Timothy, who died in 1974. Library holdings exceed 136,000 physical volumes.

In October 2005, the McMeans Family Reading Area was created in honor of William Delona and Othella Tuten McMeans. The Heritage Marriage and Family Resource Center was created within OML in April 2006 through a grant from the Alabama Marriage and Family Project. In June 2008, the Bagents Family Resource Center was created, honoring the Bagents Family.

The Frederick W. Danker Depositorium is located within the Overton Memorial Library. In April 2010, Frederick Danker informed the staff of the Overton Memorial Library that he would be giving his entire personal library and papers to the library. The process officially began in October 2010 and continued until shortly after Danker's death in February 2012. Housed within the Danker Depositorium are files of research conducted by Danker, personal correspondence, published and unpublished writings by Danker and memorabilia from his home and office.

In March 2019, the library's reference collection was named the Ray and Blanche Horsman Reference Collection in honor of the Horsman's dedication to Christian education and to the Overton Memorial Library.

== Campus ==
The Academic Building was constructed in 1977. This 27,000-square-foot (2,500 m^{2}) building contains administrative and faculty offices, classrooms, auditorium, and a cafeteria.

The Alexander Activities Building was built in 1978 and has a gymnasium for students. The Overton Memorial Library, University Archives and History Room, faculty offices, and a recording studio are also housed here.

The Dr. John Kerr Student Center includes a theater, recreation areas, and a kitchenette.

The Coil Conference Center offers a conference room, two offices, and amenities.

The Jim McCreary Cabin and the Brenda McCreary Cabin each house up to 18 guests in a bunkhouse arrangement.

Smith Park is an area for picnics, devotionals, and has a playground for children. The Ezell Pavilion is in Smith Park.

The Ralph C. Bishop Soccer Field and Edith M. Rinks "Meme" Nature Trail offer opportunities for recreational activities for students, faculty, staff, and the general public.

== Student housing ==
Kerr Hall is a student apartment complex that can house up to thirty-two students in eight apartments. Each apartment features a common living room and eat-in kitchen, washer and dryer, four bedrooms, and two full baths.

Married Student Apartments offer housing to families in a two-story triplex near the front entrance to campus.

== Spiritual Formation ==
Spiritual formation plays an important role on the campus of Heritage Christian University.

Chapel is held from 11:00 to 11:30 am Tuesday through Thursday.

The Field Education Program offers extensive supervised experience in ministry and missions settings combined with academic resources and personal reflection. To graduate with an associate's or bachelor's degree, a student must complete the Field Education requirements, consisting of Field Education units and Missions Practicum units.

M.Div. students are prepared to enter a serious engagement with their relationship to God as a primary part of their formation as a leader in a Christian community. Within the first calendar year of enrollment in the M.Div. degree, students are required to attend a retreat and become part of a spiritual formation group. As a part of their development, students participate in M.Div. chapels, journaling, and personal interaction with the Director of the Graduate Program to help them develop as Christian leaders.

== Heritage Christian University Press and Cypress Publications ==
Since 2018, Heritage Christian University Press, under the imprints of HCU Press and Cypress Publications, has published the following to date:

· Danker, Frederick W. Beyond Borders with Saint Luke (2018).

· Bagents, Bill. Always Near Listening for Lessons from God (2019).

· Gallagher, Ed. ed. Visions of Grace: Stories from Scripture. Berean Study Series (2019).

· Bagents, Bill and Cory Collins. Equipping the Saints: A Practical Study of Ephesians 4:11-16. Revised ed. (2019).

· Young, John. Visions of Restoration: The History of Churches of Christ (2019).

· Gallagher, Ed. The Book of Exodus: Explorations in Christian Theology. Cypress Bible Study Series (2020).

· Gallagher, Ed. ed, Cloud of Witnesses: Ancient Stories of Faith. Berean Study Series (2020).

· Wilhelm, Jack P. and Bill Bagents. Easing Life’s Hurts. 2nd ed. (2020).

· Roper, Coy. That All May Go Well (2020).

· Gallagher, Ed. The Sermon on the Mount. Cypress Bible Study Series (2021).

· Wilhelm, Jack P. The Holy Spirit: A Bible Study Guide (2021). Ed. by Ted Burleson and Rickey Collum.

· Bagents, Bill. Welcoming God’s Word: Reading with Head and Heart (2021).

· Bagents, Bill. Revisiting Life’s Oases: Soul-Soothing Stories (2021).

· Bookout, Travis. King of Glory: Reflections on the Gospel of John (2021).

· Brothers, W. Kirk. Lead Like the Lord: Lessons in Leadership from Jesus (2021). Initial volume in conjunction with Heritage Christian Leadership Institute.

· Gallagher, Ed. ed, For the Glory of God: Christ and the Church in Ephesians. Berean Study Series (2021).

· Young, John, Redrawing the Blueprints for the Early Church (2021). Note: First hardback with dust jacket.

· Wakefield, John. Spiritually Speaking: Rescues from Sin in the Old Testament (2021). Note: first case laminate publication.

· Bagents, Bill and Rosemary Snodgrass. Counseling for Church Leaders: A Practical Guide. (2021). Second volume in conjunction with Heritage Christian Leadership Institute.

HCU Press also assisted HCU professor C. Wayne Kilpatrick in the creation of his self-published J.R. Bradley: A Forgotten Larimore Boy (2019). This service included hosting a book signing on 10.15.19.

Forthcoming Titles for 2021/2022:

· Bagents, Bill and Laura S. Bagents. Corrupt Communication: Myths that Target Church Leaders. Third collaboration between HCU Press and HCLI.

· Gallagher, Ed. Angels and Demons: Explorations in Christian Doctrine. Cypress Bible Study Series.

Additional Anticipated Titles:

· Berlanga, Ismael, Imperative: Studies from the Book of James.

· Gallagher, Ed. Majesty and Mercy: God Through the Eyes of Isaiah. 2022 Berean Study Series.

== Berean Study Series ==
Since 2015, Heritage Christian University Press has published an annual volume in the Berean Study Series. The Berean Study Series is a 13-lesson resource, consisting of videos and corresponding study guides (available as a pdf file or printed book) for each lesson. Each 25-minute video message can stand on its own or be used as a springboard for class discussion. Lessons are written and presented by Heritage Christian University faculty and staff. Previous volumes include The Ekklesia of Christ: Becoming the People of God (2015; reprint 2019), What Real Christianity Looks Like: A Study of the Parables (2016), Clothed in Christ: A How-To Guide (2017), Instructions for Living: The Ten Commandments (2018), Visions of Grace (2019), Cloud of Witness: Ancient Stories of Faith (2020), For the Glory of God: Christ and the Church in Ephesians (2021).

== Founders Award ==
The Heritage Christian University Founders Award was inaugurated in 2018 during the celebration of the university's fiftieth anniversary. Each year, ten honorees are selected for special recognition for their service to the church and community. Past recipients include 2018 honorees Russ Blackwell, Dale Boren, Maureen Cagle, Debbie Dupuy, Glenn Dupuy, Oscar Easley (posthumously), James Gray, Patsy Hubbard, Lisa Minor, and Denise Willingham. 2019 recipients were Alvin Alston, Anna Gunderman (posthumously), Larry Kilpatrick, John Lawson, Linda Lumpkins, Marsha Oakley, Charles Payne (posthumously), Donna Payne, Coy Roper, and Cynthia Tillery. The 2020 recipients were Faye Chastain, Robert Coats, Johnnie Lou Cochran, Larry Gunderman, Matt Heupel, Thomas Holiday, Robert Huffaker, Dr. John Kerr, Sonny Owens, and Cathy Turner. In 2021, recipients were Teddy Copeland, Arvy Dupuy, Betty Flanagan, Jesus Gallardo, Betty Hamblen, Joel Kendrick, Kathy Lawson, Larry Taylor, Jr., Richard Taylor, and Don Williams.

== See also ==
- Churches of Christ
