= Walter Bauer =

German theologian (1877–1960)

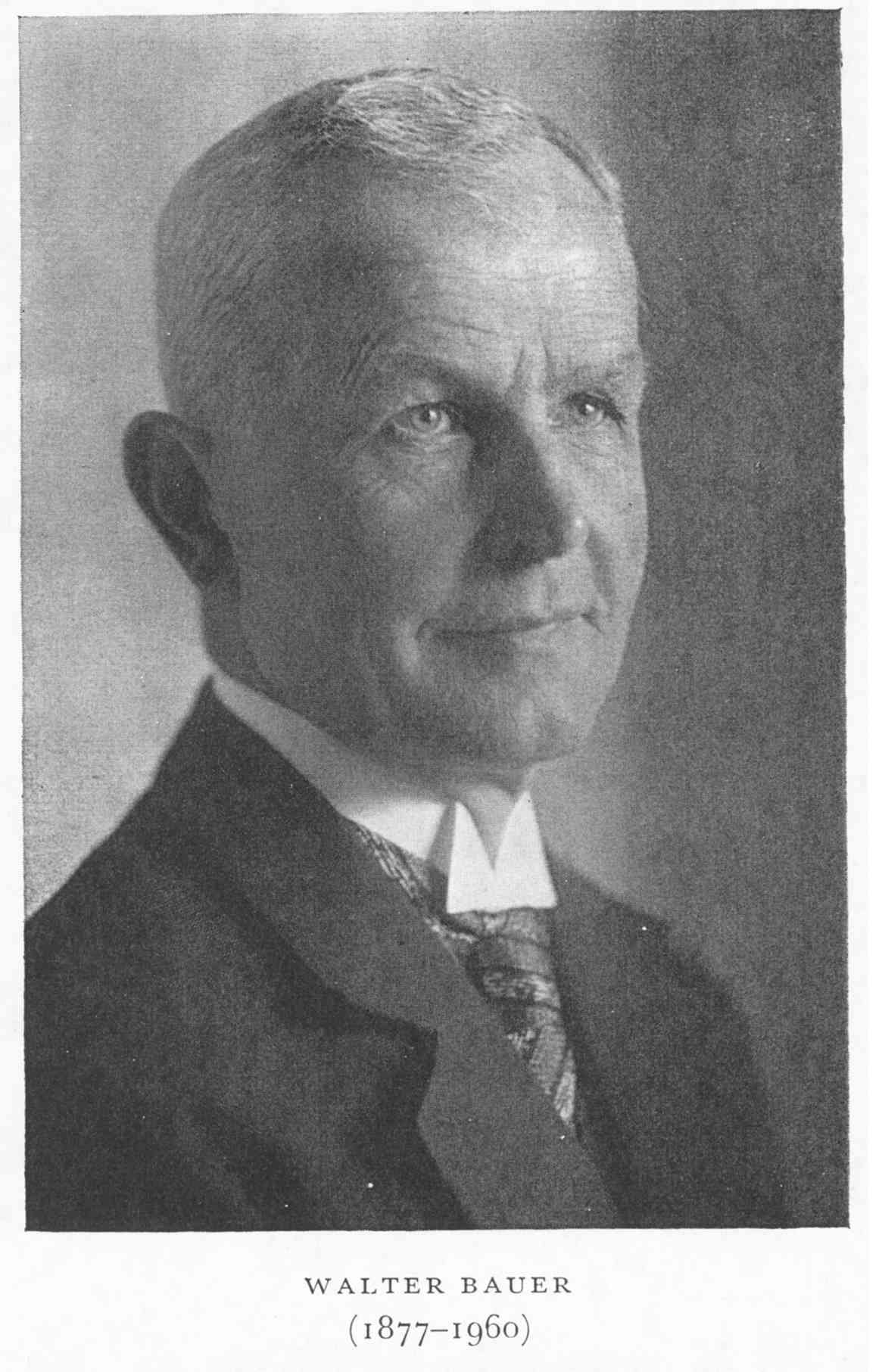
Walter Bauer

Walter Bauer (German: [ˈval.tɐ ˈbaʊɐ]; 8 August 1877 – 17 November 1960) was a German theologian, lexicographer of New Testament Greek, and scholar of the development of Early Christianity.

== Life ==
Bauer was born in Königsberg, East Prussia, and raised in Marburg, where his father was a professor. He studied theology at the universities of Marburg, Strassburg, and Berlin. Bauer taught at Breslau and Göttingen, where he died.

== Work ==
Bauer's most famous and influential work is his 1934 book Rechtgläubigkeit und Ketzerei im ältesten Christentum (Tübingen; a second edition in 1964, edited by Georg Strecker, was translated as Orthodoxy and Heresy in Earliest Christianity in a 1971 English edition). In it, Bauer developed his thesis that in earliest Christianity, orthodoxy and heresy do not stand in relation to one another as primary to secondary. In many regions, beliefs that would be considered "heresy" centuries later were the original and accepted form of Christianity. Bauer pushed against the overwhelmingly dominant view that for the period of Christian origins, ecclesiastical doctrine already represented what is primary, while heresies, on the other hand somehow are a deviation from the genuine. This was the view from the major Church historians of the era such as Eusebius, whose book Church History portrayed orthodox Christianity as descending from Jesus's clear teachings, and heresies as unusual offshoots by people who are evil, misled by the devil, and so on.

Through studies of historical records, Bauer concluded that what came to be known as orthodoxy was just one of numerous forms of Christianity in the early centuries. It was the eventual form of Christianity practiced in the 4th century that influenced the development of orthodoxy and acquired the majority of converts over time. This was largely due to the conversion to Christianity of the Roman Emperor Constantine I and consequently the greater resources available to the Christians in the eastern Roman empire capital he established (Constantinople). Practitioners of what became orthodoxy then rewrote the history of the conflict making it appear that this view had always been the majority one. Writings in support of other views were systematically destroyed.

Bauer's conclusions contradicted nearly 1,600 years of writing on church history and thus were met with much skepticism among Christian academics such as Walther Völker.

The cultural isolation of Nazi Germany precluded a wider dissemination of Bauer's ideas until after World War II; in the international field of biblical scholarship, Bauer continued to be known solely as the compiler of the monumental Wörterbuch zu den Schriften des Neuen Testaments (in its English translation A Greek-English Lexicon of the New Testament and Other Early Christian Literature or the Bauer Lexicon), which has become standard. Rechtgläubigkeit und Ketzerei was finally translated into English in 1970 and published in 1971. Since its English translation in 1971, Bauer's thesis has exerted considerable influence on the study of early Christianity, particularly by drawing attention to the question of diversity of early Christian beliefs and communities. However, its specific historical reconstructions and conclusions have remained subjects of scholarly debate. Subsequent scholars have both developed and challenged aspects of Bauer's argument. I. Howard Marshall, for example, argued that Bauer's thesis could not be readily applied to first-century Christianity, where the New Testament itself attests to disputes over doctrine and the identification of false teaching. Other scholars have questioned Bauer's geographical reconstructions and his interpretation of the historical evidence. The discovery of the Nag Hammadi library in 1945 added a substantial body of primary sources to this debate. While some scholars have regarded these texts as supporting Bauer's account of early Christian diversity and the presence of movements later designated as heretical, others have questioned what they establish about the chronology, geographical prevalence, and historical standing of those movements.

== Reception ==
Bauer's translator, Robert A. Kraft, praised his sophisticated, nuanced writing style, which:

[...] presents a complex and frustrating problem for the translator who hopes to capture something of the "tone" or "flavor" of the original as well as representing accurately its content. Bauer writes in a dynamic and highly sophisticated manner, mixing precision with irony and even insinuation, pictorial language with careful presentation of the historical evidence, hypotheses and caveats with the subtle use of overstatement and understatement in cleverly nuanced expressions. His German is literary but not necessarily formal. Long sentences with closely interrelated parts appear alongside brief, sometimes cryptic or oblique comments couched in clever, often scholarly German idiom. Frequently the presentation flows along rapidly in an exciting manner, despite the difficulties of the subject matter— but its flow is such that the motion is difficult to capture in translation, and is sometimes even difficult to follow in the original.

An early critic of the Bauer thesis, Anglican theologian H. E. W. Turner in his Bampton Lectures, delivered at Oxford in 1954, said of Bauer, "His fatal weakness appears to be a persistent tendency to over-simplify problems, combined with the ruthless treatment of such evidence as fails to support his case. [...] Perhaps the root difficulty is that Bauer fails to attain an adequate view of the nature of orthodoxy. [...] For the nature of orthodoxy is richer and more varied than Bauer himself allows."

== See also ==
- Christian heresy
- F. Wilbur Gingrich
- Bauer's Lexicon
- Proto-orthodox Christianity
