= Bibliotheca (Photius) =

9th-century work of Byzantine Patriarch Photius

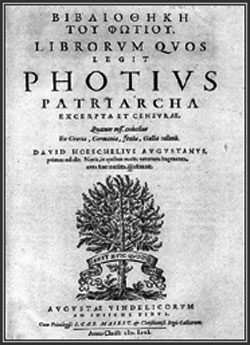
Cover of Bibliotheca

The Bibliotheca (Greek: Βιβλιοθήκη) or Myriobiblos (Μυριόβιβλος, "Ten Thousand Books") was a ninth-century work of Byzantine Patriarch of Constantinople Photius, dedicated to his brother and composed of 279 reviews of books which he had read.

== Overview ==
Bibliotheca was not meant to be a reference work, but was widely used as such in the 9th century, and is one of the first Byzantine works that could be called an encyclopedia. Reynolds and Wilson call it "a fascinating production, in which Photius shows himself the inventor of the book-review," and say its "280 sections... vary in length from a single sentence to several pages". The works he notes are mainly Christian and pagan authors from the 5th century BC to his own time in the 9th century AD. Almost half the books mentioned no longer survive. These would have disappeared in the Sack of Constantinople by the Fourth Crusade in 1204, in the final Fall of Constantinople to the Ottomans in 1453, or in the following centuries of Ottoman rule, during which wealth and literacy contracted dramatically in the subordinate Greek community.

== Possible Abbasid link ==
Some older scholarship had speculated that Bibliotheca might have been composed in Baghdad at the time of Photius' embassy to the Abbasid court, since many of the mentioned works are rarely cited during the period before Photius, i.e. the so-called Byzantine "Dark Ages" (c. 630–800), and since it was known that the Abbasids were interested in translating Greek science and philosophy. However, modern specialists of the period, such as Paul Lemerle, have pointed out that this cannot be the case, since Photius himself clearly states in his preface and postscript to the Bibliotheca that after he was chosen to take part in the embassy, he sent his brother a summary of the works he had read previously "since the time that I learned how to understand and evaluate literature," i.e. from his youth. A further difficulty with supposing that Bibliotheca was composed during rather than before the embassy, besides Photius' own explicit statement, is that the majority of the works in Bibliotheca are of Christian patristic theology, and most of the secular works are histories, grammars, and works of literature, particularly rhetoric, rather than works of philosophy or science, and the Abbasids showed no interest in having Greek history or Greek high literature like rhetoric translated, nor were they interested in translating Greek Christian works. Their interest in Greek texts was confined almost exclusively to science, philosophy and medicine. In fact, "there is almost no overlap (other than some Galen, Dioscorides, and Vindonius Anatolius) between the inventory of secular works in Photius's Bibliotheca and those works that were translated into Arabic" in the Abbasid period.

== Editions ==
- Editio princeps (in Greek): David Hoeschel, Augsburg, 1601. Modern critical edition by R. Henry.
- Wilson, Nigel Guy (2002). The Bibliotheca: a selection. Duckworth. ISBN 978-0-7156-2612-2.

== Contents ==
Source: Treadgold, Warren T. (1980). The Nature of the Bibliotheca of Photius. Dumbarton Oaks. pp. 117–168. ISBN 978-0-88402-090-5.

N°	Author	Title	Religion	Cons.	CPG
1	Theodore of Mopsuestia	That the Book of St. Dionysius is Genuine	Christian	Lost	
2	Hadrian the monk	Introduction to the Scriptures	Christian	Extant	6527
3	Nonnosus	History	Christian	Lost	
4	Theodore of Mopsuestia	For Basil Against Eunomius	Christian	Lost	3859
5	Sophronius	For Basil Against Eunomius	Christian	Lost	
6-7	Gregory of Nyssa	For Basil Against Eunomius	Christian	Extant	3135
8	Origen	De Principiis	Christian	Extant	1482
9	Eusebius	Praeparatio Evangelica	Christian	Extant	3486
10	Eusebius	Demonstratio Evangelica	Christian	Extant	3487
11	Eusebius	Praeparatio Ecclesiastica	Christian	Lost	
12	Eusebius	Demonstratio Ecclesiastica	Christian	Lost	
14	Apollinarius	Against the Pagans	Christian	Lost	
14	Apollinarius	On Piety	Christian	Lost	
14	Apollinarius	On Truth	Christian	Lost	
15	Gelasius of Cyzicus	Ecclesiastical History	Christian	Extant	6034
16	Various	Acts of the Third Council	Christian	Lost	
17	Various	Acts of the Fourth Council	Christian	Lost	
18	Various	Acts of the Fifth Council	Christian	Lost	
19	Various	Acts of the Sixth Council	Christian	Lost	
20	Various	Acts of the Seventh Council	Christian	Lost	
21	John Philoponus	On the Resurrection	Christian	Lost	7272
22	Theodosius the Monk	Against John Philoponus	Christian	Lost	
23	Conon of Tarsus	Against John Philoponus	Christian	Lost	7283
23	Eugenius of Seleucia	Against John Philoponus	Christian	Lost	7283
23	Themistius of Alexandria	Against John Philoponus	Pagan	Lost	7283
24	anonymous	Acts Disputed Before Patriarch John	Christian	Lost	
25	Proclus of Constantinople	On Death	Christian	Lost	
25	Proclus of Constantinople	On the Ascension	Christian	Extant	4531-5
25	Proclus of Constantinople	On Pentecost	Christian	Extant	4536-8
26	Synesius of Cyrene	On Providence	Christian	Extant	5631
26	Synesius of Cyrene	On Royalty	Christian	Extant	5630
26	Synesius of Cyrene	Letters	Christian	Extant	5640
27	Eusebius	Ecclesiastical History	Christian	Extant	3495
28	Socrates	Ecclesiastical History	Christian	Extant	6028
29	Evagrius Scholasticus	Ecclesiastical History	Christian	Extant	7500
30	Sozomen	Ecclesiastical History	Christian	Extant	6030
31	Theodoret of Cyrrhus	Ecclesiastical History	Christian	Extant	6222
32	Athanasius	Letters	Christian	Extant	2123
33	Justus of Tiberias	Chronicle of the Kings of the Jews	Jewish	Lost	
34	Julius Africanus	History	Christian	Lost	1690
35	Philip of Side	Christian History	Christian	Lost	6026
36	Cosmas Indicopleustes	Christian Topography	Christian	Extant	7468
37	anonymous	On Politics	Christian	Extant	
38	Theodore of Mopsuestia	Interpretation of the Creation	Christian	Lost	3827
39	Eusebius	Against Hierocles	Christian	Extant	3485
40	Philostorgius	Ecclesiastical History	Christian	Lost	6032
41	John of Aegeae	Ecclesiastical History	Christian	Lost	7509
42	Basil of Cilicia	Ecclesiastical History	Christian	Lost	
43	John Philoponus	On the Hexaemeron	Christian	Extant	7265
44	Philostratus of Tyre	Life of Apollonius of Tyana	Pagan	Extant	
45	Andronicianus	Against the Eunomians	Christian	Lost	
46	Theodoret of Cyrrhus	Against Various Theses	Christian	Extant	6215, 6219
46	Eutherios of Tyana	Confutationes	Christian	Extant	6147
46	Theodoret of Cyrrhus	Eranistes seu Polymorphus	Christian	Extant	6217
47	Flavius Josephus	The Jewish War	Jewish	Extant	
48	Hippolytus of Rome	On the Universe	Christian	Extant	1898
49	Cyril of Alexandria	Against the Blasphemies of Nestorius	Christian	Extant	5217
49	Cyril of Alexandria	Dialogues on the Trinity	Christian	Extant	5216
49	Cyril of Alexandria	On Adoration and Worship in Spirit and in Truth	Christian	Extant	5200
50	Nicias the Monk	Against the Seven Chapters of Philoponus	Christian	Lost	
50	Nicias the Monk	Against the Impious Severus	Christian	Lost	
50	Nicias the Monk	Against the Pagans	Christian	Lost	
51	Hesychius of Constantinople	On the Brazen Serpent	Christian	Lost	
52	Various	Collection of Acts Against the Messalians	Christian	Lost	
53	Various	Collection of Acts Against Pelagius and Celestius	Christian	Lost	
54	Various	Collection of Acts Against Nestorius	Christian	Lost	
55	John Philoponus	Against the Council of Chalcedon	Christian	Lost	7271
55	John of Aegeae	Against the Council of Chalcedon	Christian	Lost	
56	Theodoret of Cyrrhus	Against Heresies	Christian	Extant	6223
57	Appian	Roman History	Pagan	Extant	
58	Arrian	Parthica	Pagan	Lost	
59	Various	Acts of the Synod of the Oak	Christian	Lost	
60	Herodotus	History	Pagan	Extant	
61	Aeschines	Orations	Pagan	Extant	
62	Praxagoras of Athens	History of Constantine	Pagan	Lost	
63	Procopius of Caesarea	History of the Wars	Christian	Extant	
64	Theophanes of Byzantium	History	Christian	Lost	
65	Theophylact Simocatta	Histories	Christian	Extant	
66	Nicephorus	Breviarium	Christian	Lost	
67	Sergius the Confessor	Ecclesiastical History	Christian	Lost	
68	Cephalion	Muses	Pagan	Lost	
69	Hesychius of Miletus	Roman and General History	Christian	Lost	
69	Hesychius of Miletus	History of Justin and Justinian	Christian	Lost	
70	Diodorus Siculus	Library of History	Pagan	Extant	
71	Cassius Dio	Roman History	Pagan	Extant	
72	Ctesias	Persica	Pagan	Lost	
72	Ctesias	Indica	Pagan	Lost	
73	Heliodorus	Aethiopica	Pagan	Extant	
74	Themistius	Political Orations	Pagan	Extant	
74	Lesbonax	Political Orations	Pagan	Extant	
75	John Philoponus	Against John Scholasticus	Christian	Lost	7268
76	Flavius Josephus	Antiquities of the Jews	Jewish	Extant	
76	Flavius Josephus	Autobiography	Jewish	Extant	
77	Eunapius	Chronicle	Pagan	Lost	
78	Malchus	Byzantine History	Pagan	Lost	
79	Candidus	History	Christian	Lost	
80	Olympiodorus	History	Pagan	Lost	
81	Theodore of Mopsuestia	On Persian Magic	Christian	Lost	3861
82	Dexippus	After Alexander	Pagan	Lost	
82	Dexippus	Short History	Pagan	Lost	
82	Dexippus	Scythica	Pagan	Lost	
83	Dionysius of Halicarnassus	Roman Antiquities	Pagan	Extant	
84	Dionysius of Halicarnassus	Synopsis	Pagan	Extant	
85	Heraclian of Chalcedon	Against the Manichaeans	Christian	Lost	6801
86	John Chrysostom	Letters	Christian	Extant	4402-3. 4405
87	Achilles Tatius	Leucippe and Clitophon	Pagan	Extant	
88	Gelasius of Cyzicus	Ecclesiastical History	Christian	Extant	6034
89	Gelasius of Caesarea	Continuation of the Ecclesiastical History of Eusebius	Christian	Lost	3521
90	Libanius	Orations	Pagan	Extant	
91	Arrian	The Anabasis of Alexander	Pagan	Extant	
91	Arrian	Indica	Pagan	Extant	
92	Arrian	After Alexander	Pagan	Lost	
93	Arrian	Bithynica	Pagan	Lost	
94	Iamblichus	Babyloniaca	Pagan	Lost	
95	John Scythopolita	Against Those Separated from the Church	Christian	Lost	
96	George of Alexandria	On Chrysostom	Christian	Extant	7979
97	Phlegon of Tralles	Compilation of Olympic Victors and Chronicles	Pagan	Lost	
98	Zosimus	New History	Pagan	Extant	
99	Herodian	History	Pagan	Extant	
100	The Emperor Hadrian	Rhetorical Exercises	Pagan	Lost	
101	Victorinus of Antioch	Orations	Christian	Lost	
102	Gelasius of Caesarea	Against the Anomoeans	Christian	Lost	3520
103	Philo Judaeus	Legum Allegoriae	Jewish	Extant	
103	Philo Judaeus	De Josepho	Jewish	Extant	
104	Philo Judaeus	De Judaeis	Jewish	Lost	
104	Philo Judaeus	De Vita Contemplativa	Jewish	Extant	
105	Philo Judaeus	Against Flaccus	Jewish	Extant	
105	Philo Judaeus	Against Gaius	Jewish	Extant	
106	Theognostus of Alexandria	Hypotyposes	Christian	Lost	1626
107	Basil of Cilicia	Against John Scythopolita	Christian	Lost	
108	Theodore of Alexandria	Against Themistius	Christian	Lost	7295
109	Clement of Alexandria	Hypotyposes	Christian	Lost	1380
110	Clement of Alexandria	Paedagogus	Christian	Extant	1376
110	Clement of Alexandria	Protrepticus	Christian	Extant	1375
111	Clement of Alexandria	Stromata	Christian	Extant	1377
111	Clement of Alexandria	Quis Dives Salvetur?	Christian	Extant	1379
112-3	Clement of Rome	Apostolic Constitutions and Recognitions	Christian	Extant	1730
114	Leucius Charinus	Acts of St. Peter	Christian	Extant	
114	Leucius Charinus	Acts of St. John	Christian	Extant	
114	Leucius Charinus	Acts of St. Andrew	Christian	Extant	
114	Leucius Charinus	Acts of St. Thomas	Christian	Extant	
114	Leucius Charinus	Acts of St. Paul	Christian	Extant	
115	anonymous	Against the Quartodecimans	Christian	Lost	
115	Metrodorus	Computation of Easter	Christian	Lost	
116	anonymous	On Easter	Christian	Lost	
117	anonymous	For Origen	Christian	Lost	
118	Pamphilus of Caesarea	For Origen	Christian	Extant	1715
118	Eusebius	For Origen	Christian	Lost	3476
119	Pierius	Sermons	Christian	Lost	
120	Irenaeus	Against Heresies	Christian	Extant	1306
121	Hippolytus of Rome	Against Heresies	Christian	Extant	1897
122	Epiphanius	Panarion	Christian	Extant	3745
123	Epiphanius	Ancoratus	Christian	Extant	3744
124	Epiphanius	On Weights and Measures	Christian	Extant	3746
125	Justin Martyr	Apology	Christian	Extant	1073
125	Justin Martyr	Dialogue with Trypho	Christian	Extant	1076, 1084
126	Clement of Rome	Letters to the Corinthians	Christian	Extant	1001, 1003
126	Polycarp	Letter to the Philippians	Christian	Extant	1040
127	Eusebius	Life of Constantine	Christian	Extant	3496
128	Lucian	Dialogues	Pagan	Extant	
129	Lucius of Patrae	Metamorphoses	Pagan	Lost	
130	Damascius	On Marvelous Deeds	Pagan	Lost	
130	Damascius	Marvelous Tales of the Gods	Pagan	Lost	
130	Damascius	Marvelous Tales of Souls Appearing After Death	Pagan	Lost	
130	Damascius	Marvelous Animals	Pagan	Lost	
131	Amyntianus	On Alexander	Pagan	Lost	
132	Palladius of Methone	Rhetorical Exercises	Pagan	Lost	
133	Aphthonius of Antioch	Rhetorical Exercises	Pagan	Lost	
134	Eusebius of Emesa	Rhetorical Exercises	Christian	Lost	
135	Maximus	Rhetorical Exercises	Christian	Lost	
136	Cyril of Alexandria	Thesaurus	Christian	Extant	5215
137	Eunomius of Cyzicus	Apologeticus	Christian	Extant	3455
138	Eunomius of Cyzicus	Apologia Pro Apologia	Christian	Lost	3456
138	Eunomius of Cyzicus	Letters	Christian	Lost	3456
139	Athanasius	Commentary on Ecclesiastes	Christian	Lost	2141
139	Athanasius	Commentary on the Song of Songs	Christian	Lost	2141
140	Athanasius	Orations Against the Arians	Christian	Extant	2093
141	Basil of Caesarea	On the Hexameron	Christian	Extant	2835
142	Basil of Caesarea	Moralia	Christian	Extant	2877
143	Basil of Caesarea	Letters	Christian	Extant	2900
144	Basil of Caesarea	Ascetica	Christian	Extant	2876 or 2875
145-8	Helladius	Usage of All Sorts of Style	Pagan	Lost	
149	Valerius Pollio	Lexicon	Pagan	Lost	
149	Diogenianus of Heraclea	Lexicon	Pagan	Lost	
150	Julian	Lexicon of Words in the Ten Orators	Pagan	Lost	
150	Philostratus	Questions in the Orators	Pagan	Lost	
150	Valerius Diodorus	Explanation of Questions in the Ten Orators	Pagan	Lost	
151	Timaeus	On Terms in Plato	Pagan	Extant	
152	Aelius Dionysius	Attic Words	Pagan	Lost	
153	Pausanias	Lexicon	Pagan	Lost	
154	Boethus	Collection of Platonic Terms	Pagan	Lost	
155	Boethus	On Difficult Words in Plato	Pagan	Lost	
156	Dorotheus of Ascalon	On Foreign Words	Pagan	Lost	
157	Aelius Moeris	Atticist	Pagan	Extant	
158	Phrynichus the Arabian	Sophistic Preparations	Pagan	Lost	
159	Isocrates	Orations	Pagan	Extant	
159	Isocrates	Letters	Pagan	Extant	
160	Choricius of Gaza	Orations	Christian	Extant	7518
161	Sopater of Apamea	Various Extracts	Pagan	Lost	
162	Eusebius of Thessalonica	Against Andrew	Christian	Lost	
163	Vindonius Anatolius	A Collection of Agricultural Precepts	Pagan	Lost	
164	Galen	On Medical Schools	Pagan	Extant	
165	Himerius	Orations	Pagan	Extant	
166	Antonius Diogenes	The Wonders Beyond Thule	Pagan	Lost	2877
167	Joannes Stobaeus	Anthology	Pagan	Extant	2900
168	Basil of Seleucia	Sermons	Christian	Extant	6656
169	Cyril of Alexandria	Against the Blasphemies of Nestorius	Christian	Extant	5217
169	Cyril of Alexandria	Letters	Christian	Extant	5304, 5669, 5317, 5301-5411
169	Cyril of Alexandria	Scholia on the Incarnation of the Only-Begotten	Christian	Extant	5225
170	anonymous	Testimonies and Citations	Christian	Lost	
171	Eustratios of Constantinople	Refutation	Christian	Extant	7522
172-4	John Chrysostom	Sermons	Christian	Extant	4409, 4426, 4427-40, 4413
175	Pamphile of Epidaurus	Miscellaneous Historical Notes	Pagan	Lost	
176	Theopompus	Philippica	Pagan	Lost	
177	Theodore of Mopsuestia	Against the Defenders of Original Sin	Christian	Lost	3860
178	Dioscorides	Materia Medica	Pagan	Extant	
178	Dioscorides	On Harmful Medicines	Pagan	Extant	
178	Dioscorides	On Venomous Animals	Pagan	Extant	
179	Agapius	Manichaean pamphlets	Manichaean	Lost	
180	John the Lydian	On Prodigies	Christian	Extant	
180	John the Lydian	On the Months	Christian	Extant	
180	John the Lydian	On the Public Magistracies	Christian	Extant	
181	Damascius	Life of Isidore	Pagan	Lost	
182	Eulogius of Alexandria	On Dispensation	Christian	Lost	6976
182	Eulogius of Alexandria	Against Novatus	Christian	Lost	6976
183	Eudocia Augusta	Paraphrase of the Octateuch	Christian	Lost	6022
184	Eudocia Augusta	Paraphrase of Zechariah and Daniel	Christian	Lost	6023
184	Eudocia Augusta	On Cyprian the Martyr	Christian	Lost	6024
185	Dionysius of Aegeae	Dictyaca	Pagan	Lost	
186	Conon	Narrations	Pagan	Lost	
186	Apollodorus	Epitome of Bibliotheca	Pagan	Extant	
187	Nicomachus of Gerasa	Arithmetical Theology	Pagan	Lost	
188	Alexander of Myndus	Collection of Wonders	Pagan	Lost	
188	Protagoras	Geography of the World	Pagan	Lost	
189	Sotion	Strange Stories	Pagan	Lost	
189	Nicolas of Damascus	Collection of Customs	Jewish	Lost	
189	Acestorides	Myths of the Town	Pagan	Lost	
190	Ptolemaeus Chennus	New History for Erudition	Pagan	Lost	
191	Basil of Caesarea	Ascetica	Christian	Extant	2875
192A	Maximus the Confessor	Questions to Thalassios	Christian	Extant	7688
192B	Maximus the Confessor	Letters	Christian	Extant	7699
193	Maximus the Confessor	Liber Asceticus	Christian	Extant	7692
193	Maximus the Confessor	De Caritate	Christian	Extant	7693
194	Maximus the Confessor	Letters	Christian	Extant	7699, 7700, 7705
194	Maximus the Confessor	Capita Gnostica	Christian	Extant	7694
195	Maximus the Confessor	Letter to Marinus	Christian	Extant	7697
195	Maximus the Confessor	Disputation with Pyrrhus	Christian	Extant	7698
196	Ephrem of Nisibis	Sermons	Christian	Extant	3905, 3906, 3933, 3936, 3942
197	John Cassian	Institutes	Christian	Extant	
197	John Cassian	Epitome of Conferences	Christian	Extant	
198	anonymous	Apophthegmata Patrum	Christian	Extant	5560-74
199	John Moschos	Spiritual Meadow	Christian	Extant	7376
200	Mark the Monk	On the Spiritual Law	Christian	Extant	6090
200	Mark the Monk	Against the Melchisidecians	Christian	Extant	6100
201	Diadochus of Photicia	Capita Gnostica	Christian	Extant	6106
201	Evagrius Ponticus	On Prayer	Christian	Extant	2452
201	John of Karpathos	Exhortation to the Monks Returned from India	Christian	Extant	7855
202	Hippolytus of Rome	Commentary on Daniel	Christian	Extant	1872
202	Hippolytus of Rome	On Antichrist	Christian	Extant	1873
203	Theodoret of Cyrrhus	Commentary on Daniel	Christian	Extant	6027
204	Theodoret of Cyrrhus	Questions on the Octateuch	Christian	Extant	6200
204	Theodoret of Cyrrhus	Questions on Kings and Chronicles	Christian	Extant	6201
205	Theodoret of Cyrrhus	Commentaries on the Twelve Prophets	Christian	Extant	6208
206	Procopius of Gaza	On the Octateuch	Christian	Extant	7430
206	Procopius of Gaza	On Kings	Christian	Extant	7430
206	Procopius of Gaza	On Chronicles	Christian	Extant	7430
207	Procopius of Gaza	On Isaiah	Christian	Extant	7434
208	Eulogius of Alexandria	Against Novatus	Christian	Lost	6976
209	Dion of Prusa	Orations	Pagan	Extant	
210	Caesarius of Nazianzen	Dialogues	Christian	Extant	7482
211	Dionysius of Aegeae	Dictyaca	Pagan	Lost	
212	Aenesidemus	Pyrrhonian writings	Pagan	Lost	
213	Agatharchides of Cnidus	On the Red Sea	Pagan	Lost	
214	Hierocles	On Providence and Fate	Pagan	Lost	
215	John Philoponos	Against Iamblichus on Statues	Christian	Lost	
216	Oribasius	Excerpts from Galen	Pagan	Lost	
217	Oribasius	Collectiones Medicae	Pagan	Extant	
218	Oribasius	Synopsis ad Eustathium	Pagan	Extant	
219	Oribasius	Ad Eunapium	Pagan	Extant	
219	Oribasius	Euporista	Pagan	Extant	
220	Theon of Alexandria	The Man	Pagan	Lost	
221	Aetius of Amida	Medical Work	Christian	Extant	
222	Job the Monk	On the incarnation	Christian	Lost	6984
223	Diodorus of Tarsus	Against Fate	Christian	Lost	3821
224	Memnon of Heraclea	History of Heraclea	Pagan	Lost	
225-6	Eulogius of Alexandria	Against Theodosius and Severus	Christian	Lost	6976
227	Eulogois of Alexandria	Against the Theodosians and Gaianites	Christian	Lost	6976
228	Ephrem of Amida	Letters	Christian	Lost	6908
228	Ephrem of Amida	Festal Sermons	Christian	Lost	6908
229	Ephrem of Amida	Treatises	Christian	Lost	6908
230	Eulogius of Alexandria	Various treatises	Christian	Lost	6976
231	Sophronius of Jerusalem	Synodal Letter	Christian	Extant	7635
232	Stephen Gobar	Florilegium	Christian	Lost	7300
233	Germanus of Constantinople	On the true and legitimate retribution	Christian	Lost	8022
234	Methodius of Olympus	On the Resurrection	Christian	Extant	1812
235	Methodius of Olympus	On Creatures	Christian	Lost	1817
236	Methodius of Olympus	On Free Will	Christian	Extant	1811
237	Methodius of Olympus	Symposium	Christian	Extant	1810
238	Flavius Josephus	Antiquities of the Jews	Jewish	Extant	
239	Proclus	Manual of Literature	Pagan	Lost	
240	John Philoponus	On the Hexameron	Christian	Extant	7265
241	Philostratus of Tyre	Life of Apollonius of Tyana	Pagan	Extant	
242	Damascius	Life of Isidore	Pagan	Lost	
243	Himerius	Orations	Pagan	Extant	
244	Diodorus Siculus	Library of History	Pagan	Extant	
245	Plutarch of Chaeronea	Parallel Lives	Pagan	Extant	
246	Aelius Aristides	Panathenaicus	Pagan	Extant	
247-8	Aelius Aristides	For Rhetoric against Plato	Pagan	Extant	
249	anonymous	Life of Pythagoras	Pagan	Lost	
250	Agatharchides of Cnidus	On the Red Sea	Pagan	Lost	
251	Hierocles	On Providence and Fate	Pagan	Lost	
252	anonymous	Life of St. Gregory the Great	Christian	Lost	
253	anonymous	Martyrology of the Seven Sleepers of Ephesus	Christian	Extant	
254	anonymous	Martyrology of St. Timothy	Christian	Extant	
255	anonymous	Martyrology of St. Demetrius	Christian	Lost	
256	anonymous	Life of SS. Metrophanes and Alexander	Christian	Extant	
257	anonymous	Life of St. Paul of Constantinople	Christian	Extant	
258	anonymous	Life of St. Athanasius	Christian	Lost	
259	Antiphon	Orations	Pagan	Extant	
260	Isocrates	Orations	Pagan	Extant	
261	Andocidus	Orations	Pagan	Extant	
262	Lysias	Orations	Pagan	Extant	
263	Isaeus	Orations	Pagan	Extant	
264	Aeschines	Orations	Pagan	Extant	
264	Aeschines	Letters	Pagan	Extant	
265	Demosthenes	Orations	Pagan	Extant	
266	Hyperidus	Orations	Pagan	Extant	
267	Dinarchus	Orations	Pagan	Extant	
268	Lycurgus	Orations	Pagan	Extant	
269	Hesychius of Jerusalem	Eulogy of St. Andrew	Christian	Extant	6571
270	John Chrysostom	On St. Paul	Christian	Lost	
271	Asterius of Amaseus	Sermons	Christian	Extant	3260-1
272	Leontius of Arabissos	On the Creation and On Lazarus	Christian	Lost	
273	Theodoret of Cyrrhus	On St. John Chrysostom	Christian	Lost	6225
274	John Chrysostom	On the Forty Holy Martyrs	Christian	Lost	
274	John Chrysostom	On the Beheading of St. John the Baptist	Christian	Lost	
275	Hesychius of Jerusalem	On St. James and David	Christian	Lost	6574
275	Modestus of Jerusalem	Sermons	Christian	Extant	7872, 7876, 7873
276	Nilus of Ancyra	On Easter	Christian	Lost	6078
276	Proclus of Constantinople	On the Ascension	Christian	Extant	6078
277	John Chrysostom	Sermons	Christian	Extant	4429, 4328, 4329, 4333, 4508, 4576, 4701, 4329, 4620
277	Severian of Gabala	Sermons	Christian	Extant	4188, 4204, 4200
278	Theophrastus of Eresos	Extracts of various treatises	Pagan	Lost	
279	Helladius of Antinoöpolis	Chrestomathy	Pagan	Lost	
279	Hermias of Hermopolis	Fatherland of Hermopolis and Other Poems	Pagan	Lost	
279	Aelius Serenus	Plays	Pagan	Lost	
279	Andronicus of Hermopolis	To Count Phoebammon	Pagan	Lost	
279	Horapollo	On Alexandria	Pagan	Lost	
279	Cyrus of Panopolis	To Duke Maurice	Pagan	Lost	
280	Eulogius of Alexandria	On Dispensation	Christian	Lost	6976
280	Eulogius of Alexandria	Against Novatus	Christian	Lost	6976

== See also ==
- Byzantine philosophy
- Greek Orthodox Christianity
- History of the Byzantine Empire
