= Scythopolis (see) =

The Diocese of Scythopolis is a titular see in Israel and Jordan and was the Metropolitan of the Roman province of Palestina II. It was centered on Modern Beth Shean (Bêsân).

== Historical diocese ==
Scythopolis (today's Beit She'an or Bêsân) had a Christian community headed by a bishop even before the Edict of Milan of 313 legalized profession of Christianity in the Roman Empire. When the Roman province of Palaestina Secunda was set up in the 4th century, with Scythopolis as its capital, the bishopric became the metropolitan see of the province. It was one of the Decapolis cities, a group of cities founded by retired veterans of Alexander the Great, in this case probably a Scythian unit.

Under Emperor Diocletian, Saint Procopius of Scythopolis died as a martyr on 7 July 303. In the fourth century the bishopric was strongly Arian. When it became a metropolitan see, it had Pella as one of its suffragans.

Copious archaeological remains were found dating to the Byzantine period (330 CE – 636 CE) and were excavated by the University of Pennsylvania Museum from 1921 to 1923. A rotunda church was constructed on top of the tell and the entire city was enclosed in a wall. Textual sources mention several other churches in the town. Beit She'an was primarily Christian, as attested to by the large number of churches, but evidence of Jewish habitation and a Samaritan synagogue indicate established communities of these minorities. The pagan temple in the city centre was destroyed, but the nymphaeum and Roman baths were restored. Many of the buildings of Scythopolis were damaged in the 363 Galilee earthquake. It became the capital of the new province of Palaestina Secunda established in 390. Dedicatory inscriptions indicate a preference for donations to religious buildings, and many colourful mosaics, such as that featuring the zodiac in the Monastery of Lady Mary, or the one picturing a menorah and shalom in the House of Leontius' Jewish synagogue, were preserved. A Samaritan synagogue's mosaic was unique in abstaining from human or animal images, instead utilising floral and geometrical motifs. Elaborate decorations were also found in the settlement's many luxurious villas, and in the 6th century especially, the city reached its maximum size of 40,000 and spread beyond its period city walls.

The city was taken by Muslim armies in AD 634 and the city was devastated by the Golan earthquake of 749.

The city was taken by the Crusaders. Under their rule, the Latin see was moved to Nazareth, but the Eastern Orthodox Church continued for a long time further to maintain two separate sees.

=== Bishops ===
Bishop Patrophilus of Scythopolis was an intimate friend of Arius, whom he welcomed when exiled to Palestine in 323. A supporter of Arianism, he took part in the First Council of Nicaea (325) and various councils of Arians until 360. Sozomen and Socrates Scholasticus say that in 354-5 he acted together with Acacius of Caesarea (Caesarea was then the metropolitan see for both Scythopolis and Jerusalem) to depose Bishop Maximus of Jerusalem, who supported the Nicene Creed, and to replace him with Cyril of Jerusalem, whom they wrongly thought to be an Arian. He also supervised the exile of Eusebius of Vercelli to Scythopolis – Eusebius calls him his "jailer". In 359 he was a member of a delegation sent to Emperor Constantius II to protest against depositions of Arian clergy by Basil of Caesarea. He was deposed by the Council of Seleucia in 359 and died soon after. Philostorgius mentions that in 361 his body was disinterred and his bones scattered during the pagan reaction under Julian.

Other bishops of Scythopolis include Philip and Athanasius, both Arians; Saturninus, present at the First Council of Constantinople in 381; Theodosius, friend of Saint John Chrysostom; Acacius, friend of Saint Cyril of Alexandria; Severianus, killed by Monophysites in 452; John, who wrote in defence of the Council of Chalcedon; Theodore, who in about 553 was compelled to sign an anti-Origenist profession of faith, still preserved (Le Quien, "Oriens christianus." III, 681–94).

=== List of residential bishops ===
- Procopius of Scythopolis (???-7 July 303AD)
- Patrophilus, fl 323–359. (Arian) at First Council of Nicaea
- Saturninus, fl381.
- Philip (Arian)
- Athanasius, (Arian)
- Saturninus, fl381
- Theodosius, c400
- Acacius, fl420
- Servianus, fl451
- Cyril of Scythopolis (ca. 525–559)
- John of Scythopolis (ca. 536–550),
- Theodore fl 553.

Bishopric moved to Nazareth by crusaders in the 11th century.

=== Other notable Christians of Scythopolis ===
In the 6th century there were four churches at Scythopolis, dedicated to the Apostles St Thomas and John the Evangelist, Saint Procopius and St Basil, another local martyr. Many monks lived in the town and its environs, occupied in making baskets and fans from the palms in the neighbouring forests (Sozomen, "Hist. ecclés.", VIII, 13); with them the four Tall Brothers took refuge when expelled from Egypt by Patriarch Theophilus for so called Origenist ideas.

Furthermore:

- Asterius, 4th-century commentator of the Psalms, cited with praise by Saint Jerome
- Cyril, charming historian of monastic life in Palestine, who wrote seven lives of saints.
- Cyril of Scythopolis (Hagiographer)
- Eusebius of Emesa
- Saint Eusebius, bishop of Vercelli,
- Maximus of Scythopolis
- Sabbas went to Scythopolis

== Titular Metropolitan see ==
Since its nominal restoration in 1621, the Latin Metropolitan (the highest of three ranks) see of Scythopolis is included in the Catholic Church's list of titular sees.

It is currently vacant, having had the following incumbents:

- Giovanni Mozzanigo (22 Oct 1821-c.1895)
- Mariano Gavasci, Capuchin Friars (O.F.M. Cap.) (18 March 1895 – 9 Feb 1899)
- Domenico Fegatelli (17 Dec 1900 – 23 Jan 1905d)
- Antonio Maria Bonito (11 Dec 1905 – 17 June 1908)
- John Lancaster Spalding (14 Oct 1908 – 25 Aug 1916)
- Americo Bevilacqua (2 Feb 1918 – 20 March 1926)
- Pranciškus Karevičius (Karewicz), Marian Fathers (M.I.C.) (23 March 1926 – 30 May 1945)
- Antonio Tani (31 Dec 1952 – 16 Nov 1966)
- Saba Youakim, Salvatorian Fathers (B.S.) (9 Sep 1968 – 15 Oct 1970)
- Eftimios Youakim, (B.S.) † (21 Aug 1971 – 19 May 1972)
- Joseph-Marie Raya (21 Aug 1974 – 10 June 2005)

== Gallery ==
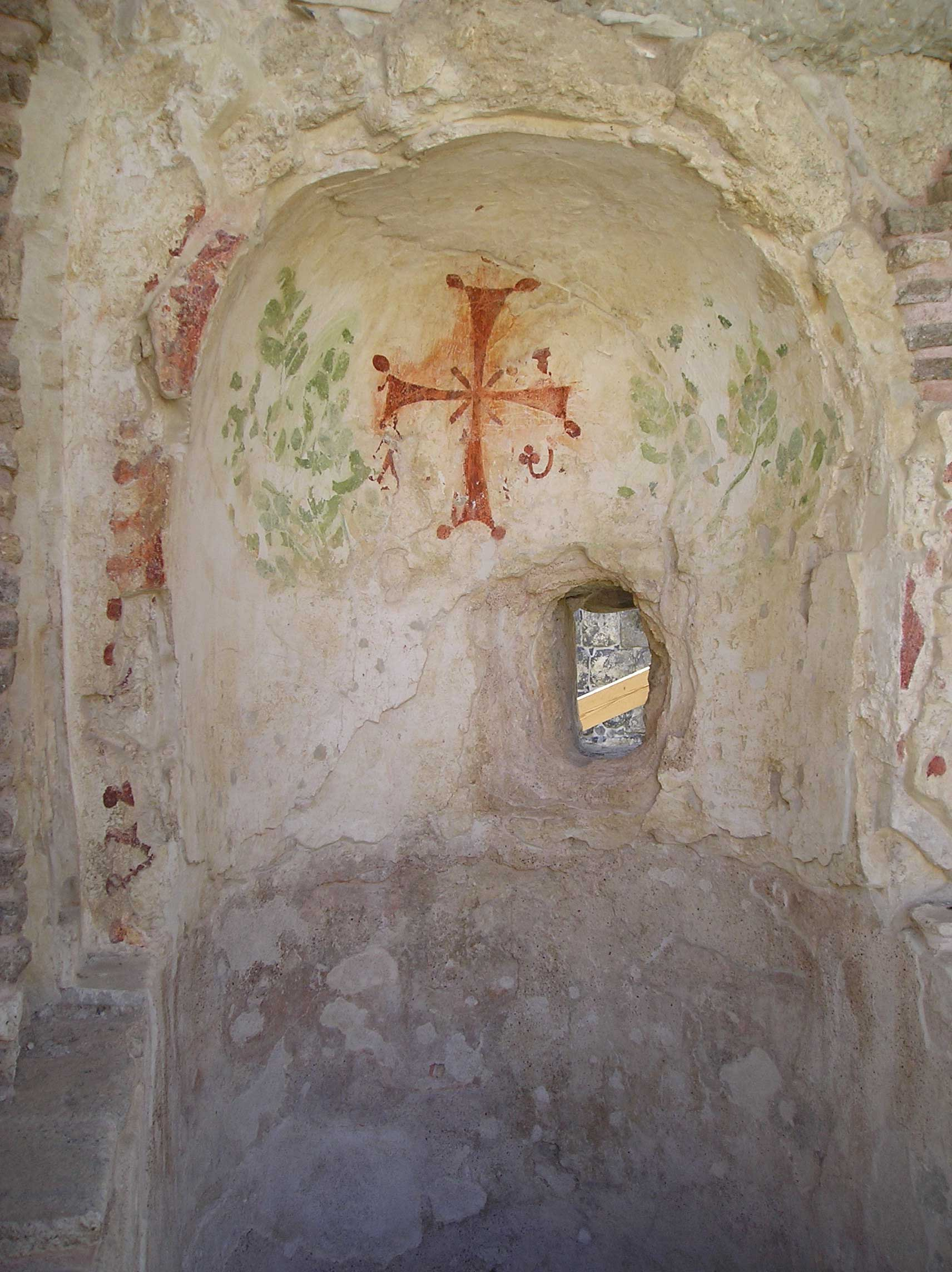
Byzantine baptismal font in Western Bathhouse at BetShe'an.

== See also ==
- Palaestina Secunda
