= Clement of Alexandria =

Christian theologian (c. 150 – c. 215)

Saint Clement of Alexandria
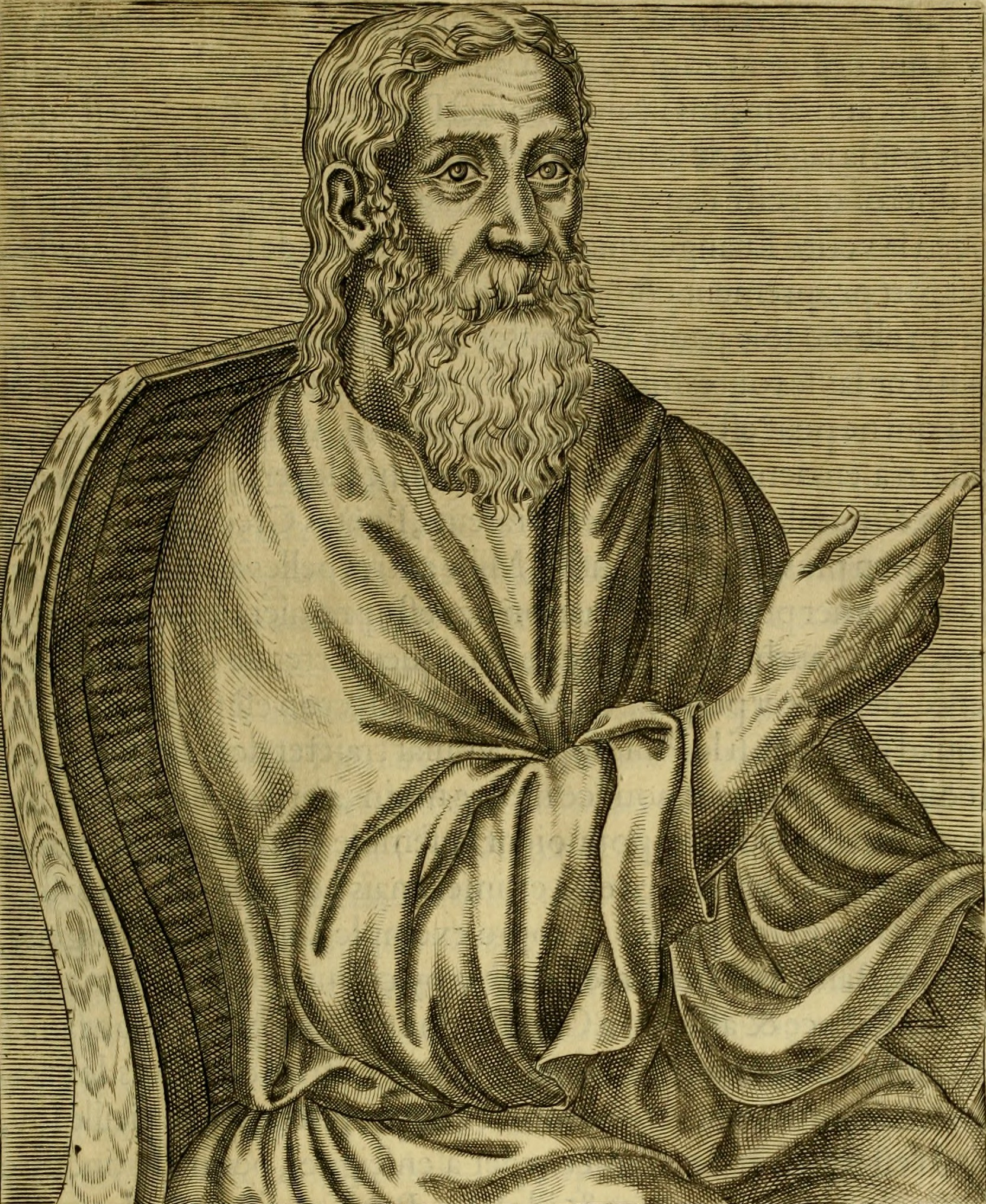
- Clement depicted in 1584

Church Father, Theologian
- Born: Titus Flavius Clemens c. 147 AD; Alexandria or Athens, Roman Empire
- Died: c. 215 AD; Jerusalem, Syria Palaestina, Roman Empire
- Venerated in: Oriental Orthodoxy; Anglican Communion
- Canonized: Pre-congregation
- Feast: 4 December (Eastern Catholicism, Anglicanism); 5 December (Episcopal Church, Anglicanism)
- Controversy: Regarded as a heretic by Photius.
- Catholic cult suppressed: c. 1605 by Pope Clement VIII
- Other name: Clement Alexandrine

Philosophical work
- Era: Ancient philosophy; Patristic Period
- Region: Western philosophy
- School: Middle Platonism; Alexandrian school
- Institutions: Catechetical School of Alexandria
- Notable students: Origen and Alexander
- Main interests: Christian theology
- Notable works: Protrepticus; Paedagogus; Stromata
- Notable ideas: Thrones; Fallen Nephilim; Barnabas authorship; Limbo of the Fathers; Baptism by fire

Titus Flavius Clemens, also known as Clement of Alexandria (Ancient Greek: Κλήμης ὁ Ἀλεξανδρεύς; c. 147 – c. 215 AD), was a Christian theologian and philosopher who taught at the Catechetical School of Alexandria. Among his pupils were Origen and Alexander of Jerusalem. A convert to Christianity, he was an educated man who was familiar with classical Greek philosophy and literature. As his three major works demonstrate, Clement was influenced by Hellenistic philosophy to a greater extent than any other Christian thinker of his time, and in particular, by Plato and the Stoics. His secret works, which exist only in fragments, suggest that he was familiar with pre-Christian Jewish esotericism and Gnosticism as well. In one of his works he argued that Greek philosophy had its origin among non-Greeks, claiming that both Plato and Pythagoras were taught by Egyptian scholars.

Clement is usually regarded as a Church Father. He is venerated as a saint in Coptic Christianity, Eastern Catholicism, Ethiopian Christianity, and Anglicanism. He was revered in Western Catholicism until 1586, when his name was removed from the Roman Martyrology by Pope Sixtus V on the advice of Baronius. The Eastern Orthodox Church officially stopped any veneration of Clement of Alexandria in the 10th century. Nonetheless, he is still sometimes referred to as "Saint Clement of Alexandria" by both Eastern Orthodox and Catholic authors.

== Biography ==
Neither Clement's birthdate or birthplace is certain. It is speculated that he was born sometime around 147 AD. According to Epiphanius of Salamis, he was born in Athens, but there is also a tradition of an Alexandrian birth.

His parents were pagans and Clement was a convert to Christianity. In the Protrepticus he displays an extensive knowledge of Greek religion and mystery religions, which could have arisen only from the practice of his family's religion.

Having rejected paganism as a young man due to its perceived moral corruption, he traveled in Greece, Asia Minor, Palestine, and Egypt. Clement's journeys were primarily a religious undertaking. In Greece, he encountered an Ionian theologian, who has been identified as Athenagoras of Athens; while in the east, he was taught by an Assyrian, sometimes identified with Tatian, and a Jew, possibly Theophilus of Caesarea.

In around 180 AD, Clement reached Alexandria, where he met Pantaenus, who taught at the Catechetical School of Alexandria. Eusebius suggests that Pantaenus was the head of the school, but controversy exists about whether the institutions of the school were formalized in this way before the time of Origen. (Note: Proponents of a formalized leadership and succession suggest that Clement succeeded Pantaenus as leader of the school, and was succeeded himself by Origen.) Clement studied under Pantaenus, and was ordained to the priesthood by Pope Julian before 189. Otherwise, virtually nothing is known of Clement's personal life in Alexandria. He may have been married, a conjecture supported by his writings.

During the Severian persecution of 202–203, Clement left Alexandria. In 211, Alexander of Jerusalem wrote a letter commending him to the Church of Antioch, which may imply that Clement was living in Cappadocia or Jerusalem at that time. He died c. 215 AD at an unknown location.

== Theological works ==
Klementos Alexandreos ta heuriskomena (1715)

=== Trilogy ===
Three of Clement's major works have survived in full and they are collectively referred to as a trilogy:

- The Protrepticus (Exhortation) – written c. 195 AD
- The Paedagogus (Tutor) – written c. 198 AD
- The Stromata (Miscellanies) – written c. 198 AD–c. 203 AD

==== Protrepticus ====
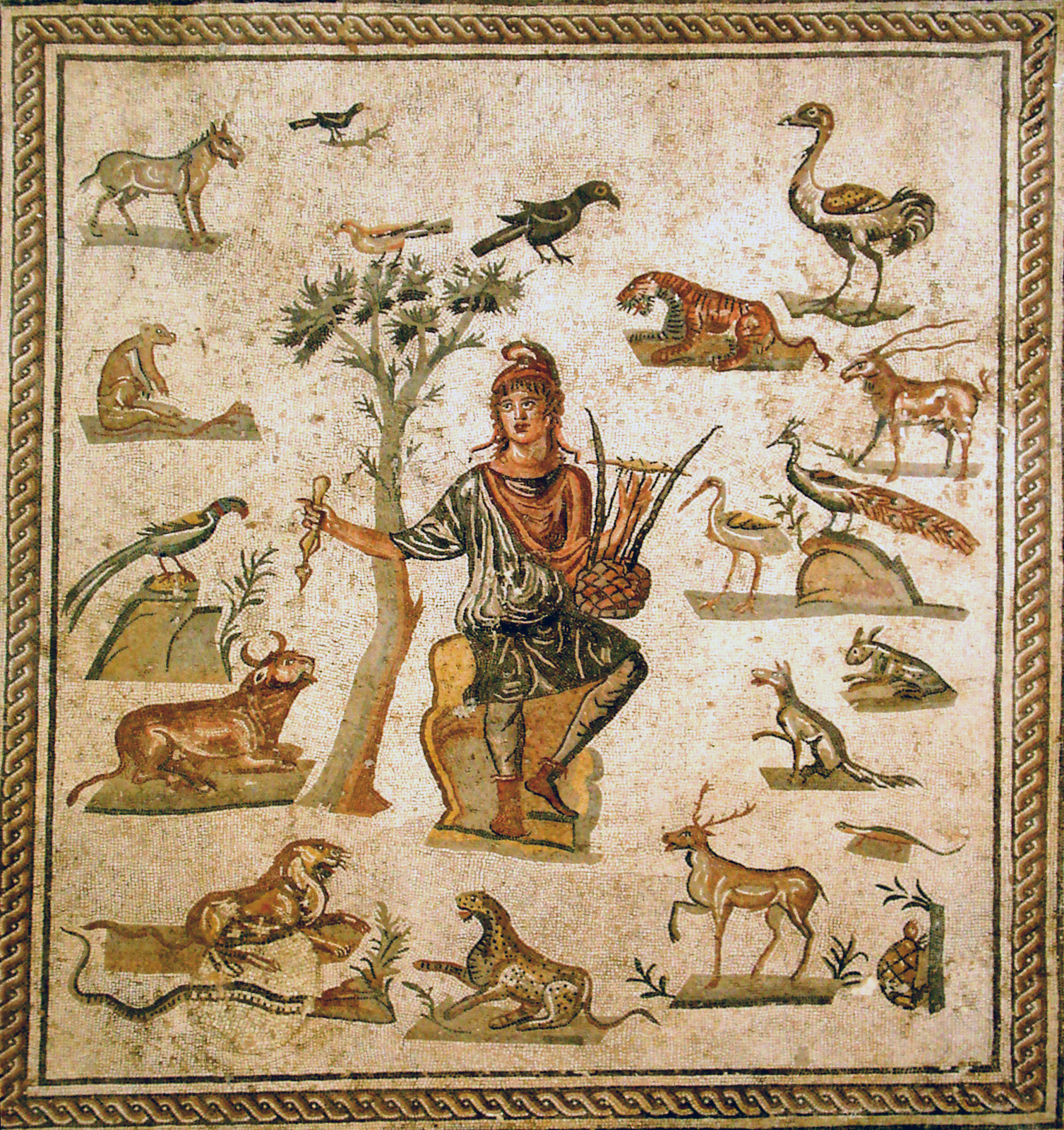
The Orphic mysteries are used as an example of the false cults of Greek paganism in the Protrepticus.

The Protrepticus (Greek: Προτρεπτικὸς πρὸς Ἕλληνας: "Exhortation to the Greeks") is, as its title suggests, an exhortation to the pagans of Greece to adopt Christianity. Within it, Clement demonstrates his extensive knowledge of pagan mythology and theology. It is chiefly important due to Clement's exposition of religion as an anthropological phenomenon. After a short philosophical discussion, it opens with a history of Greek religion in seven stages. Clement suggests that at first, humans mistakenly believed the Sun, the Moon, and other heavenly bodies to be deities. The next developmental stage was the worship of the products of agriculture, from which he contends the cults of Demeter and Dionysus arose. Humans then paid reverence to revenge and deified human feelings of love and fear, among others. In the following stage, the poets Hesiod and Homer attempt to enumerate the deities; Hesiod's Theogony giving the number of twelve. Finally, humans reached a stage when they proclaimed others, such as Asclepius and Heracles, as deities. Discussing idolatry, Clement contends that the objects of primitive religion were unshaped wood and stone, and idols thus arose when such natural items were carved. Following Plato, Clement is critical of all forms of visual art, suggesting that artworks are but illusions and "deadly toys".

Clement criticizes Greek paganism in the Protrepticus on the basis that its deities are both false and poor moral examples. He attacks the mystery religions for their ritualism and mysticism. In particular, the worshippers of Dionysus are ridiculed by him for their family-based rituals (such as the use of children's toys in ceremony). He suggests at some points that the pagan deities are based on humans, but at other times he suggests that they are misanthropic demons, and he cites several classical sources in support of this second hypothesis. Clement, like many pre-Nicene church fathers, writes favorably about Euhemerus and other rationalist philosophers, on the grounds that they at least saw the flaws in paganism. However, his greatest praise is reserved for Plato, whose apophatic views of God prefigure Christianity.

The figure of Orpheus is prominent throughout the Protrepticus narrative, and Clement contrasts the song of Orpheus, representing pagan superstition, with the divine Logos of Christ. According to Clement, through conversion to Christianity alone can one fully participate in the Logos, which is universal truth.

==== Paedagogus ====
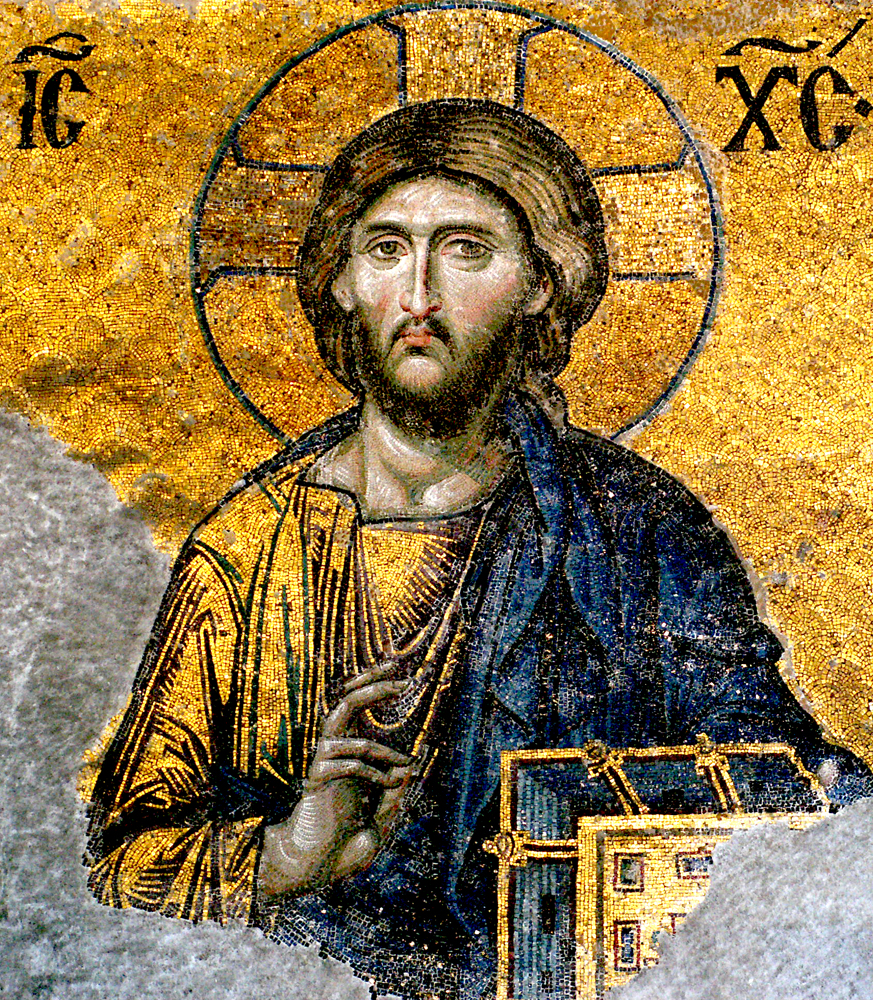
Christ, the Logos incarnate, is the Paedagogus of the work's title.

The title of Paedagogus, translatable as "tutor", refers to Christ as the teacher of all humans, and it features an extended metaphor of Christians as children. Clement intends to show how the Christian should respond to the Love of God authentically. Following Plato (Republic 4:441), he divides life into three elements: character, actions, and passions. The first having been dealt with in the Protrepticus, he devotes the Paedagogus to reflections on Christ's role in teaching humans to act morally and to control their passions. Despite its explicitly Christian nature, Clement's work draws on Stoic philosophy and pagan literature; Homer, alone, is cited more than sixty times in the work.

Although Christ, like a human, is made in the image of God, he alone shares the likeness of God the Father. Christ is both sinless and apathetic, and thus by striving to imitate Christ, one can achieve salvation. To Clement, sin is involuntary, and thus irrational (άλογον), removed only through the wisdom of the Logos. God's guidance away from sin is thus a manifestation of God's universal love for mankind. The word play on λόγος and άλογον is characteristic of Clement's writing, and may be rooted in the Epicurean belief that relationships between words are deeply reflective of relationships between the objects they signify.

Clement argues for the equality of sexes, on the grounds that salvation is extended to all humans equally. Unusually, he suggests that Christ is neither female nor male, and that God the Father has both female and male aspects: the eucharist is described as milk from the breast (Christ) of the Father. Clement is supportive of women playing an active role in the leadership of the church and he provides a list of women he considers inspirational, which includes both Biblical and Classical Greek figures. It has been suggested that Clement's progressive views on gender as set out in the Paedagogus were influenced by Gnosticism; however, later in the work, he argues against the Gnostics that faith, not esoteric knowledge (γνῶσις), is required for salvation. According to Clement, it is through faith in Christ that one is enlightened and comes to know God.

In the second book, Clement provides practical rules on living a Christian life. He argues against overindulgence in food and in favor of good table manners. While prohibiting drunkenness, he promotes the drinking of alcohol in moderation following 1 Timothy 5:23. Clement argues for a simple way of life in accordance with the innate simplicity of Christian monotheism. He condemns elaborate and expensive furnishings and clothing, and argues against overly passionate music and perfumes, but Clement does not believe in the abandonment of worldly pleasures and argues that the Christian should be able to express joy in God's creation through gaiety and partying. He opposes the wearing of garlands, because the picking of the flowers ultimately kills a beautiful creation of God, and the garland resembles the crown of thorns.

Clement treats sex at some length. He argues that both promiscuity and sexual abstinence are unnatural, and that the main goal of human sexuality is procreation. He argues that adultery, sex with pregnant women, concubinage, homosexuality, and prostitution all should be avoided as they will not contribute toward the generation of legitimate offspring.

In his third book, Clement continues along a similar vein, condemning cosmetics on the grounds that it is one's soul, not the body, one should seek to beautify. Clement also opposes the dyeing of men's hair and male depilation as being effeminate. He advises choosing one's company carefully, to avoid being corrupted by immoral people, and while arguing that material wealth is no sin in itself, it is too likely to distract one from the infinitely more important spiritual wealth that is found in Christ. The work finishes with selections of scripture supporting Clement's argument, and following a prayer, the lyrics of a hymn.

==== Stromata ====
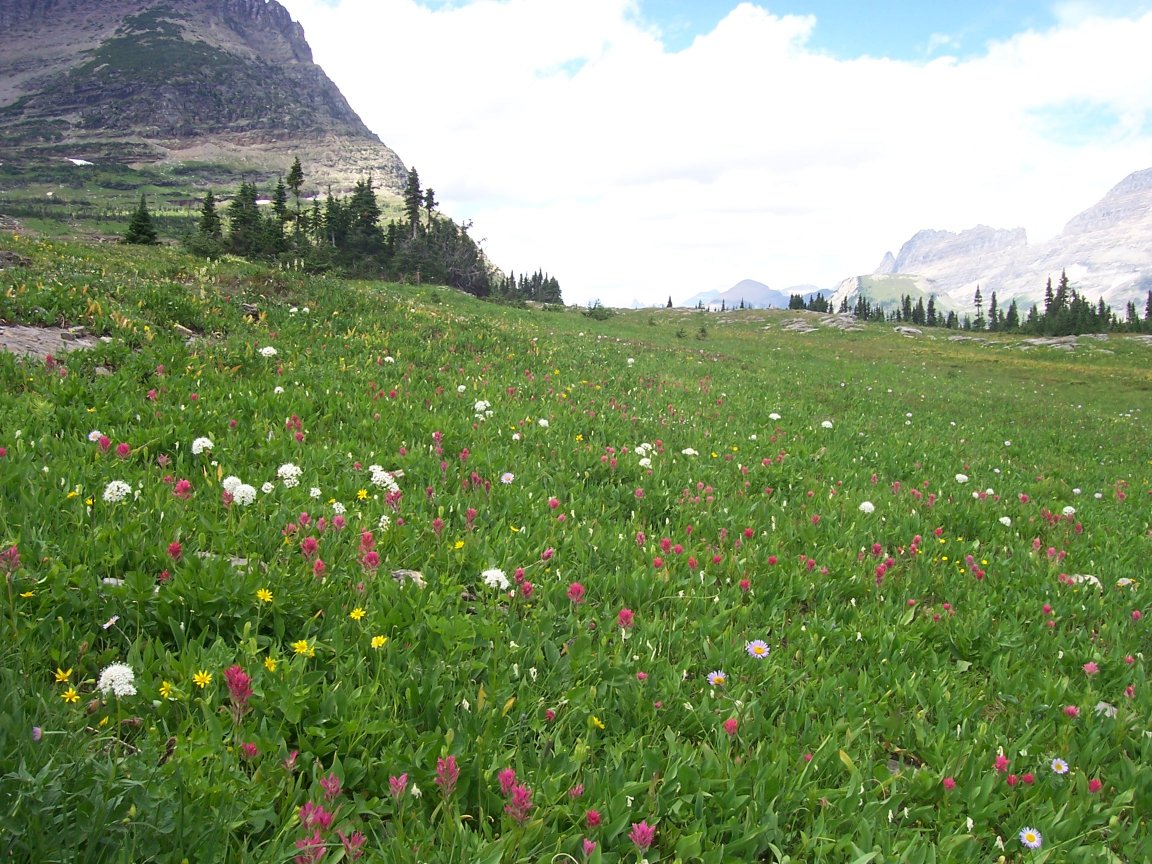
Clement describes the Stromata as a work on various subjects that spring up in the text like flowers in a meadow.

The contents of the Stromata, as its title suggests, are miscellaneous. Its place in the trilogy is disputed – Clement initially intended to write the Didasculus, a work that would complement the practical guidance of the Paedagogus with a more intellectual schooling in theology. The Stromata is less systematic and ordered than Clement's other works, and it has been theorized by André Méhat that it was intended for a limited, esoteric readership. Although Eusebius wrote of the eight books of the work, only seven undoubtedly survive. Photius, writing in the 9th century, found various text appended to manuscripts of the seven canonical books, which led Daniel Heinsius to suggest that the original eighth book is lost, and he identified the text purported to be from the eighth book as fragments of the Hypotyposes.

The first book starts on the topic of Greek philosophy. Consistent with his other writing, Clement affirms that philosophy had a propaedeutic role for the Greeks, similar to the function of the law for the Jews. He then embarks on a discussion of the origins of Greek culture and technology, arguing that most of the important figures in the Greek world were foreigners, and that Jewish culture was the most significant influence on Greece. In an attempt to demonstrate the primacy of Moses, Clement gives an extended chronology of the world, wherein he dates the birth of Christ to 25 April or May, 4–2 BC, and the creation of the world to 5592 BC. The books ends with a discussion on the origin of languages and the possibility of a Jewish influence on Plato.

The second book is largely devoted to the respective roles of faith and philosophical argument. Clement contends that while both are important, the fear of God is foremost, because through faith one receives divine wisdom. To Clement, scripture is an innately true primitive philosophy that is complemented by human reason through the Logos. Faith is voluntary, and the decision to believe is a crucial fundamental step in becoming closer to God. It is never irrational, as it is founded on the knowledge of the truth of the Logos, but all knowledge proceeds from faith, as first principles are unprovable outside a systematic structure.

The third book covers asceticism. He discusses marriage, which is treated similarly in the Paedagogus. Clement rejects the Gnostic opposition to marriage, arguing that only men who are uninterested in women should remain celibate, and that sex is a positive good if performed within marriage for the purposes of procreation. He argues that this has not always been so: the Fall occurred because Adam and Eve succumbed to their desire for each other, and copulated before the allotted time. He argues against the idea that Christians should reject their family for an ascetic life, contending that Jesus would not have contradicted the precept to "Honour thy Father and thy Mother", one of the Ten Commandments. Clement concludes that asceticism will only be rewarded if the motivation is Christian in nature, and thus the asceticism of non-Christians such as the gymnosophists is pointless.

Clement begins the fourth book with a belated explanation of the disorganized nature of the work, and gives a brief description of his aims for the remaining three or four books. The fourth book focuses on martyrdom. While all good Christians should be unafraid of death, Clement condemns those who actively seek out a martyr's death, arguing that they do not have sufficient respect for God's gift of life. He is ambivalent about whether any believing Christians can become martyrs by virtue of the manner of their death, or whether martyrdom is reserved for those who have lived exceptional lives. Marcionites cannot become martyrs, because they do not believe in the divinity of God the Father, so their sufferings are in vain. There is then a digression to the subject of theological epistemology. According to Clement, there is no way of empirically testing the existence of God the Father, because the Logos has revelatory, not analysable meaning, although Christ was an object of the senses. God had no beginning, and is the universal first principle.

The fifth book returns to the subject of faith. Clement argues that truth, justice, and goodness can be seen only by the mind, not the eye; faith is a way of accessing the unseeable. He stresses that knowledge of God can only be achieved through faith once one's moral faults have been corrected. This parallels Clement's earlier insistence that martyrdom can only be achieved by those who practice their faith in Christ through good deeds, not those who simply profess their faith. God transcends matter entirely, and thus the materialist cannot truly come to know God. Although Christ was God incarnate, it is spiritual, not physical comprehension of him that is important.

In the beginning of the sixth book, Clement intends to demonstrate that the works of Greek poets were derived from the prophetic books of the Bible. To reinforce his position that the Greeks were inclined toward plagiarism, he cites numerous instances of such inappropriate appropriation by classical Greek writers, reported second-hand from On Plagiarism, an anonymous 3rd-century BC work sometimes ascribed to Aretades. Clement then digresses to the subject of sin and hell, arguing that Adam was not perfect when created, but given the potential to achieve perfection. He espouses broadly universalist doctrine, holding that Christ's promise of salvation is available to all, even those condemned to hell.

The final extant book begins with Clement arguing that his version of Gnosticism (what he calls the 'Christian gnostic' earlier in Stromata) is the true religion and states they should be an example of what a true Christian is, even saying they are "holy and pious" and "worships the true God in a manner worthy of him". Clement then gives a description of the nature of Christ, and that of the true Christian, who aims to be as similar as possible to both the Father and the Son. Clement then criticizes the simplistic anthropomorphism of most ancient religions, quoting Xenophanes' famous description of African, Thracian, and Egyptian deities. He indicates that the Greek deities may also have had their origins in the personification of material objects: Ares representing iron, and Dionysus wine. Prayer, and the relationship between love and knowledge are then discussed. Corinthians 13:8 seems to contradict the characterization of the true Christian as one who knows; but to Clement knowledge vanishes only in that it is subsumed by the universal love expressed by the Christian in reverence for the Creator. Following Socrates, he argues that vice arises from a state of ignorance, not from intention. The Christian is a "laborer in God's vineyard", responsible both for one's own path to salvation and that of one's neighbor. The work ends with an extended passage against the contemporary divisions and heresies within the church.

=== Other works ===
Besides the great trilogy, Clement's only other extant work is the treatise Salvation for the Rich, also known as Who is the Rich Man who is Saved? written c. 203 AD Having begun with a scathing criticism of the corrupting effects of money and misguided servile attitudes toward the wealthy, Clement discusses the implications of Mark 10:25. The rich are either unconvinced by the promise of eternal life, or unaware of the conflict between the possession of material and spiritual wealth, and the good Christian has a duty to guide them toward a better life through the Gospel. Jesus' words are not to be taken literally – the supercelestial (ὑπερουράνιος) meanings should be sought in which the true route to salvation is revealed. The holding of material wealth in itself is not a wrong, so long as it is used charitably, but Christians should be careful not to let their wealth dominate their spirit. It is more important to give up sinful passions than external wealth. If the rich are to be saved, all they must do is to follow the two commandments, and while material wealth is of no value to God, it can be used to alleviate the suffering of neighbors.

Other known works exist in fragments alone, including the four eschatological works in the secret tradition: Hypotyposes, Excerpta ex Theodoto, Eclogae Propheticae, and the Adumbraetiones. These cover Clement's celestial hierarchy, a complex schema in which the universe is headed by the Face of God, below which lie seven protoctists, followed by archangels, angels, and humans. According to Jean Daniélou, this schema is inherited from a Judaeo-Christian esotericism, followed by the Apostles, which was only imparted orally to those Christians who could be trusted with such mysteries. The proctocists are the first beings created by God, and act as priests to the archangels. Clement identifies them both as the "Eyes of the Lord" and with the Thrones. Clement characterizes the celestial forms as entirely different from anything earthly, although he argues that members of each order only seem incorporeal to those of lower orders. According to the Eclogae Propheticae, every thousand years every member of each order moves up a degree, and thus humans can become angels. Even the protoctists can be elevated, although their new position in the hierarchy is not clearly defined. The apparent contradiction between the fact that there can be only seven protoctists but also a vast number of archangels to be promoted to their order is problematical. One modern solution regards the story as an example of "interiorized apocalypticism": imagistic details are not to be taken literally, but as symbolizing interior transformation.

The titles of several lost works are known because of a list in Eusebius' Ecclesiastical History, 6.13.1–3. They include the Outlines, in eight books, and Against Judaizers. Others are known only from mentions in Clement's own writings, including On Marriage and On Prophecy, although few are attested by other writers and it is difficult to separate works that he intended to write from those that were completed.

The Mar Saba letter was attributed to Clement by Morton Smith, but there remains much debate today over whether it is an authentic letter from Clement, an ancient pseudepigraph, or a modern forgery. If authentic, its main significance would be in its relating that the Apostle Mark came to Alexandria from Rome and there, wrote a more spiritual Gospel, which he entrusted to the Church in Alexandria on his death; if genuine, the letter pushes back the tradition related by Eusebius connecting Mark with Alexandria by a century.

== Legacy ==
Eusebius, the fourth-century early church historian, is the first writer to provide an account of Clement's life and works, in his Ecclesiastical History, 5.11.1–5, 6.6.1 (Note: Of the two sections dedicated to Clement, Eccl. Hist. 6.6.1 seems decidedly out of place, and Valesius argued that this was evidence that Eusebius never revised his work.) He provides a list of Clement's works, biographical information, and an extended quotation from the Stromata. From this and other accounts, it is evident that Clement was highly revered by his contemporaries and later patristic figures. As J.B. Mayor observes, "The piety and learning of Clement, his power as a teacher and philosopher, are spoken of in the highest terms by succeeding fathers."

In the same work, Eusebius cites Alexander of Jerusalem (180–251) lauding "the holy Clement, who was both my master and benefactor," describing him as one of the "blessed fathers who have trod the path before us," while Eusebius himself is quoted as calling him "an incomparable master of Christian philosophy." Jerome (342–420) calls Clement "the most learned of men," recording that his writings are "full of eloquence and learning, both in sacred Scripture and in secular literature." The aforementioned Alexander of Jerusalem is quoted by Jerome praising "the blessed presbyter Clement, a man illustrious and approved." According to Theodoret (393–450), "he surpassed all others, and was a holy man." Likewise, Cyril of Alexandria (376–444) says Clement was "a man admirably learned and skillful, and one that searched to the depths all the learning of the Greeks, with an exactness rarely attained before." Maximus the Confessor (580–662) refers to him reverentially as "the great Clement."

More recently, scholars have acknowledged Clement's primacy and importance in various respects. He has been called "the first Christian scholar" (Shelley), "the first systematic teacher of Christian doctrine" (Patrick), "the first great teacher of philosophical Christianity" (Hatch), "the first self-conscious theologian and ethicist" (Backhouse), "the first great Christian teacher in Alexandria" (Needham), "the founder of Christian philosophical theology" (Bray), "the true creator of ecclesiastical theology" (DeFaye), "the first major commentator on the Bible" (Bray), "the founder of Christian literature" (ANF), "the great founder of the Alexandrian School" (Coxe), a "pioneer of Christian scholarship" (ACCS), "an intellectual giant in the early church" (Kruger), "that man of genius who introduced Christianity to itself, as reflected in the burnished mirror of his intellect" (Coxe), and "the most inquisitive and independent spirit that has perhaps ever appeared in the Church" (DeFaye).

Stylistically, it has been noted that "his writings shine with a happy, peaceful, optimistic spirit; reading them can be a remarkably uplifting experience" (Needham). "He loves God's creation and sees it as good; he gives us a warm, joyous picture of life; he is richly human, sane, and moderate" (Ferguson). Additionally, Clement's works "are a storehouse of curious ancient lore—a museum of the fossil remains of the beauties and monstrosities of the world of pagan antiquity, during all the epochs and phases of its history" (Wilson). "His prodigious erudition was unsurpassed even by that of Origen" (Cayre). "I do not know where we shall look for a purer or a truer man than this Clemens of Alexandria; he seems to me one of the old fathers whom we should all have reverenced most as a teacher, and loved best as a friend" (Maurice).

Nonetheless, there have been a few detracting voices. Photios I of Constantinople writes polemically against Clement's theology in the Bibliotheca, although he also is appreciative of Clement's learning and the literary merits of his work. In particular, he is highly critical of the Hypotyposes, a work of biblical exegesis of which only a few fragments have survived. Photios compared Clement's treatise, which, like his other works, was highly syncretic, featuring ideas of Hellenistic, Jewish, and Gnostic origin, unfavorably against the prevailing orthodoxy of the 9th century. Amongst the particular ideas Photios deemed heretical were:

- The belief that matter and thought are eternal, and thus did not originate from God, contradicting the doctrine of Creatio ex nihilo.
- The belief in cosmic cycles predating the creation of the world, following Heraclitus, which is extra-Biblical in origin.
- The belief that Christ, as Logos, was in some sense created, contrary to John 1, but following Philo.
- Ambivalence toward docetism, the heretical doctrine that Christ's earthly body was an illusion.
- The belief that Eve was created from Adam's sperm after he ejaculated during the night.
- The belief that Genesis 6:2 implies that angels indulged in sexual intercourse with human women.
- The belief in reincarnation, i.e., the transmigration of souls.

However, it is not clear that these are accurate representations of Clement's actual beliefs, since his extant writings appear to be mostly in line with what would come to be considered orthodox Christian theology. It has been suggested that Photios may have misunderstood Clement to be speaking for himself when he was often quoting from Gnostics and other sects without agreeing with their teachings.

As one of the earliest of the Church fathers whose works have survived, he is the subject of a significant amount of recent academic work, focusing on, among other things, his exegesis of scripture, his Logos-theology and pneumatology, his belief in apokatastasis, the relationship between his thought and non-Christian philosophy, and his influence on Origen.

=== Veneration ===
Up until the 17th century Clement was venerated as a saint in the Catholic Church. His name was to be found in the martyrologies, and his feast fell on the fourth of December, but when the Roman Martyrology was revised by Pope Clement VIII his name was dropped from the calendar on the advice of Cardinal Baronius. Benedict XIV maintained this decision of his predecessor on the grounds that Clement's life was little known, that he had never obtained public cultus in the Church, and that some of his doctrines were, if not erroneous, at least suspect.

Although Clement is not widely venerated in Eastern Christianity, the Prologue of Ohrid repeatedly refers to him as a saint, as do various Orthodox authorities including the Greek Metropolitan Kallinikos of Edessa.

The Coptic tradition considers Clement a saint. Saint Clement Coptic Orthodox Christian Academy in Nashville, Tennessee, is specifically named after him.

Clement is commemorated in Anglicanism.

== Theology ==
=== Gnosis ===
Clement taught that faith was the basis of salvation; he also believed that faith was the basis of gnosis—which to him meant spiritual and mystical knowledge. Clement of Alexandria appropriated the word gnosis from the Gnostics (whom he opposed) but reinterpreted the word in a more Christian manner. He distinguished between two kinds of Christians: the pistic Christian who lives according to God's law, and the Christian gnostic who lives on the level of the gospel and responds by discipline and love. Clement's views of gnosis can be considered a forerunner of the Christian monastic movement that began in Egypt after his death.

=== Philosophy ===
Clement suggested that philosophy was a preparatory discipline to the Greek world preceding its wide acceptance of Christianity and often sought to harmonize insights of Greek philosophy with biblical teaching. He defined philosophy as "the desire for true being and the studies which lead to it." Clement has been described as "the founder of what was to become the great tradition of Christian philosophical theology." He was a forerunner to some of the later views of Augustine, such as just war theory and the theory of the two cities.

=== Universalism ===
Clement is often regarded as one of the first Christian universalists. He espoused a belief in the eventual salvation of all, though with less systematic clarity than his disciple Origen. As Patristics scholar Illaria Ramelli has observed, Clement believed divine punishment to be corrective and remedial rather than merely retributive or destructive, and "In Stromateis 7:2:12 Clement is clear that God's project, aim, and activity is universal salvation: 'The God of the universe has disposed everything for universal salvation, in general and singularly.'"

=== Education ===
For Clement, disciplining the body would help the Christian discipline the soul; he gave detailed instructions on proper Christian conduct, decorum, and relationships in the second and third books of The Instructor. According to Clement, once the passions are subject to the authority of the Word (or reason), the Christian can embark on an advanced course of philosophical study and contemplation.

Clement adopted a position that gave rise to a whole stream of later Christian thought: true philosophy and authentic human knowledge have their origin in the Logos, which is the unique source of all truth. He accepts the conception of παιδεία as he conducts the wisdom taught by the Logos through education in the sacred letters: on the one hand, the Greek παιδεία prepares the mind of the Christian to distinguish and defend the truth, and, on the other, the liberal arts help the new Christian to direct all his efforts towards the truly useful of each particular discipline, geometry, music, grammar and philosophy.

Notably (considering the time period), Clement seemed to advocate for the equality of women and men in the area of education, at least within the context of Christian spirituality and ethics. He wrote, "Let us recognize, too, that both men and women practice the same sort of virtue; surely, if there is but one God for both, then there is but one Educator for both."

=== Economics ===
Clement opposed a literal interpretation of the command "sell what you have and give to the poor," and argued that the Bible does not command every person to renounce all property, and that wealth can be used either for good or evil. David Bentley Hart argues that Clement did so grudgingly, referring to private property as "the fruit of wickedness" and encouraged communal pooling of resources for the purpose of redistribution to the poor.

=== Creation ===
Clement believed that the days mentioned in Genesis are allegorical. Clement assumed a double creation, one of an invisible world and the second being material creation. He believed that formless matter existed before the creation of the world, being influenced by Plato. Clement tried to interpret Genesis 6 in harmony with the Book of Enoch.

=== Others ===
Clement of Alexandria was the first person in church history to introduce a view of an invisible and a visible church. Because Clement saw the Protoevangelium of James as canonical, it could imply he believed in the perpetual virginity of Mary, though some have argued that he does not seem to believe in the sinlessness of Mary.

Clement of Alexandria interprets "Fire of Wisdom" which prevades the soul as by a baptism. He used the word "symbol" to define the Eucharist, and interpreted John 6 to be an allegory about faith, however his views on real presence are disputed.

Clement of Alexandria was apparently an amillennialist.

== Works ==
=== Editions ===
- Sylburg, Friedrich (ed.) (1592). Clementis Alexandrini Opera Quae Extant. Archived 2020-07-29 at the Wayback Machine Heidelberg: ex typographeio Hieronymi Commelini.
- Heinsius, Daniel (ed.) (1616). Clementis Alexandrini Opera Graece et Latine Quae Extant. Archived 2020-07-29 at the Wayback Machine Leiden: excudit Ioannes Patius academiae typographus.
- Potter, John (ed.) (1715). Clementis Alexandrini Opera, 2 vols. Oxonii: e theatro Sheldoniano. Vol. 1. Cohortatio ad gentes. Paedagogus. Stromatum I-IV. Archived 2020-07-29 at the Wayback Machine Vol. 2. Stromatum V-VIII. Quis dives salvetur. Excerpta Theodoti. Prophetarum ecologiae. Fragmenta. Archived 2020-07-29 at the Wayback Machine
- Klotz, Reinhold (ed.) (1831–34). Titi Flaui Clementis Alexandrini Opera Omnia, 4 vols. Leipzig: E. B. Schwickert. Vol. 1. Ρrotrepticus. Paedagogus. Archived 2020-07-29 at the Wayback Machine Vol. 2. Stromatorum I-IV. Archived 2020-07-29 at the Wayback Machine Vol. 3. Stromatourm V-VIII. Quis dives salvetur. Archived 2020-07-29 at the Wayback Machine Vol. 4. Fragmenta. Scholia. Annotationes. Indices. Archived 2020-07-29 at the Wayback Machine
- Migne, J.-P. (ed.) (1857). Clementis Alexandrini Opera Quae Exstant Omnia, 2 toms. (= PG 8, 9) Paris: J.-P. Migne. Tom. 1. Cohortatio ad gentes. Paedagogus. Stromata I-IV. Archived 2020-07-29 at the Wayback Machine Tom. 2. Stromata V-VIII. Quis dives salvetur. Fragmenta.
- Dindorf, Wilhelm (ed.) (1869). Clementis Alexandrini Opera, 4 vols. Oxonni: e typographeo Clarendoniano. Vol. 1. Ρrotrepticus. Paedagogus. Archived 2020-07-29 at the Wayback Machine Vol. 2. Stromatum I-IV. Archived 2020-07-29 at the Wayback Machine Vol. 3. Stromatum V-VIII. Archived 2020-07-29 at the Wayback Machine Vol. 4. Annotationes. Interpretum. Archived 2020-07-29 at the Wayback Machine
- Barnard, P. Mourdant (ed.) (1897). Clement of Alexandria, Quis dives salvetur. Texts and Studies 5/2. Cambridge: Cambridge University Press.
- de:Otto Stählin (ed.) (1905–36). Clemens Alexandrinus, 4 bds. (= GCS 12, 15, 17, 39) Leipzig: J. C. Hinrichs. Bd. 1. Ρrotrepticus und Paedagogus. Archived 2020-07-29 at the Wayback Machine Bd. 2. Stromata I-VI. Archived 2020-07-29 at the Wayback Machine Bd. 3. Stromata VII-VIII. Excerpta ex Theodoto. Eclogae prophetica. Quis dives salvetur. Fragmente. Bd. 4. Register.
- Marcovich, Miroslav and Jacobus C. M. van Winden (eds.) (2002). Clementis Alexandrini Paedagogus. Archived 2020-07-29 at the Wayback Machine Leiden: Brill. ISBN 978-9004124707

=== Translations ===
- Wilson, William (trans.) (1867). "The Writings of Clement of Alexandria". Archived 2020-07-29 at the Wayback Machine In Ante-Nicene Fathers, ed. A. Roberts, et al., 2:163–629. (Reprint 1905) New York: Charles Scribner's Sons.
- Barnard, P. Mourdant (trans.) (1901). A Homily of Clement of Alexandria, Entitled: Who is the Rich Man that is being Saved? Archived 2020-07-29 at the Wayback Machine London: SPCK.
- Hort, F. J. A. and Joseph B. Mayor (eds. & trans.) (1902). Clement of Alexandria, Miscellanies Book VII. Archived 2020-07-29 at the Wayback Machine London: Macmillan. ISBN 978-1108007542
- Patrick, John (1914). Clement of Alexandria, 183-85. Edinburgh: Wm. Blackwood. (Exhortation to Endurance, or, To the Newly Baptized; cf. Butterworth 1919, 371 ff.)
- Butterworth, G. W. (ed. & trans.) (1919). Clement of Alexandria, Exhortation to the Greeks, Rich Man's Salvation, etc. (= LCL 92) Cambridge: Harvard University Press. ISBN 978-0674991033
- Casey, Robert Pierce (ed. & trans.) (1936). The Excerpta ex Theodoto of Clement of Alexandria. Studies and Documents 1. London: Christophers.
- Oulton, J. E. L. and Henry Chadwick (trans.) (1954). Alexandrian Christianity, 40–165. Philadelphia: Westminster Press. (Miscellanies, Books III, VII) ISBN 978-0664241537
- Wood, Simon P. (trans.) (1954). Clement of Alexandria, Christ the Educator. Archived 2020-07-29 at the Wayback Machine Fathers of the Church 23. Washington, D.C.: Catholic University of America Press. ISBN 978-0813215624
- Ferguson, John (trans.) (1991). Clement of Alexandria, Stromateis, Books 1–3. Archived 2020-07-29 at the Wayback Machine Fathers of the Church 85. Washington, D.C.: Catholic University of America Press. ISBN 978-0813214337

== See also ==
- Buddhism and the Roman world
- Alexandrian school
