= Patrophilus of Scythopolis =

Patrophilus was the Arian bishop of Scythopolis in the early-mid 4th century AD. He was an enemy of Athanasius who described him as a πνευματόμαχος or "fighter against the Holy Spirit". When Arius was exiled to Palestine in 323 AD, Patrophilus warmly welcomed him.

Philostorgius lists him among the Arian bishops.

He also trained Eusebius of Emesa in biblical exegesis.

From 354 to 355, he acted together with Acacius of Caesarea to depose the bishop of Jerusalem, Maximus, who supported the Nicene Creed, and replaced him with Cyril, who they thought was also an Arian. He also supervised the exile of Eusebius of Vercelli to Scythopolis - Eusebius calls him his "jailer".

In 359, he was one of a delegation to the emperor Constantius II to protest the depositions of Arian clergy by Basil of Caesarea.

Philostorgius mentions that after his death his body was disinterred and his bones scattered in 361 during the pagan reaction under Julian.

== Literature ==
- Wace, Dictionary of Christian Biography article.
