= Protrepticus =

Protrepticus (Ancient Greek: Προτρεπτικός) may refer to:

- Protrepticus (Aristotle), an exhortation to philosophy by Aristotle, which survives in fragmentary form
- Protrepticus, a work by the Roman writer Ennius
- Protrepticus, an exhortation to the study of the arts in general by Galen
- Protrepticus (Clement), an exhortation to Christian conversion by Clement of Alexandria
- Protrepticus, a work by the Neoplatonist Iamblichus
- Protrepticus, one of the Idyllia of Ausonius

== See also ==
- Protrepsis and paraenesis, two closely related styles of exhortation
- The Hortensius follows the style of a protrepticus.
