= Agapius (Manichaean) =

Agapius (or Agapios) was a philosopher associated with Manichaeism. He is believed to have lived in the fourth or fifth century.

== Identity ==
He is chiefly known for being mentioned in the Bibliotheca, a work by Photius, the ninth-century Patriarch of Constantinople. He is listed by Photius, as well as Peter of Sicily, as being among the twelve disciples of Mani. However, in earlier sixth-century works, such as the abjuration formula of Zacharias of Mytilene and the handbook on abjuration of heresies by Presbyter Timothy of Constantinople, he is not listed as a Manichean but merely as the author of a work entitled the Heptalogue (Heptalogus).

Photius also describes Agapius as challenging the teachings of Eunomius, who, according to Samuel N.C. Lieu, may be identified as Eunomius of Cyzicus, the Arian bishop of Cyzicus in Mysia. Agapius, however, could not have both been a disciple of Mani, who died in 276, and have lived long enough to write against Eunomius of Cyzicus, who began as bishop in 360.

== Writings ==
Photius described reading an unidentified work, possibly the Heptalogue, by Agapius that contained "23 fables and 102 other sections", where Agapius feigns his own Christianity but reveals himself as an "enemy" of Christ. Agapius dedicated his work of twenty-three chapters to his female fellow philosopher Urania.

Photius summarizes Agapius' apparently Manichaean teachings as follows:

"He establishes against God for evermore a wicked, self-subsisting principle, which sometimes he calls nature, sometimes matter and sometimes Satan and the Devil and the ruler of the world and God of This Age, and by countless other names. He maintains that men stumble by necessity and against their will, and that the body belongs to the evil portion but the soul to the divine and (alas what madness!) is of one substance with God. And he mocks the Old Testament (Oh the impiety!) to the evil principle which stands opposed to God. In his telling of fantastic tales he also says that the tree in Paradise is Christ whom he professes with his lips to honour, but whom by his deeds and beliefs he blasphemes more than words can tell."

Agapius, however, appears to have also endorsed ideas unrelated to Manichaeism, such as Orthodox Christian concepts like "the Trinity, the Incarnation, the Baptism, Crucifixion and Resurrection of Christ, the Resurrection of the Dead and the Last Judgment." Photius claims Agapius was able to do so by "altering and translating almost all the terms of piety and of the Christian religion into other meanings..."

Photius mentions that Agapius made use of apocryphal Christian literature, especially the Acts of Andrew, and pagan philosophy in his arguments:

"He adduces arguments by relying on the so-called Acts of the twelve apostles, especially those of Andrew, maintaining that his thought is lifted from them. He also holds to mempsychosis. He sends off to God those who have achieved the zenith of virtue, consigns to fire and darkness those who achieved the nadir of wickednesses, and brings down into bodies once more those who conducted their lives somewhere between these two extremes. He shamelessly employs martyrs and the lovers of Greek religion, especially Plato, to support his fight with God."

Agapius is also described as an author of hymns.
