= Kleine und fragmentarische Historiker der Spätantike =

Late Antique edition of Greek and Latin historiographical texts

Kleine und fragmentarische Historiker der Spätantike (abbreviated KFHist), or ‘Minor and Fragmentary Historians of Late Antiquity’, is an edition of Greek and Latin historiographical texts from Late Antiquity.

The fifteen-year project based at the University of Düsseldorf is directed by Bruno Bleckmann (professor of ancient history) and Markus Stein (professor of classics), and funded by the North Rhine-Westphalian Academy of Sciences, Humanities and the Arts.

The aim is to publish the minor and/or fragmentary texts of nearly 90 authors ranging from the 3rd through the 6th centuries, together with a German translation and a commentary covering both philological and historical matters. The series includes pagan and Christian works, chronicles, annotated consul lists, and larger works that are only transmitted as fragments or excerpts. It also includes works that are not directly attested, but whose content can be reconstructed (like the Enmannsche Kaisergeschichte). The volumes are published by Ferdinand Schöningh.

The first installment, the fragmentary Church History of Philostorgios, appeared in October 2015.

== Volumes ==
- Modul A. Historiker der Reichskrise
  - A 1–4, 6–8: Bruno Bleckmann, Jonathan Groß: Historiker der Reichskrise des 3. Jahrhunderts. Band I, Paderborn 2016, ISBN 978-3-506-78490-2 (Asinius Quadratus, Nikostratos von Trapezunt, Philostratos von Athen, Ephoros von Kyme der Jüngere, Eusebios, Eusebius von Nantes, Onasimos/Onesimus).
- Modul B. Kaisergeschichte und Sammelbiographien des 4. und frühen 5. Jahrhunderts
  - B 3: Bruno Bleckmann, Jonathan Groß: Eutropius, Breviarium ab urbe condita. Paderborn 2018, ISBN 978-3-506-78916-7.
  - B 5–7: Bruno Bleckmann, Jan-Markus Kötter, Mehran A. Nickbakht, In-Yong Song und Markus Stein: Origo gentis Romanorum – Polemius Silvius – Narratio de imperatoribus. Paderborn 2017, ISBN 978-3-506-78791-0 (Origo gentis Romanorum, Polemius Silvius: Nomina omnium principum Romanorum and Breviarium temporum, Narratio de imperatoribus domus Valentinianae et Theodosianae).
- Modul C. Panegyrische Zeitgeschichte des 4. und frühen 5. Jahrhunderts
- Modul D. Profane Geschichtsschreibung des ausgehenden 4. Jahrhunderts
- Modul E. Kirchenhistoriker
  - E 7: Bruno Bleckmann, Markus Stein: Philostorgios, Kirchengeschichte. Editiert, übersetzt und kommentiert. Band 1: Einleitung, Text und Übersetzung; Band 2: Kommentar. Paderborn 2015, ISBN 978-3-506-78199-4.
- Modul F. Griechische Profanhistoriker von Theodosius II. bis Anastasios
- Modul G. Chroniken und Chronikfortsetzungen des 5. und 6. Jahrhunderts
  - G 1–4: Maria Becker, Bruno Bleckmann, Jonathan Groß, Mehran A. Nickbakht: Consularia Constantinopolitana und verwandte Quellen. Consularia Constantinopolitana · Fastenquelle des Sokrates · Berliner Chronik · Alexandrinische Weltchronik. Paderborn 2016, ISBN 978-3-506-78210-6.
  - G 5–6: Maria Becker, Jan-Markus Kötter: Prosper Tiro. Chronik – Laterculus regum Vandalorum et Alanorum. Paderborn 2016, ISBN 978-3-506-78211-3.
  - G 7–8: Jan-Markus Kötter, Carlo Scardino: Gallische Chroniken. Paderborn 2017, ISBN 978-3-506-78489-6 (Chronicle from 452; Chronicle from 511).
  - G 9–10: Jan-Markus Kötter, Carlo Scardino (Hrsg.): Chronik des Hydatius. Fortführung der Spanischen Epitome. Paderborn 2019, ISBN 978-3-506-78915-0.
- Modul H. Lateinische Profanhistoriker des 5./6. Jahrhunderts
- Modul I. Griechische Profanhistoriker des 6. Jahrhunderts
