= John of Scythopolis =

6th-century Byzantine bishop

John of Scythopolis (Greek: Ίωάννης ό Σκυθοπολίτης; c. 536–550), also known as "the Scholasticus", bishop of Scythopolis in Palestine (modern Beit She'an), was a Byzantine theologian and lawyer adhering to neo-Chalcedonian theology.

He wrote several works (now lost) against the Monophysite heresy: the most important one was a treatise written c. 530, defending the theory of "dioenergism", against his contemporary Severus of Antioch. Another work attacked the heretic Eutyches, one of the founders of Monophysitism. His works were known to Photius, bishop of Constantinople, who also provides biographical data on John in codex 95 of his erudite work Bibliotheca.

Hans Urs von Balthasar suggested that John could be the author of a part of the scholia on the Corpus Areopagiticum normally attributed to Maximus the Confessor.

Byzantinist Carlo Maria Mazzucchi suggested that John of Scythopolis was aware that the Corpus Areopagiticum was a forgery, and that his awareness is revealed by his extensive marginal commentary – despite the fact that John's commentary apparently defends the originality of the Corpus.

John's prologue to and commentary on the treatise On the Divine Names have been edited by Beate Regina Suchla in the framework of the comprehensive critical edition of the Corpus itself, promoted by the German Academy of Sciences.

== Bibliography ==
- Balthasar, H. U. (von) (1940). "Das Scholienwerk des Johannes von Scythopolis". Scholastik. 15 (16–38).
- Daley, B. E. (2004). "Balthasar's reading of the Church Fathers". In Oakes, E. T.; Moss, D. (eds.). The Cambridge Companion to Hans Urs von Balthasar. Cambridge: University Press. pp. 187–206.
- Harrington, M. (2001). "Anastatius the Librarian's Reading of the Greek Scholia on the Pseudo-Dionysian Corpus". In Wiles, M. F.; Yarnold, E. J.; Parvis, P. M. (eds.). Papers Presented to the Thirteenth International Conference on Patristic Studie held in Oxford 1999: Critica et Philologica; Nachleben; First Two Centuries; Tertullian to Arnobius; Egypt before Nicaea; Athanasius and his Opponents. Studia Patristica, XXXVI. Leuven: Peeters. pp. 119–125.
- Mazzucchi, C. M. (2014). "John of Scythopolis' Marginal Commentary on the Corpus Dionysiacum". Trends in Classics. 6 (1): 170–175. doi:10.1515/tc-2014-0009.
- Mazzucchi, C. M. (2017). "Impudens societas, sive Ioannes Scythopolitanus conscius Areopagiticae fraudi" [An insolent coven, or: John of Scythopolis aware of the Areopagite fraud]. Aevum (in Latin). 91 (2): 289–294. JSTOR 26497004.
- Photios (1920). The Library. Vol. I. Translated by J. H. Freese. London – New York: Macmillan.
- Ioannes Scythopolitanus (2011). Suchla, B. R. (ed.). Prologus et scholia in Dionysii Areopagitae librum De divinis nominibus cum additamentis interpretum aliorum. Patristische Texte und Studien, 62 • Corpus Dionysiacum, IV,1. Berlin – Boston: Walter de Gruyter. doi:10.1515/9783110252323. ISBN 9783110195712.
