= Nonnosus (historian) =

Nonnosus (Greek: Νόννοσος, romanized: Nónnosos) was an ambassador sent by the Byzantine emperor Justinian I to the ruler of Kinda in central Arabia and then to Aksumites and Himyarites in the year 530 CE. He wrote an account of that visit, now lost, that was read and summarized by Byzantine patriarch Photius in Codex 3 of his Bibliotheca. According to Photius, the report emphasized the courage of Nonnosus in hazardous situations and contained information on the religion and language of the Arabs. Nonnosus entered Ethiopia through the Red Sea port city of Adulis and journeyed overland to Axum. He described Aksum as a "very large city" and the capital of Aethiopia. He described seeing a herd of 5000 elephants in the vicinity of Aua, between Adulis and Axum. He also mentions meeting pygmies on the islands of Farasan. Nonnosus' father Abraham had been an ambassador to the Arabs, and his uncle, also named Nonnosus, had been sent on an embassy by the emperor Anastasius I.

The mid-6th century Chronicle of Ioannis Malalas (Book 18.457) and the later chronicle of Theophanes include, without citing their source, a detailed description probably derived from Nonnosus' account of his meeting with the Axumite ruler. Malalas names him as Elesboas and calls him king of the Indians, while Theophanes names him as Arethas and identifies him as king of the Ethiopians. According to Malalas, the Byzantine ambassador performed proskynesis and was warmly received by the king, who was mounted on a spectacular gilded platform atop four elephants yoked together. The Axumite ruler, eager for good relations with Justinian, kissed the imperial seal on the letter Nonnosus presented, and agreed to wage war on the Persians on Justinian's behalf (this is not found in the sources, instead it is Nonnosus who kisses Kaleb's ring). In practice, however, Nonnosus' embassy failed to generate any significant military contribution by the Axumites.
