= Stromata =

2nd century work by Clement of Alexandria

The Stromata (Greek: Στρώματα), a mistake for Stromateis (Στρωματεῖς, "Patchwork," i.e., Miscellanies), attributed to Clement of Alexandria (c. 150 – c. 215), is the third of a trilogy of works regarding the Christian life. The oldest extant manuscripts date to the eleventh century. The work is titled Stromateis ("patchwork”) because it deals with such a variety of matters. It goes further than its two predecessors and aims at the perfection of the Christian life by initiation into complete knowledge. It attempts, on the basis of Scripture and tradition, to give such an account of the Christian faith as shall answer all the demands of learned men, and conduct the student into the innermost realities of his belief.

The contents of the Stromateis, as its title suggests, are miscellaneous. Its place in the trilogy is disputed – Clement initially intended to write the Didascalus, a work which would complement the practical guidance of the Paedagogus with a more intellectual schooling in theology. The Stromata is less systematic and ordered than Clement's other works, and it has been theorized by André Méhat that it was intended for a limited, esoteric readership.

== Manuscript history ==
The sole authority for the Stromateis is preserved at the Laurentian Library in Florence. How it came to Florence is unknown. The editio princeps was published by Piero Vettori in 1550.

In the 19th century, Percy Mordaunt Barnard and Otto Stählin posited that this manuscript was copied out in the 910s for Arethas of Caesarea, the remainder of whose extant library is held by the Bibliothèque nationale de France. Their theory is generally accepted today. As with the library of Arethas held at Paris, the Laurentian manuscript contains numerous misspellings, omitted words and sentences and even marginalia integrated into the text. However, Frederic G. Kenyon argued that this is not the fault of the copyist, but that an ancestral manuscript had caused the damage, perhaps even a papyrus.

== Contents of the books ==
The first book written c. 198 AD starts on the topic of Greek philosophy. Consistent with his other writing, Clement affirms that philosophy had a propaedeutic role for the Greek, similar to the function of the law for the Jews. He then embarks on a discussion of the origins of Greek culture and technology, arguing that most of the important figures in the Greek world were foreigners, and (erroneously) that Jewish culture was the most significant influence on Greece. In an attempt to demonstrate the primacy of Moses, Clement gives an extended chronology of the world, wherein he dates the birth of Christ to 25 April or May, 4-2 B.C., and the creation of the world to 5592 B.C. The book ends with a discussion on the origin of languages and the possibility of a Jewish influence on Plato.

The second book written c. 199 AD-c. 201 AD is largely devoted to the respective roles of faith and philosophical argument. Clement contends that while both are important, the fear of God is foremost, because through faith one receives divine wisdom. To Clement, scripture is an innately true primitive philosophy which is complemented by human reason through the Logos. Faith is voluntary, and the decision to believe is a crucial fundamental step in becoming closer to God. It is never irrational, as it is founded on the knowledge of the truth of the Logos, but all knowledge proceeds from faith, as first principles are unprovable outside a systematic structure.

The third book written c. 199 AD-c. 201 AD covers asceticism. He discusses marriage, which is treated similarly in the Paedagogus. Clement rejects the Gnostic opposition to marriage, arguing that only men who are uninterested in women should remain celibate, and that sex is a positive good if performed within marriage for the purposes of procreation. However it has not always been so: the Fall occurred because Adam and Eve succumbed to their desire for each other, and copulated before the allotted time. He argues against the idea that Christians should reject their family for an ascetic life, which stems from Luke 14:25–27, contending that Jesus would not have contradicted the precept to "Honour thy Father and thy Mother" (Exodus 20:12), one of the Ten Commandments. Clement concludes that asceticism will only be rewarded if the motivation is Christian in nature, and thus the asceticism of non-Christians such as the gymnosophists is pointless.

Clement begins the fourth book written c. 199 AD-c. 201 AD with a belated explanation of the disorganized nature of the work, and gives a brief description of his aims for the remaining three or four books. The fourth book focuses on martyrdom. While all good Christians should be unafraid of death, Clement condemns those who actively seek out a martyr's death, arguing that they do not have sufficient respect for God's gift of life. He is ambivalent whether any believing Christian can become a martyr by virtue of the manner of their death, or whether martyrdom is reserved for those who have lived exceptional lives. Marcionites cannot become martyrs, because they do not believe in the divinity of God the Father – their sufferings are in vain. There is then a digression to the subject of theological epistemology. According to Clement, there is no way of empirically testing the existence of God the Father, because the Logos has revelatory, not analysable meaning, although Christ was an object of the senses. God had no beginning, and is the universal first principle.

The fifth book written c. 199 AD-c. 201 AD returns to the subject of faith. Clement argues that truth, justice and goodness can be seen only by the mind, not the eye; faith is a way of accessing the unseeable. He stresses that knowledge of God can only be achieved through faith once one's moral faults have been corrected. This parallels Clement's earlier insistence that martyrdom can only be achieved by those who practice their faith in Christ through good deeds, not those who simply profess their faith. God transcends matter entirely, and thus the materialist cannot truly come to know God. Although Christ was God incarnate, it is our spiritual, not physical comprehension of him which is important.

In the beginning of the sixth book written c. 203 AD, Clement intends to demonstrate that the works of Greek poets were derived from the prophetic books of the Bible. In order to reinforce his position that the Greeks were inclined towards plagiarism, he cites numerous instances of such inappropriate appropriation by classical Greek writers, reported second-hand from On Plagiarism, an anonymous 3rd century BC work sometimes ascribed to Aretades. Clement then digresses to the subject of sin and hell, arguing that Adam was not perfect when created, but given the potential to achieve perfection. He espouses broadly universalist doctrine, holding that Christ's promise of salvation is available to all, even those condemned to hell.

The final extant book written c. 203 AD begins with a description of the nature of Christ, and that of the true Christian, who aims to be as similar as possible to both the Father and the Son. Clement then criticizes the simplistic anthropomorphism of most ancient religions, quoting Xenophanes' famous description of African, Thracian and Egyptian deities. The Greek gods may also have had their origins in the personification of material objects: Ares representing iron, and Dionysus wine. Prayer, and the relationship between love and knowledge are then discussed. 1 Corinthians 13:8 seems to contradict the characterization of the true Christian as one who knows; but to Clement, knowledge vanishes only in that it is subsumed by the universal love expressed by the Christian in his reverence for his Creator. Following Socrates, he argues that vice arises from a state of ignorance, not from intention. The Christian is a "laborer in God's vineyard", responsible both for his own path to salvation and that of his neighbor. The work ends with an extended passage against the contemporary divisions and heresies within the church.

== Question of the eighth book ==
Clement intended to make but one book of this; at least seven grew out of it, without his having treated all the subjects proposed. The absence of certain things definitely promised has led scholars to ask whether he wrote an eighth book, as would appear from Eusebius (VI. xiii. 1) and the Florilegia, and various attempts have been made to identify short or fragmentary treatises of his work that may have been part of this book. Photius, writing in the 9th century, found various texts appended to manuscripts of the seven canonical books, which led Daniel Heinsius (1580–1655) to suggest that the original eighth book is lost, and he identified the text purported to be from the eighth book as fragments of the Hypotyposes.

In any case the "excerpts" and "selections", which, with part of a treatise on logical method, are designated as the eighth book of the Stromateis in a single 11th-century manuscript, are not parts of the Hypotyposes, which Clement is known to have written. This work was a brief commentary on selected passages covering the whole Bible, as is shown in the fragments preserved by Oecumenius and in the Latin version of the commentary on the Catholic Epistles made at the instance of Cassiodorus.

== Quotes ==
"And when [God] says, 'Be not much with a strange woman,' He admonishes us to use indeed, but not to linger and spend time with, secular culture."

"Wisdom is therefore queen of philosophy, as philosophy is of preparatory culture. For if philosophy professes control of the tongue, and the belly, and the parts below the belly, it is to be chosen on its own account. But it appears more worthy of respect and pre-eminence, if cultivated for the honour and knowledge of God."

"Thus philosophy, a thing of the highest utility, flourished in antiquity among the barbarians, shedding its light over the nations. And afterwards it came to Greece. First in its ranks were the prophets of the Egyptians; and the Chaldeans among the Assyrians; and the druids among the Gauls; and the Samanaeans among the Bactrians; and the philosophers of the Celts; and the Magi of the Persians, who foretold the Saviour's birth, and came into the land of Judaea guided by a star. The Indian gymnosophists are also in the number, and the other barbarian philosophers. And of these there are two classes, some of them called Sarmanae, and others Brahmins. And those of the Sarmanae who are called Hylobii neither inhabit cities, nor have roofs over them, but are clothed in the bark of trees, feed on nuts, and drink water in their hands. Like those called Encratites in the present day, they know not marriage nor begetting of children. Some, too, of the Indians obey the precepts of Buddha; whom, on account of his extraordinary sanctity, they have raised to divine honours."
