= Praxagoras of Athens =

Early 4th century Greek historian

Praxagoras of Athens was a pagan historian in the early 4th century AD.

He was born in Athens and wrote three historical works, which are all lost: a history of the Kings of Athens, a history of Alexander the Great, and a panegyric biography of the emperor Constantine. A few fragments of the biography of Constantine are preserved in the Bibliotheca of Photius (cod. 62).

Dindorf's 1870 Minor Greek Historians Praxagoras' fragments start on page 438.

== Bibliography ==
- Andrea Basile: Propaganda costantiniana e cultura ellenica in Prassagora di Atene, dissert. Università Cattolica del Sacro Cuore, Milano 1990/91.
- Pawel Janiszewski: The Missing Link. Greek Pagan Historiography in the Second Half of the Third Century and in the Fourth Century AD., Warsaw 2006.
- Johannes Wienand, Carlo Scardino: (C 1) Praxagoras. In: Bruno Bleckmann, Carlo Scardino: Panegyrische Zeitgeschichte des 4. und 5. Jahrhunderts. Mit einem Beitrag von Johannes Wienand. Paderborn 2023, pp. 13–88, ISBN 978-3-506-79045-3 doi:10.30965/9783657790456_003.
