= Andronicianus =

Andronicianus (Ancient Greek: Ἀνδρονικιανός) was an orthodox Christian philosopher of classical antiquity. He wrote two books critical of Eunomius of Cyzicus (of whom Andronicianus is believed to be a contemporary) and his devotion to Arianism. One book was titled Against the Eunomians; the title of the other is now lost. Nothing more is known of him.
