= Amyntianus =

Ancient Greek writer

Amyntianus (Ancient Greek: Ἀμυντιανός) was the author of a work on Alexander the Great, which was dedicated to the Roman emperor Marcus Aurelius, the style of which Photios I of Constantinople thought disparagingly of. He also wrote the life of Olympias, the mother of Alexander, and a few other biographies. The Scholiast on Pindar refers to a work of Amyntianus on elephants.
