= Eusebius of Emesa =

Greek Christian theologian, 300–360

Eusebius of Emesa (Greek: Εὐσέβιος; c. 300 – c. 360) was a learned Christian cleric of the Greek church, and a pupil of Eusebius of Caesarea. He was born in Edessa (in today's southeastern Turkey) and became the bishop of Emesa (in today's Syria). The Latin form of his name is Eusebius Emesenus.

After receiving his early education in his native town, he studied theology at Caesarea in Palestine and Antioch, and philosophy and science at Alexandria. Among his teachers were Eusebius of Caesarea and Patrophilus of Scythopolis.

Jerome praised his eloquence in De Viris Illustribus, comparing him favourably to Diodorus of Tarsus. The reputation he acquired for learning and eloquence led to his being offered the see of Alexandria in succession to the deposed Athanasius at the beginning of 339, but he declined, and the council of Antioch chose Gregory of Cappadocia, "a fitter agent for the rough work to be done." Eusebius accepted the small bishopric of Emesa (the modern Homs), but his powers as mathematician and astronomer led his flock to accuse him of practising sorcery, and he had to flee to Laodicea (the modern Latakia). A reconciliation was effected by the patriarch of Antioch, but tradition says that Eusebius finally resigned his charge and lived a studious life in Antioch.

His fame as an astrologer commended him to the notice of the Roman emperor Constantius II, with whom he became a great favourite, accompanying him on many of his expeditions. The theological sympathies of Eusebius were with the semi-Arian party, but his interest in the controversy was not strong. His life was written by his friend George of Laodicea. He was a man of extraordinary learning, great eloquence and considerable intellectual power, but of his numerous writings only a few fragments are now in existence.

A considerable number of his sermons are extant, although they have not always been recognised as his work. Butyaert discovered a manuscript at Troyes in 1914 containing a Latin translation of some sermons. A collection also exists in Armenian, combined with some sermons of Severian of Gabala.

== Literature ==
- Eusebius of Emesa, A sermon on the sufferings and death of our Lord - English translation of a sermon from Armenian from 1859.
- Eusebius of Emesa, A sermon on Repentance - English translation.
- Eranistes, Impassible: Dialogue Three - cites within On free will, the will of Paul, and the Lord's passion, in English translation
- Henry Wace, Dictionary of Christian Biography to the end of the Sixth Century - article on Eusebius Emesenus.
- Robert E. Winn Eusebius of Emesa: Church and Theology in the Mid-Fourth Century Catholic University of America Press (2011)
