= Eunomius of Cyzicus =

Anatolian Christian bishop (died c. 393 AD)

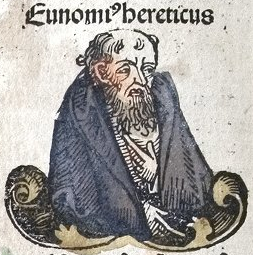
From the Nuremberg Chronicle

Eunomius /juːˈnoʊmiəs/ (Greek: Εὐνόμιος Κυζίκου) (died c. 393 AD), one of the leaders of the extreme or "anomoean" Arians, who are sometimes accordingly called Eunomians, was born at Dacora in Cappadocia or at Corniaspa in Pontus. early in the 4th century.

He studied theology at Alexandria under Aetius, and afterwards came under the influence of Eudoxius of Antioch, who ordained him deacon. On the recommendation of Eudoxius, Eunomius was appointed bishop of Cyzicus in 360. Here his free utterance of extreme Arian views led to popular complaints, including those from a number of contemporary writers such as Andronicianus. Eudoxius was compelled, by command of the emperor, Constantius II, to depose Eunomius from the bishopric within a year of his elevation to it.

During the reigns of Julian and Jovian, Eunomius resided in Constantinople in close intercourse with Aetius, consolidating a dissenting party and consecrating bishops. He then went to live at Chalcedon, whence in 367 he was banished to Mauretania for harbouring the rebel Procopius. He was recalled, however, before he reached his destination.

== The Confession of Eunomius ==
In 383, the emperor Theodosius, who had demanded a declaration of faith from all party leaders, punished Eunomius for continuing to teach his distinctive doctrines, by banishing him to Halmyris in Scythia Minor. He afterwards resided at Chalcedon and at Caesarea in Cappadocia, from which he was expelled by the inhabitants for writing against their bishop Basil. His last days were spent at his birthplace Dacora, where he died about 393.

The Confession is a short work (~1,500 words) in which he professes his faith (which was heresy under the Nicene Creed of 381). It was written immediately prior to the reaffirmation of the Nicene canon on 25 July, 383.

[2] We believe in 'the one and only true God' ... reverencing him as he really is: both by nature and in glory 'one God', beginninglessly, everlastingly, unendingly 'only'.

[3] We also believe in 'the Son of God' 'the only begotten God', 'the first born of all creation' ...

[4] After him we believe in 'the Counsellor, the Spirit of truth', the teacher of godliness: he was brought forth by the Only God through the Only begotten and was made subject to him ...

[5] After these things, we also believe in the resurrection to be brought about through the Saviour ...

His writings were held in high reputation by his party and their influence was so much dreaded by the orthodox, that several imperial edicts were issued for their destruction. Consequently, his commentary on the Epistle to the Romans, mentioned by the historian, Socrates Scholasticus and his epistles, mentioned by Philostorgius and Photius, are no longer extant.

== The Apologies ==
His first apologetical work, written probably about 360 or 365, was entirely recovered from the famous refutation of it by Basil of Caesarea. A second apology, written before 379 exists only in the quotations given from it in a refutation by Gregory of Nyssa. The exposition of faith, called forth by the demand of Theodosius for the "council of heresies" in 383, is still extant, and was edited by Valesius in his notes to Socrates of Constantinople, and by Ch. H. G. Rettberg in his Marcelliana.

The first Apology is a longer work (~6,000 words) that contains not only a defense of his faith but a lively criticism of his Trinitarian formula adversaries. It was written in 360 or 361 It was widely distributed and shared among all Christians. It is not everywhere persuasive but it is a cogent expression of the Arian 'formula' (represented by Eunomius). Ostensibly, it is structured around the Father, the Son, and the Spirit but it can be interpreted as an epistle (e.g., First Epistle to Timothy, Epistle to the Romans, etc.) followed by liturgy to be used in services (i.e., the final confession in the Apology).

[6] We shall try, therefore, so far as we can, to make the opinion we hold with regard to these arguments explicit: either we shall first set out the text of the profession and then disclose its meaning, or, after setting out the reasoning, we shall then relate it to the verbal expressions of the text. No distortion of the truth will result from the interchange of order, for these approaches are clearly both sufficient, not only for our own defence, but also for the refutation of our accusers.

His heresy was to assume that God was indivisible and infinite (contrary to the Nicene faith that the Father, the Son and the Spirit are of the same 'essence' and that the Trinity forms the single 'essence' of the indivisible and infinite).

[7] ... God is one, and that he was brought into being neither by his own action nor by that of any other ... God neither existed before himself nor did anything exist before him, but that he is before all things ... the Unbegotten, or rather, that he is unbegotten essence.

[8] ... 'the Unbegotten' is based neither on invention nor on privation, and is not applied to a part of him only (for he is without parts) and does not exist within him as something separate (for he is simple and uncompounded), and is not something different alongside him (for he is one and only he is unbegotten), then 'Unbegotten' must always be unbegotten essence.

[10] .. It is not only impious, then, it is positively ridiculous for those who grant that there is one unique unbegotten being to say that anything else exists either before it or along with it.

His apology leads to another heresy that the Son came into existence as a 'thing made' by God.

[12] As for showing that the Son too is one, being only begotten, we could rid ourselves of all care and trouble in that regard simply by quoting the words of the saints in which they proclaim the Son to be both 'offspring' and 'thing made'. ... We assert, therefore, that his essence was begotten – not having been in existence prior to its own coming to be – and that it exists, having been begotten before all things by the will of God and Father.

[13] .. If it is false, [you] will doubtless admit the necessity of accepting the opposite to be true: that the Son was begotten when he was already in existence. Now that would be not only the ultimate in absurdity or blasphemy, it would be completely ridiculous as well. ... If he existed before his begetting, he would be unbegotten ...

He carefully examines the semantics of 'the Father' and 'the Son' under many interpretations and then concludes his discussion of the Son with ...

[21] .. we confess that the Lord Jesus is himself 'Only begotten God', immortal and deathless, wise, good; but we say too the Father is the cause of his actual existence and of all that he is, for the Father, being unbegotten, has no cause of his essence or goodness.

He continues with the Spirit. The explanation here is almost absent but his heresy is expressed clearly.

[26] .. our Lord Jesus Christ, through whom all things were made, the image and seal of his own power and action. This Only-begotten God is not to be compared either with the one who begot him or with the Holy Spirit who was made through him, for he is less than the one in being a 'thing made', and greater than the other in being the maker.

[26] .. we confess that only the Son was begotten of the Father and that he is subject to him both in essence and in will ... [and] ... [27] makes use of the Counsellor as his servant for the sanctification, instruction, and assurance of believers.

And he begs for reason ...

[27] .. we beseech not only those who are present, but all who have shared with us in the same sacraments: don't be afraid of human censure; don't be deceived by their sophistries or led astray by their flatteries. Give a true and just verdict on the issues of which we have spoken; show the better part has clearly won out among you all. ... [I]f, because the majority have agreed to a lie and fought against the truth, preferring their present safety and reputation to what is pleasing to God and commonly reckoned fitting ... I beseech my own followers, at least, to preserve the faith ...

He ends the Apology with the offering of another confession (which is without surprise).

A second supposed Apology has been titled "An Apology for the Apology" and is entirely a reconstruction of a text from the commentaries of other writers (e.g., Gregory of Nyssa, Basil of Caesarea, etc.); a text for which there is no copy.

The teaching of the Anomoean school, led by Aetius and Eunomius, starting from the conception of God as Creator, argued that between the Creator and created there could be no essential, but at best only a moral, resemblance. "As the Unbegotten, God is an absolutely simple being; an act of generation would involve a contradiction of His essence by introducing duality into the Godhead." According to Socrates of Constantinople (24) and Theodoretos Kyrou (PG 83 420), Eunomius carried his views to a practical issue by altering the baptismal formula. Instead of baptizing in the name of the Trinity by immersing the person in water thrice, he baptized in the death of Christ with only one immersion. This alteration was regarded by the orthodox as so serious that Eunomians on returning to the church were rebaptized, though the Arians were not. The Eunomian heresy was formally condemned by the Council of Constantinople in 381. The sect maintained a separate existence for some time, but gradually fell away owing to internal divisions.

After Eunomius died, Eutropius ordered that Eunomius's body be moved to Tyana and his books be burned.

== See also ==
- Christ Pantocrator
- Christology

== Bibliography ==
- Richard Paul Vaggione (ed.), Eunomius, The Extant Works, New York, Oxford University Press 1987. [Text is presented with Greek on even pages and English on odd pages]
- Richard Paul Vaggione, Eunomius of Cyzicus and the Nicene Revolution, New York, Oxford University Press 2000.
