= Aretades of Cnidus =

Ancient Greek historian

Aretades of Cnidus (Greek: Ἀρητάδης ὁ Κνίδιος) was an ancient Greek historian from the city of Cnidus. He wrote a work on the history of Macedon (Greek: Μακεδονικά) in three books at least, and another on the history of various Greek islands (Greek: Νησιωτικά) in two books at least. It is uncertain whether the particular Aretades referred to by Porphyry as the author of a work Peri Sumptoseos (Greek: Περί συμπτώσεως), is the same as Aretades of Cnidus or not.
