= Protrepticus (Clement) =

2nd century work of Clement of Alexandria

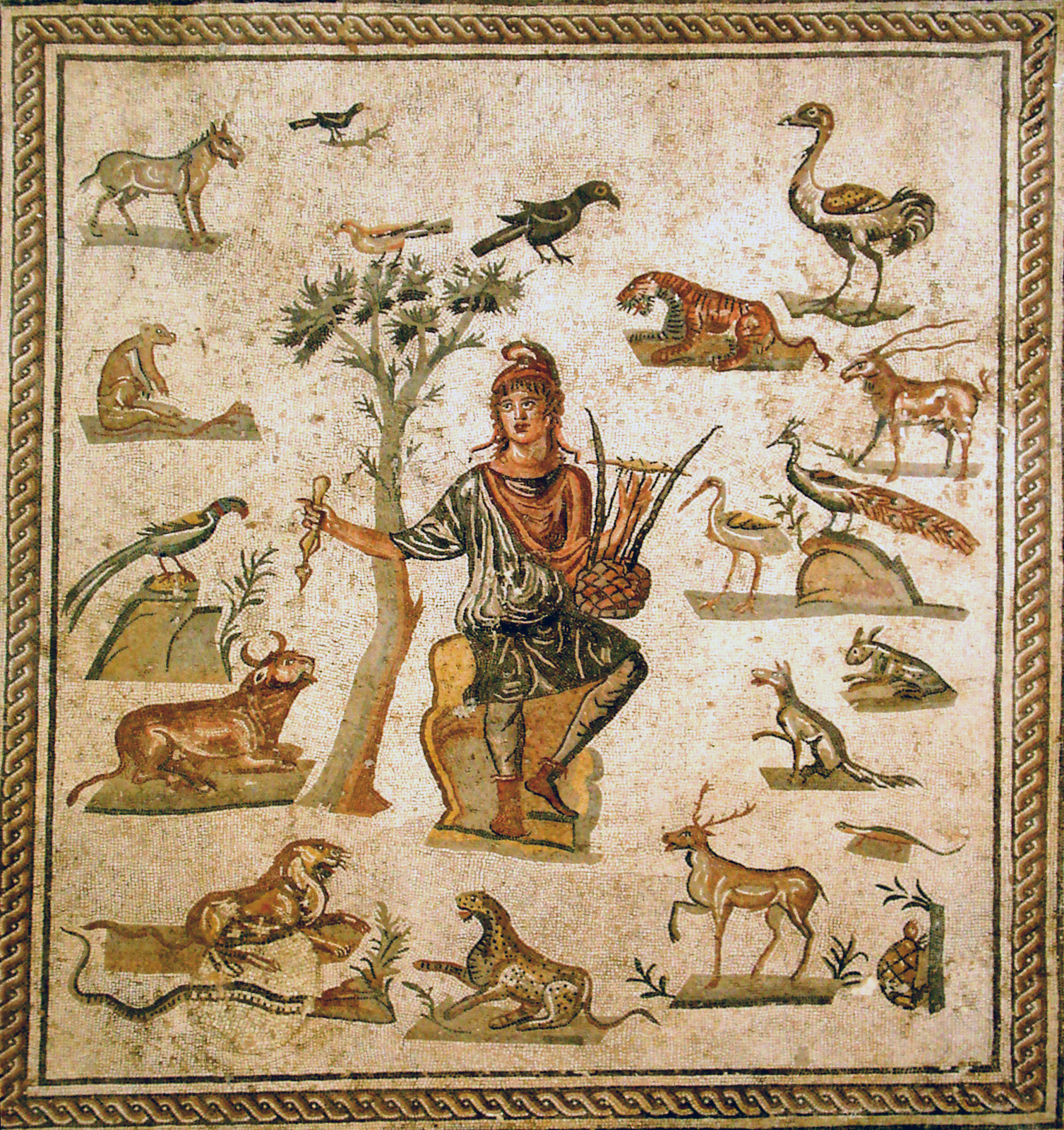
The Orphic mysteries are used as an example of the false cults of Greek paganism in the Protrepticus.

The Protrepticus (Greek: Προτρεπτικὸς πρὸς Ἕλληνας: "Exhortation to the Greeks") is the first of the three surviving works of Clement of Alexandria, a Christian theologian of the 2nd century.

== Description ==
The work is, as its title suggests, an exhortation to the pagans of Greece to adopt Christianity, and within it Clement demonstrates his extensive knowledge of pagan mythology and theology. It is chiefly important due to Clement's exposition of religion as an anthropological phenomenon. After a short philosophical discussion, it opens with a history of Greek religion in seven stages. Clement suggests that at first, men mistakenly believed the Sun, the Moon and other heavenly bodies to be gods. The next development was the worship of the products of agriculture, from which he contends the cults of Demeter and Dionysus arose. Man then paid reverence to revenge, and deified human feelings of love and fear, among others. In the following stage, the poets Hesiod and Homer attempt to enumerate the Gods; Hesiod's Theogony giving the number of twelve. Finally, men proclaimed other men, such as Asclepius and Heracles, deities. Discussing idolatry, Clement contends that the objects of primitive religion were unshaped wood and stone, and idols thus arose when such natural items were carved. Following Plato, Clement is critical of all forms of visual art, suggesting that artworks are but illusions and "deadly toys".

Clement criticizes Greek paganism in the Protrepticus on the basis that its deities are both false and poor moral examples, and he attacks the mystery religions for their obscurantism and trivial rituals. In particular, the worshippers of Dionysus are ridiculed for their ritual use of children's toys. He suggests at some points that the pagan deities are based on humans, but at others that they are misanthropic demons, and he cites several classical sources in support of this second hypothesis. Clement, like many pre-Nicene fathers, writes favourably about Euhemerus and other rationalist philosophers, on the grounds that they at least saw the flaws in paganism. However, his greatest praise is reserved for Plato, whose apophatic views of God prefigure Christianity.

The figure of Orpheus is prominent throughout the narrative, and Clement contrasts his song, representing pagan superstition, with the divine Logos of Christ. According to Clement, through conversion to Christianity alone can man fully participate in the Logos, which is universal truth.

== See also ==
- Protrepsis and paraenesis
