= Philostorgius =

Byzantine Church historian (368 – c.439)

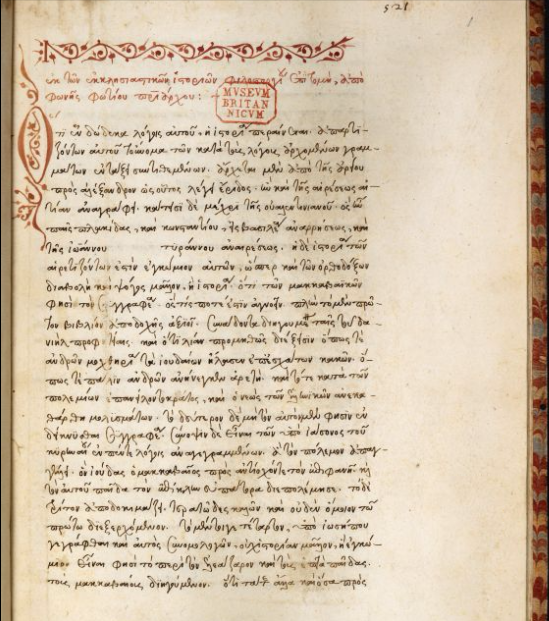
Epitome of Philostorgius' Church History by Photios I of Constantinople (British Library, 16th-century manuscript)

Philostorgius (Ancient Greek: Φιλοστόργιος; 368 – c. 439 AD) was an Anomoean Church historian of the 4th and 5th centuries.

Very little information about his life is available. He was born in Borissus, Cappadocia to Eulampia and Carterius, and lived in Constantinople from the age of twenty. He is said to have come from an Arian family, and in Constantinople soon attached himself to Eunomius of Cyzicus, who received much praise from Philostorgius in his work.

He wrote a history of the Arian controversy titled Church History (Ἐκκλησιαστικὴ ἱστορία, Ekklēsiastikē Historia). Philostorgius' original appeared between 425 and 433, in other words, slightly earlier than the History of Socrates of Constantinople, and was formed in twelve volumes bound in two books. The original is now lost. However, the ninth-century historian Photius found a copy in his library in Constantinople, and wrote an epitome of it. Others also borrowed from Philostorgius, most notably the author of the Artemii Passio (Artemius being a legendary martyr under Julian the Apostate), and so, despite the eventual disappearance of the original text, it is possible to form some idea of what it contained by reviewing the epitome and other references. This reconstruction of what might have been in the text was first published, in German, by the Belgian philologist Joseph Bidez in 1913; a third, revised edition of his work undertaken by Friedhelm Winkelmann was published in 1981; this edition has recently been translated into English by Philip R. Amidon.

He also wrote a treatise against Porphyry, which is completely lost.

== Value ==
Philostorgius' account of the emperor Constantine I's death is not corroborated by any other extant source. He reports that Constantine was poisoned by his family members and subsequently avenged by his son Constantius II, who is portrayed sympathetically by Philostorgius. Other historians say that Constantius instigated of the murders of his male relatives following Constantine's death, but only in Philostorgius' version are the murders justified.

Philostorgius' tale must be false, since Constantius' "official version" denied any involvement in the murders, calling his relatives the innocent victims of an army mutiny. Varying suggestions have been given for the origins of this rumor. Burgess believed it was a later invention when Constantius' role in the murders could no longer be plausibly denied, while Crawford thought it was used to motivate the soldiers to murder Constantius' relatives.

In other cases, however, what Philostorgius says is consistent with what other sources say. For instance, Ammianus Marcellinus' statement that Gratian supervised the education of his younger brother Valentinian II lines up with Philostorgius, who disliked Gratian but admits that he "discharged the duty of a father" towards Valentinian.

== Editions ==
- Bruno Bleckmann, Markus Stein (ed.): Philostorgios Kirchengeschichte (= Kleine und fragmentarische Historiker der Spätantike E 7). 2 vols. Ferdinand Schöningh, Paderborn 2015, ISBN 978-3-506-78199-4.
- Philostorgius, Kirchengeschichte. Mit dem Leben des Lucian von Antiochien und den Fragmenten eines arianischen Historiographen, edited by Joseph Bidez and revised by Friedhelm Winkelmann, GCS (Berlin: Akademie-Verlag, 1981).
- Philostorgius Church History, editor and translator Philip R. Amidon, S.J. (Atlanta: Society of Biblical Literature, 2007).
- Photios, Epitome of the Ecclesiastical History of Philostorgius, tr Edward Walford, (London: Henry G. Bonn, 1855)

== Sources ==
- Burgess, R.W. (2008). "THE SUMMER OF BLOOD: The "Great Massacre" of 337 and the Promotion of the Sons of Constantine". Dumbarton Oaks Papers. 62: 5–51. JSTOR 20788042.
- Crawford, Peter (2016). Constantius II: Usurpers, Eunuchs, and the Antichrist. Pen & Sword. ISBN 978-1-78340-055-3.
- Hunt, David (1998). "The successors of Constantine". In Averil Cameron & Peter Garnsey (eds.). The Cambridge Ancient History XIII: The Late Empire, A.D. 337–425. Cambridge University Press. ISBN 0-521-30200-5.
- Hughes, Ian (5 August 2013). Imperial Brothers: Valentinian, Valens and the Disaster at Adrianople. Pen and Sword. ISBN 978-1-4738-2863-6.
- McLynn, Neil B. (1994), Ambrose of Milan: Church and Court in a Christian Capital, The Transformation of the Classical Heritage, vol. 22, Berkeley: University of California Press, ISBN 978-0-520-08461-2
