= Christian theology =

Study of Christian belief and practice

Christian theology is the theology – the systematic study of the divine and religion – of Christian belief and practice. It concentrates primarily upon the texts of the Old Testament and of the New Testament, as well as on Christian tradition. Christian theologians use biblical exegesis, rational analysis and argument. Theologians may undertake the study of Christian theology for a variety of reasons, such as in order to:

- help them better understand Christian tenets
- make comparisons between Christianity and other traditions
- defend Christianity against objections and criticism
- facilitate reforms in the Christian church
- assist in the propagation of Christianity
- draw on the resources of the Christian tradition to address some present situation or perceived need
- education in Christian philosophy, especially in Neoplatonic philosophy

== Christian traditions ==
Christian theology varies significantly across the main branches of Christian tradition: Catholic, Orthodox and Protestant. Each of those traditions has its own unique approaches to seminaries and ministerial formation.

== Hermeneutics: the Bible ==
=== Biblical revelation ===
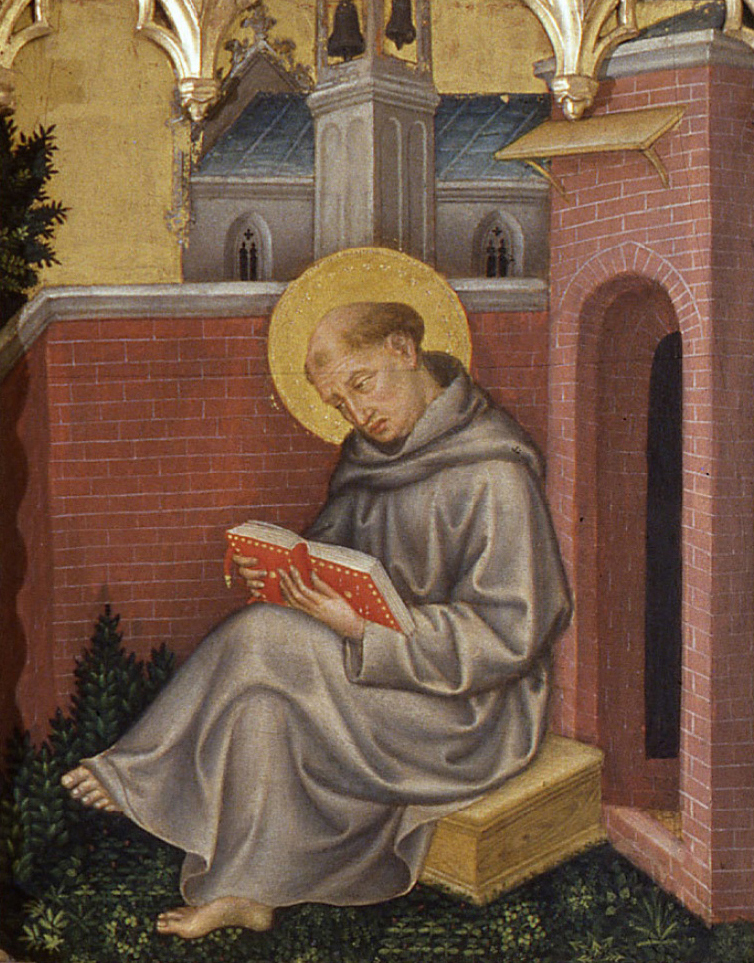
Thomas Aquinas from Valle Romita Polyptych by Gentile da Fabriano

Revelation is the revealing or disclosing, or making something obvious through active or passive communication with God, and can originate directly from God or through an agent, such as an angel. A person recognised as having experienced such contact is often called a prophet. Christianity generally considers the Bible as divinely or supernaturally revealed or inspired. Such revelation does not always require the presence of God or an angel. For instance, in the concept which Catholics call interior locution, supernatural revelation can include just an inner voice heard by the recipient.

Thomas Aquinas (1225–1274) first described two types of revelation in Christianity: general revelation and special revelation.

- General revelation occurs through observation of the created order. Such observations can logically lead to important conclusions, such as the existence of God and some of God's attributes. General revelation is also an element of Christian apologetics.
- Certain specifics, such as the Trinity and the Incarnation, as revealed in the teachings of the Scriptures, cannot otherwise be deduced except by special revelation.

=== Biblical inspiration ===
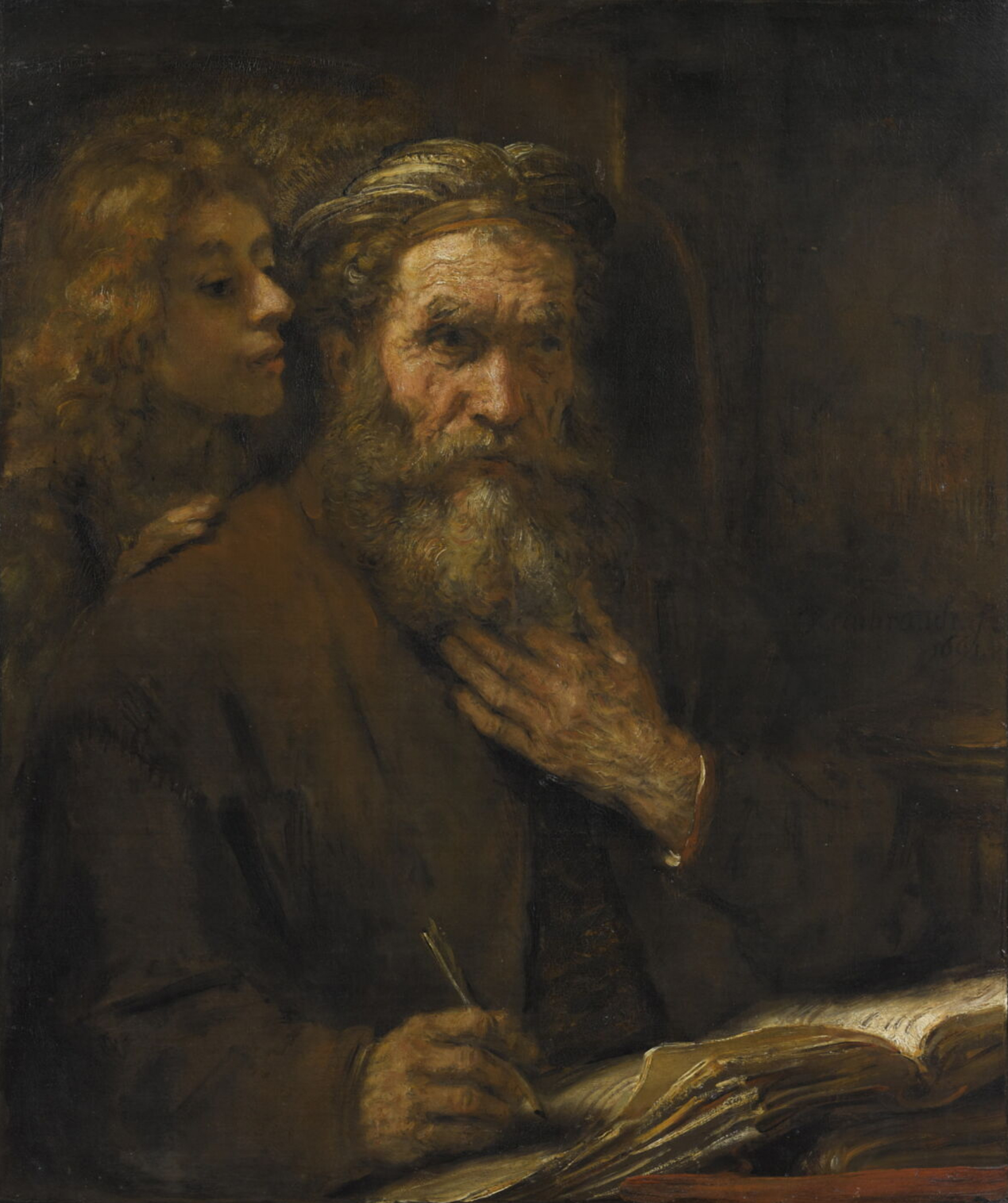
Rembrandt's The Evangelist Matthew Inspired by an Angel, 1661

The Bible contains many passages in which the authors claim divine inspiration for their message or report the effects of such inspiration on others. Besides the direct accounts of written revelation (such as Moses receiving the Ten Commandments inscribed on tablets of stone), the Prophets of the Old Testament frequently claimed that their message was of divine origin by prefacing the revelation using the following phrase: "Thus says the LORD" (for example, 1 Kgs 12:22–24;1 Chr 17:3–4; Jer 35:13; Ezek 2:4; Zech 7:9; etc.). The Second Epistle of Peter claims that "no prophecy of Scripture ... was ever produced by the will of man, but men spoke from God as they were carried along by the Holy Spirit" The Second Epistle of Peter also implies that Paul's writings are inspired (2 Pet 3:16).

Many Christians cite a verse in Paul's letter to Timothy, 2 Timothy 3:16–17, as evidence that "all scripture is given by inspiration of God, and is profitable ..." Here St. Paul is referring to the Old Testament, since the scriptures have been known by Timothy from "infancy" (verse 15). Others offer an alternative reading for the passage; for example, theologian C. H. Dodd suggests that it "is probably to be rendered" as: "Every inspired scripture is also useful..." A similar translation appears in the New English Bible, in the Revised English Bible, and (as a footnoted alternative) in the New Revised Standard Version. The Latin Vulgate can be so read. Yet others defend the "traditional" interpretation; Daniel B. Wallace calls the alternative "probably not the best translation."

Some modern English versions of the Bible renders theopneustos with "God-breathed" (NIV) or "breathed out by God" (ESV), avoiding the word inspiration, which has the Latin root inspīrāre – "to blow or breathe into".

=== Biblical authority ===
Christianity generally regards the agreed collections of books known as the Bible as authoritative and as written by human authors under the inspiration of the Holy Spirit. Some Christians believe that the Bible is inerrant (totally without error and free from contradiction, including the historical and scientific parts) or infallible (inerrant on issues of faith and practice but not necessarily on matters of history or science).

Some Christians infer that the Bible cannot both refer to itself as being divinely inspired and also be errant or fallible. For if the Bible were divinely inspired, then the source of inspiration being divine, would not be subject to fallibility or error in that which is produced. For them, the doctrines of the divine inspiration, infallibility, and inerrancy, are inseparably tied together. The idea of biblical integrity is a further concept of infallibility, by suggesting that current biblical text is complete and without error, and that the integrity of biblical text has never been corrupted or degraded. Historians note, or claim, that the doctrine of the Bible's infallibility was adopted hundreds of years after the books of the Bible were written.

The authority of the Bible can also be linked to the principle of sola scriptura, the claim that by scripture alone that the authority of the Bible is more important than the authority of the Church.

=== Biblical canon ===
The content of the Protestant Old Testament is the same as the Hebrew Bible canon, with changes in the division and order of books, but the Catholic Old Testament contains additional texts, known as the deuterocanonical books. Protestants recognize 39 books in their Old Testament canon, while Roman Catholic and Eastern Rite Catholics recognize 46 books as canonical. However, various Eastern Orthodox Churches have differing Old Testament canons. For example, Slavic traditions include the book of 2 Esdras in their biblical canons. Some churches, such as the Georgian Orthodox Church, deem the book of 4 Maccabees as "uncanonical", yet still include the book in the Bible; while others do not include the book at all. Eastern Orthodox, Catholics and Protestants use the same 27-book New Testament canon.

Early Christians used the Septuagint, a Koine Greek translation of the Hebrew scriptures. Christianity subsequently endorsed various additional writings that would become the New Testament. In the 4th century a series of synods, most notably the Synod of Hippo in AD 393, produced a list of texts equal to the 46-book canon of the Old Testament that Catholics use today (and the 27-book canon of the New Testament that all use). A definitive list did not come from any early ecumenical council. Around 400, Jerome produced the Vulgate, a definitive Latin edition of the Bible, the contents of which, at the insistence of the Bishop of Rome, accorded with the decisions of the earlier synods. This process effectively set the New Testament canon, although examples exist of other canonical lists in use after this time.

During the 16th-century Protestant Reformation certain reformers proposed different canonical lists of the Old Testament. The texts which appear in the Septuagint but not in the Jewish canon fell out of favor, and eventually disappeared from Protestant canons. Catholic Bibles classify these texts as deuterocanonical books, whereas Protestant contexts label them as the Apocrypha.

== Theology proper: God ==
In Christianity, God is the creator and preserver of the universe. God is presented as a father figure to humanity. God is the sole ultimate power in the universe but is distinct from it. The Bible never speaks of God as impersonal. Instead, it refers to him in personal terms – who speaks, sees, hears, acts, and loves. God is understood to have a will and personality and is an all powerful, divine and benevolent being. He is represented in Scripture as being primarily concerned with people and their salvation.

=== Attributes of God ===
==== Classification ====
Many Reformed theologians distinguish between the communicable attributes (those that human beings can also have) and the incommunicable attributes (those which belong to God alone).

==== Enumeration ====
Some attributes ascribed to God in Christian theology are:

- Aseity—That "God is so independent that he does not need us." It is based on Acts 17:25, where it says that God "is not served by human hands, as if he needed anything" (NIV). This is often related to God's self-existence and his self-sufficiency.
- Eternity—That God exists beyond the temporal realm.
- Graciousness—That God extends His favor and gifts to human beings unconditionally as well as conditionally.
- Holiness—That God is separate from sin and incorruptible. Noting the refrain of "Holy, holy, holy" in Isaiah 6:3 and Revelation 4:8,
- Immanence—That although God is transcendent and holy, He is also accessible and can be dynamically experienced.
- Immutability—That God's essential nature is unchangeable.
- Impassibility—That God does not experience emotion or suffering (a more controversial doctrine, disputed especially by open theism).
- Impeccability—That God is incapable of error (sin).
- Incorporeality—That God is without physical composition. A related concept is the spirituality of God, which is derived from Jesus' statement in John 4:24, "God is spirit."
- Love—That God is care and compassion. 1 John 4:16 says "God is love."
- Mission—That God is the supreme liberator. While the Mission of God is not traditionally included in this list, David Bosch has argued that "mission is not primarily an activity of the church, but an attribute of God."
- Omnibenevolence—That God is omnibenevolent. Omnibenevolence of God refers to him being "all good".
- Omnipotence—That God is supremely or all-powerful.
- Omnipresence—That God is the supreme being, existing everywhere and at all times; the all-perceiving or all-conceiving foundation of reality.
- Omniscience—That God is supremely or all-knowing.
- Oneness—That God is without peer, also that every divine attribute is instantiated in its entirety (the qualitative infinity of God). See also Monotheism and Divine simplicity.
- Providence—That God watches over His creation with interest and dedication. While the Providence of God usually refers to his activity in the world, it also implies his care for the universe, and is thus an attribute. A distinction is usually made between "general providence" which refers to God's continuous upholding the existence and natural order of the universe, and "special providence" which refers to God's extraordinary intervention in the life of people. See also Sovereignty.
- Righteousness—That God is the greatest or only measure of human conduct. The righteousness of God may refer to his holiness, to his justice, or to his saving activity through Christ.
- Transcendence—That God exists beyond the natural realm of physical laws and thus is not bound by them; He is also wholly Other and incomprehensible apart from general or special self-revelation.
- Triune—The Christian God is understood (by trinitarian Christians) to be a "threeness" of Father, Son, and Holy Spirit that is fully consistent with His "oneness"; a single infinite being who is both within and beyond nature. Because the persons of the Trinity represent a personal relation even on the level of God to Himself, He is personal both in His relation toward us and in His relation toward Himself.
- Veracity—That God is the Truth all human beings strive for; He is also impeccably honest. Titus 1:2 refers to "God, who does not lie."
- Wisdom—That God fully comprehends human nature and the world, and will see His will accomplished in heaven and on earth. Romans 16:27 speaks about the "only wise God".

==== Monotheism ====
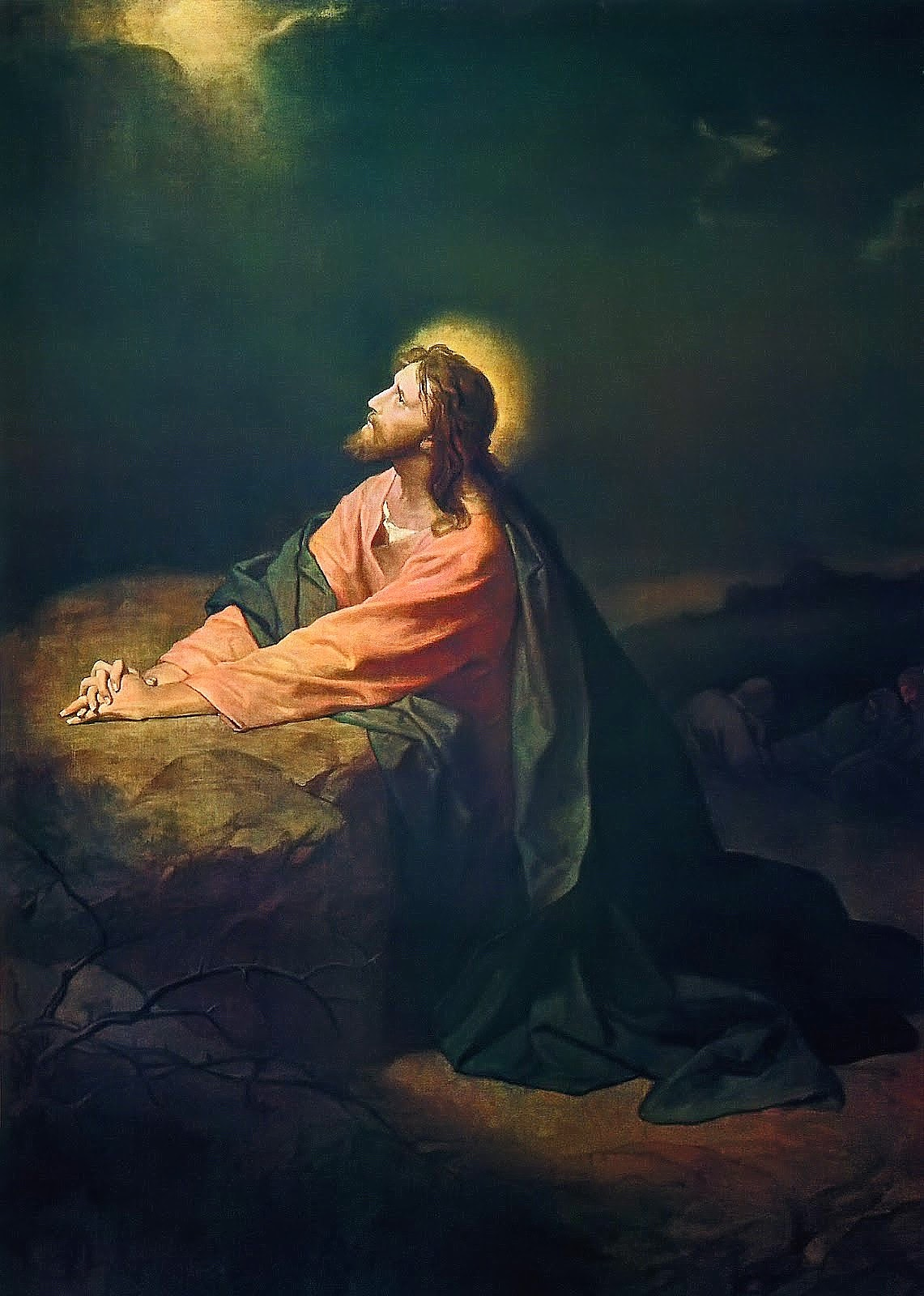
Christ in Gethsemane, Heinrich Hofmann, 1890

Some Christians believe that the God worshiped by the Hebrew people of the pre-Christian era had always revealed himself as he did through Jesus; but that this was never obvious until Jesus was born (see John 1). Also, though the Angel of the Lord spoke to the Patriarchs, revealing God to them, some believe it has always been only through the Spirit of God granting them understanding, that men have been able to perceive later that God himself had visited them.

This belief gradually developed into the modern formulation of the Trinity, which is the doctrine that God is a single entity (Yahweh), but that there is a trinity in God's single being, the meaning of which has always been debated. This mysterious "Trinity" has been described as hypostases in the Greek language (subsistences in Latin), and "persons" in English. Nonetheless, Christians stress that they only believe in one God.

Most Christian churches teach the Trinity, as opposed to Unitarian monotheistic beliefs. Historically, most Christian churches have taught that the nature of God is a mystery, something that must be revealed by special revelation rather than deduced through general revelation.

Christian orthodox traditions (Catholic, Eastern Orthodox, and Protestant) follow this idea, which was codified in 381 and reached its full development through the work of the Cappadocian Fathers. They consider God to be a triune entity, called the Trinity, comprising the three "Persons"; God the Father, God the Son, and God the Holy Spirit, described as being "of the same substance" (ὁμοούσιος). The true nature of an infinite God, however, is commonly described as beyond definition, and the word 'person' is an imperfect expression of the idea.

Some critics contend that because of the adoption of a tripartite conception of deity, Christianity is a form of tritheism or polytheism. This concept dates from Arian teachings which claimed that Jesus, having appeared later in the Bible than his Father, had to be a secondary, lesser, and therefore distinct god. For Jews and Muslims, the idea of God as a trinity is heretical– it is considered akin to polytheism. Christians overwhelmingly assert that monotheism is central to the Christian faith, as the very Nicene Creed (among others) which gives the orthodox Christian definition of the Trinity does begin with: "I believe in one God".

In the 3rd century, Tertullian claimed that God exists as the Father, the Son, and the Holy Spirit—the three personae of one and the same substance. To trinitarian Christians God the Father is not at all a separate god from God the Son (of whom Jesus is the incarnation) and the Holy Spirit, the other hypostases (Persons) of the Christian Godhead. According to the Nicene Creed, the Son (Jesus Christ) is "eternally begotten of the Father", indicating that their divine Father-Son relationship is not tied to an event within time or human history.

In Christianity, the doctrine of the Trinity states that God is one being who exists, simultaneously and eternally, as a mutual indwelling of three Persons: the Father, the Son (incarnate as Jesus), and the Holy Spirit (or Holy Ghost). Since earliest Christianity, one's salvation has been very closely related to the concept of a triune God, although the Trinitarian doctrine was not formalized until the 4th century. At that time, the Emperor Constantine convoked the First Council of Nicaea, to which all bishops of the empire were invited to attend. Pope Sylvester I did not attend but sent his legate. The council, among other things, decreed the original Nicene Creed.

==== Trinity ====
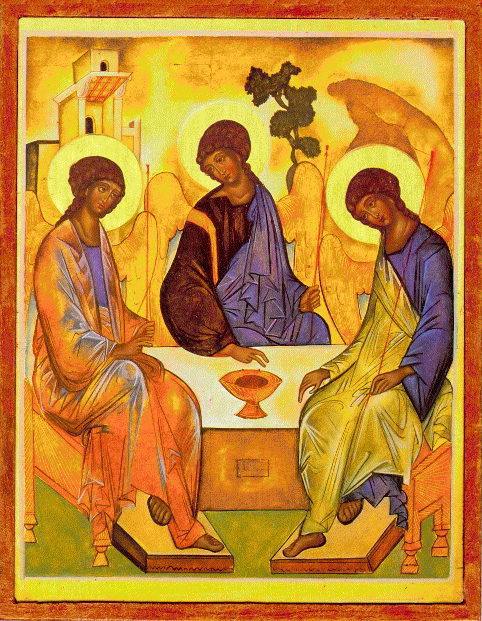
"Holy Trinity" from the Tretyakov Gallery, Moscow, by Andrei Rublev, c. 1400, but more properly known as the "Hospitality of Abraham". The three angels symbolize the Trinity.

For most Christians, beliefs about God are enshrined in the doctrine of Trinitarianism, which holds that the three persons of God together form a single God. The Trinitarian view emphasizes that God has a will and that God the Son has two wills, divine and human, though these are never in conflict (see Hypostatic union). However, this point is disputed by Oriental Orthodox Christians, who hold that God the Son has only one will of unified divinity and humanity (see Miaphysitism).

The Christian doctrine of the Trinity teaches the unity of Father, Son, and Holy Spirit as three persons in one Godhead. The doctrine states that God is the Triune God, existing as three persons, or in the Greek hypostases, but one being. Personhood in the Trinity does not match the common Western understanding of "person" as used in the English language—it does not imply an "individual, self-actualized center of free will and conscious activity." To the ancients, personhood "was in some sense individual, but always in community as well." Each person is understood as having the one identical essence or nature, not merely similar natures. Since the beginning of the 3rd century the doctrine of the Trinity has been stated as "the one God exists in three Persons and one substance, Father, Son, and Holy Spirit."

Trinitarianism, belief in the Trinity, is a mark of Catholicism, Eastern and Oriental Orthodoxy as well as other prominent Christian sects arising from the Protestant Reformation, such as Anglicanism, Methodism, Lutheranism, Baptist, and Presbyterianism. The Oxford Dictionary of the Christian Church describes the Trinity as "the central dogma of Christian theology". This doctrine contrasts with Nontrinitarian positions which include Unitarianism, Oneness and Modalism. A small minority of Christians hold non-trinitarian views, largely coming under the heading of Unitarianism.

Most, if not all, Christians believe that God is spirit, an uncreated, omnipotent, and eternal being, the creator and sustainer of all things, who works the redemption of the world through his Son, Jesus Christ. With this background, belief in the divinity of Christ and the Holy Spirit is expressed as the doctrine of the Trinity, which describes the single divine ousia (substance) existing as three distinct and inseparable hypostases (persons): the Father, the Son (Jesus Christ the Logos), and the Holy Spirit.

The Trinitarian doctrine is considered by most Christians to be a core tenet of their faith. Nontrinitarians typically hold that God, the Father, is supreme; that Jesus, although still divine Lord and Saviour, is the Son of God; and that the Holy Spirit is a phenomenon akin to God's will on Earth. The holy three are separate, yet the Son and the Holy Spirit are still seen as originating from God the Father.

The New Testament does not have the term "Trinity" and nowhere discusses the Trinity as such. Some emphasize, however, that the New Testament does repeatedly speak of the Father, the Son, and the Holy Spirit to "compel a trinitarian understanding of God." The doctrine developed from the biblical language used in New Testament passages such as the baptismal formula in Matthew 28:19 and by the end of the 4th century it was widely held in its present form.

=== God the Father ===
In many monotheist religions, God is addressed as the father, in part because of his active interest in human affairs, in the way that a father would take an interest in his children who are dependent on him and as a father, he will respond to humanity, his children, acting in their best interests. In Christianity, God is called "Father" in a more literal sense, besides being the creator and nurturer of creation, and the provider for his children. The Father is said to be in unique relationship with his only begotten (monogenes) son, Jesus Christ, which implies an exclusive and intimate familiarity: "No one knows the Son except the Father, and no one knows the Father except the Son and any one to whom the Son chooses to reveal him."

In Christianity, God the Father's relationship with humanity is as a father to children—in a previously unheard-of sense—and not just as the creator and nurturer of creation, and the provider for his children, his people. Thus, humans, in general, are sometimes called children of God. To Christians, God the Father's relationship with humanity is that of Creator and created beings, and in that respect he is the father of all. The New Testament says, in this sense, that the very idea of family, wherever it appears, derives its name from God the Father, and thus God himself is the model of the family.

However, there is a deeper "legal" sense in which Christians believe that they are made participants in the special relationship of Father and Son, through Jesus Christ as his spiritual bride. Christians call themselves adopted children of God.

In the New Testament, God the Father has a special role in his relationship with the person of the Son, where Jesus is believed to be his Son and his heir. According to the Nicene Creed, the Son (Jesus Christ) is "eternally begotten of the Father", indicating that their divine Father-Son relationship is not tied to an event within time or human history. See Christology. The Bible refers to Christ, called "The Word" as present at the beginning of God's creation., not a creation himself, but equal in the personhood of the Trinity.

In Eastern Orthodox theology, God the Father is the "principium" (beginning), the "source" or "origin" of both the Son and the Holy Spirit, which gives intuitive emphasis to the threeness of persons; by comparison, Western theology explains the "origin" of all three hypostases or persons as being in the divine nature, which gives intuitive emphasis to the oneness of God's being.

=== Christology and Christ ===
Christology is the field of study within Christian theology which is primarily concerned with the nature, person, and works of Jesus Christ, held by Christians to be the Son of God. Christology is concerned with the meeting of the human (Son of Man) and divine (God the Son or Word of God) in the person of Jesus.

Primary considerations include the Incarnation, the relationship of Jesus's nature and person with the nature and person of God, and the salvific work of Jesus. As such, Christology is generally less concerned with the details of Jesus's life (what he did) or teaching than with who or what he is. There have been and are various perspectives by those who claim to be his followers since the church began after his ascension. The controversies ultimately focused on whether and how a human nature and a divine nature can co-exist in one person. The study of the inter-relationship of these two natures is one of the preoccupations of the majority tradition.

Teachings about Jesus and testimonies about what he accomplished during his three-year public ministry are found throughout the New Testament. Core biblical teachings about the person of Jesus Christ may be summarized that Jesus Christ was and forever is fully God (divine) and fully human in one sinless person at the same time, and that through the death and resurrection of Jesus, sinful humans can be reconciled to God and thereby are offered salvation and the promise of eternal life via his New Covenant. While there have been theological disputes over the nature of Jesus, Christians believe that Jesus is God incarnate and "true God and true man" (or both fully divine and fully human). Jesus, having become fully human in all respects, suffered the pains and temptations of a mortal man, yet he did not sin. As fully God, he defeated death and rose to life again. Scripture asserts that Jesus was conceived, by the Holy Spirit, and born of his virgin mother Mary without a human father. The biblical accounts of Jesus's ministry include miracles, preaching, teaching, healing, Death, and resurrection. The apostle Peter, in what has become a famous proclamation of faith among Christians since the 1st century, said, "You are the Christ, the Son of the living God." Most Christians now wait for the Second Coming of Christ when they believe he will fulfill the remaining Messianic prophecies.

==== Christ ====
Christ is the English term for the Greek Χριστός (Khristós) meaning "the anointed one". It is a translation of the Hebrew מָשִׁיחַ (Māšîaḥ), usually transliterated into English as Messiah. The word is often misunderstood to be the surname of Jesus due to the numerous mentions of Jesus Christ in the Christian Bible. The word is in fact used as a title, hence its common reciprocal use Christ Jesus, meaning Jesus the Anointed One or Jesus the Messiah. Followers of Jesus became known as Christians because they believed that Jesus was the Christ, or Messiah, prophesied about in the Old Testament, or Tanakh.

==== Trinitarian ecumenical councils ====
The Christological controversies came to a head over the persons of the Godhead and their relationship with one another. Christology was a fundamental concern from the First Council of Nicaea (325) until the Third Council of Constantinople (680). In this time period, the Christological views of various groups within the broader Christian community led to accusations of heresy, and, infrequently, subsequent religious persecution. In some cases, a sect's unique Christology is its chief distinctive feature, in these cases it is common for the sect to be known by the name given to its Christology.

The decisions made at First Council of Nicaea and re-ratified at the First Council of Constantinople, after several decades of ongoing controversy during which the work of Athanasius and the Cappadocian Fathers were influential. The language used was that the one God exists in three persons (Father, Son, and Holy Spirit); in particular it was affirmed that the Son was homoousios (of one substance) with the Father. The Creed of the Nicene Council made statements about the full divinity and full humanity of Jesus, thus preparing the way for discussion about how exactly the divine and human come together in the person of Christ (Christology).

Nicaea insisted that Jesus was fully divine and also human. What it did not do was make clear how one person could be both divine and human, and how the divine and human were related within that one person. This led to the Christological controversies of the 4th and 5th centuries of the Christian era.

The Chalcedonian Creed did not put an end to all Christological debate, but it did clarify the terms used and became a point of reference for all other Christologies. Most of the major branches of Christianity—Catholicism, Eastern Orthodoxy, Anglicanism, Lutheranism, and Reformed—subscribe to the Chalcedonian Christological formulation, while many branches of Eastern Christianity—Syrian Orthodoxy, Assyrian Church, Coptic Orthodoxy, Ethiopian Orthodoxy, and Armenian Apostolicism—reject it.

==== Attributes of Christ ====
===== God as Son =====
According to the Bible, the second Person of the Trinity, because of his eternal relation to the first Person (God as Father), is the Son of God. He is considered (by Trinitarians) to be coequal with the Father and Holy Spirit. He is all God and all human: the Son of God as to his divine nature, while as to his human nature he is from the lineage of David. The core of Jesus's self-interpretation was his "filial consciousness", his relationship to God as child to parent in some unique sense (see Filioque controversy). His mission on earth proved to be that of enabling people to know God as their Father, which Christians believe is the essence of eternal life.

God the Son is the second person of the Trinity in Christian theology. The doctrine of the Trinity identifies Jesus of Nazareth as God the Son, united in essence but distinct in person with regard to God the Father and God the Holy Spirit (the first and third persons of the Trinity). God the Son is co-eternal with God the Father (and the Holy Spirit), both before Creation and after the End (see Eschatology). So Jesus was always "God the Son", though not revealed as such until he also became the "Son of God" through incarnation. "Son of God" draws attention to his humanity, whereas "God the Son" refers more generally to his divinity, including his pre-incarnate existence. So, in Christian theology, Jesus was always God the Son, though not revealed as such until he also became the Son of God through incarnation.

The exact phrase "God the Son" is not in the New Testament. Later theological use of this expression reflects what came to be standard interpretation of New Testament references, understood to imply Jesus's divinity, but the distinction of his person from that of the one God he called his Father. As such, the title is associated more with the development of the doctrine of the Trinity than with the Christological debates. There are over 40 places in the New Testament where Jesus is given the title "the Son of God", but scholars do not consider this to be an equivalent expression. "God the Son" is rejected by anti-trinitarians, who view this reversal of the most common term for Christ as a doctrinal perversion and as tending towards tritheism.

Matthew cites Jesus as saying, "Blessed are the peacemakers, for they will be called sons of God (5:9)." The gospels go on to document a great deal of controversy over Jesus being the Son of God, in a unique way. The book of the Acts of the Apostles and the letters of the New Testament, however, record the early teaching of the first Christians– those who believed Jesus to be both the Son of God, the Messiah, a man appointed by God, as well as God himself. This is evident in many places, however, the early part of the book of Hebrews addresses the issue in a deliberate, sustained argument, citing the scriptures of the Hebrew Bible as authorities. For example, the author quotes Psalm 45:6 as addressed by the God of Israel to Jesus.

- Hebrews 1:8. About the Son he says, "Your throne, O God, will last for ever and ever."

The author of Hebrews' description of Jesus as the exact representation of the divine Father has parallels in a passage in Colossians.

- Colossians 2:9–10. "in Christ all the fullness of the Deity lives in bodily form"

John's gospel quotes Jesus at length regarding his relationship with his heavenly Father. It also contains two famous attributions of divinity to Jesus.

- John 1:1. "the Word was God" [in context, the Word is Jesus, see Christ the Logos]
- John 20:28. "Thomas said to him, 'My Lord and my God!'"

The most direct references to Jesus as God are found in various letters.

- Romans 9:5. "Christ, who is God over all"
- Titus 2:13. "our great God and Savior, Jesus Christ"
- 2 Peter 1:1. "our God and Savior Jesus Christ"

The biblical basis for later trinitarian statements in creeds is the early baptism formula found in Matthew 28.

- Matthew 28:19. Go and make disciples of all nations, baptizing them in the name [note the singular] of the Father and of the Son and of the Holy Spirit. See also Great Commission.

===== Person of Christ =====
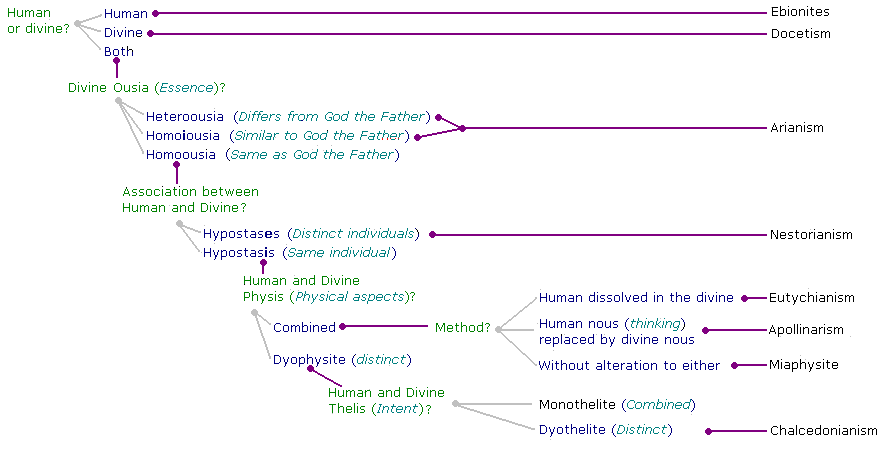
The various Christological positions, and their names

Only divine?

Docetism (from the Greek verb to seem) taught that Jesus was fully divine, and his human body was only illusory. At a very early stage, various Docetic groups arose; in particular, the gnostic sects which flourished in the 2nd century AD tended to have Docetic theologies. Docetic teachings were attacked by St. Ignatius of Antioch (early 2nd century), and appear to be targeted in the canonical Epistles of John (dates are disputed, but range from the late 1st century among traditionalist scholars to the late 2nd century among critical scholars).

The Council of Nicaea rejected theologies that entirely ruled out any humanity in Christ, affirming in the Nicene Creed the doctrine of the Incarnation as a part of the doctrine of the Trinity. That is, that the second person of the Trinity became incarnate in the person Jesus and was fully human.

Only human?

The early centuries of Christian history also had groups at the other end of the spectrum, arguing that Jesus was an ordinary mortal. The Adoptionists taught that Jesus was born fully human, and was adopted as God's Son when John the Baptist baptised him because of the life he lived. Another group, known as the Ebionites, taught that Jesus was not God, but the human Moshiach (messiah, anointed) prophet promised in the Hebrew Bible.

Some of these views could be described as Unitarianism (although that is a modern term) in their insistence on the oneness of God. These views, which directly affected how one understood the Godhead, were declared heresies by the Council of Nicaea. Throughout much of the rest of the ancient history of Christianity, Christologies that denied Christ's divinity ceased to have a major impact on the life of the church.

How can he be both?

What sort of divinity?

Arianism affirmed that Jesus was divine, but taught that he was nevertheless a created being (there was [a time] when he was not [in existence]), and was therefore less divine than God the Father. The matter boiled down to one iota; Arianism taught Homoiousia—the belief that Jesus's divinity is similar to that of God the Father—as opposed to Homoousia—the belief that Jesus's divinity is the same as that of God the Father. Arius' opponents additionally included in the term Arianism the belief that Jesus's divinity is different from that of God the Father (Heteroousia).

Arianism was condemned by the Council of Nicea, but remained popular in the northern and western provinces of the empire, and continued to be the majority view of western Europe well into the 6th century. Indeed, even the Christian legend of Constantine's death-bed baptism involves a bishop who, in recorded history, was an Arian.

In the modern era, a number of denominations have rejected the Nicene doctrine of the Trinity, including the Christadelphians and the Jehovah's Witnesses.

What sort of amalgamation?

The Christological debates following the Council of Nicaea sought to make sense of the interplay of the human and divine in the person of Christ while upholding the doctrine of the Trinity. Apollinaris of Laodicea (310–390) taught that in Jesus, the divine component took the place of the human nous (thinking– not to be confused with thelis, meaning intent). This however was seen as a denial of Jesus's true humanity, and the view was condemned at the First Council of Constantinople.

Subsequently, Nestorius of Constantinople (386–451) initiated a view that effectively separated Jesus into two persons—one divine and one human; the mechanism of this combination is known as hypostases, and contrasts with hypostasis—the view that there is no separation. Nestorius' theology was deemed heretical at the First Council of Ephesus (431). Though, as seen by the writings of Babai the Great, the Christology of the Church of the East is highly similar to that of Chalcedon, many orthodox Christians (particularly in the West) consider this group to be the perpetuation of Nestorianism; the modern Assyrian Church of the East has at times shunned this term, as it implies acceptance of the entire theology of Nestorius.

Various forms of Monophysitism taught that Christ only had one nature: that the divine had either dissolved (Eutychianism), or that the divine joined with the human as one nature in the person of Christ (Miaphysitism). A notable monophysite theologian was Eutyches (c. 380 – c. 456). Monophysitism was rejected as heresy at the Council of Chalcedon in 451, which affirmed that Jesus Christ had two natures (divine and human) joined in one person, in hypostatic union (see Chalcedonian creed). While Eutychianism was suppressed into oblivion by the Chalcedonians and Miaphysites, the Miaphysite groups who dissented from the Chalcedonian formula have persisted as the Oriental Orthodox Churches.

As theologians continued to search for a compromise between the Chalcedonian definition and the Monophysites, other Christologies developed that partially rejected the full humanity of Christ. Monothelitism taught that in the one person of Jesus there were two natures, but only a divine will. Closely related to this is Monoenergism, which held to the same doctrine as the Monothelites, but with different terminology. These positions were declared heresy by the Third Council of Constantinople (the Sixth Ecumenical Council, 680–681).

===== Incarnation =====
The Incarnation is the belief in Christianity that the second person in the Christian Godhead, also known as God the Son or the Logos (Word), "became flesh" when he was miraculously conceived in the womb of the Virgin Mary. The word Incarnate derives from Latin (in=in or into, caro, carnis=flesh) meaning "to make into flesh" or "to become flesh". The incarnation is a fundamental theological teaching of orthodox (Nicene) Christianity, based on its understanding of the New Testament. The incarnation represents the belief that Jesus, who is the non-created second hypostasis of the triune God, took on a human body and nature and became both man and God. In the Bible its clearest teaching is in John 1:14: "And the Word became flesh, and dwelt among us."

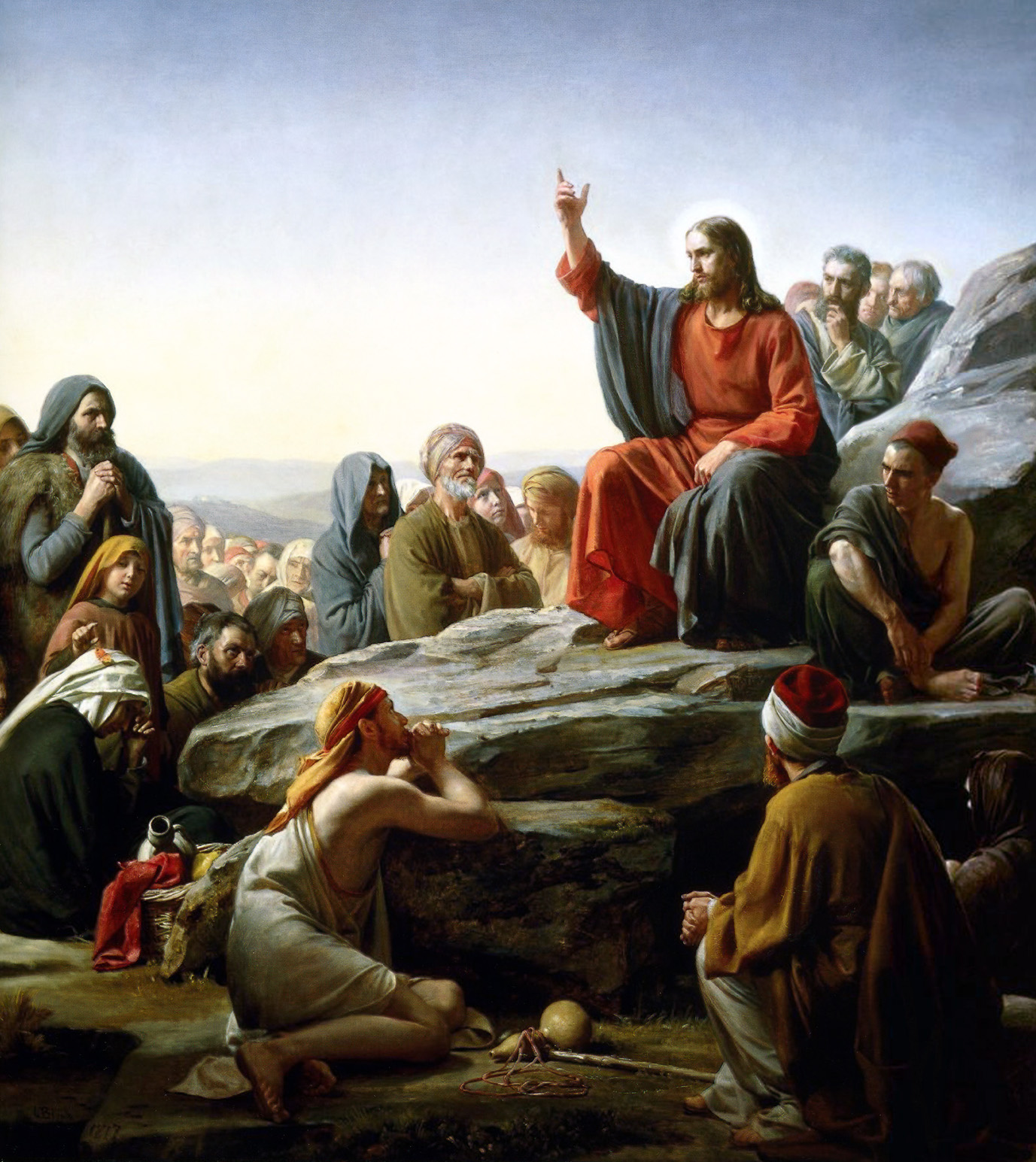
Jesus, believed to be both man and God, gives his Sermon on the Mount, 1877 painting by Carl Heinrich Bloch

In the Incarnation, as traditionally defined, the divine nature of the Son was joined but not mixed with human nature in one divine Person, Jesus Christ, who was both "truly God and truly man". The Incarnation is commemorated and celebrated each year at Christmas, and also reference can be made to the Feast of the Annunciation; "different aspects of the mystery of the Incarnation" are celebrated at Christmas and the Annunciation.

This is central to the traditional faith held by most Christians. Alternative views on the subject (See Ebionites and the Gospel according to the Hebrews) have been proposed throughout the centuries (see below), but all were rejected by mainstream Christian bodies.

In recent decades, an alternative doctrine known as "Oneness" has been espoused among various Pentecostal groups (see below), but has been rejected by the remainder of Christendom.

Description and development of the traditional doctrine

Early Christians disagreed on the nature of Christ's Incarnation. While all Christians believed that Jesus was indeed the Son of God, the exact nature of his Sonship was contested, together with the precise relationship of the "Father", "Son" and "Holy Ghost" referred to in the New Testament. Though Jesus was clearly the "Son", what exactly did this mean? Debate on this subject raged most especially during the first four centuries of Christianity, involving Jewish Christians, Gnostics, followers of the Presbyter Arius of Alexandra, and adherents of St. Athanasius the Great, among others.

Eventually, the Christian Church accepted the teaching of St. Athanasius and his allies, that Christ was the incarnation of the eternal second person of the Trinity, who was fully God and fully a man simultaneously. All divergent beliefs were defined as heresies. This included Docetism, which said that Jesus was a divine being that took on human appearance but not flesh; Arianism, which held that Christ was a created being; and Nestorianism, which maintained that the Son of God and the man, Jesus, shared the same body but retained two separate natures. The Oneness belief held by certain modern Pentecostal churches is also seen as heretical by most mainstream Christian bodies.

The most widely accepted the early Christian Church made definitions of the Incarnation and the nature of Jesus at the First Council of Nicaea in 325, the Council of Ephesus in 431, and the Council of Chalcedon in 451. These councils declared that Jesus was both fully God: begotten from, but not created by the Father; and fully man: taking his flesh and human nature from the Virgin Mary. These two natures, human and divine, were hypostatically united into the one personhood of Jesus Christ.

Fortuitous and Necessary Incarnation

The link between the Incarnation and the Atonement within systematic theological thought is complex. Within traditional models of the Atonement, such as Substitution, Satisfaction or Christus Victor, Christ must be Divine in order for the Sacrifice of the Cross to be efficacious, for human sins to be "removed" or "conquered". In his work The Trinity and the Kingdom of God, Jurgen Moltmann differentiated between what he called a "fortuitous" and a "necessary" Incarnation. The latter gives a soteriological emphasis to the Incarnation: the Son of God became a man so that he could save us from our sins. The former, on the other hand, speaks of the Incarnation as a fulfilment of the Love of God, of his desire to be present and living amidst humanity, to "walk in the garden" with us.

Moltmann favours "fortuitous" incarnation primarily because he feels that to speak of an incarnation of "necessity" is to do an injustice to the life of Christ. Moltmann's work, alongside other systematic theologians, opens up avenues of liberation Christology.

===== Hypostatic union =====
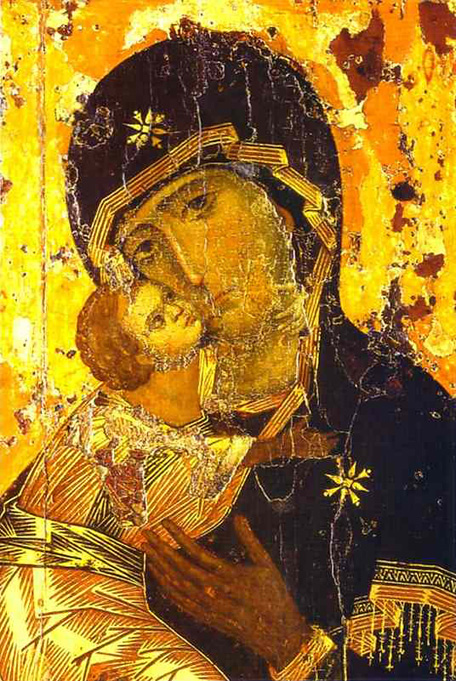
A depiction of Jesus and Mary, the Theotokos of Vladimir (12th century)

In short, this doctrine states that two natures, one human and one divine, are united in the one person of Christ. The Council further taught that each of these natures, the human and the divine, was distinct and complete. This view is sometimes called Dyophysite (meaning two natures) by those who rejected it.

Hypostatic union (from the Greek for substance) is a technical term in Christian theology employed in mainstream Christology to describe the union of two natures, humanity and divinity, in Jesus Christ. A brief definition of the doctrine of two natures can be given as: "Jesus Christ, who is identical with the Son, is one person and one hypostasis in two natures: a human and a divine."

The First Council of Ephesus recognised this doctrine and affirmed its importance, stating that the humanity and divinity of Christ are made one according to nature and hypostasis in the Logos.

The First Council of Nicaea declared that the Father and the Son are of the same substance and are co-eternal. This belief was expressed in the Nicene Creed.

Apollinaris of Laodicea was the first to use the term hypostasis in trying to understand the Incarnation. Apollinaris described the union of the divine and human in Christ as being of a single nature and having a single essence– a single hypostasis.

The Nestorian Theodore of Mopsuestia went in the other direction, arguing that in Christ there were two natures (dyophysite) (human and divine) and two hypostases (in the sense of "essence" or "person") that co-existed.

The Chalcedonian Creed agreed with Theodore that there were two natures in the Incarnation. However, the Council of Chalcedon also insisted that hypostasis be used as it was in the Trinitarian definition: to indicate the person and not the nature as with Apollinarius.

Thus, the Council declared that in Christ there are two natures; each retaining its own properties, and together united in one subsistence and in one single person.

As the precise nature of this union is held to defy finite human comprehension, the hypostatic union is also referred to by the alternative term "mystical union".

The Oriental Orthodox Churches, having rejected the Chalcedonian Creed, were known as Monophysites because they would only accept a definition that characterized the incarnate Son as having one nature. The Chalcedonian "in two natures" formula was seen as derived from and akin to a Nestorian Christology. Contrariwise, the Chalcedonians saw the Oriental Orthodox as tending towards Eutychian Monophysitism. However, the Oriental Orthodox have in modern ecumenical dialogue specified that they have never believed in the doctrines of Eutyches, that they have always affirmed that Christ's humanity is consubstantial with our own, and they thus prefer the term "Miaphysite" to refer to themselves (a reference to Cyrillian Christology, which used the phrase "mia physis tou theou logou sesarkomene").

In recent times, leaders from the Eastern Orthodox and Oriental Orthodox Churches have signed joint statements in an attempt to work towards reunification.

===== Other Christological concerns =====
The sinlessness of Christ

Although Christian orthodoxy holds that Jesus was fully human, Hebrews 7:26 states that Christ was 'holy and without evil'. The question concerning the sinlessness of Jesus Christ focuses on this seeming paradox. Does being fully human require that one participate in the "fall" of Adam, or could Jesus exist in an "unfallen" status as Adam and Eve did before the "fall", according to Genesis 2–3?

Kinds of sinlessness

Evangelical writer Donald Macleod suggests that the sinless nature of Jesus Christ involves two elements. "First, Christ was free of actual sin." Studying the gospels there is no reference to Jesus praying for the forgiveness of sin, nor confessing sin. The assertion is that Jesus did not commit sin, nor could he be proven guilty of sin; he had no vices. In fact, he is quoted as asking, "Can any of you prove me guilty of sin?" in John 8:46. "Secondly, he was free from inherent sin ("original sin" or "ancestral sin")."

Temptation of Christ

The temptation of Christ shown in the gospels affirms that he was tempted. Indeed, the temptations were genuine and of a greater intensity than normally experienced by human beings. He experienced all the frail weaknesses of humanity. Jesus was tempted through hunger and thirst, pain and the love of his friends. Thus, the human weaknesses could engender temptation. Nevertheless, MacLeod notes that "one crucial respect in which Christ was not like us is that he was not tempted by anything within himself."

The temptations Christ faced focused upon his person and identity as the incarnate Son of God. MacLeod writes, "Christ could be tempted through his sonship." The temptation in the wilderness and again in Gethsemane exemplifies this arena of temptation. Regarding the temptation of performing a sign that would affirm his sonship by throwing himself from the pinnacle of the temple, MacLeod observes, "The sign was for himself: a temptation to seek reassurance, as if to say, 'the real question is my own sonship. I must forget all else and all others and all further service until that is clear.'" MacLeod places this struggle in the context of the incarnation, "...he has become a man and must accept not only the appearance but the reality."

Communication of attributes

The communion of attributes (Communicatio idiomatum) of Christ's divine and human natures is understood according to Chalcedonian theology to mean that they exist together with neither overriding the other. That is, both are preserved and coexist in one person. Christ had all the properties of God and humanity. God did not stop being God and become man. Christ was not half-God and half-human. The two natures did not mix into a new third kind of nature. Although independent, they acted in complete accord; when one nature acted, so did the other. The natures did not commingle, merge, infuse each other, or replace each other. One was not converted into the other. They remained distinct (yet acted with one accord).

Virgin Birth

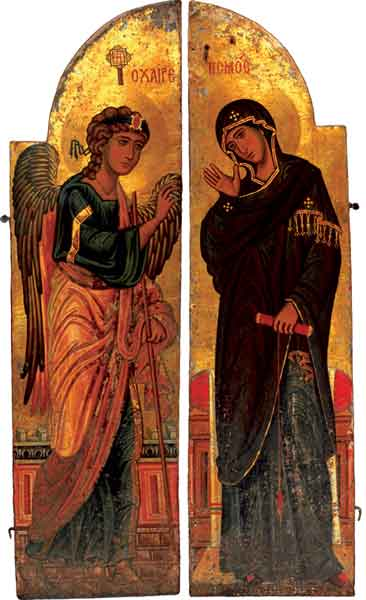
Holy Doors from Saint Catherine's Monastery, Mount Sinai, depicting the Annunciation, c. 12th century

The Gospel according to Matthew and Gospel according to Luke suggest a virgin birth of Jesus Christ. Some now disregard or even argue against this "doctrine" to which most denominations of Christianity ascribe. This section looks at the Christological issues surrounding belief or disbelief in the virgin birth.

A non-virgin birth would seem to require some form of adoptionism. This is because a human conception and birth would seem to yield a fully human Jesus, with some other mechanism required to make Jesus divine as well.

A non-virgin birth would seem to support the full humanity of Jesus. William Barclay: states, "The supreme problem of the virgin birth is that it does quite undeniably differentiate Jesus from all men; it does leave us with an incomplete incarnation."

Barth speaks of the virgin birth as the divine sign "which accompanies and indicates the mystery of the incarnation of the Son."

Donald MacLeod gives several Christological implications of a virgin birth:

- Highlights salvation as a supernatural act of God rather than an act of human initiative.
- Avoids adoptionism (which is virtually required if a normal birth).
- Reinforces the sinlessness of Christ, especially as it relates to Christ being outside the sin of Adam (original sin).

Relationship of Persons

The discussion of whether the three distinct persons in the Godhead of the Trinity were of greater, equal, or lesser by comparison was also, like many other areas of early Christology, a subject of debate. In Athenagoras of Athens (c. 133–190) writings we find a very developed trinitarian doctrine. On the one end of the spectrum was modalism, a doctrine stating that the three persons of the Trinity were equal to the point of erasing their differences and distinctions. On the other end of the spectrum were tritheism as well as some radically subordinationist views, the latter of which emphasized the primacy of the Father of Creation to the deity of Christ and Jesus's authority over the Holy Spirit. During the Council of Nicea, the modalist bishops of Rome and Alexandria aligned politically with Athanasius; whereas the bishops of Constantinople (Nicomedia), Antioch, and Jerusalem sided with the subordinationists as middle ground between Arius and Athanasius.

==== Approaches to Christology ====
Theologians like Jurgen Moltmann and Walter Kasper have characterized Christologies as anthropological or cosmological. These are also termed 'Christology from below' and 'Christology from above' respectively. An anthropological Christology starts with the human person of Jesus and works from his life and ministry toward what it means for him to be divine; whereas, a cosmological Christology works in the opposite direction. Starting from the eternal Logos, a cosmological Christology works toward his humanity. Theologians typically begin on one side or the other and their choice inevitably colors their resultant Christology. As a starting point, these options represent "diverse yet complementary" approaches; each poses its own difficulties. Both Christologies 'from above' and 'from below' must come to terms with the two natures of Christ: human and divine. Just as light can be perceived as a wave or as a particle, so Jesus must be thought in terms of both his divinity and humanity. You cannot talk about "either or" but must talk about "both and".

Cosmological approaches

Christologies from above start with the Logos, the second Person of the Trinity, establish his eternality, his agency in creation, and his economic Sonship. Jesus's unity with God is established by the Incarnation as the divine Logos assumes a human nature. This approach was common in the early church—e.g., St. Paul and St. John in the Gospels. The attribution of full humanity to Jesus is resolved by stating that the two natures mutually share their properties (a concept termed communicatio idiomatum).

Anthropological approaches

Christologies from below start with the human being Jesus as the representative of the new humanity, not with the pre-existent Logos. Jesus lives an exemplary life, one to which we aspire in religious experience. This form of Christology lends itself to mysticism, and some of its roots go back to emergence of Christ mysticism in the 6th century East, but in the West it flourished between the 11th and 14th centuries. A recent theologian Wolfhart Pannenberg contends that the resurrected Jesus is the "eschatological fulfillment of human destiny to live in nearness to God."

Political approaches

The Christian faith is inherently political because allegiance to Jesus as risen Lord relativises all earthly rule and authority. Jesus is called "Lord" over 230 times in Paul's epistles alone, and is thus the principal confession of faith in the Pauline epistles. Further, N.T. Wright argues that this Pauline confession is the core of the gospel of salvation. The Achilles' heel of this approach is the loss of eschatological tension between this present age and the future divine rule that is yet to come. This can happen when the state co-opts Christ's authority as was often the case in imperial Christology. Modern political Christologies seek to overcome imperialist ideologies.

==== Works of Christ ====
Resurrection of Jesus

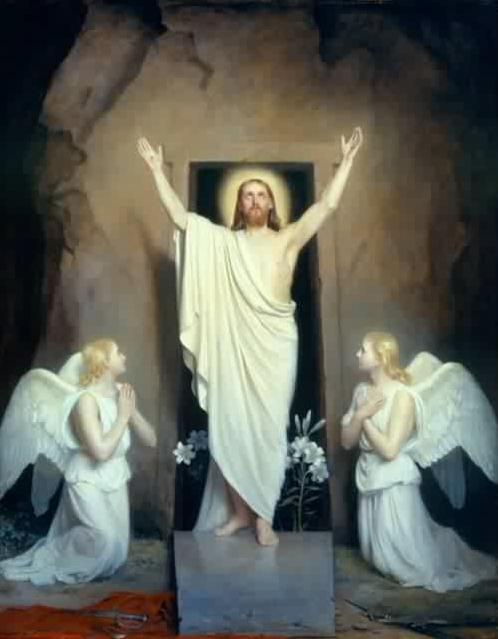
The Resurrection of Christ by Carl Heinrich Bloch, 1875.

The resurrection is perhaps the most controversial aspect of the life of Jesus Christ. Christianity hinges on this point of Christology, both as a response to a particular history and as a confessional response. Some Christians claim that because he was resurrected, the future of the world was forever altered. Most Christians believe that Jesus's resurrection brings reconciliation with God (II Corinthians 5:18), the destruction of death (I Corinthians 15:26), and forgiveness of sins for followers of Jesus Christ.

After Jesus had died, and was buried, the New Testament states that he appeared to others in bodily form. Some skeptics say his appearances were only perceived by his followers in mind or spirit. The gospels state that the disciples believed they witnessed Jesus's resurrected body and that led to the beginning of the faith. They had previously hid in fear of persecution after Jesus's death. After seeing Jesus they boldly proclaimed the message of Jesus Christ despite tremendous risk. They obeyed Jesus's mandate to be reconciled to God through repentance (Luke 24:47), baptism, and obedience (Matthew 28:19–20).

Offices as Prophet, Priest, and King

Jesus Christ, the Mediator of humankind, fulfills the three offices of Prophet, Priest, and King. Eusebius of the early church worked out this threefold classification, which during the Reformation played a substantial role in scholastic Lutheran Christology and in John Calvin's and John Wesley's Christology.

=== Pneumatology: Holy Spirit ===
Pneumatology is the study of the Holy Spirit. Pneuma (πνεῦμα) is Greek for "breath", which metaphorically describes a non-material being or influence. In Christian theology pneumatology refers to the study of the Holy Spirit. In Christianity, the Holy Spirit (or Holy Ghost) is the Spirit of God. Within mainstream (Trinitarian) Christian beliefs he is the third person of the Trinity. As part of the Godhead, the Holy Spirit is equal with God the Father and with God the Son. The Christian theology of the Holy Spirit was the last piece of Trinitarian theology to be fully developed.

Within mainstream (Trinitarian) Christianity the Holy Spirit is one of the three persons of the Trinity who make up the single substance of God. As such the Holy Spirit is personal, and as part of the Godhead, he is fully God, co-equal and co-eternal with God the Father and Son of God. He is different from the Father and the Son in that he proceeds from the Father (or from the Father and the Son) as described in the Nicene Creed. His sacredness is reflected in the New Testament gospels which proclaim blasphemy against the Holy Spirit as unforgivable.

The English word comes from two Greek words: πνευμα (pneuma, spirit) and λογος (logos, teaching about). Pneumatology would normally include study of the person of the Holy Spirit, and the works of the Holy Spirit. This latter category would normally include Christian teachings on new birth, spiritual gifts (charismata), Spirit-baptism, sanctification, the inspiration of prophets, and the indwelling of the Holy Trinity (which in itself covers many different aspects). Different Christian denominations have different theological approaches.

Christians believe that the Holy Spirit leads people to faith in Jesus and gives them the ability to live a Christian lifestyle. The Holy Spirit dwells inside every Christian, each one's body being his temple. Jesus described the Holy Spirit as paracletus in Latin, derived from Greek. The word is variously translated as Comforter, Counselor, Teacher, Advocate, guiding people in the way of the truth. The Holy Spirit's action in one's life is believed to produce positive results, known as the Fruit of the Holy Spirit. The Holy Spirit enables Christians, who still experience the effects of sin, to do things they never could do on their own. These spiritual gifts are not innate abilities "unlocked" by the Holy Spirit, but entirely new abilities, such as the ability to cast out demons or simply bold speech. Through the influence of the Holy Spirit, a person sees more clearly the world around him or her and can use his or her mind and body in ways that exceed his or her previous capacity. A list of gifts that may be bestowed include the charismatic gifts of prophecy, tongues, healing, and knowledge. Christians holding a view known as cessationism believe these gifts were given only in New Testament times. Christians almost universally agree that certain "spiritual gifts" are still in effect today, including the gifts of ministry, teaching, giving, leadership, and mercy. The experience of the Holy Spirit is sometimes referred to as being anointed.

After his resurrection, Christ told his disciples that they would be "baptized with the Holy Spirit" and would receive power from this event, a promise that was fulfilled in the events recounted in the second chapter of Acts. On the first Pentecost, Jesus's disciples were gathered in Jerusalem when a mighty wind was heard and tongues of fire appeared over their heads. A multilingual crowd heard the disciples speaking, and each of them heard them speaking in his or her native language.

The Holy Spirit is believed to perform specific divine functions in the life of the Christian or the church. These include:

- Conviction of sin. The Holy Spirit acts to convince the unredeemed person both of the sinfulness of their actions, and of their moral standing as sinners before God.
- Bringing to conversion. The action of the Holy Spirit is seen as an essential part of the bringing of the person to the Christian faith. The new believer is "born again of the Spirit".
- Enabling the Christian life. The Holy Spirit is believed to dwell in the individual believers and enable them to live a righteous and faithful life.
- As a comforter or Paraclete, one who intercedes, or supports or acts as an advocate, particularly in times of trial.
- Inspiration and interpretation of scripture. The Holy Spirit both inspires the writing of the scriptures and interprets them to the Christian and church.

The Holy Spirit is also believed to be active especially in the life of Jesus Christ, enabling him to fulfill his work on earth. Particular actions of the Holy Spirit include:

- Cause of his birth. According to the gospel accounts of the birth of Jesus, the "beginning of His incarnate existence", was due to the Holy Spirit.
- Anointing him at his baptism.
- Empowerment of his ministry. The ministry of Jesus following his baptism (in which the Holy Spirit is described in the gospels as "descending on Him like a dove") is conducted in the power and at the direction of the Holy Spirit.

Fruit of the Spirit

Christians believe the "Fruit of the Spirit" consists of virtuous characteristics engendered in the Christian by the action of the Holy Spirit. They are those listed in Galatians 5:22–23: "But the fruit of the Spirit is love, joy, peace, patience, kindness, goodness, faithfulness, gentleness, and self-control." The Roman Catholic Church adds to this list generosity, modesty, and chastity.

Gifts of the Spirit

Christians believe that the Holy Spirit gives 'gifts' to Christians. These gifts consist of specific abilities granted to the individual Christian. They are frequently known by the Greek word for gift, Charisma, from which the term charismatic derives. The New Testament provides three different lists of such gifts which range from the supernatural (healing, prophecy, tongues) through those associated with specific callings (teaching) to those expected of all Christians in some degree (faith). Most consider these lists not to be exhaustive, and other have compiled their own lists. Saint Ambrose wrote of the Seven Gifts of the Holy Spirit poured out on a believer at baptism: 1. Spirit of Wisdom; 2. Spirit of Understanding; 3. Spirit of Counsel; 4. Spirit of Strength; 5. Spirit of Knowledge; 6. Spirit of Godliness; 7. Spirit of Holy Fear.

It is over the nature and occurrence of these gifts, particularly the supernatural gifts (sometimes called charismatic gifts), that the greatest disagreement between Christians with regard to the Holy Spirit exists.

One view is that the supernatural gifts were a special dispensation for the apostolic ages, bestowed because of the unique conditions of the church at that time, and are extremely rarely bestowed in the present time. This is the view of some in the Catholic Church and many other mainstream Christian groups. The alternate view, espoused mainly by Pentecostal denominations and the charismatic movement, is that the absence of the supernatural gifts was due to the neglect of the Holy Spirit and his work by the church. Although some small groups, such as the Montanists, practiced the supernatural gifts they were rare until the growth of the Pentecostal movement in the late 19th century.

Believers in the relevance of the supernatural gifts sometimes speak of a Baptism of the Holy Spirit or Filling of the Holy Spirit which the Christian needs to experience in order to receive those gifts. Many churches hold that the Baptism of the Holy Spirit is identical with conversion, and that all Christians are by definition baptized in the Holy Spirit.

== Cosmology: Things created ==
And God said, Let there be light: and there was light.And God saw the light, that it was good: and God divided the light from the darkness.And God called the light Day, and the darkness he called Night. And the evening and the morning were the first day. Genesis 1: 3–5

The various authors of the Old and New Testament provide glimpses of their insight regarding cosmology. The cosmos was created by God by divine command, in the best-known and most complete account in the Bible, that of Genesis 1.

=== World ===
Within this broad understanding, however, there are a number of views regarding exactly how this doctrine ought to be interpreted.

- Some Christians, particularly Young and Old Earth creationists, interpret Genesis as an accurate and literal account of creation.
- Others may understand these to be, instead, spiritual insights more vaguely defined.

It is a tenet of Christian faith (Catholic, Eastern Orthodox, and Protestant) that God is the creator of all things from nothing, and has made human beings in the Image of God, who by direct inference is also the source of the human soul. In Chalcedonian Christology, Jesus is the Word of God, which was in the beginning and, thus, is uncreated, and hence is God, and consequently identical with the Creator of the world ex nihilo.

Roman Catholicism uses the phrase special creation to refer to the doctrine of immediate or special creation of each human soul. In 2004, the International Theological Commission, then under the presidency of Cardinal Joseph Ratzinger, published a paper in which it accepts the current scientific accounts of the history of the universe commencing in the Big Bang about 15 billion years ago and of the evolution of all life on Earth including humans from the micro organisms commencing about 4 billion years ago. The Roman Catholic Church allows for both a literal and allegorical interpretation of Genesis, so as to allow for the possibility of Creation by means of an evolutionary process over great spans of time, otherwise known as theistic evolution. It believes that the creation of the world is a work of God through the Logos, the Word (idea, intelligence, reason and logic):

"In the beginning was the Word...and the Word was God...all things were made through him, and without him was not anything made that was made."

The New Testament claims that God created everything by the eternal Word, Jesus Christ his beloved Son. In him

"all things were created, in heaven and on earth... all things were created through him and for him. He is before all things, and in him all things hold together."

=== Anthropology: Humanity ===
Christian anthropology is the study of humanity, especially as it relates to the divine. This theological anthropology refers to the study of the human ("anthropology") as it relates to God. It differs from the social science of anthropology, which primarily deals with the comparative study of the physical and social characteristics of humanity across times and places.

One aspect studies the innate nature or constitution of the human, known as the nature of mankind. It is concerned with the relationship between notions such as body, soul and spirit which together form a person, based on their descriptions in the Bible. There are three traditional views of the human constitution– trichotomism, dichotomism and monism (in the sense of anthropology).

==== Components ====
Soul

The semantic domain of Biblical soul is based on the Hebrew word nepes, which presumably means "breath" or "breathing being". This word never means an immortal soul or an incorporeal part of the human being that can survive death of the body as the spirit of dead. This word usually designates the person as a whole or its physical life. In the Septuagint nepes is mostly translated as psyche (ψυχή) and, exceptionally, in the Book of Joshua as empneon (ἔμπνεον), that is "breathing being".

The New Testament follows the terminology of the Septuagint, and thus uses the word psyche with the Hebrew semantic domain and not the Greek, that is an invisible power (or ever more, for Platonists, immortal and immaterial) that gives life and motion to the body and is responsible for its attributes.

In Patristic thought, towards the end of the 2nd century psyche was understood in more a Greek than a Hebrew way, and it was contrasted with the body. In the 3rd century, with the influence of Origen, there was the establishing of the doctrine of the inherent immortality of the soul and its divine nature. Origen also taught the transmigration of the souls and their preexistence, but these views were officially rejected in 553 in the Fifth Ecumenical Council. Inherent immortality of the soul was accepted among western and eastern theologians throughout the middle ages, and after the Reformation, as evidenced by the Westminster Confession.

Spirit

The spirit (Hebrew ruach, Greek πνεῦμα, pneuma, which can also mean "breath") is likewise an immaterial component. It is often used interchangeably with "soul", psyche, although trichotomists believe that the spirit is distinct from the soul.

"When Paul speaks of the pneuma of man he does not mean some higher principle within him or some special intellectual or spiritual faculty of his, but simply his self, and the only questions is whether the self is regarded in some particular aspect when it is called pneuma. In the first place, it apparently is regarded in the same way as when it is called psyche– viz. as the self that lives in man's attitude, in the orientation of his will."

Body, Flesh

The body (Greek σῶμα soma) is the corporeal or physical aspect of a human being. Christians have traditionally believed that the body will be resurrected at the end of the age.

Flesh (Greek σάρξ, sarx) is usually considered synonymous with "body", referring to the corporeal aspect of a human being. The apostle Paul contrasts flesh and spirit in Romans 7–8.

==== Origin of humanity ====
The Bible teaches in the book of Genesis the humans were created by God. Some Christians believe that this must have involved a miraculous creative act, while others are comfortable with the idea that God worked through the evolutionary process.

The book of Genesis also teaches that human beings, male and female, were created in the image of God. The exact meaning of this has been debated throughout church history.

==== Death and afterlife ====
Christian anthropology has implications for beliefs about death and the afterlife. The Christian church has traditionally taught that the soul of each individual separates from the body at death, to be reunited at the resurrection. This is closely related to the doctrine of the immortality of the soul. For example, the Westminster Confession (chapter XXXII) states:

"The bodies of men, after death, return to dust, and see corruption: but their souls, which neither die nor sleep, having an immortal subsistence, immediately return to God who gave them"

Intermediate state

The question then arises: where exactly does the disembodied soul "go" at death? Theologians refer to this subject as the intermediate state. The Old Testament speaks of a place called sheol where the spirits of the dead reside. In the New Testament, hades, the classical Greek realm of the dead, takes the place of sheol. In particular, Jesus teaches in Luke 16:19–31 (Lazarus and Dives) that hades consists of two separate "sections", one for the righteous and one for the unrighteous. His teaching is consistent with intertestamental Jewish thought on the subject.

Fully developed Christian theology goes a step further; on the basis of such texts as Luke 23:43 and Philippians 1:23, it has traditionally been taught that the souls of the dead are received immediately either into heaven or hell, where they will experience a foretaste of their eternal destiny prior to the resurrection. (Roman Catholicism teaches a third possible location, Purgatory, though this is denied by Protestants and Eastern Orthodox.)

"the souls of the righteous, being then made perfect in holiness, are received into the highest heavens, where they behold the face of God, in light and glory, waiting for the full redemption of their bodies. And the souls of the wicked are cast into hell, where they remain in torments and utter darkness, reserved to the judgment of the great day." (Westminster Confession)

Some Christian groups which stress a monistic anthropology deny that the soul can exist consciously apart from the body. For example, the Seventh-day Adventist Church teaches that the intermediate state is an unconscious sleep; this teaching is informally known as "soul sleep".

Final state

In Christian belief, both the righteous and the unrighteous will be resurrected at the last judgment. The righteous will receive incorruptible, immortal bodies (1 Corinthians 15), while the unrighteous will be sent to hell. Traditionally, Christians have believed that hell will be a place of eternal physical and psychological punishment. In the last two centuries, annihilationism has become popular.

=== Mariology ===
The study of the Blessed Virgin Mary, doctrines about her, and how she relates to the Church, Christ, and the individual Christian is called Mariology. Catholic Mariology is the Marian study specifically in the context of the Catholic Church. Examples of Mariology include the study of and doctrines regarding her Perpetual Virginity, her Motherhood of God (and by extension her Motherhood/Intercession for all Christians), her Immaculate Conception, and her Assumption into heaven.

=== Angelology ===
Most descriptions of angels in the Bible describe them in military terms. For example, in terms such as encampment (Gen.32:1–2), command structure (Ps.91:11–12; Matt.13:41; Rev.7:2), and combat (Jdg.5:20; Job 19:12; Rev.12:7).

Its specific hierarchy differs slightly from the Hierarchy of Angels as it surrounds more military services, whereas the Hierarchy of angels is a division of angels into non-military services to God.

==== Members of the heavenly host ====
Cherubim are depicted as accompanying God's chariot-throne (Ps.80:1). Exodus 25:18–22 refers to two Cherub statues placed on top of the Ark of the Covenant, the two cherubim are usually interpreted as guarding the throne of God. Other guard-like duties include being posted in locations such as the gates of Eden (Gen.3:24). Cherubim were mythological winged bulls or other beasts that were part of ancient Near Eastern traditions.

This angelic designation might be given to angels of various ranks. An example would be Raphael who is ranked variously as a Seraph, Cherub, and Archangel . This is usually a result of conflicting schemes of hierarchies of angels.

It is not known how many angels there are but one figure given in Revelation 5:11 for the number of "many angels in a circle around the throne, as well as the living creatures and the elders" was "ten thousand times ten thousand", which would be 100 million.

==== Demonology: Fallen angels ====
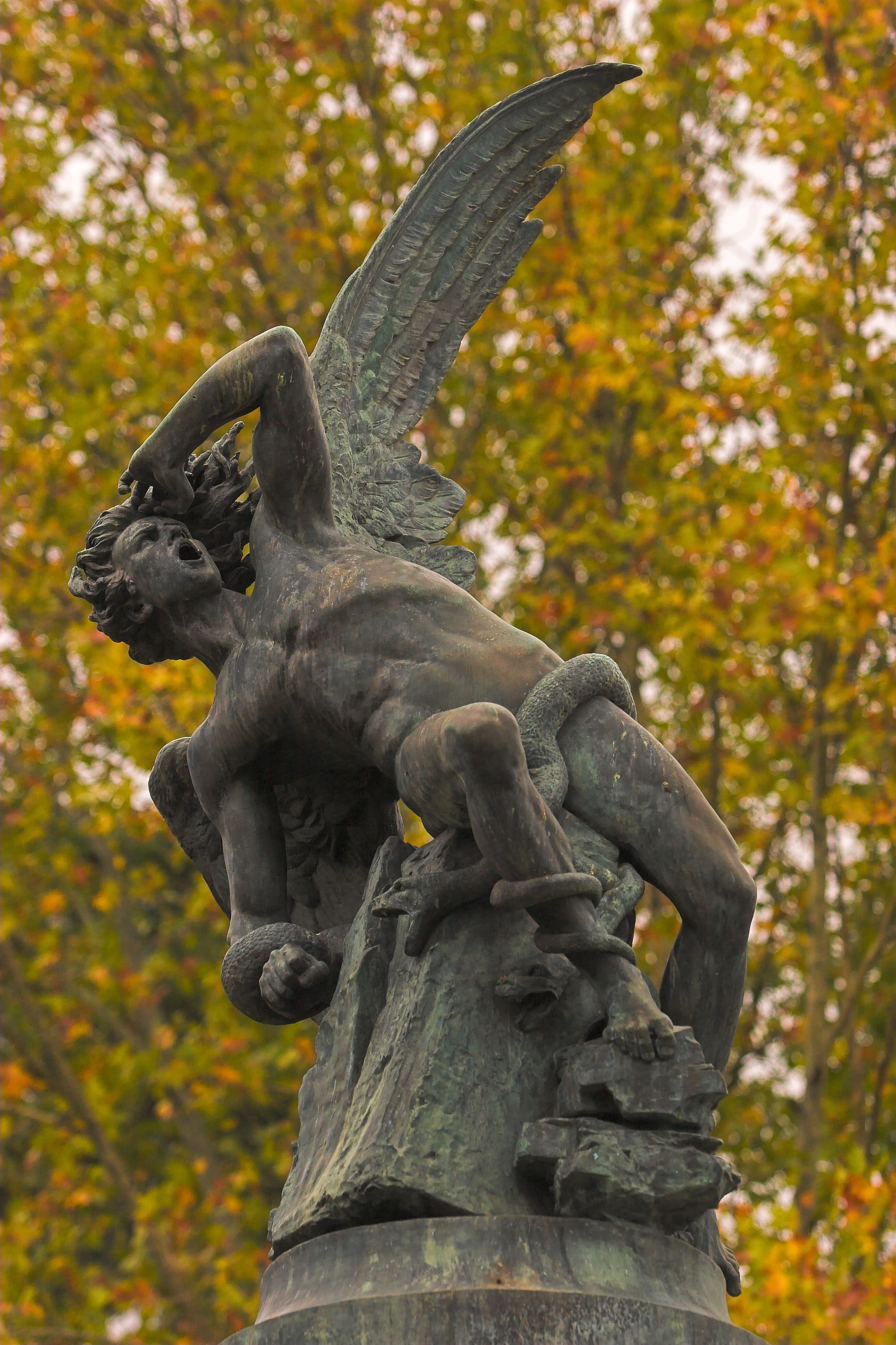
Statue of the Fallen Angel, Retiro Park (Madrid, Spain)

In most of Christianity, a fallen angel is an angel who has been exiled or banished from Heaven. Often such banishment is a punishment for disobeying or rebelling against God (see War in Heaven). The best-known fallen angel is Lucifer. Lucifer is a name frequently given to Satan in Christian belief. This usage stems from a particular interpretation, as a reference to a fallen angel, of a passage in the Bible (Isaiah 14:3–20) that speaks of someone who is given the name of "Day Star" or "Morning Star" (in Latin, Lucifer) as fallen from heaven. The Greek etymological synonym of Lucifer, Φωσφόρος (Phosphoros, "light-bearer"). is used of the morning star in 2 Peter 1:19 and elsewhere with no reference to Satan. But Satan is called Lucifer in many writings later than the Bible, notably in Milton's Paradise Lost (7.131–134, among others), because, according to Milton, Satan was "brighter once amidst the host of Angels, than that star the stars among."

Allegedly, fallen angels are those which have committed one of the seven deadly sins. Demons from hell would punish the fallen angel by ripping out their wings as a sign of insignificance and low rank.

=== Heaven ===
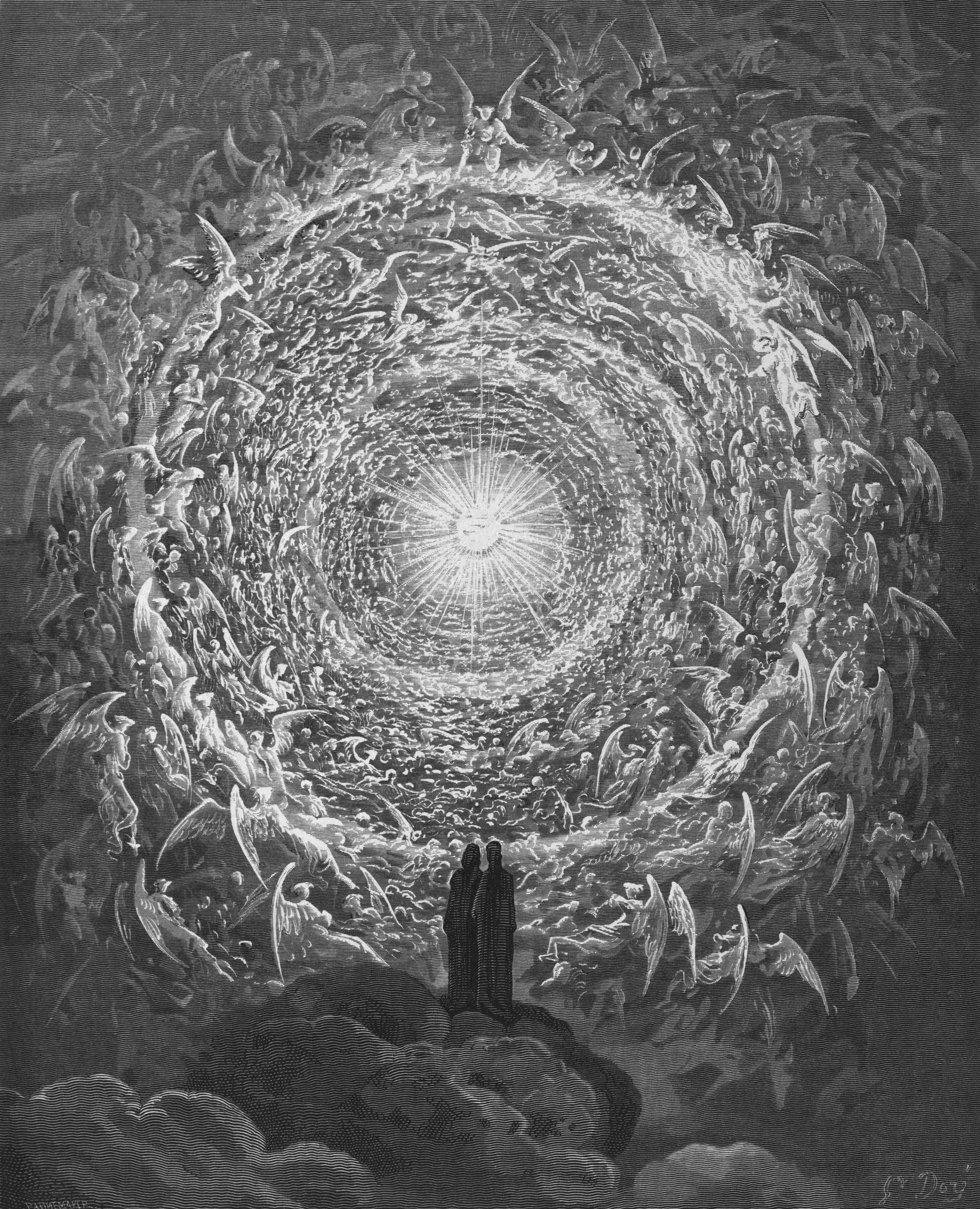
Dante and Beatrice gaze upon the highest heavens; from Gustave Doré's illustrations to the Divine Comedy.

Christianity has taught Heaven as a place of eternal life, in that it is a shared plane to be attained by all the elect (rather than an abstract experience related to individual concepts of the ideal). The Christian Church has been divided over how people gain this eternal life. From the 16th to the late 19th century, Christendom was divided between the Catholic view, the Eastern Orthodox view, the Coptic view, the Jacobite view, the Abyssinian view and Protestant views. See also Christian denominations.

Heaven is the English name for a transcendental realm wherein human beings who have transcended human living live in an afterlife. in the Bible and in English, the term "heaven" may refer to the physical heavens, the sky or the seemingly endless expanse of the universe beyond, the traditional literal meaning of the term in English.

Christianity maintains that entry into Heaven awaits such time as, "When the form of this world has passed away." (*JPII) One view expressed in the Bible is that on the day Christ returns the righteous dead are resurrected first, and then those who are alive and judged righteous will be brought up to join them, to be taken to heaven. (I Thess 4:13–18)

Two related and often confused concepts of heaven in Christianity are better described as the "resurrection of the body", which is exclusively of biblical origin, as contrasted with the "immortality of the soul", which is also evident in the Greek tradition. In the first concept, the soul does not enter heaven until the last judgement or the "end of time" when it (along with the body) is resurrected and judged. In the second concept, the soul goes to a heaven on another plane such as the intermediate state immediately after death. These two concepts are generally combined in the doctrine of the double judgement where the soul is judged once at death and goes to a temporary heaven, while awaiting a second and final physical judgement at the end of the world.(*" JPII, also see eschatology, afterlife)

One popular medieval view of Heaven was that it existed as a physical place above the clouds and that God and the Angels were physically above, watching over man. Heaven as a physical place survived in the concept that it was located far out into space, and that the stars were "lights shining through from heaven".

Many of today's biblical scholars, such as N. T. Wright, in tracing the concept of Heaven back to its Jewish roots, see Earth and Heaven as overlapping or interlocking. Heaven is known as God's space, his dimension, and is not a place that can be reached by human technology. This belief states that Heaven is where God lives and reigns whilst being active and working alongside people on Earth. One day when God restores all things, Heaven and Earth will be forever combined into the New Heavens and New Earth of the World to Come.

Religions that teach about heaven differ on how (and if) one gets into it, typically in the afterlife. In most, entrance to Heaven is conditional on having lived a "good life" (within the terms of the spiritual system). A notable exception to this is the 'sola fide' belief of many mainstream Protestants, which teaches that one does not have to live a perfectly "good life", but that one must accept Jesus Christ as one's Lord and Saviour, and then Jesus Christ will assume the guilt of one's sins; believers are believed to be forgiven regardless of any good or bad "works" one has participated in.

Many religions state that those who do not go to heaven will go to a place "without the presence of God", Hell, which is eternal (see annihilationism). Some religions believe that other afterlives exist in addition to Heaven and Hell, such as Purgatory. One belief, universalism, believes that everyone will go to Heaven eventually, no matter what they have done or believed on earth. Some forms of Christianity believe Hell to be the termination of the soul.

Various saints have had visions of heaven (2 Corinthians 12:2–4). The Eastern Orthodox concept of life in heaven is described in one of the prayers for the dead: "...a place of light, a place of green pasture, a place of repose, whence all sickness, sorrow and sighing are fled away."

The Church bases its belief in Heaven on some main biblical passages in the Hebrew and Christian Scriptures (Old and New Testaments) and collected church wisdom. Heaven is the Realm of the Blessed Trinity, the angels and the saints.

The essential joy of heaven is called the beatific vision, which is derived from the vision of God's essence. The soul rests perfectly in God, and does not, or cannot desire anything else than God. After the Last Judgment, when the soul is reunited with its body, the body participates in the happiness of the soul. It becomes incorruptible, glorious and perfect. Any physical defects the body may have laboured under are erased. Heaven is also known as paradise in some cases. The Great Gulf separates heaven from hell.

Upon dying, each soul goes to what is called "the particular judgement" where its own afterlife is decided (i.e. Heaven after Purgatory, straight to Heaven, or Hell.) This is different from "the general judgement" also known as "the Last judgement" which will occur when Christ returns to judge all the living and the dead.

The term Heaven (which differs from "The Kingdom of Heaven" see note below) is applied by the biblical authors to the realm in which God currently resides. Eternal life, by contrast, occurs in a renewed, unspoilt and perfect creation, which can be termed Heaven since God will choose to dwell there permanently with his people, as seen in Revelation 21:3. There will no longer be any separation between God and man. The believers themselves will exist in incorruptible, resurrected and new bodies; there will be no sickness, no death and no tears. Some teach that death itself is not a natural part of life, but was allowed to happen after Adam and Eve disobeyed God (see original sin) so that mankind would not live forever in a state of sin and thus a state of separation from God.

Many evangelicals understand this future life to be divided into two distinct periods: first, the Millennial Reign of Christ (the one thousand years) on this earth, referred to in Revelation 20:1–10; secondly, the New Heavens and New Earth, referred to in Revelation 21 and 22. This millennialism (or chiliasm) is a revival of a strong tradition in the Early Church that was dismissed by Saint Augustine of Hippo and the Roman Catholic Church after him.

Not only will the believers spend eternity with God, they will also spend it with each other. John's vision recorded in Revelation describes a New Jerusalem which comes from Heaven to the New Earth, which is seen to be a symbolic reference to the people of God living in community with one another. 'Heaven' will be the place where life will be lived to the full, in the way that the designer planned, each believer 'loving the Lord their God with all their heart and with all their soul and with all their mind' and 'loving their neighbour as themselves' (adapted from Matthew 22:37–38, the Great Commandment)—a place of great joy, without the negative aspects of earthly life. See also World to Come.

Purgatory

Purgatory is the condition or temporary punishment in which, it is believed, the souls of those who die in a state of grace are made ready for Heaven. This is a theological idea that has ancient roots and is well-attested in early Christian literature, while the poetic conception of purgatory as a geographically situated place is largely the creation of medieval Christian piety and imagination.

The notion of purgatory is associated particularly with the Latin Church of the Catholic Church (in the Eastern Catholic Churches it is a doctrine, though often without using the name "Purgatory"); Anglicans of the Anglo-Catholic tradition generally also hold to the belief. John Wesley, the founder of Methodism, believed in an intermediate state between death and the final judgment and in the possibility of "continuing to grow in holiness there." The Eastern Orthodox Churches believe in the possibility of a change of situation for the souls of the dead through the prayers of the living and the offering of the Divine Liturgy, and many Eastern Orthodox, especially among ascetics, hope and pray for a general apocatastasis. A similar belief in at least the possibility of a final salvation for all is held by Mormonism. Judaism also believes in the possibility of after-death purification and may even use the word "purgatory" to present its understanding of the meaning of Gehenna. However, the concept of soul "purification" may be explicitly denied in these other faith traditions.

=== Hell ===
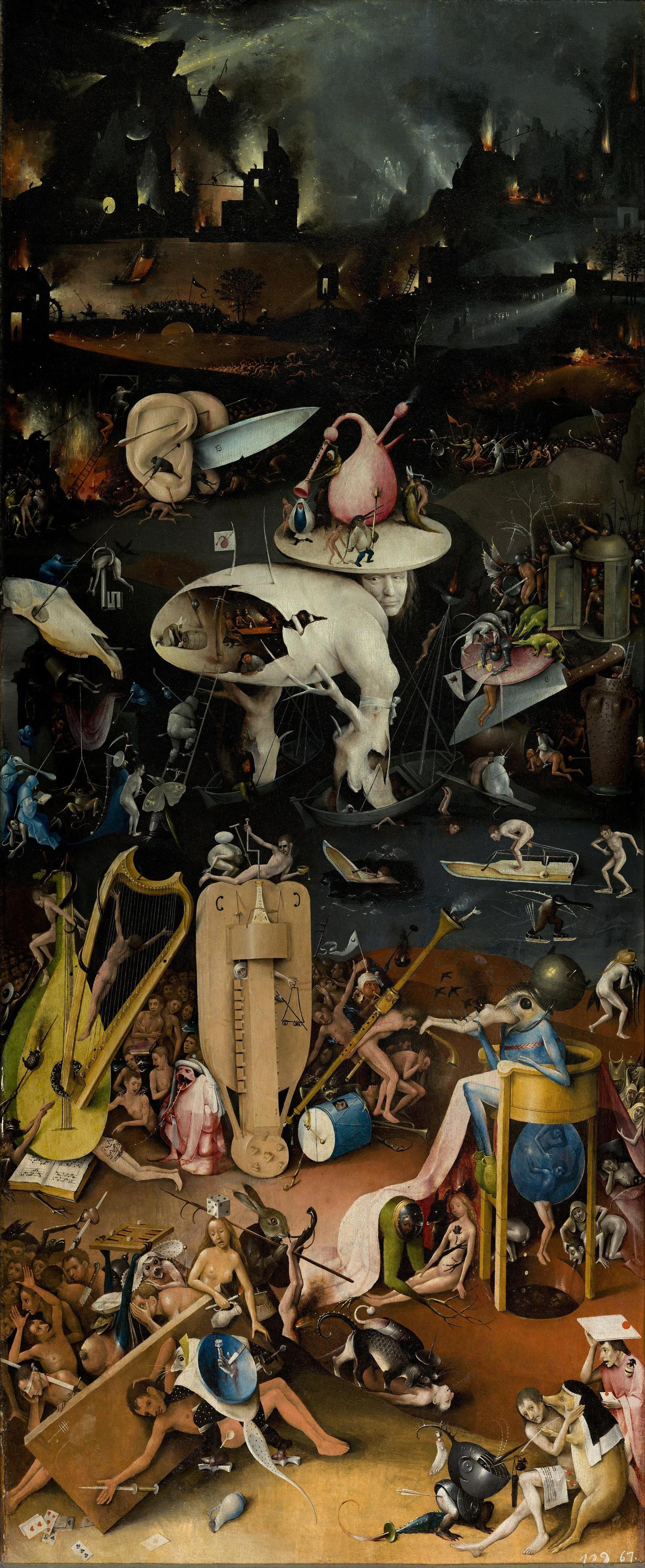
Hell as depicted in Hieronymus Bosch's triptych The Garden of Earthly Delights (c. 1504)

Hell in Christian beliefs, is a place or a state in which the souls of the unsaved will suffer the consequences of sin. The Christian doctrine of Hell derives from the teaching of the New Testament, where Hell is typically described using the Greek words Gehenna or Tartarus. In the New Testament, it is described as the place or state of punishment after death or last judgment for those who have rejected Jesus. In many classical and popular depictions it is also the abode of Satan and of Demons. Such is not the case in the Book of Revelation, where Satan is thrown into Hell only at the end of Christ's millennium long reign on this Earth.

Hell is generally defined as the eternal fate of unrepentant sinners after this life. Hell's character is inferred from biblical teaching, which has often been understood literally. Souls are said to pass into Hell by God's irrevocable judgment, either immediately after death (particular judgment) or in the general judgment. Modern theologians generally describe Hell as the logical consequence of the soul using its free will to reject the will of God. It is considered compatible with God's justice and mercy because God will not interfere with the soul's free choice.

Only in the King James Version of the bible is the word "Hell" used to translate certain words, such as sheol (Hebrew) and both hades and Gehenna (Greek). All other translations reserve Hell only for use when Gehenna is mentioned. It is generally agreed that both sheol and hades do not typically refer to the place of eternal punishment, but to the underworld or temporary abode of the dead.

Traditionally, the majority of Protestants have held that Hell will be a place of unending conscious torment, both physical and spiritual, although some recent writers (such as C. S. Lewis and J.P. Moreland) have cast Hell in terms of "eternal separation" from God. Certain biblical texts have led some theologians to the conclusion that punishment in Hell, though eternal and irrevocable, will be proportional to the deeds of each soul (e.g. Matthew 10:15, Luke 12:46–48).

Another area of debate is the fate of the unevangelized (i.e. those who have never had an opportunity to hear the Christian gospel), those who die in infancy, and intellectually disabled people. Some Protestants agree with Augustine that people in these categories will be damned to Hell for original sin, while others believe that God will make an exception in these cases.

A "significant minority" believe in the doctrine of conditional immortality, which teaches that those sent to Hell will not experience eternal conscious punishment, but instead will be extinguished or annihilated after a period of "limited conscious punishment". Prominent evangelical theologians who have adopted conditionalist beliefs include John Wenham, Edward Fudge, Clark Pinnock and John Stott (although the latter has described himself as an "agnostic" on the issue of annihilationism). Conditionalists typically reject the traditional concept of the immortality of the soul.

Some Protestants (such as George MacDonald, Karl Randall, Keith DeRose and Thomas Talbott), also, however, in a minority, believe that after serving their sentence in Gehenna, all souls are reconciled to God and admitted to heaven, or ways are found at the time of death of drawing all souls to repentance so that no "hellish" suffering is experienced. This view is often called Christian universalism—its conservative branch is more specifically called 'Biblical or Trinitarian Universalism'—and is not to be confused with Unitarian Universalism. See universal reconciliation, apocatastasis and the problem of Hell.

=== Theodicy: Allowance of evil ===
Theodicy can be said to be defense of God's goodness and omnipotence in view of the existence of evil. Specifically, Theodicy is a specific branch of theology and philosophy which attempts to reconcile belief in God with the perceived existence of evil. As such, theodicy can be said to attempt to justify the behaviour of God (at least insofar as God allows evil).

Responses to the problem of evil have sometimes been classified as defenses or theodicies. However, authors disagree on the exact definitions. Generally, a defense attempts to show that there is no logical incompatibility between the existence of evil and the existence of God. A defense need not argue that this is a probable or plausible explanation, only that the defense is logically possible. A defense attempts to answer the logical problem of evil.

A theodicy, on the other hand, is a more ambitious attempt to provide a plausible justification for the existence of evil. A theodicy attempts to answer the evidential problem of evil. Richard Swinburne maintains that it does not make sense to assume there are greater goods, unless we know what they are, i.e., we have a successful theodicy.

As an example, some authors see arguments including demons or the fall of man as not logically impossible but not very plausible considering our knowledge about the world. Thus they are seen as defenses but not good theodicies. C. S. Lewis writes in his book The Problem of Pain:

We can, perhaps, conceive of a world in which God corrected the results of this abuse of free will by His creatures at every moment: so that a wooden beam became soft as grass when it was used as a weapon, and the air refused to obey me if I attempted to set up in it the sound waves that carry lies or insults. But such a world would be one in which wrong actions were impossible, and in which, therefore, freedom of the will would be void; nay, if the principle were carried out to its logical conclusion, evil thoughts would be impossible, for the cerebral matter which we use in thinking would refuse its task when we attempted to frame them.

Another possible answer is that the world is corrupted due to the sin of mankind. Some answer that because of sin, the world has fallen from the grace of God, and is not perfect. Therefore, evils and imperfections persist because the world is fallen. William A. Dembski argues that the effects of Adam's sin recorded in the Book of Genesis were 'back-dated' by God, and hence applied to the earlier history of the universe.

Evil is sometimes seen as a test or trial for humans. Irenaeus of Lyons and more recently John Hick have argued that evil and suffering are necessary for spiritual growth. This is often combined with the free will argument by arguing that such spiritual growth requires free will decisions. A problem with this is that many evils do not seem to cause any kind of spiritual growth, or even permit it, as when a child is abused from birth and becomes, seemingly inevitably, a brutal adult.

The problem of evil is often phrased in the form: Why do bad things happen to good people?. Christianity teach that all people are inherently sinful due to the fall of man and original sin; for example, Calvinist theology follows a doctrine called federal headship, which argues that the first man, Adam, was the legal representative of the entire human race. A counterargument to the basic version of this principle is that an omniscient God would have predicted this, when he created the world, and an omnipotent God could have prevented it.

The Book of Isaiah clearly claims that God is the source of at least some natural disasters, but Isaiah does not attempt to explain the motivation behind the creation of evil. In contrast, the Book of Job is one of the most widely known formulations of the problem of evil in Western thought. In it, Satan challenges God regarding his servant Job, claiming that Job only serves God for the blessings and protection that he receives from him. God allows Satan to plague Job and his family in a number of ways, with the limitation that Satan may not take Job's life (but his children are killed). Job discusses this with three friends and questions God regarding his suffering which he finds to be unjust. God responds in a speech and then more than restores Job's prior health, wealth, and gives him new children.

Bart D. Ehrman argues that different parts of the Bible give different answers. One example is evil as punishment for sin or as a consequence of sin. Ehrman writes that this seems to be based on some notion of free will although this argument is never explicitly mentioned in the Bible. Another argument is that suffering ultimately achieves a greater good, possibly for persons other than the sufferer, that would not have been possible otherwise. The Book of Job offers two different answers: suffering is a test, and you will be rewarded later for passing it; another that God in his might chooses not to reveal his reasons. Ecclesiastes sees suffering as beyond human abilities to comprehend. Apocalyptic parts, including the New Testament, see suffering as due to cosmic evil forces, that God for mysterious reasons has given power over the world, but which will soon be defeated and things will be set right.

== Hamartiology: Sin ==
The Greek word in the New Testament that is translated in English as "sin" is hamartia, which literally means missing the target. 1 John 3:4 states: "Everyone who sins breaks the law; in fact, sin is lawlessness". Jesus clarified the law by defining its foundation: "Jesus replied: 'Love the Lord your God with all your heart and with all your soul and with all your mind.' This is the first and greatest commandment. And the second is like it: 'Love your neighbor as yourself.' All the Law and the Prophets hang on these two commandments." (Matthew 22:36–40)

Hamartiology (Greek: ἁμαρτία, hamartia, "missing the mark", "sin", + -λογια, -logia, "sayings" or "discourse") is the branch of Christian theology, more specifically, systematic theology, which is the study of sin with a view to articulating a doctrine of it.

Substantial branches of hamartiological understanding subscribe to the doctrine of original sin, which was taught by the Apostle Paul in Romans 5:12–19 and popularized by Saint Augustine. Augustine taught that all the descendants of Adam and Eve are guilty of Adam's sin without their own personal choice.

In contrast, Pelagius argued that humans enter life as essentially tabulae rasae. The fall that occurred when Adam and Eve disobeyed God was held by his group to have affected humankind only minimally. But few theologians continue to hold this hamartiological viewpoint.

A third branch of thinking takes an intermediate position, arguing that after the fall of Adam and Eve, humans are born impacted by sin such that they have very decided tendencies toward sinning (which by personal choice all accountable humans but Jesus soon choose to indulge).

The degree to which a Christian believes humanity is impacted by either a literal or metaphorical "fall" determines their understanding of related theological concepts like salvation, justification, and sanctification.

Christian views on sin are mostly understood as legal infraction or contract violation, and so salvation tends to be viewed in legal terms, similar to Jewish thinking.

=== Sin ===
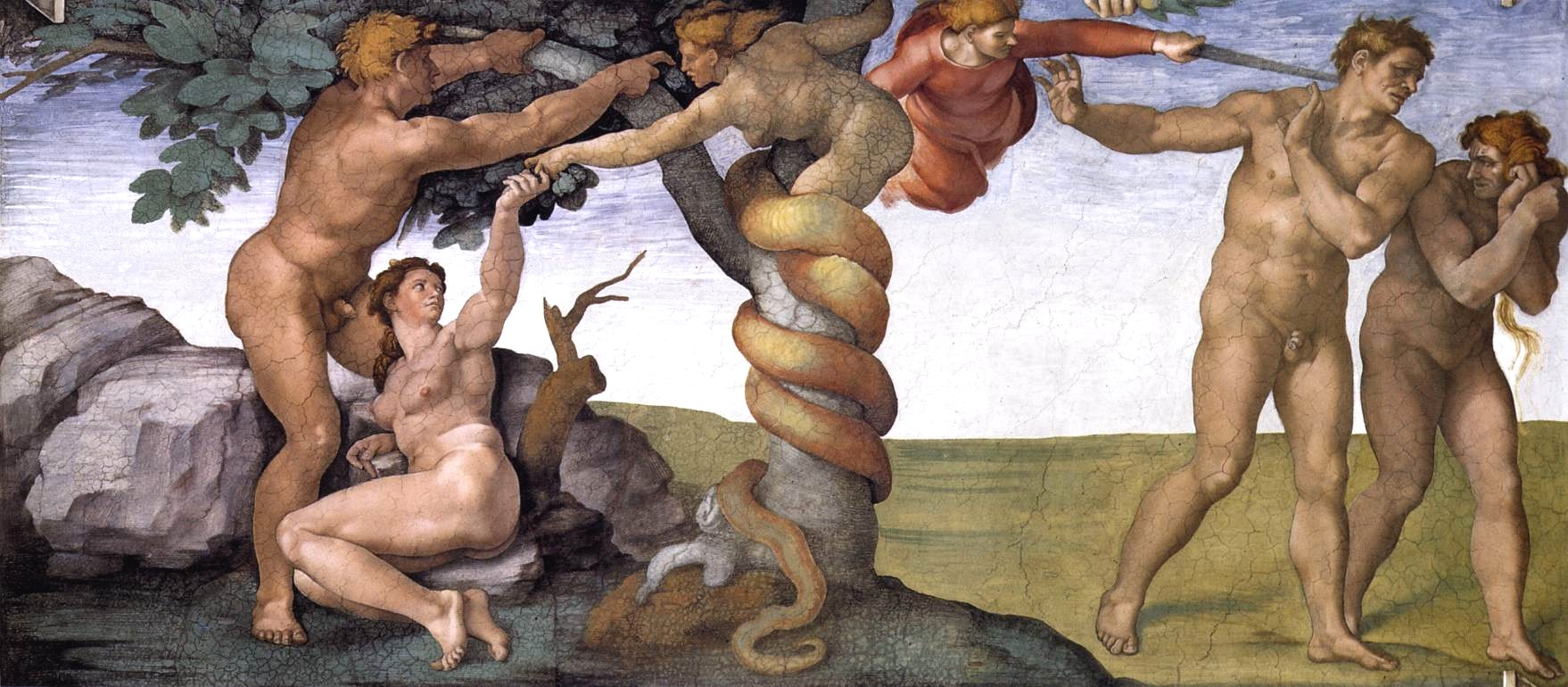
A Sistine Chapel fresco depicts the expulsion of Adam and Eve from the garden of Eden for their sin of eating from the fruit of the Tree of the Knowledge of Good and Evil.

In religion, sin is the concept of acts that violate a rule of God. The term sin may also refer to the state of having committed such a violation. Commonly, the moral code of conduct is decreed by a divine entity, i.e. Divine law.

Sin is often used to mean an action that is prohibited or considered wrong; in some religions (notably some sects of Christianity), sin can refer not only to physical actions taken, but also to thoughts and internalized motivations and feelings. Colloquially, any thought, word, or act considered immoral, shameful, harmful, or alienating might be termed "sinful".

An elementary concept of "sin" regards such acts and elements of Earthly living that one cannot take with them into transcendental living. Food, for example is not of transcendental living and therefore its excessive savoring is considered a sin. A more developed concept of "sin" deals with a distinction between sins of death (mortal sin) and the sins of human living (venial sin). In that context, mortal sins are said to have the dire consequence of mortal penalty, while sins of living (food, casual or informal sexuality, play, inebriation) may be regarded as essential spice for transcendental living, even though these may be destructive in the context of human living (obesity, infidelity).

Common ideas surrounding sin in various religions include:

- Punishment for sins, from other people, from God either in life or in afterlife, or from the Universe in general.
- The question of whether an act must be intentional to be sinful.
- The idea that one's conscience should produce guilt for a conscious act of sin.
- A scheme for determining the seriousness of the sin.
- Repentance from (expressing regret for and determining not to commit) sin, and atonement (repayment) for past deeds.
- The possibility of forgiveness of sins, often through communication with a deity or intermediary; in Christianity often referred to as salvation. Crime and justice are related secular concepts.

In Western Christianity, "sin is lawlessness" (1 John 3:4) and so salvation tends to be understood in legal terms, similar to Jewish law. Sin alienates the sinner from God. It has damaged, and completely severed, the relationship of humanity to God. That relationship can only be restored through acceptance of Jesus Christ and his death on the cross as a sacrifice for mankind's sin (see Salvation and Substitutionary atonement).

In Eastern Christianity, sin is viewed in terms of its effects on relationships, both among people and between people and God. Sin is seen as the refusal to follow God's plan, and the desire to be like God and thus in direct opposition to him (see the account of Adam and Eve in the Book of Genesis). To sin is to want control of one's destiny in opposition to the will of God, to do some rigid beliefs.

In the Russian variant of Eastern Orthodox Christianity, sin sometimes is regarded as any mistake made by people in their life. From this point of view every person is sinful because every person makes mistakes during his life. When person accuses others in sins he always must remember that he is also sinner and so he must have mercy for others remembering that God is also merciful to him and to all humanity.

=== Fall of man ===
The fall of man or simply the fall refers in Christian doctrine to the transition of the first humans from a state of innocent obedience to God, to a state of guilty disobedience to God. In the Book of Genesis chapter 2, Adam and Eve live at first with God in a paradise, but are then deceived or tempted by the serpent to eat fruit from the Tree of Knowledge of Good and Evil, which had been forbidden to them by God. After doing so they become ashamed of their nakedness, and God consequently expelled them from paradise. The fall is not mentioned by name in the Bible, but the story of disobedience and expulsion is recounted in both Testaments in different ways. The Fall can refer to the wider theological inferences for all humankind as a consequence of Eve and Adam's original sin. Examples include the teachings of Paul in Romans 5:12–19 and 1 Cor. 15:21–22.

Some Christian denominations believe the fall corrupted the entire natural world, including human nature, causing people to be born into original sin, a state from which they cannot attain eternal life without the gracious intervention of God. Protestants hold that Jesus' death was a "ransom" by which humanity was offered freedom from the sin acquired at the fall. In other religions, such as Judaism, Islam, and Gnosticism, the term "the fall" is not recognized and varying interpretations of the Eden narrative are presented.

Christianity interprets the fall in a number of ways. Traditional Christian theology accepts the teaching of St Paul in his letter to the Romans "For all have sinned and fall short of the glory of God" and of St John's Gospel that "God so loved the world that he sent his only son (Jesus Christ) that whoever believes in him should not perish, but have everlasting life".

The doctrine of original sin, as articulated by Augustine of Hippo's interpretation of Paul of Tarsus, provides that the fall caused a fundamental change in human nature, so that all descendants of Adam are born in sin, and can only be redeemed by divine grace. Sacrifice was the only means by which humanity could be redeemed after the fall. Jesus, who was without sin, died on the cross as the ultimate redemption for the sin of humankind.

=== Original sin ===
Thus, the moment Adam and Eve ate the fruit from the tree—which God had commanded them not to do—sinful death was born; it was an act of disobedience, thinking they could become like gods, that was the sin. Since Adam was the head of the human race, he is held responsible for the evil that took place, for which reason the fall of man is referred to as the "sin of Adam". This sin caused Adam and his descendants to lose unrestricted access to God Himself. The years of life were limited. "Wherefore, as by one man sin entered into the world, and death by sin; and so death passed upon all men, for that all have sinned" (Romans 5:12). In Christian theology, the death of Jesus on the cross is the atonement to the sin of Adam. "For as in Adam all die, even so in Christ shall all be made alive." (1 Corinthians 15:22). As a result of that act of Christ, all who put their trust in Christ alone now have unrestricted access to God through prayer and in presence.

Original sin, which Eastern Christians usually refer to as ancestral sin, is, according to a doctrine proposed in Christian theology, humanity's state of sin resulting from the fall of man. This condition has been characterized in many ways, ranging from something as insignificant as a slight deficiency, or a tendency toward sin yet without collective guilt, referred to as a "sin nature", to something as drastic as total depravity or automatic guilt by all humans through collective guilt.

Those who uphold the doctrine look to the teaching of Paul the Apostle in Romans 5:12–21 and 1 Corinthians 15:22 for its scriptural base, and see it as perhaps implied in Old Testament passages such as Psalm 51:5 and Psalm 58:3.

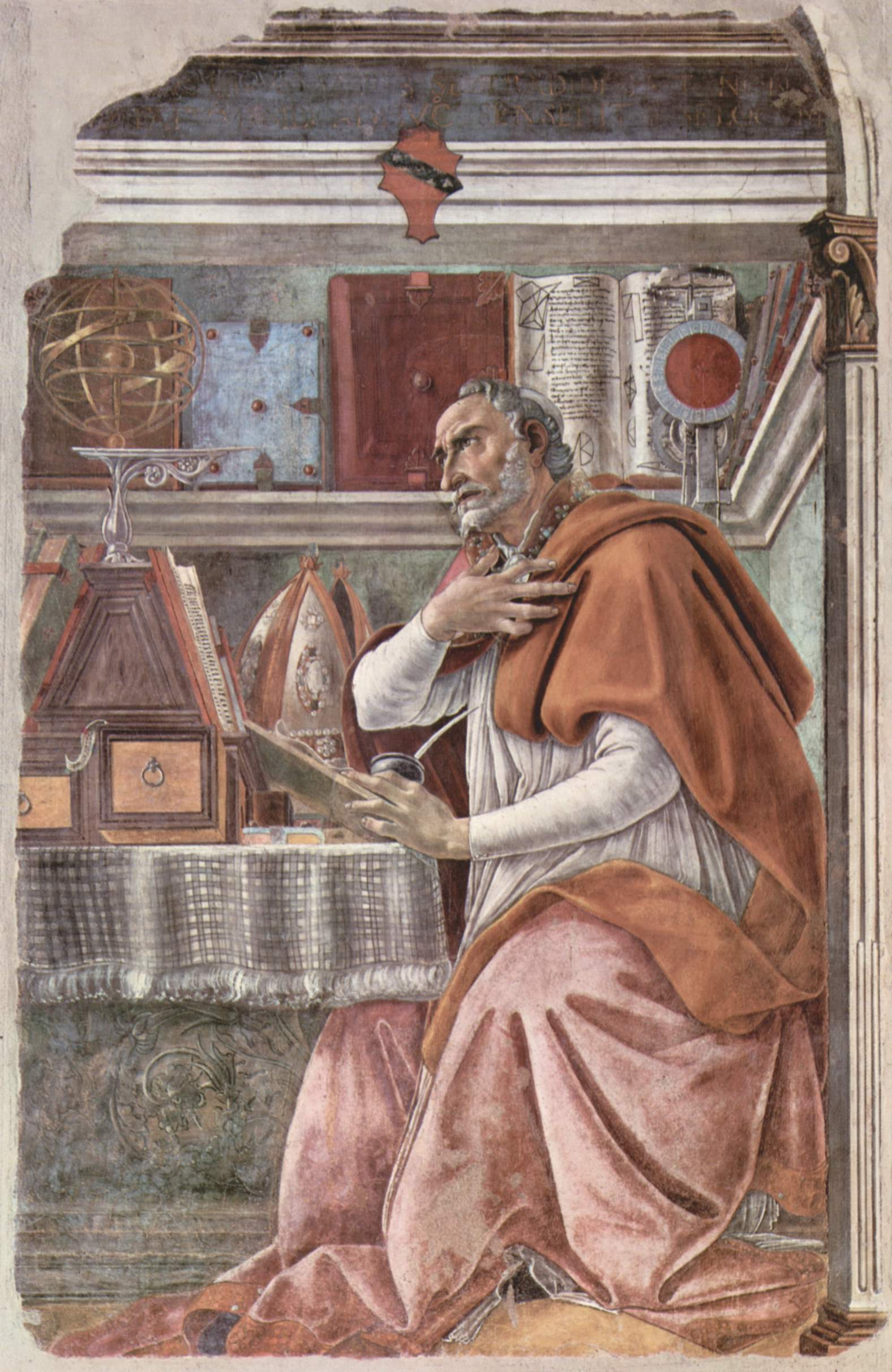
Augustine of Hippo wrote that original sin is transmitted by concupiscence and enfeebles freedom of the will without destroying it.

The Apostolic Fathers and the Apologists mostly dealt with topics other than original sin. The doctrine of original sin was first developed in 2nd-century Bishop of Lyon Irenaeus's struggle against Gnosticism. The Greek Fathers emphasized the cosmic dimension of the fall, namely that since Adam human beings are born into a fallen world, but held fast to belief that man, though fallen, is free. It was in the West that precise definition of the doctrine arose. Augustine of Hippo taught that original sin was both an act of foolishness (insipientia) and of pride and disobedience to the God of Adam and Eve. He thought it was a most subtle job to discern what came first: self-centeredness or failure in seeing truth. The sin would not have taken place, if satan had not sown into their senses "the root of evil" (radix Mali). The sin of Adam and Eve wounded their nature, affecting human intelligence and will, as well as affections and desires, including sexual desire. The consequences of the fall were transmitted to their descendants in the form of concupiscence, which is a metaphysical term, and not a psychological one. Thomas Aquinas explained Augustine's doctrine pointing out that the libido (concupiscence), which makes the original sin pass from parents to children, is not a libido actualis, i.e. sexual lust, but libido habitualis, i.e. a wound of the whole of human nature. Augustine insisted that concupiscence was not a being but bad quality, the privation of good or a wound. The bishop of Hippo admitted that sexual concupiscence (libido) might have been present in the perfect human nature in the paradise, and that only later it had become disobedient to human will as a result of the first couple's disobedience to God's will in the original sin. The original sin have made humanity a massa damnata (mass of perdition, condemned crowd). In Augustine's view (termed "Realism"), all of humanity was really present in Adam when he sinned, and therefore all have sinned. Original sin, according to Augustine, consists of the guilt of Adam which all humans inherit. As sinners, humans are utterly depraved in nature, lack the freedom to do good, and cannot respond to the will of God without divine grace. Grace is irresistible, results in conversion, and leads to perseverance.

Augustine's formulation of original sin was popular among Protestant reformers, such as Martin Luther and John Calvin, and also, within Roman Catholicism, in the Jansenist movement, but this movement was declared heretical by the Catholic Church. There are wide-ranging disagreements among Christian groups as to the exact understanding of the doctrine about a state of sinfulness or absence of holiness affecting all humans, even children, with some Christian groups denying it altogether.

The notion of original sin as interpreted by Augustine of Hippo was affirmed by the Protestant Reformer John Calvin. Calvin believed that humans inherit Adamic guilt and are in a state of sin from the moment of conception. This inherently sinful nature (the basis for the Calvinistic doctrine of "total depravity") results in a complete alienation from God and the total inability of humans to achieve reconciliation with God based on their own abilities. Not only do individuals inherit a sinful nature due to Adam's fall, but since he was the federal head and representative of the human race, all whom he represented inherit the guilt of his sin by imputation.

New Testament

The scriptural basis for the doctrine is found in two New Testament books by Paul the Apostle, Romans 5:12–21 and 1 Corinthians 15:22, in which he identifies Adam as the one man through whom death came into the world.

=== Total depravity ===
Total depravity (also called absolute inability and total corruption) is a theological doctrine that derives from the Augustinian concept of original sin. It is the teaching that, as a consequence of the fall of man, every person born into the world is enslaved to the service of sin and, apart from the efficacious or prevenient grace of God, is utterly unable to choose to follow God or choose to accept salvation as it is freely offered.

It is also advocated to various degrees by many Protestant confessions of faith and catechisms, including those of Lutheranism, Arminianism, and Calvinism.

Total depravity is the fallen state of man as a result of original sin. The doctrine of total depravity asserts that people are by nature not inclined or even able to love God wholly with heart, mind, and strength, but rather all are inclined by nature to serve their own will and desires and to reject the rule of God. Even religion and philanthropy are wicked to God to the extent that these originate from a human imagination, passion, and will and are not done to the glory of God. Therefore, in Reformed theology, if God is to save anyone He must predestine, call, elect individuals to salvation since fallen man does not want to, indeed is incapable of choosing God.

Total depravity does not mean, however, that people are as evil as possible. Rather, it means that even the good which a person may intend is faulty in its premise, false in its motive, and weak in its implementation; and there is no mere refinement of natural capacities that can correct this condition. Thus, even acts of generosity and altruism are in fact egoist acts in disguise. All good, consequently, is derived from God alone, and in no way through man.

=== Comparison among Protestants ===
This table summarizes three Protestant beliefs on depravity.

Topic	Calvinism	Lutheranism	Arminianism
Depravity and human will	For Calvin, in Total Depravity humanity possesses "free will", but it is in bondage to sin, until it is "transformed".	For Luther, in Total Depravity humanity possesses free-will/free choice in regard to "goods and possessions", but regarding "salvation or damnation" people are in bondage either to God or Satan."	For Arminius, in Depravity humanity possesses freedom from necessity, but not "freedom from sin" unless enabled by "prevenient grace".

== Soteriology: Salvation ==
Christian soteriology is the branch of Christian theology that deals with one's salvation. It is derived from the Greek sōtērion (salvation) (from sōtēr savior, preserver) + English -logy.

Atonement is a doctrine that describes how human beings can be reconciled to God. In Christian theology the atonement refers to the forgiving or pardoning of one's sin through the death of Jesus Christ by crucifixion, which made possible the reconciliation between God and creation. Within Christianity there are three main theories for how such atonement might work: the ransom theory, the satisfaction theory and the moral influence theory. Christian soteriology is unlike and not to be confused with collective salvation.

=== Traditional focus ===
Christian soteriology traditionally focuses on how God ends the separation people have from him due to sin by reconciling them with himself. (Rom. 5:10–11). Many Christians believe they receive the forgiveness of sins (Acts 2:38), life (Rom. 8:11), and salvation (1 Thess. 5:9) bought by Jesus through his innocent suffering, death, and resurrection from the dead three days later (Matt. 28).

Christ's death, resurrection, ascension, and sending of the Holy Spirit, is called The Paschal Mystery. Christ's human birth is called the Incarnation. Either or both are considered in different versions of soteriology.

While not neglecting the Paschal Mystery, many Christians believe salvation is brought through the Incarnation itself, in which God took on human nature so that humans could partake in the divine nature (2 Peter 1.4). As St. Athanasius put it, God became human so that we might become divine (St. Athanasius, De inc. 54, 3: PG 25, 192B.). This grace in Christ (1 Cor. 1:4) is received as a gift of God that cannot be merited by works done prior to one's conversion to Christianity (Eph. 2:8–9), which is brought about by hearing God's Word (Rom. 10:17) and harkening to it. This involves accepting Jesus Christ as the personal saviour and Lord over one's life.

=== Distinct schools ===
Protestant teaching, originating with Martin Luther, teaches that salvation is received by grace alone and that one's sole necessary response to this grace is faith alone. Older Christian teaching, as found in Catholic and Orthodox theology, is that salvation is received by grace alone, but that one's necessary response to this grace comprises both faith and works (James 2:24, 26; Rom 2:6–7; Gal 5:6).

=== Catholic soteriology ===
Human beings exists because God wanted to share His life with them. In this sense, every human being is God's child. In a fuller sense, to come to salvation is to be reconciled to God through Christ and to be united with His divine Essence via Theosis in the beatific vision of the Godhead. The graces of Christ's passion, death, and resurrection are found in the seven sacraments of the Catholic Church.

=== Comparison among Protestants ===
Protestant beliefs about salvation
This table summarizes the classical views of three Protestant beliefs about salvation.
Topic	Calvinism	Lutheranism	Arminianism
Human will	Total depravity: Humanity possesses "free will", but it is in bondage to sin, until it is "transformed".	Total depravity: Humanity possesses free will in regard to "goods and possessions", but is sinful by nature and unable to contribute to its own salvation.	Total depravity: Humanity possesses freedom from necessity, but not "freedom from sin" unless enabled by "prevenient grace".
Election	Unconditional election.	Unconditional election.	Conditional election in view of foreseen faith or unbelief.
Justification and atonement	Justification by faith alone. Various views regarding the extent of the atonement.	Justification for all men, completed at Christ's death and effective through faith alone.	Justification made possible for all through Christ's death, but only completed upon choosing faith in Jesus.
Conversion	Monergistic, through the means of grace, irresistible.	Monergistic, through the means of grace, resistible.	Synergistic, resistible due to the common grace of free will.
Perseverance and apostasy	Perseverance of the saints: the eternally elect in Christ will certainly persevere in faith.	Holy Spirit strengthens the faith of the believer through the proclamation of the Word and participation in the sacraments; falling away is possible through loss of faith or mortal sin.	Preservation is conditional upon continued faith in Christ; with the possibility of a final apostasy.

== Ecclesiology: Church ==
Ecclesiology (from Greek ἐκκλησίᾱ, ekklēsiā, "congregation, church"; and -λογία, -logia) is the study of the theological understanding of the Christian church, including the institutional structure, sacraments and practices (especially the worship of God) thereof. Specific areas of concern include the church's role in salvation, its origin, its relationship to the historical Christ, its discipline, its destiny, and its leadership. Ecclesiology is, therefore, the study of the church as a thing in, and of, itself.

Different ecclesiologies give shape to very different institutions. Thus, in addition to describing a broad discipline of theology, ecclesiology may be used in the specific sense of a particular church or denomination's character, self-described or otherwise. This is the sense of the word in such phrases as Roman Catholic ecclesiology, Lutheran ecclesiology, and ecumenical ecclesiology.

Issues addressed by ecclesiology

Ecclesiology asks the questions:

- Who is the Church? Is it a visible or earthly corporation or a unified, visible society—a "church" in the sense of a specific denomination or institution, for instance? Or is it the body of all believing Christians (see invisible church) regardless of their denominational differences and disunity? What is the relationship between living Christians and departed Christians (the "cloud of witnesses")—do they (those on Earth and those in Heaven) constitute together the Church?
- Must one join a church? That is, what is the role of corporate worship in the spiritual lives of believers? Is it in fact necessary? Can salvation be found outside of formal membership in a given faith community, and what constitutes "membership?" (Baptism? Formal acceptance of a creed? Regular participation?)
- What is the authority of the Church? Who gets to interpret the doctrines of the Church? Is the organizational structure itself, either in a single corporate body, or generally within the range of formal church structures, an independent vehicle of revelation or of God's grace? Or is the Church's authority instead dependent on and derivative of a separate and prior divine revelation external to the organization, with individual institutions being "the Church" only to the extent that they teach this message? For example, is the Bible a written part of a wider revelation entrusted to the Church as faith community, and therefore to be interpreted within that context? Or is the Bible the revelation itself, and the Church is to be defined as a group of people who claim adherence to it?
- What does the Church do? What are the sacraments, divine ordinances, and liturgies, in the context of the Church, and are they part of the Church's mission to preach the Gospel? What is the comparative emphasis and relationship between worship service, spiritual formation, and mission, and is the Church's role to create disciples of Christ or some other function? Is the Eucharist the defining element of the rest of the sacramental system and the Church itself, or is it secondary to the act of preaching? Is the Church to be understood as the vehicle for salvation, or the salvific presence in the world, or as a community of those already "saved?"
- How should the Church be governed? What was the mission and authority of the Apostles, and is this handed down through the sacraments today? What are the proper methods of choosing clergy such as bishops and priests, and what is their role within the context of the Church? Is an ordained clergy necessary? * Who are the leaders of a church? Must there be a policy-making board of "leaders" within a church and what are the qualifications for this position, and by what process do these members become official, ordained "leaders"? Must leaders and clergy be "ordained", and is this possible only by those who have been ordained by others?

=== Ecclesiastical polity ===
Ecclesiastical polity is the operational and governance structure of a church or Christian denomination. It also denotes the ministerial structure of the church and the authority relationships between churches. Polity is closely related to Ecclesiology, the study of doctrine and theology relating to church organization.

Issues of church governance appear in the first chapters of the Acts of the Apostles; the first act recorded after the ascension is the election of Matthias to replace Judas Iscariot. Over the years a system of episcopal polity developed.

During the Protestant Reformation, arguments were made that the New Testament prescribed structures quite different from that of the Catholic Church of the day, and different Protestant bodies used different types of polity. It was during this period that Richard Hooker wrote Of the Laws of Ecclesiastical Polity to defend the polity of the Church of England against the Puritans.

Episcopal polity is used in several closely related senses. Most commonly it refers to the field of church governance in the abstract, but it also can refer to the governance of a particular Christian body. In this sense it is used as a term in civil law. "Polity" is sometimes used as a shorthand for the church governance structure itself.

Though each church or denomination has its own characteristic structure, there are three general types of polity.

Episcopal polity

Churches having episcopal polity are governed by bishops. The title bishop comes from the Greek word episkopos, which literally translates into overseer. In regard to Catholicism, bishops have authority over the diocese, which is both sacramental and political; as well as performing ordinations, confirmations, and consecrations, the bishop supervises the clergy of the diocese and represents the diocese both secularly and in the hierarchy of church governance.

Bishops in this system may be subject to higher ranking bishops (variously called archbishops, metropolitans or patriarchs, depending upon the tradition; see also Bishop for further explanation of the varieties of bishops.) They also meet in councils or synods. These synods, subject to presidency by higher ranking bishops, may govern the dioceses which are represented in the council, though the synod may also be purely advisory.

Note that the presence of the office of "bishop" within a church is not proof of episcopal polity. For example, in Mormonism, the "bishop" occupies the office that in an Anglican church would be occupied by a priest.

Also, episcopal polity is not usually a simple chain of command. Instead, some authority may be held, not only by synods and colleges of bishops, but by lay and clerical councils. Further, patterns of authority are subject to a wide variety of historical rights and honors which may cut across simple lines of authority.

Episcopal polity is the predominant pattern in Catholic, Eastern Orthodox, Oriental Orthodox and Anglican churches. It is also common in Methodist and Lutheran churches. Among churches with episcopal polity, different theories of autonomy are expressed. So in Roman Catholicism the church is viewed as a single polity headed by the pope, but in Eastern Orthodoxy the various churches retain formal autonomy but are held to be unified by shared doctrine and conciliarity—that is, the authority of councils, such as ecumenical councils, Holy Synods and the former standing council, the Endemusa Synod.

Presbyterian polity

Many Reformed churches, notably those in the Presbyterian and Continental Reformed traditions, are governed by a hierarchy of councils. The lowest level council governs a single local church and is called the session or consistory; its members are called elders. The minister of the church (sometimes referred to as a teaching elder) is a member of and presides over the session; lay representatives (ruling elders or, informally, just elders) are elected by the congregation. The session sends representatives to the next level higher council, called the presbytery or classis. In some Presbyterian churches there are higher level councils (synods or general assemblies). Each council has authority over its constituents, and the representatives at each level are expected to use their own judgment. Hence higher level councils act as courts of appeal for church trials and disputes, and it is not uncommon to see rulings and decisions overturned.

Presbyterian polity is, of course, the characteristic governance of Presbyterian churches, and also of churches in the Continental Reformed tradition. Elements of presbyterian polity are also found in other churches. For example, in the Episcopal Church in the United States of America governance by bishops is paralleled by a system of deputies, who are lay and clerical representatives elected by parishes and, at the national level, by the dioceses. Legislation in the general convention requires the separate consent of the bishops and of the deputies.

Note that, in episcopal polity, a presbyter refers to a priest.

Congregational polity

Congregationalist polity dispenses with titled positions such as bishop as a requirement of church structure. The local congregation rules itself, though local leaders and councils may be appointed.

Members may be sent from the congregation to associations that are sometimes identified with the church bodies formed by Lutherans, Presbyterians, Anglicans, and other non-congregational Protestants. The similarity is deceptive, however, because the congregationalist associations do not exercise control over their members (other than ending their membership in the association). Many congregationalist churches are completely independent in principle. One major exception is Ordination, where even congregationalist churches often invite members of the vicinage or association to ordain their called pastor.

It is a principle of congregationalism that ministers do not govern congregations by themselves. They may preside over the congregation, but it is the congregation which exerts its authority in the end.

Congregational polity is sometimes called "Baptist polity", as it is the characteristic polity of Baptist churches.

=== Priesthood ===
- Laity, Priesthood of all believers
- Clergy, Bishop, Priest, Pastor, Elder

=== Missiology ===
Missiology is the interdisciplinary study of Christian mission history and methodology, emerging as an academic discipline in the 19th century. It examines the missionary work of various Christian denominations, focusing on themes like inculturation, contextualization, and interfaith relations, while engaging with social sciences. Notable figures include Alexander Duff and Gustav Warneck, who were pivotal in establishing missiology as a formal field of study.

=== Sacrament ===
A sacrament, as defined in Hexam's Concise Dictionary of Religion, is what Roman Catholics believe to be "a rite in which God is uniquely active". Augustine of Hippo defined a Christian sacrament as "a visible sign of an invisible reality". The Anglican Book of Common Prayer speaks of them as "an outward and visible sign of an inward and invisible Grace." Examples of sacraments would be Baptism and the Eucharist." Therefore a sacrament is a religious symbol or often a rite which conveys divine grace, blessing, or sanctity upon the believer who participates in it, or a tangible symbol which represents an intangible reality. As defined above, an example would be baptism in water, representing (and conveying) the grace of the gift of the Holy Spirit, the Forgiveness of Sins, and membership into the Church. Anointing with holy anointing oil is another example which is often synonymous with receiving the Holy Spirit and salvation. Another way of looking at Sacraments is that they are an external and physical sign of the conferral of Sanctifying Grace.

Throughout the Christian faith, views concerning which rites are sacramental, that is conferring sanctifying grace, and what it means for an external act to be sacramental vary widely. Other religious traditions also have what might be called "sacraments" in a sense, though not necessarily according to the Christian meaning of the term.

General definitions and terms

In the majority of Western Christianity, the generally accepted definition of a sacrament is that it is an outward sign that conveys spiritual grace through Christ. Christian churches, denominations, and sects are divided regarding the number and operation of the sacraments. Sacraments are generally held to have been instituted by Jesus Christ, although in some cases this point is debated. They are usually administered by the clergy to a recipient or recipients, and are generally understood to involve visible and invisible components. The invisible component (manifested inwardly) is understood to be brought about by the action of the Holy Spirit, God's grace working in the sacrament's participants, while the visible (or outward) component entails the use of such things as water, oil, and bread and wine that is blessed or consecrated; the laying-on-of-hands; or a particularly significant covenant that is marked by a public benediction (such as with marriage or absolution of sin in the reconciliation of a penitent).

As defined by the Roman Catholic Church, recognised by the Eastern Orthodox churches, Oriental Orthodox, (though these two do not categorically define the number), and Independent Catholic and Old Catholic Church.

The Orthodox Churches (Eastern and Oriental) typically do not limit the number of sacraments, viewing all encounters with reality in life as sacramental in some sense, and their acknowledgement of the number of sacraments at seven as an innovation of convenience not found in the Church Fathers. It came into use, although infrequently, later on from later encounters with the West and its Sacramental Theology. Other denominations and traditions, both in eastern and western Christianity may affirm only Baptism and Eucharist as sacraments, these include many of the Protestant denominations and some of the Old Believers in the Orthodox communion, some of whom reject all sacraments except Baptism.

Since some post-Reformation denominations do not regard clergy as having a classically sacerdotal or priestly function, they avoid the term "sacrament", preferring the terms "sacerdotal function", "ordinance", or "tradition". This belief invests the efficacy of the ordinance in the obedience and participation of the believer and the witness of the presiding minister and the congregation. This view stems from a highly developed concept of the priesthood of all believers. In this sense, the believer himself or herself performs the sacerdotal role.

==== Eucharist ====
- Transsubstantiation (Roman Catholicism)
- Anglican Eucharistic theology
- Sacramental Union (Lutheran)

Eucharist, also called Communion, or the Lord's Supper, and other names, is a Christian sacrament or ordinance, generally considered to be a re-enactment of the Last Supper, the final meal that Jesus Christ shared with his disciples before his arrest and eventual crucifixion. The consecration of bread and a cup within the rite recalls the moment at the Last Supper when Jesus gave his disciples bread, saying, "This is my body", and wine, saying, "This is my blood".

There are different interpretations of the significance of the Eucharist, but "there is more of a consensus among Christians about the meaning of the Eucharist than would appear from the confessional debates over the sacramental presence, the effects of the Eucharist, and the proper auspices under which it may be celebrated."

The phrase "the Eucharist" may refer not only to the rite but also to the consecrated bread (leavened or unleavened) and wine (or, in some Protestant denominations, unfermented grape juice) used in the rite, and, in this sense, communicants may speak of "receiving the Eucharist", as well as "celebrating the Eucharist".

Eucharist is from Greek εὐχαριστία (eucharistia), meaning thanksgiving. The verb εὐχαριστῶ, the usual word for "to thank" in the Septuagint and the New Testament, is found in the major texts concerning the Lord's Supper, including the earliest:

For I received from the Lord what I also delivered to you, that the Lord Jesus on the night when he was betrayed took bread, and when he had given thanks, he broke it, and said, "This is my body which is for you. Do this in remembrance of me." (1 Corinthians 11:23–24)

The Lord's Supper (Κυριακὸν δεῖπνον) derives from 1 Corinthians 11:20–21.

When you come together, it is not the Lord's Supper you eat, for as you eat, each of you goes ahead without waiting for anybody else. One remains hungry, another gets drunk.

Communion is a translation; other translations are "participation", "sharing", "fellowship" of the Greek κοινωνία (koinōnía) in 1 Corinthians 10:16. The King James Version has:

The cup of blessing which we bless, is it not the communion of the blood of Christ? The bread which we break, is it not the communion of the body of Christ?

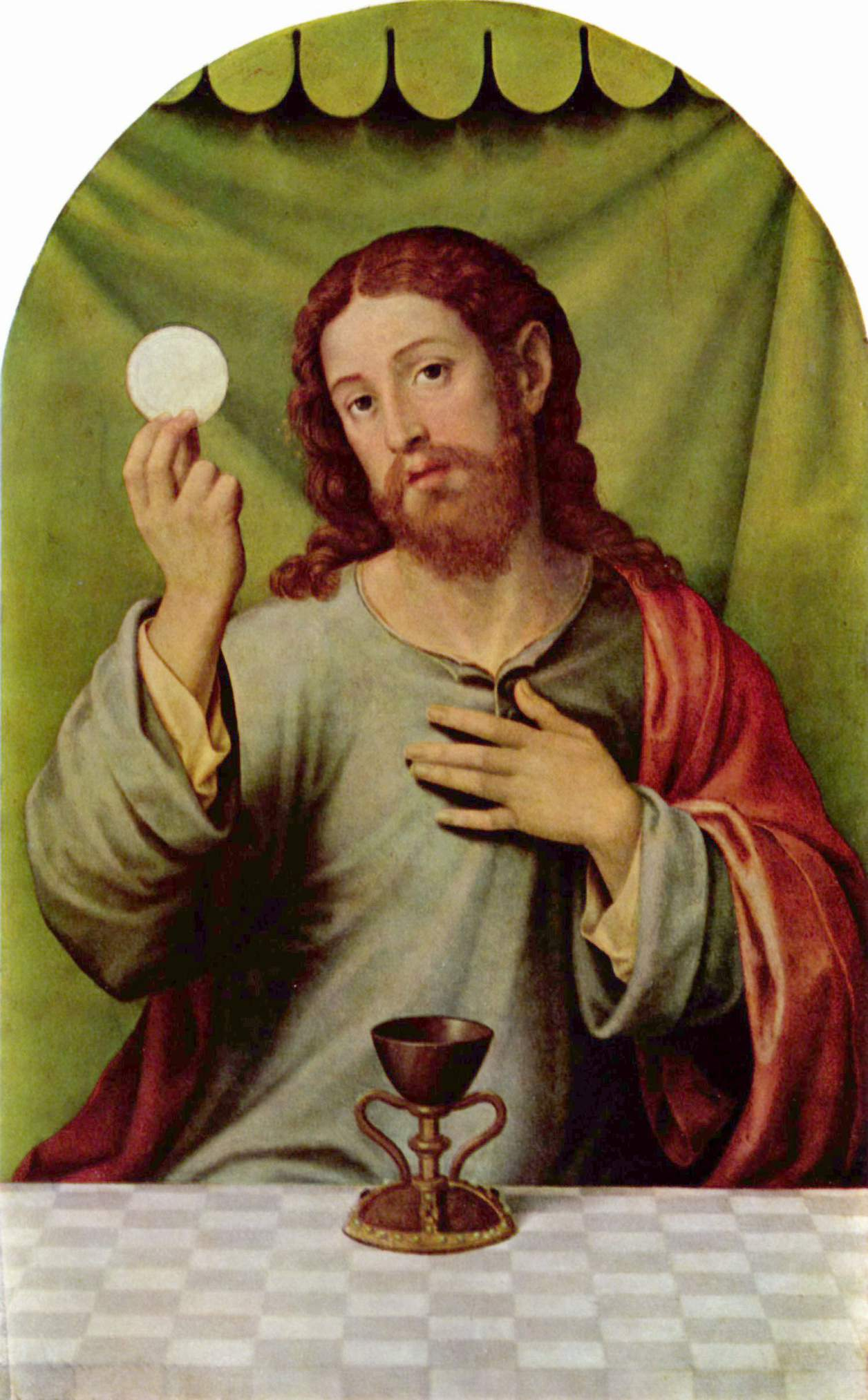
Christ with the Eucharist by Vicente Juan Masip, 16th century

The Last Supper appears in all three Synoptic Gospels: Matthew, Mark, and Luke; and in the First Epistle to the Corinthians, while the last-named of these also indicates something of how early Christians celebrated what Paul the Apostle called the Lord's Supper. As well as the Eucharistic dialogue in John chapter 6.

In his First Epistle to the Corinthians (c. 54–55), Paul the Apostle gives the earliest recorded description of Jesus's Last Supper: "The Lord Jesus on the night when he was betrayed took bread, and when he had given thanks, he broke it, and said, 'This is my body which is for you. Do this in remembrance of me.' In the same way also the cup, after supper, saying, 'This cup is the new covenant in my blood. Do this, as often as you drink it, in remembrance of me'."

The synoptic gospels, first Mark, and then Matthew and Luke, depict Jesus as presiding over the Last Supper. References to Jesus's body and blood foreshadow his crucifixion, and he identifies them as a new covenant. In the gospel of John, the account of the Last Supper has no mention of Jesus taking bread and wine and speaking of them as his body and blood; instead it recounts his humble act of washing the disciples' feet, the prophecy of the betrayal, which set in motion the events that would lead to the cross, and his long discourse in response to some questions posed by his followers, in which he went on to speak of the importance of the unity of the disciples with him and each other.

The expression The Lord's Supper, derived from St. Paul's usage in 1 Corinthians 11:17–34, may have originally referred to the Agape feast, the shared communal meal with which the Eucharist was originally associated. The Agape feast is mentioned in Jude 12. But The Lord's Supper is now commonly used in reference to a celebration involving no food other than the sacramental bread and wine.

The Didache (Greek: teaching) is an early Church order, including, among other features, instructions for baptism and the Eucharist. Most scholars date it to the early 2nd century, and distinguish in it two separate Eucharistic traditions, the earlier tradition in chapter 10 and the later one preceding it in chapter 9. The Eucharist is mentioned again in chapter 14.

Ignatius of Antioch, one of the Apostolic Fathers and a direct disciple of the Apostle John, mentions the Eucharist as "the flesh of our Saviour Jesus Christ", and Justin Martyr speaks of it as more than a meal: "the food over which the prayer of thanksgiving, the word received from Christ, has been said ... is the flesh and blood of this Jesus who became flesh ... and the deacons carry some to those who are absent."

Eucharistic theology

Many Christian denominations classify the Eucharist as a sacrament. Some Protestants prefer to call it an ordinance, viewing it not as a specific channel of divine grace but as an expression of faith and of obedience to Christ.

Most Christians, even those who deny that there is any real change in the elements used, recognize a special presence of Christ in this rite, though they differ about exactly how, where, and when Christ is present. Roman Catholicism and Eastern Orthodoxy teach that the consecrated elements truly become the body and blood of Jesus Christ. Transubstantiation is the metaphysical explanation given by Roman Catholics as to how this transformation occurs. Lutherans believe that the body and blood of Jesus are present "in, with and under" the forms of bread and wine, a concept known as the sacramental union. The Reformed churches, following the teachings of John Calvin, believe in a spiritual (or "pneumatic") real presence of Christ by the power of the Holy Spirit and received by faith. Anglicans adhere to a range of views although the Anglican church officially teaches the real presence. Some Christians reject the concept of the real presence, believing that the Eucharist is only a memorial of the death of Christ.

The Baptism, Eucharist and Ministry document of the World Council of Churches, attempting to present the common understanding of the Eucharist on the part of the generality of Christians, describes it as "essentially the sacrament of the gift which God makes to us in Christ through the power of the Holy Spirit", "Thanksgiving to the Father", "Anamnesis or Memorial of Christ", "the sacrament of the unique sacrifice of Christ, who ever lives to make intercession for us", "the sacrament of the body and blood of Christ, the sacrament of his real presence", "Invocation of the Spirit", "Communion of the Faithful", and "Meal of the Kingdom".

==== Baptism ====
- Infant baptism
- Believer's baptism

== Eschatology: Final destiny of humanity ==
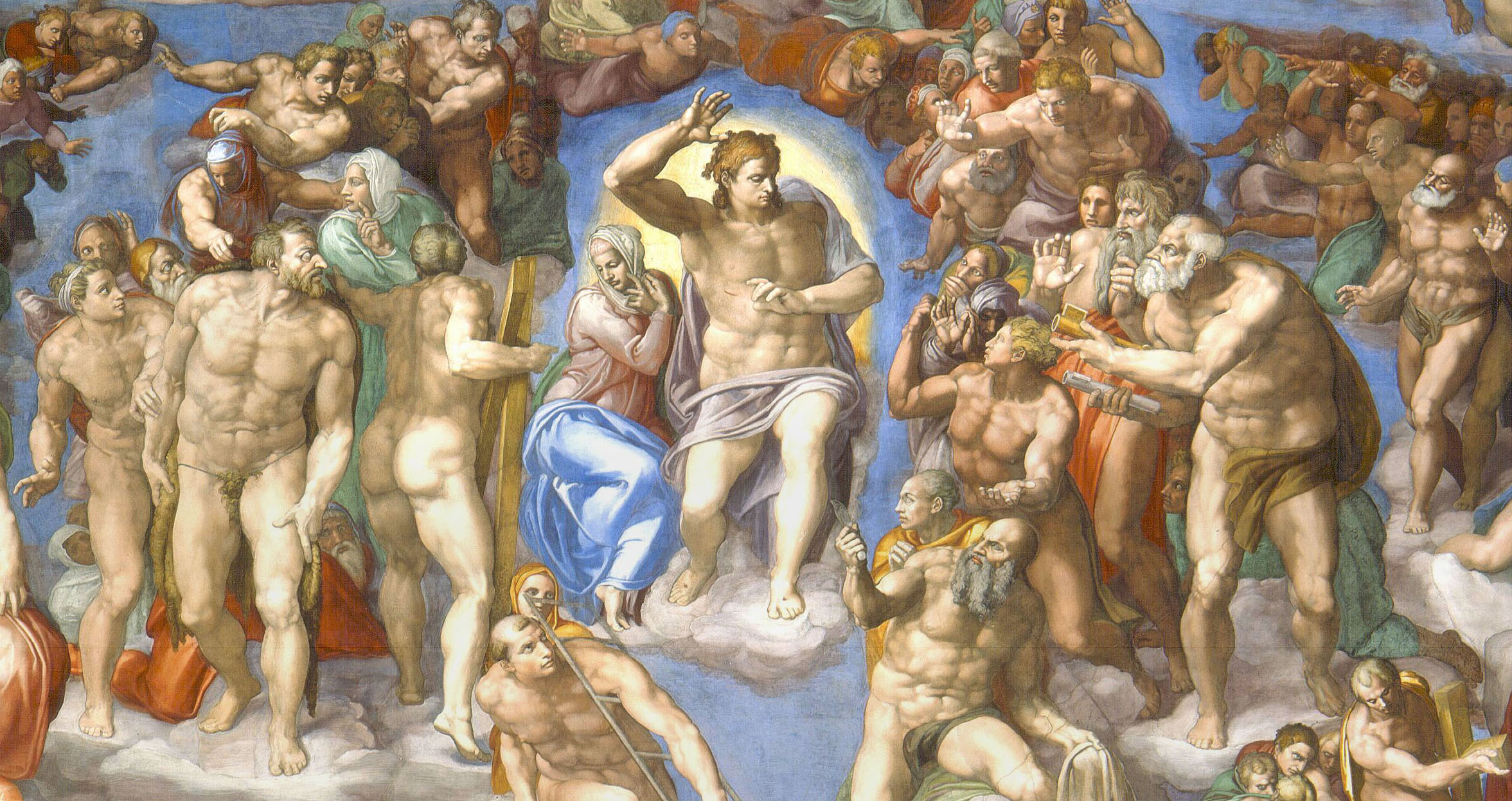
Detail from the Last Judgement by Michelangelo

Eschatology (derived from the Greek roots ἔσχατος "last" and λογία "discourse", "study") is the study of the end of things, whether the end of an individual life, the end of the age, or the end of the world. Broadly speaking, it is the study of the destiny of man as revealed in the Bible.

Eschatology is concerned with the afterlife, beginning with death and the personal judgment which follows the death of the individual. Eschatology also concerns itself with events which are said to happen at the end of this age: the return of Jesus, the resurrection of the dead, the Rapture, the Tribulation, and following these things, the Millennium, or thousand years of peace, which has been interpreted both literally and symbolically. Finally, eschatology concerns itself with the end of the world and its associated events: the Last Judgment; the banishment of Death, Hades, and Satan and his followers to the Lake of Fire; and the creation of a new heaven and earth.

Eschatology is an ancient branch of study in Christian theology, with study of the "last things" and the Second Coming of Christ first touched on by Ignatius of Antioch (c. 35 – c. 107 AD), then given more consideration by the Christian apologist in Rome, Justin Martyr (c. 100 – c. 165). Treatment of eschatology continued in the West in the teachings of the influential theologian of Roman North Africa, Tertullian (c. 160 – c. 225), and was given fuller reflection and speculation soon after in the East by the master theologian, Origen (c. 185 – c. 254).

Martin Luther, John Calvin, and other 16th-century reformers wrote long tracts about the End Times, but interest in eschatology dwindled after the Reformation until the late 19th century, when it became popular in the Reformed, Pentecostal, and Evangelical sects. It was increasingly recognized as a formal division of theological study during the 20th century.

The second coming of Christ is the central event in Christian eschatology. Most Christians believe that death and suffering will continue to exist until Christ's return. Others believe that suffering will gradually be eliminated prior to his coming, and that the elimination of injustice is our part in preparing for that event.

=== Approaches to interpretation ===
- The Preterist approach (from the Latin praeteritus "gone by") seeks parallels between Revelation and the events of the 1st century, such as Herod's attempt to kill the infant Christ, the struggle of Christianity to survive the persecutions of Judaism and the Roman Empire, the fall of Jerusalem in 70 AD, the desecration of the temple in the same year, and the growth of Christianity from a sect within Judaism to an independent religion.
- The Historicist method takes a broader historical approach and seeks parallels between Revelation and the major people and events of history, especially those which have had a direct effect on Israel and the Church.
- The Futurist method approaches Revelation as chiefly referring to events that have not yet come to pass but will take place at the end of this age and at the end of the world. The main focus is the return of Christ.
- The Idealist model, also known as Spiritualist or Symbolic model, approaches the images of Revelation as symbols representing larger themes and concepts, rather than actual people and events. It sees in Revelation an allegorical representation of the ongoing struggle of the forces of light and darkness, and the ultimate triumph of good over evil.

== See also ==
- Attributes of God
- Biblical hermeneutics
- Biblical law in Christianity
- Christian anthropology
- Christian philosophy
- Christology
- Divine providence
- Divine revelation
- Ecclesiology
- Eschatology
- Eternal life
- God in Christianity
- Hamartiology
- Lists of Christian theologians
- Missiology
- Moral theology
- New Testament theology
- Old Testament theology
- Outline of theology
- Paterology
- Pneumatology
- Sacraments
- Soteriology
- Theodicy
- Trinity

== Bibliography ==
- Berkhof, Louis. (1996). The History of Christian Doctrine. Banner of Truth. ISBN 0-85151-005-1.
- Demarest, Bruce A. (1997). The Cross and Salvation: The Doctrine of Salvation. Crossway Books. ISBN 978-0-89107-937-8.
- Edwards, Mark (2009). Catholicity and Heresy in the Early Church. Ashgate. ISBN 9780754662914.
- Hill, Jonathan (2003). The History of Christian Thought. Lion Books. ISBN 0-7459-5093-0.
  - Volume 1: The Living God (1992). ISBN 0-06-066363-4
  - Volume 2: The Word of Life (1992). ISBN 0-06-066364-2
  - Volume 3: Life in the Spirit (1994). ISBN 0-06-066362-6
- Kang, Paul ChulHong (2006). Justification: The Imputation of Christ's Righteousness from Reformation Theology to the American Great Awakening and the Korean Revivals. New York: Peter Lang. ISBN 978-0-8204-8605-5.
- Lange, Lyle W. (2005). God So Loved the World: A Study of Christian Doctrine. Milwaukee: Northwestern Publishing House. ISBN 978-0-8100-1744-3.
- Luther, Martin (1823). Martin Luther on the Bondage of the Will: Written in Answer to the Diatribe of Erasmus on Free-will. First Pub. in the Year of Our Lord 1525. Translated by Cole, Henry. London: T. Bensley.
- McGrath, Alister (7 March 2011). The Christian Theology Reader. Wiley. ISBN 978-0470654842.
- McGrath, Alister (4 October 2010). Christian Theology: An Introduction. Wiley. ISBN 978-1444335149.
- Muller, Richard A. (2012). Calvin and the Reformed Tradition: On the Work of Christ and the Order of Salvation. Baker Books. ISBN 978-1-4412-4254-9.
- Olson, Roger E. (2009). Arminian Theology: Myths and Realities. Downers Grove: InterVarsity Press.
- Rupp, Ernest Gordon; Watson, Philip Saville (1969). Luther and Erasmus: Free Will and Salvation. Louisville: Westminster John Knox Press. ISBN 978-0-664-24158-2.
- Stanglin, Keith D.; McCall, Thomas H. (15 November 2012). Jacob Arminius: Theologian of Grace. New York: OUP USA. ISBN 978-0-19-975567-7.
