= Trinitarianism in the Church Fathers =

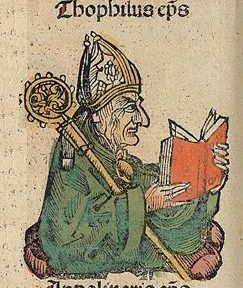
Theophilus of Antioch is the earliest Church father documented to have used the word "Trinity" to refer to God.

Debate exists as to whether the earliest Church Fathers in Christian history believed in the doctrine of the Trinity – the Christian doctrine that God the Father, the Son (Jesus Christ) and the Holy Spirit are three distinct persons sharing one homoousion (essence).

Some of the evidence used to support an early belief in the Trinity consists of triadic statements (referring to the Father, Son and Holy Spirit) from the New Testament and from the writings of the Church Fathers. The view that the Son was "of the substance of the Father, God of God [...] very God of very God" was formally ratified at the First Council of Nicaea in 325 AD. The Holy Spirit was included at the First Council of Constantinople (381 AD), which formally ratified the doctrine of the relationship between the Father, Son and Holy Spirit as one substance (ousia) and three co-equal persons (hypostaseis).

== Introduction ==
Some Trinitarians say the doctrine of the Trinity was revealed during the time that the New Testament was written; (Note: There is no scholarly consensus on when the New Testament was written, though most estimates fall within the 1st and 2nd centuries AD; the New Oxford Annotated Bible states that "Scholars generally agree that the Gospels were written forty to sixty years after the death of Jesus. They thus do not present eyewitness or contemporary accounts of Jesus's life and teaching.") others state that it was revealed in the Patristic period (c. 100–451/787 AD). Nontrinitarians, on the other hand, generally state that the traditional doctrine of the Trinity did not exist until centuries after the end of the New Testament period. Some Trinitarians agree with this, seeing a development over time towards a true understanding of the Trinity. Trinitarians sometimes refer to Christian belief about God before the traditional statements on the Trinity as unsophisticated, 'naive', or 'incipient Trinitarianism', and that early Christians were 'proto-Trinitarian, partially Trinitarian'. Unitarians and some Trinitarians state that this means that those early Christians were not Trinitarians.

Expressions which link together the name of the Father, the Son, and the Holy Spirit occurred very early in the History of the Christian Church. These are sometimes taken as expressions about the Trinity. Other times, they are referred to more generally as 'triadic'. It is stated by some that "these passages cannot immediately be taken as evidence of the belief in the co-substantial unity of God; names may be conjoined for any number of reasons (e.g. unity in greeting, unity of purpose, etc.) so even the use of a threefold formula cannot be conclusive".

Two examples appear in the New Testament: 2 Corinthians 13:13 and Matthew 28:19. The context of 2 Corinthians 13:14 (verse 13 in the Vulgate and the NRSV), which is the close of a letter, suggests the church's conjunction of the Father, Son and Holy Spirit may have originated as a doxological formula; while the context of Matthew 28:19, the Great Commission, shows that the verbal conjunction of the Father, Son, and Holy Spirit was used early on as a baptismal formula. Unitarians hold that "the Father, Son and Holy Spirit are mentioned together [in the New Testament] in the same context, but not in any way that suggests they are all distinct persons who together comprise the totality of God"; a "literary triad does not equate to an ontological triunity".

This triadic pattern is even more marked in the glimpses available of the early Church's liturgy and day-to-day catechetical practice. Even so, some have said that the "indications from the apostolic and sub-apostolic writers are that [their] triadic formulas [...] do not carry the same significance as post-Nicene triadic formulas". The oldest extant work in which the word "Trinity" itself (Greek Trias, triados) is used is Theophilus of Antioch's 2nd-century To Autolycus. There it is used to refer to God, his word and his wisdom. (Note: "...the three days before the luminaries were created are types of the Trinity, God, his Word, and his Wisdom".) The view that the Son was "of the essence of the Father, God of God [...] very God of very God" was formally ratified at the First Council of Nicaea in 325 AD. The Holy Spirit was included at the First Council of Constantinople (381 AD), where the relationship between the Father, Son and Holy Spirit as one substance (ousia) and three co-equal persons (hypostaseis) was formally ratified.

== First century ==
The Didache is thought to use the Gospel of Matthew (although a minority of scholars argue they are independent of one another or that it is Matthew that uses the Didache) only and no other known Gospel, and thus it must have been written before the four-Gospel canon had become widespread in the churches, i.e. before the second half of the 2nd century when Tatian produced the Diatessaron. Given its literary dependence on the Gospel of Matthew, it is not surprising that the Didache follows the Gospel of Matthew in designating a triadic formula as the baptismal formula:

After the foregoing instructions, baptize in the name of the Father, and of the Son, and of the Holy Spirit, in living [running] water [...]. If you have neither, pour water three times on the head, in the name of the Father, and of the Son, and of the Holy Spirit.

— Didache 7:1

Scholars such as Clayton N. Jefford have noted that Jesus is not "ever specifically given a designation of divinity within the text. He is simply called "servant, child" (παῖς) in the prayers and referenced as "the Lord" (ὁ κύριος) elsewhere." Jefford argues that this may have been for reasons of cultural sensitivity. Specifically towards Jews, as their beliefs on deity (found in the Torah at Deuteronomy 6:4) stand in opposition to belief in a triune God. This allows for a reading of Didache that harmonises fully with the Jewish perspective on God. This allows the reader to come away unoffended, and thus the text can be correctly read without invocation of a triune God.

Some scholars, however, disagree with Jefford's conclusion on cultural sensitivity. They argue that such caution was impossible to exercise as they believe the trinity doctrine had not yet been developed. For example, the Encyclopedia Britannica says of the trinity "The doctrine developed gradually over several centuries". This position would mean it was impossible for Jefford's conclusion on cultural sensitivity to be correct, since these scholars say "It was not until later in the 4th century that the distinctness of the three and their unity were brought together in a single orthodox doctrine of one essence and three persons." However, other scholars disagree with this conclusion and argued that proto-trinitarian formula and teaching can be found there.

== Second century ==
=== Early second century: Ignatius of Antioch ===
Ignatius, second bishop of Antioch, who was martyred in Rome around 110 AD, wrote a series of letters to churches in Asia Minor on his way to be executed in Rome. The conjunction of Father, Son and Holy Spirit appears in his letter to the Magnesian church:

Study, therefore, to be established in the doctrines of the Lord and the apostles, that so all things, whatsoever ye do, may prosper both in the flesh and spirit; in faith and love; in the Son, and in the Father, and in the Spirit; in the beginning and in the end; with your most admirable bishop, and the well-compacted spiritual crown of your presbytery, and the deacons who are according to God. Be ye subject to the bishop, and to one another, as Jesus Christ to the Father, according to the flesh, and the apostles to Christ, and to the Father, and to the Spirit; that so there may be a union both fleshly and spiritual.

— Epistle to the Magnesians, Chapter 13 [SR]

Unitarians argue that Ignatius is not indicating that the Father, the Son and the Spirit "are one substance anymore than he is saying flesh and spirit are one substance".

=== c. 155: Polycarp of Smyrna ===
Polycarp was martyred in Smyrna (where he was also Bishop) in the year 155. It is said by Irenaeus of Lyons that he was a pupil of the Apostle John. In his final prayer before his martyrdom, he "praises, glorifies, and blesses" the Father. He does this "through" Jesus.

For this cause, yea and for all things, I praise Thee, I bless Thee, I glorify Thee, through the eternal and heavenly High-priest, Jesus Christ, Thy beloved Son, through whom with Him and the Holy Spirit be glory both now [and ever] and for the ages to come. Amen.

— Martyrdom of Polycarp 14:3

=== 169–181: Theophilus of Antioch ===
Theophilus of Antioch's Ad Autolycum is the oldest extant work that uses the actual word "Trinity" to refer to God, his Word and his Wisdom. The context is a discussion of the first three days of creation in Genesis 1–3:

...the three days before the luminaries were created are types of the Trinity, God, his Word, and his Wisdom.

— To Autolycus 2:15

It is maintained by some that "Theophilus does not use τρίας [sic] to mean 'three-in-one', but rather simply uses it to indicate that there were three things before man, God and His Word and His Wisdom"; that he, like other second and third century authors, was referring to "a "trinity", triad or threesome, but not a triune or tripersonal God".

In contrast to Trinitarian theology, Theophilus of Antioch did not view the Son as an eternally self existing person. Theophilus wrote that God "begat Him, emitting Him along with His own wisdom before all things." Instead of speaking of the Word as the Creator, Theophilus speaks of the "Word as a helper in the things that were created by Him", thus he assigns the role of Creator to God alone, while assigning the lesser position of "helper" to the "begat" Son. Many scholars believe this viewpoint is inconsistent with Theophilus believing in a trinity. For example, Dr. Norman Geisler comments: "There are no exceptions; Christ is the Creator of all things including angels and everything visible or invisible. Since Christ could not be both the Creator of everything and at the same time a creature Himself, it is necessary to conclude that He is Himself the uncreated Creator of all creation". It is noteworthy that Theophilus specified that only 1 of the 3 mentioned is God. Even in his most famous quote "Trinity, of God, and His Word, and His wisdom", Theophilus only identifies one of the three as God. The other two are described as being parts or aspects of this God ("His" Word and "His" Wisdom). Neither does Theophilus describe the Word and Wisdom as persons. He simply says "God, then, having His own Word internal within His own bowels, begat Him, emitting Him along with His own wisdom before all things." The viewpoint held by Theophilus of both the Word (whom he later identified as the Son) and God's Wisdom, as both being emitted at some point in time, would seem to conflict with the Trinitarian viewpoint of God being eternal, uncreated, equal and self existing.

== Third century: Theology in response to Patripassianism and Sabellianism ==
In the early 3rd century Tertullian and Hippolytus of Rome wrote Against Praxeas and Against Noetus, respectively, which are sometimes considered the first extant expository treatments of Trinitarian theology. Both authors use the word Trinity (Latin: Trinitas; Greek: Trias), but the term was yet to have its Trinitarian meaning. They wrote these works to combat Patripassianism, the view that the Father suffered on the cross along with the Son. In the 3rd century there were also Trinitarian theologies expressed in writings against Monarchianism, Sabellianism and Modalism.

=== 216: Tertullian ===
Tertullian's treatise against a Patripassian heretic named Praxeas, who claimed that the Father had suffered with the Son on the cross, is arguably the oldest extant treatise with a detailed explicit Trinitarian theology. In his Against Praxeas Tertullian wrote:

And at the same time the mystery of the oikonomia is safeguarded, for the unity is distributed in a Trinity. Placed in order, the three are the Father, Son, and Spirit. They are three, however, not in condition, but in degree; not in being, but in form; not in power, but in kind; of one being, however, and one condition and one power, because he is one God of whom degrees and forms and kinds are taken into account in the name of the Father, and of the Son, and of the Holy Spirit.

— Against Praxeas 2

Others, however, argue that Tertullian was unitarian, claiming that Tertullian's use of the word "trinity" differs from later Trinitarian use: "For Tertullian, the one God is not the Trinity; rather, the one God is a member of the trinity"; "...Tertullian's trinity [was] not a triune God, but rather a triad or group of three, with God as the founding member".

=== c. 220: Hippolytus of Rome ===
In the early 3rd century, Hippolytus of Rome wrote a treatise Against Noetus, in response to a Christian from Smyrna named Noetus who had been promoting Patripassian views, which Hippolytus deemed heretical. Noetus and other Patripassians, such as Praxeas, claimed that the Father as well as the Son had suffered on the cross. Like Tertullian, Hippolytus explicitly used the word Trinity in his treatise against Patripassian views:

The Father's Word, therefore, knowing the economy and the will of the Father, to wit, that the Father seeks to be worshipped in none other way than this, gave this charge to the disciples after he rose from the dead: "Go ye and teach all nations, baptizing them in the name of the Father, and of the Son, and of the Holy Ghost." (Matt 28:19) And by this he showed that whosoever omitted any one of these, failed in glorifying God perfectly. For it is through the Trinity that the Father is glorified. For the Father willed, the Son did and the Spirit manifested.

— Against Noetus

Some, referring to other parts of Against Noetus along with Hippolytus' The Refutation of All Heresies, view Hippolytus as nontrinitarian, saying that "in his theology, the divine (but less divine than God) Logos came to exist from God a finite time ago, so that God could create the cosmos by means of him. On two counts, then, this makes him not a trinitarian – that the "persons" are neither co-equal nor equally divine".

=== c. 225: Origen ===
Origen's On First Principles (De Principiis or Peri Archon) is the oldest extant Christian theological treatise. Origen's theology of the godhead is developed in this treatise, which reveals that by this time the use of the word Trinity to refer to Father, Son and Holy Spirit is standard in orthodox churches. However, it is argued that the word still did not have its later, Trinitarian meaning.

For it is the Trinity alone which exceeds every sense in which not only temporal but even eternal may be understood. It is all other things, indeed, which are outside the Trinity, which are to be measured by time and ages... It seems right to inquire into the reason why he who is 'born again through God' to salvation has need of both Father and Son and Holy Spirit and will not obtain salvation apart from the entire Trinity, and why it is impossible to become partaker of the Father or the Son without the Holy Spirit. In discussing these points it will undoubtedly be necessary to describe the activity which is peculiar to the Holy Spirit and that which is peculiar to the Father and Son.

—

However, it is also argued in contradistinction that the word Trinity is utilized with a very similar meaning to its fourth century use.

This is most clearly pointed out by the Apostle Paul, when demonstrating that the power of the Trinity is one and the same, in the words, "There are diversities of gifts, but the same Spirit; there are diversities of administrations, but the same Lord; and there are diversities of operations, but it is the same God who worketh all in all. But the manifestation of the Spirit is given to every man to profit: withal." From which it most clearly follows that there is no difference in the Trinity, but that which is called the gift of the Spirit is made known through the Son, and operated by God the Father.

Some see Origen as holding what many scholars refer to as a "subordinist" Christology: in Origen, "the Son and Spirit are always in some sense derivative of, less than, and subordinate to their source, the one God, that is, the Father":

The God and Father, who holds the universe together, is superior to every being that exists, for he imparts to each one from his own existence that which each one is; the Son, being less than the Father, is superior to rational creatures alone (for he is second to the Father); the Holy Spirit is still less, and dwells within the saints alone. So that in this way the power of the Father is greater than that of the Son and of the Holy Spirit, and that of the Son is more than that of the Holy Spirit...

— Origen, First, 33-4 [I.3]

From this, it is argued that Origen was in fact unitarian. Others, however, see Origen as teaching the ineffable begetting of the Son and procession of the Spirit as the unity of power and operation. In this view the Son and Spirit have no less power than the Father, by virtue of literally being his power. Both the Nicene and Athanasian Creeds affirm the Son is begotten of, and the Spirit proceeding from, the Father, co-equally and co-eternally.

=== c. 256: Novatian ===
Novatian, presbyter of Rome, wrote the oldest extant Christian treatise that is specifically dedicated to and entitled On the Trinity. It was written in response to a number of views deemed heretical by Novatian, and particularly against Sabellius, who had maintained that the Trinity was divided into three prosopa, or "characters by which God is revealed to man, the Trinity being one of revelation, not essence".

For Scripture as much announces Christ as also God, as it announces God himself as man. It has as much described Jesus Christ to be man, as moreover it has also described Christ the Lord to be God. Because it does not set forth him to be the Son of God only, but also the son of man; nor does it only say, the son of man, but it has also been accustomed to speak of him as the Son of God. So that being of both, he is both, lest if he should be one only, he could not be the other. For as nature itself has prescribed that he must be believed to be a man who is of man, so the same nature prescribes also that he must be believed to be God who is of God…. Let them, therefore, who read that Jesus Christ the son of man is man, read also that this same Jesus is called also God and the Son of God.

— Treatise on the Trinity, 11

Some, referring to chapter 31 of On the Trinity, maintain that when Novatian referred to Christ as 'God' he was still excluding him from being 'the one true God'.

=== 262: Pope Dionysius ===
According to Athanasius of Alexandria, in the mid-3rd century Pope Dionysius wrote a letter to Dionysius of Alexandria criticizing Sabellius's views on the relations between the Son and the Father, as well as some who attempted to refute Sabellius's views. He quotes parts of Dionysius' letter in On the decrees of the Council of Nicaea . In this letter it is clear that Dionysius used the word Trinity (Greek Trias) to explicate the relations between Father, Son and Holy Spirit:

Next, I may reasonably turn to those who divide and cut to pieces and destroy that most sacred doctrine of the Church of God, the Divine Monarchy, making it as it were three powers and partive subsistences and godheads. I am told that some among you who are catechists and teachers of the Divine Word, take the lead in this tenet, who are diametrically opposed, so to speak, to Sabellius' opininons; for he blasphemously says that the Son is the Father, and Father the Son, but they in some sort preach three Gods, as dividing the sacred Unity into three subsistences foreign to each other and utterly separate. For it must be that with the God of the Universe, the Divine Word is united, and the Holy Ghost must repose and habitate in God; thus in one as in a summit, I mean the God of the Universe, must the Divine Trinity be gathered up and brought together [...] Neither, then, may we divide into three godheads the wonderful and divine Unity [...] Rather, we must believe in God, the Father Almighty; and in Christ Jesus, his Son; and in the Holy Spirit; and that the Word is united to the God of the universe. 'For,' he says, 'The Father and I are one,' and 'I am in the Father, and the Father in me'. For thus both the Divine Trinity and the holy preaching of the Monarchy will be preserved.

— De decretis Nic. syn. 26

=== 265: Gregory the Wonderworker ===
Gregory was Bishop of Neocaesarea in Asia Minor, and wrote a Declaration of Faith which treats the Trinity as standard theological vocabulary:

There is one God [...] There is a perfect Trinity, in glory and eternity and sovereignty, neither divided nor estranged. Wherefore there is nothing either created or in servitude in the Trinity; nor anything super-induced, as if at some former period it was non-existent, and at some later period it was introduced. And thus neither was the Son ever wanting to the Father, nor the Spirit to the Son; but without variation and without change, the same Trinity abides ever.

— Declaration of Faith.
