= Patripassianism =

Christian theological position

In Christian theology, patripassianism (as it is referred to in the Western church) is a version of Sabellianism in the Eastern church and a form of modalism (modalistic monarchianism or modal monarchism). Modalism is the belief that God the Father, Jesus, and the Holy Spirit are three modes or emanations of one monadic God, as perceived by the believer, rather than three distinct persons within the Godhead; it holds that there are no real or substantial differences among the three, so the identity of the Spirit or the Son is that of the Father.

In the West, this belief was pejoratively called patripassianism by its critics (from Latin patri-, "father", and passio, "suffering") because they alleged that the teaching required that, since God the Father had become directly incarnate in Jesus, the Father literally sacrificed himself on the cross.

== Trinitarian perspective ==
From the standpoint of the doctrine of the Trinity, with one divine being existing in three persons, patripassianism is considered heretical by some Christian churches because it "simply cannot make sense of the New Testament's teaching on the interpersonal relationship of Father, Son, and Spirit." Patripassianism asserts that God the Father—rather than God the Son—became incarnate and suffered on the cross for humanity's redemption. This amplifies the personhood of Jesus as the personality of the Father, but trinitarians see it as distorting the spiritual transaction of atonement that took place at the cross, which the Apostle Paul described in 2 Corinthians 5:19:

God [the Trinity] was reconciling the world to himself in Christ [the Son], not counting people's sins against them. [...] God [the Trinity] made him who had no sin [Jesus of Nazareth] to be sin for us, so that in him [the Son] we might become the righteousness of God [the Trinity].

It is possible, however, to modify patripassianism to acknowledge God as having feelings toward and sharing in the experiences of both Jesus, whom trinitarian Christians regard as both human and divine, and other human beings. Full-orbed patripassianism denies trinitarian distinctions, yet it does not contradict Christianity as defined in the Nicene Creed to say that God feels or experiences things, including nonphysical forms of suffering. Regarding the crucifixion of Jesus, patripassians claim it is consistent with Scripture to say that God the Father suffered—that is, felt emotional and spiritual pain—as he watched his Son (Jesus) suffer on the cross:

The Spirit searches all things, even the deep things of God [...] no one knows the thoughts of God except the Spirit of God [...] What we have received is [...] the Spirit who is from God.

== History ==
Patripassianism is attested as early as the 2nd century; theologians such as Praxeas speak of God as unipersonal. Patripassianism was referred to as a belief ascribed to those following Sabellianism, after a chief proponent, Sabellius, especially by the chief opponent Tertullian, who also opposed Praxeas. Sabellius, considered a founder of an early movement, was a priest who was excommunicated from one version of the Church by Pope Callixtus I in 220 and lived in Rome. Sabellius advanced the doctrine of one God, sometimes referred to as the "economic Trinity," and he opposed the orthodox doctrine of the "essential Trinity". Praxeas and Noetus were some major followers.

Because the writings of Sabellius were destroyed, it is difficult to know whether he actually believed in patripassianism. One early version of the Apostles' Creed, recorded by Rufinus, explicitly states that the Father is "impassible." This reading dates to about 390 AD. The addition was made in response to patripassianism, which Rufinus evidently regarded as a heresy, and Ignatius believed the incarnate one is the impassible: "being impassible, He was in a passible body; being immortal, He was in a mortal body".

Cyprian and Tertullian famously accused the Modalistic Monarchians of patripassianism. The Monarchians taught the unity of the Godhead in Christ and that, as the Son suffered, the Father also experienced the sufferings. They did not teach that the Father died on the cross, though they were sometimes accused of that.

The term has been used by others, such as F. L. Cross and E. A. Livingstone, to describe other Oneness religions.

== See also ==
- Nontrinitarianism
- Trinitarianism
