= Sabellianism =

Christian theological position

In Christian theology, Sabellianism is the belief that there is only one Person ('hypostasis' in the Greek language of the fourth century Arian Controversy) in the Godhead. For example, Hanson defines Sabellianism as the "refusal to acknowledge the distinct existence of the Persons" and "Eustathius was condemned for Sabellianism. His insistence that there is only one distinct reality (hypostasis) in the Godhead, and his confusion about distinguishing Father, Son and Holy Spirit laid him open to such a charge." Condemned as heresy, Sabellianism has been rejected by the majority of Christian churches.

== Monarchianism ==
Sabellianism appeared for the first time in the second century in the form of Monarchianism. While "this movement called themselves 'Monarchians', the Greek Fathers called them 'Sabellians', as Sabellius was the person who has put this doctrine in its philosophical form."

Monarchianism opposed the Logos-theology. As from the late second century, non-Jewish Christianity was dominated by Logos-theology which taught a two-stage existence for the Logos: He always existed inside God but became a separate Being – a distinct Reality – when God decided to create. Monarchians claimed "that the theology of the Apologists involves a division in the being and unity of God that is unacceptable" and that Logos-theology teaches two creators and two Gods (bi-theism), "inconsistent with monotheism."

In Monarchianism, "the Father and Son were different expressions of the same being, without any personal distinctions between them. In other words, the Father is himself the Son, and therefore experiences the Son's human frailties. ... In the words of Noetus: ... the Father ... Himself became His own Son. ... It was therefore God who was born from a virgin and who confessed himself to humankind as the Son of God. At the cross, God commended his spirit to himself, as he acted to be dead, but he was not dead in reality, although he raised himself on the 3rd day."

Tertullian was one of the Logos theologians and strongly opposed Monarchianism. "The treatise Against Praxeas is widely recognized as Tertullian's greatest work on the Trinity. The view apparently taught by Praxeas has come to be called 'modalism', thanks to that designation appearing in Adolf von Harnack's History of Dogma (1897). Tertullian simply calls his opponent a 'monarchian'."

"Adolph Von Harnack coined the term 'Modalism' for this 2nd-century doctrine, which referred to the Trinity as consisting of 'three modes or aspects of one divine existence'."

Following Tertullian, "The Latin Fathers ... called them 'patripassians' because they have identified the Father and the Son to such an extent that they believed that it was the Father who suffered and died on the cross."

== Sabellius ==
Sabellianism is named after Sabellius (fl. c. 215), who taught a form of it in Rome in the 3rd century. None of his writings have survived, and all that is known about him comes from his opponents.

Monarchianism had come to Sabellius via the teachings of Noetus and Praxeas. Noetus was excommunicated from the Church after being examined by council, and Praxeas is said to have recanted his modalistic views in writing, teaching again his former faith. Sabellius likewise was excommunicated by council in Alexandria, and after complaint of this was made to Rome, a second council then assembled in Rome and also ruled against Sabellianism.

Johann Lorenz von Mosheim, German Lutheran theologian who founded the pragmatic school of church historians, argued that Sabellius described God as three in one sense but one in another. "Sabellius held to the simple unity of the person and nature of God." However, the form of Sabellianism taught by Sabellius is not the same as Monarchianism. He did not believe that the Father, Son, and Holy Spirit are simply three names for the same Reality. He "believed the distinction of Father, Son, and Holy Spirit, described in the Scriptures, to be a real distinction, and not a mere appellative or nominal one." He maintained that, just like a man is one person, but has a body, a soul, and a spirit, so God is one Person, yet in that Person, the Father, the Son, and the Holy Spirit can be discriminated.

“Sabellius, according to the account of Epiphanius, used the comparison of the sun; which is one body, but has three powers, namely, its circular form, its power of illuminating, and its power of heating. This comparison was intended to show, that in the one divine person there are three distinct things, which are not to be confounded.”

“It appears from these comparisons [the sun and the man] that Sabellius did not believe the Father, Son, and Holy Spirit were three names for the same thing... but rather three distinct things which exist together in the one Divine Person.”

“He believed the one divine person whom he recognized, to have three distinct forms, which are really different, and which should not be confounded... Sabellius used the term 'prosopa' which is Greek for 'faces' to describe how the person of God has three faces”

As a result, the Greeks would formally adopt three hypostases language instead of one, to define the distinctions of the persons. The Latins would continue to use the term persona which in Greek was prosopon.

Hippolytus of Rome knew Sabellius personally, writing how he and others had admonished Sabellius in Refutation of All Heresies. He knew Sabellius opposed Trinitarian theology, yet he called Modal Monarchism the heresy of Noetus, not that of Sabellius.

== Jesus Christ ==
In (Modalistic) Monarchianism, Jesus Christ is God. In Dynamic Monarchianism, Jesus Christ is a mere man.

== Homoousios ==
It has been reported that Sabellius used the Greek term homoousian (ὁμοούσιος, 'same substance', 'consubstantial'), which is also used by the Nicene Creed. The term describes the relationship between Father and Son. Many who held with Athanasius were uneasy about the term. Their objection was that it was considered to be un-scriptural, suspicious, and "of a Sabellian tendency." For Sabellius, this term means that the Father and Son were one essential person, operating as different manifestations or modes.

== Other competing views ==
Simonetti sees Arianism "as an extreme reaction against a Sabellianism which was at the time rife in the East." Arianism advocated three hypostases. The Trinitarian view also presents three distinct persons within the Godhead, but while Arianism taught three distinct substances, the Trinity doctrine asserts that the three Persons exist in one substance.

== History and development ==
Sabellianism was embraced by Christians in Cyrenaica, to whom Dionysius, Patriarch of Alexandria (who was instrumental in the excommunication of Sabellius in Alexandria), wrote letters arguing against this belief. Hippolytus wrote:

Some others are secretly introducing another doctrine, who have become disciples of one Noetus, who was a native of Smyrna, (and) lived not very long ago. ... This person introduced a heresy from the tenets of Heraclitus. Now a certain man called Epigonus becomes his minister and pupil, and this person during his sojourn at Rome disseminated his godless opinion. But Cleomenes, who had become his disciple, an alien both in way of life and habits from the Church, was wont to corroborate the (Noetian) doctrine. | But in like manner, also, Noetus, being by birth a native of Smyrna ... introduced (among us) this heresy which originated from one Epigonus. It reached Rome, and was adopted by Cleomenes, and so has continued to this day among his successors.

Tertullian also perceived modalism as entering into the Church from without as a new idea, and opposing the doctrine which had been received through succession. After setting forth his understanding of the manner of faith which had been received by the Church, he then describes how the "simple" who always constitute the majority of believers are often startled at the idea that the One God exists in three and were opposed to his understanding of "the rule of faith." Proponents of Tertullian argue that he described the "simple" as the majority, rather than those who opposed him as the majority. This is contended from Tertullian's argument that they were putting forth ideas of their own which had not been taught to them by their elders:

We, however, as we indeed always have done (and more especially since we have been better instructed by the Paraclete, who leads men indeed into all truth), believe that there is one only God, but under the following dispensation, or οἰκονομία, as it is called, that this one only God has also a Son, His Word, who proceeded from Himself, by whom all things were made, and without whom nothing was made. Him we believe to have been sent by the Father into the Virgin, and to have been born of her—being both Man and God, the Son of Man and the Son of God, and to have been called by the name of Jesus Christ; we believe Him to have suffered, died, and been buried, according to the Scriptures, and, after He had been raised again by the Father and taken back to heaven, to be sitting at the right hand of the Father, and that He will come to judge the quick and the dead; who sent also from heaven from the Father, according to His own promise, the Holy Ghost, the Paraclete, the sanctifier of the faith of those who believe in the Father, and in the Son, and in the Holy Ghost. That this rule of faith has come down to us from the beginning of the gospel, even before any of the older heretics, much more before Praxeas, a pretender of yesterday, will be apparent both from the lateness of date which marks all heresies, and also from the absolutely novel character of our new-fangled Praxeas. In this principle also we must henceforth find a presumption of equal force against all heresies whatsoever—that whatever is first is true, whereas that is spurious which is later in date.

The simple, indeed, (I will not call them unwise and unlearned,) who always constitute the majority of believers, are startled at the dispensation (of the Three in One), on the ground that their very rule of faith withdraws them from the world’s plurality of gods to the one only true God; not understanding that, although He is the one only God, He must yet be believed in with His own οἰκονομία . The numerical order and distribution of the Trinity they assume to be a division of the Unity; whereas the Unity which derives the Trinity out of its own self is so far from being destroyed, that it is actually supported by it. They are constantly throwing out against us that we are preachers of two gods and three gods, while they take to themselves pre-eminently the credit of being worshippers of the One God; just as if the Unity itself with irrational deductions did not produce heresy, and the Trinity rationally considered constitute the truth.

According to modalism and Sabellianism, God is said to be only one person who reveals himself in different ways called modes, faces, aspects, roles or masks (Greek πρόσωπα prosopa; Latin personae) of the One God, as perceived by the believer, rather than three co-eternal persons within the Godhead, or a "co-equal Trinity". Modalists note that the only number expressly and repeatedly ascribed to God in the Old Testament is One, do not accept interpreting this number as denoting union (i.e. Gen 2:24) when it is applied to God, and dispute the meaning or validity of related New Testament passages cited by Trinitarians.

The Comma Johanneum, which is generally regarded as a spurious text in First John (1 John 5:7) known primarily from the King James Version and some versions of the Textus Receptus, but not included in modern critical texts, is an instance (the only one expressly stated) of the word Three describing God. Many modalists point out the lack of the word "Trinity" in any canonical scripture.

Passages such as Deut 6:4-5; Deut 32:12; 2Kings 19:15-19; Job 6:10; Job 31:13-15; Psalm 71:22; Psalm 83:16,18; Is 42:8; Is 45:5-7; Is 48:2,9,11-13; Mal 2:8,10; Matt 19:17; Romans 3:30; 2Cor 11:2-3; Gal 3:20; and Jude 1:25 are referenced by modalists as affirming that the Being of the One God is solidly single, and although known in several modes, precludes any concept of divine co-existence. Hippolytus described similar reasoning by Noetus and his followers saying:

Now they seek to exhibit the foundation for their dogma by citing the word in the law, "I am the God of your fathers: ye shall have no other gods beside me;" and again in another passage, "I am the first," He saith, "and the last; and beside me there is none other." Thus they say they prove that God is one.... And we cannot express ourselves otherwise, he says; for the apostle also acknowledges one God, when he says, "Whose are the fathers, (and) of whom as concerning the flesh Christ came, who is over all, God blessed for ever."

Oneness Pentecostals, an identifier used by some modern modalists, claim that Colossians 1:12-20 refers to Christ's relationship with the Father in the sense of different roles of God:

giving thanks to the Father, who has qualified you to share in the inheritance of the saints in light. He has delivered us from the domain of darkness and transferred us to the kingdom of his beloved Son, in whom we have redemption, the forgiveness of sins. He is the image of the invisible God, the firstborn of all creation. For by him all things were created, in heaven and on earth, visible and invisible, whether thrones or dominions or rulers or authorities; all things were created through him and for him. And he is before all things, and in him all things hold together. And he is the head of the body, the church. He is the beginning, the firstborn from the dead, that in everything he might be preeminent. For in him all the fullness of God was pleased to dwell, and through him to reconcile to himself all things, whether on earth or in heaven, making peace by the blood of his cross.

Oneness Pentecostals also cite Christ's response to Philip's query on who the Father was in John 14:10 to support this assertion:

Jesus answered: "Don't you know me, Philip, even after I have been among you such a long time? Anyone who has seen me has seen the Father. How can you say, 'Show us the Father'?

Trinitarian Christians hold that verses such as Colossians 1:12-20 remove all reasonable doubt that scripture teaches the Son, Who IS the Word of God (i.e. John 1:1-3), is literally "living," and literally Creator of everything together with God the Father and the Spirit of God. In the Trinitarian view, the above usage not only takes John 14:10 out of its immediate context, but is also resolutely contrary to the congruence of the Gospel of John as a whole, and strongly suspected of begging the question in interpretation. Trinitarians understand John 14:10 as informed by parallel verses such as John 1:14 and John 1:18, and as affirming the eternal union of the Son with His Father:

And the Word became flesh, and dwelt among us, and we saw His glory, glory as of the only begotten from the Father, full of grace and truth ... No one has seen God at any time; the only begotten God who is in the bosom of the Father, He has explained Him.

Many doctrinal exchanges between modalists and Trinitarians are similar to the above. Passages such as Gen 1:26-27; Gen 16:11-13; Gen 32:24,30; Judg 6:11-16; Is 48:16; Zech 2:8-9; Matt 3:16-17; Mark 13:32; Luke 12:10; John 5:18-27; John 14:26-28; John 15:26; John 16:13-16; John 17:5,20-24; Acts 1:6-9; and Heb 1:1-3,8-10 are referenced by Trinitarians as affirming that the Being of the One God is an eternal, personal, and mutually indwelling communion of Father [God], Son [the Word of God], and Holy Spirit [the Spirit of God].

Addressing the fact that the word Trinity does not occur in scripture, Trinitarians attest that extra-biblical doctrinal language often summarizes our understanding scripture in a clear and concise manner—other examples being even the words modalism, mode, and role—and that use of such language does not of itself demonstrate accuracy or inaccuracy. The accusative implication that the word Trinity gained common use apart from careful and pious fidelity to scripture may be associated with ad hominem argumentation. Hippolytus described his own response to Noetus' doctrine, claiming the truth to be more evident than either of the two mutually opposed views of Arianism and Sabellianism :

In this way, then, they choose to set forth these things, and they make use only of one class of passages; just in the same one-sided manner that Theodotus employed when he sought to prove that Christ was a mere man. But neither has the one party nor the other understood the matter rightly, as the Scriptures themselves confute their senselessness, and attest the truth. See, brethren, what a rash and audacious dogma they have introduced... For who will not say that there is one God? Yet he will not on that account deny the economy [i.e., the number and disposition of persons in the Trinity]. The proper way, therefore, to deal with the question is first of all to refute the interpretation put upon these passages by these men, and then to explain their real meaning.

Tertullian said of Praxeas' followers:

For, confuted on all sides on the distinction between the Father and the Son, which we maintain without destroying their inseparable union ... they endeavour to interpret this distinction in a way which shall nevertheless tally with their own opinions: so that, all in one Person, they distinguish two, Father and Son, understanding the Son to be flesh, that is man, that is Jesus; and the Father to be spirit, that is God, that is Christ. Thus they, while contending that the Father and the Son are one and the same, do in fact begin by dividing them rather than uniting them.”

A comparison of the above statement by Tertullian with the following example statement made by Oneness Pentecostals today is striking: "Jesus is the Son of God according to the flesh ... and the very God Himself according to the Spirit ..."

The form of the Lord's Name appearing in verse nineteen of the Great Commission, Matthew 28:16-20, has also historically been spoken during Christian baptism, Trinitarian Christians believing the three distinct, albeit co-inherent, persons of the Holy Trinity received witness by Jesus' baptism. Many modalists do not use this form as the Lord's Name. It is also suggested by some modern Oneness Pentecostal critics, that Matthew 28:19 is not part of the original text, because Eusebius of Caesarea quoted it by saying "In my name", and in that source there was no mention of baptism in the verse. Eusebius quoted the "trinitarian" formula in his later writings. (Conybeare (Hibbert Journal i (1902-3), page 102).

Matthew 28:19 is quoted also in the Didache (Didache 7:1), which dates to the late 1st Century or early 2nd Century) and in the Diatesseron (Diatesseron 55:5-7), which dates to the mid 2nd Century harmony of the Synoptic Gospels. The Shem-Tob's Hebrew Gospel of Matthew (George Howard), written during the 14th century, also has no reference of baptism or a "trinitarian" formula in Matthew 28:19.

However, it is also true that no Greek manuscript of the Gospel of Matthew has ever been found which does not contain Matthew 28:19. The earliest extant copies of Matthew's Gospel date to the 3rd Century, and they contain Matthew 28:19. Therefore, scholars generally agree that Matthew 28:19 is likely part of the original Gospel of Matthew, though a minority disputes this.

In passages of scripture such as Matthew 3:16-17 where the Father, Son, and Holy Spirit are separated in the text and witness, modalists view this phenomenon as confirming God's omnipresence, and His ability to manifest himself as he pleases. Oneness Pentecostals and Modalists attempt to dispute the traditional doctrine of eternal co-existent union, while affirming the Christian doctrine of God taking on flesh as Jesus Christ. Like Trinitarians, Oneness adherents attest that Jesus Christ is fully God and fully man. However, Trinitarians believe that the "Word of God," the eternal second Person of the Trinity, was manifest as the Son of God by taking humanity to Himself and by glorifying that Humanity to equality with God through His resurrection, in eternal union with His own Divinity.

In contrast, Oneness adherents hold that the One and Only true God—Who manifests Himself in any way He chooses, including as Father, Son and Holy Spirit (though not choosing to do so in an eternally simultaneous manner)—became man in the temporary role of Son. Many Oneness Pentecostals have also placed a strongly Nestorian distinction between Jesus' humanity and Divinity as in the example compared with Tertullian's statement above.

Oneness Pentecostals and other modalists are regarded by Roman Catholic, Greek Orthodox, and most other mainstream Christians as heretical for denying the literal existence of God's Beloved Son from Heaven, including His eternal Being; rejecting the direct succession of apostolic gifts and authority through the ordination of the Christian bishops; rejecting the identity of mainstream Christians as the God-begotten Body and Church which Christ founded; and rejecting the affirmations of the ecumenical councils such as the Councils of Nicaea and Constantinople, including the Holy Trinity.

While many Unitarians are Arians, modalists differentiate themselves from Arian or Semi-Arian Unitarians by affirming Christ's full Godhead, whereas both the Arian and Semi-Arian views assert Christ as not of one substance (Greek: οὐσία) with, and therefore also not equal with, God the Father. Dionysius, bishop of Rome, set forth the understanding of traditional Christianity concerning both Arianism and Sabellianism in Against the Sabellians, ca. AD 262. He, in similarity to Hippolytus, explained that the two errors are at opposite extremes in seeking to understand the Son of God, Arianism misusing that the Son is distinct respecting the Father, and Sabellianism misusing that the Son is equal respecting the Father. He also repudiated the idea of three Gods as error.

While Arianism and Sabellianism may appear to be diametrically opposed, the former claiming Christ to be created and the latter claiming Christ is God, both in common deny the Trinitarian belief that Christ is God Eternal in His Humanity, and that this is the very basis of man's hope of salvation. "One, not by conversion of the Godhead into flesh, but by taking of the manhood into God."

Hippolytus' account of the excommunication of Noetus is as follows:

When the blessed presbyters heard this, they summoned him before the Church, and examined him. But he denied at first that he held such opinions. Afterwards, however, taking shelter among some, and having gathered round him some others who had embraced the same error, he wished thereafter to uphold his dogma openly as correct. And the blessed presbyters called him again before them, and examined him. But he stood out against them, saying, "What evil, then, am I doing in glorifying Christ?" And the presbyters replied to him, "We too know in truth one God; we know Christ; we know that the Son suffered even as He suffered, and died even as He died, and rose again on the third day, and is at the right hand of the Father, and cometh to judge the living and the dead. And these things which we have learned we allege." Then, after examining him, they expelled him from the Church. And he was carried to such a pitch of pride, that he established a school.

Today's Oneness Pentecostal organisations left their original organization when a council of Pentecostal leaders officially adopted Trinitarianism, and have since established schools.

Epiphanius (Haeres 62) about 375 notes that the adherents of Sabellius were still to be found in great numbers, both in Mesopotamia and at Rome. The First Council of Constantinople in 381 in canon VII and the Third Council of Constantinople in 680 in canon XCV declared the baptism of Sabellius to be invalid, which indicates that Sabellianism was still extant.

== Patripassianism ==
The chief critics of Sabellianism were Tertullian and Hippolytus. In his work Adversus Praxeas, Chapter I, Tertullian wrote "By this Praxeas did a twofold service for the devil at Rome: he drove away prophecy, and he brought in heresy; he put to flight the Paraclete, and he crucified the Father." Likewise Hippolytus wrote,

Do you see, he says, how the Scriptures proclaim one God? And as this is clearly exhibited, and these passages are testimonies to it, I am under necessity, he says, since one is acknowledged, to make this One the subject of suffering. For Christ was God, and suffered on account of us, being Himself the Father, that He might be able also to save us.... See, brethren, what a rash and audacious dogma they have introduced, when they say without shame, the Father is Himself Christ, Himself the Son, Himself was born, Himself suffered, Himself raised Himself. But it is not so.

From these notions came the pejorative term "Patripassianism" for the movement, from the Latin words pater for "father", and passus from the verb "to suffer" because it implied that the Father suffered on the Cross.

The only sources extant for understanding Sabellianism are from their detractors. Scholars today are not in agreement as to what exactly Sabellius or Praxeas taught. It is easy to suppose that Tertullian and Hippolytus at least at times misrepresented the opinions of their opponents.

== Eastern Orthodox view ==
The Greek Orthodox teach that God is not of a substance that is comprehensible since God the Father has no origin and is eternal and infinite. Thus it is improper to speak of things as "physical" and "metaphysical"; rather it is correct to speak of things as "created" and "uncreated." God the Father is the origin and source of the Trinity of Whom the Son is begotten and the Spirit proceeding, all Three being Uncreated.

Therefore, the consciousness of God is not obtainable to created beings either in this life or the next (see apophatism). Through co-operation with the Holy Spirit (called theosis), Mankind can become good (God-like), not becoming uncreated, but partaker of His divine energies (2 Peter 1:4). From such a perspective Mankind can be reconciled from the Knowledge of Good and the Knowledge of Evil he obtained in the Garden of Eden (see the Fall of Man), his created substance thus partaking of Uncreated God through the indwelling Presence of the eternally incarnate (Phil 3:21) Son of God and His Father by the Spirit (John 17:22–24, Rom 8:11,16-17).

== Current adherents ==
At the Arroyo Seco World Wide Camp Meeting, near Los Angeles, in 1913, Canadian evangelist R.E. McAlister stated at a baptismal service that the apostles had baptized in the name of Jesus only and not in the triune Name of Father, Son, and Holy Spirit. Later that night, John G. Schaeppe, a German immigrant, had a vision of Jesus and woke up the camp shouting that the name of Jesus needed to be glorified. From that point, Frank J. Ewart began requiring that anyone baptized using the Trinitarian formula needed to be rebaptized in the name of Jesus "only". Support for this position began to spread, along with a belief in one Person in the Godhead, acting in different modes or offices.

The General Council of the Assemblies of God convened in St. Louis, Missouri in October 1916, to confirm their belief in Trinitarian orthodoxy. The Oneness camp was faced by a majority who required acceptance of the Trinitarian baptismal formula and the orthodox doctrine of the Trinity or remove themselves from the denomination. In the end, about a quarter of the ministers withdrew.

Oneness Pentecostalism teaches that God is one Person, and that the Father (a spirit) is united with Jesus (a man) as the Son of God. However, Oneness Pentecostalism differs somewhat by rejecting sequential modalism, and by the full acceptance of the begotten humanity of the Son, not eternally begotten, who was the man Jesus and was born, crucified, and risen, and not the deity. This directly opposes the pre-existence of the Son as a pre-existent mode, which Sabellianism generally does not oppose.

Oneness Pentecostals believe that Jesus was "Son" only when he became flesh on earth, but was the Father before being made man. They refer to the Father as the "Spirit" and the Son as the "Flesh", but they believe that Jesus and the Father are one essential Person, though operating as different "manifestations" or "modes". Oneness Pentecostals reject the Trinity doctrine, viewing it as pagan and nonscriptural, and hold to the Jesus' Name doctrine with respect to baptisms. They are often referred to as "Modalists" or "Jesus Only". Oneness Pentecostalism can be compared to Sabellianism, or can be described as holding to a form of Sabellianism, as both are nontrinitarian, and as both believe that Jesus Christ was "Almighty God in the Flesh", as being the same essential person as the Father, and not a distinct person from Him, although being a distinct mode or manifestation, but Oneness Pentecostalism and original Sabellianism do not totally identify each other.

It cannot be certain whether Sabellius taught Modalism completely as it is taught today as Oneness doctrine, since only a few fragments of his writings are extant and, therefore, all we have of his teachings comes through the writing of his detractors.

The following excerpts which demonstrate some of the known doctrinal characteristics of ancient Sabellians may be seen to compare with the doctrines in the modern Oneness movement:

- Cyprian wrote: "...how, when God the Father is not known, nay, is even blasphemed, can they who among the heretics are said to be baptized in the name of Christ, be judged to have obtained the remission of sins?"
- Hippolytus (A.D. 170–236) referred to them: "And some of these assent to the heresy of the Noetians, and affirm that the Father himself is the Son..."
- Pope Dionysius, Bishop of Rome from A.D. 259–69 wrote: "Sabellius... blasphemes in saying that the Son Himself is the Father and vice versa."
- Tertullian states: "He commands them to baptize into the Father and the Son and the Holy Ghost, not into a unipersonal God. And indeed it is not once only, but three times, that we are immersed into three persons, at each several mention of their names."

== Current opposition ==
While Oneness Pentecostals seek to differentiate themselves from ancient Sabellianism, modern theologians such as James R. White and Robert Morey see no significant difference between the ancient heresy of Sabellianism and current Oneness doctrine. This is based on the denial by Oneness Pentecostals of the Trinity, believing that there is no distinction between the Father, Son, and Holy Spirit. Sabellianism, Patripassianism, Modalistic Monarchianism, functionalism, Jesus Only, Father Only, and Oneness Pentecostalism are viewed by these theologians as being derived from a Platonic doctrine that God was an indivisible Monad and could not be differentiated as distinct Persons.

== See also ==
- Adoptionism
- Arianism
- Greek Gospel of the Egyptians
- Monarchianism
