= Calepodius =

Christian saint

Saint Calepodius

Martyr
- Died: 232 AD
- Venerated in: Roman Catholic Church
- Canonized: Pre-congregation
- Major shrine: Santa Maria in Trastevere, Rome, Italy
- Feast: May 10

Calepodius was the name of a 4th-century bishop of Naples.

Saint Calepodius (Italian: San Calepodio; died 232 AD) was a priest who was killed during the persecutions of Christians by the Roman Emperor Alexander Severus. One of the catacombs of Rome, the cemetery of Calepodius on the Aurelian Way, was named after him.

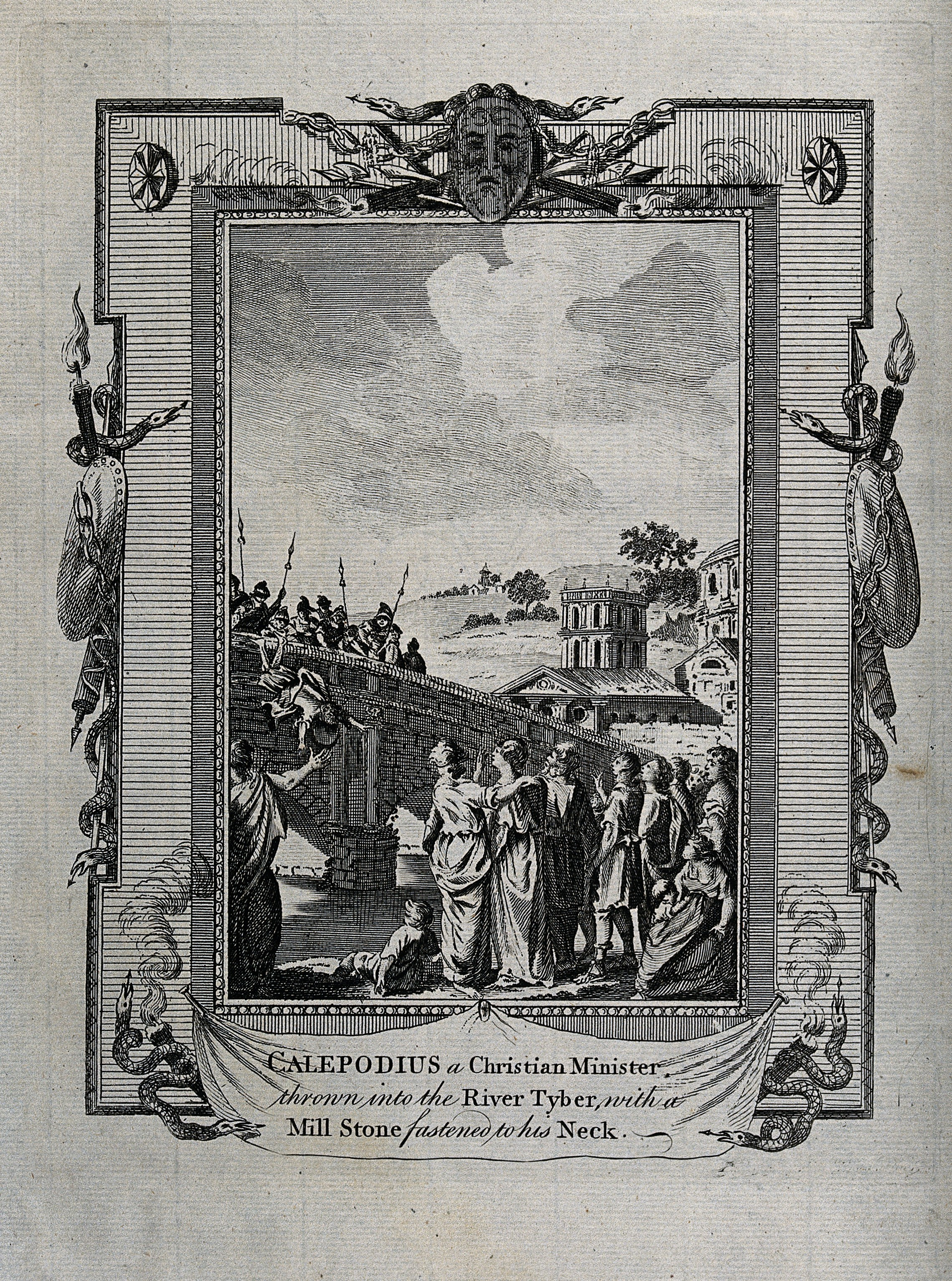
Martyrdom of Calepodius

His Hagiography recalls that he was tortured and then thrown into the Tiber river with a mill stone tied round his neck.

== Veneration ==
His relics, along with those of Saint Callistus and Saint Cornelius, were translated in the 10th century to the Church of Santa Maria in Trastevere (St. Mary beyond the Tiber) and deposited under the high altar. Some relics of the three saints were translated to Fulda and Cysoing, and some of Callistus’ relics were also translated to Notre-Dame de Reims. However, some of Callistus’ relics are still kept with those of Calepodius in Santa Maria in Trastevere.

Saint Calepodius is venerated on May 10 with saints Palmatius, Simplicius, Felix, Blanda, and companions. St. Palmatius was of consular rank, and he died with his wife, children, and household. St. Simplicius was a senator who suffered death with sixty-five members of his family and household. Sts. Felix and Blanda were husband and wife.
