= Pope Zephyrinus =

Head of the Catholic Church from 199 to 217

Pope Saint Zephyrinus
- Bishop of Rome
- Fresco originally located in the Basilica of Saint Paul Outside the Walls, c. 450
- Church: Catholic Church
- Papacy began: 199
- Papacy ended: 20 December 217
- Predecessor: Victor I
- Successor: Callixtus I

Personal details
- Born: Rome, Italy, Roman Empire
- Died: 20 December 217 Rome, Italy, Roman Empire

Sainthood
- Feast day: 20 December (Maronite Church, Orthodox Churches, Latin Church); 26 August (Latin Church pre-1969)

Pope Zephyrinus was the bishop of Rome from the year 199 until his death on 20 December 217. He was born in Rome, and succeeded Victor I. Upon his death on 20 December 217, he was succeeded by his principal advisor, Callixtus I. He is known for combating heresies and defending the divinity of Christ.

== Papacy ==
During the 18-year pontificate of Zephyrinus, the young Church endured persecution under the Emperor Septimius Severus until his death in the year 211. To quote Alban Butler, "this holy pastor was the support and comfort of the distressed flock". According to St. Optatus, Zephyrinus also combated new heresies and apostasies, chief of which were Marcion, Praxeas, Valentinus and the Montanists. Eusebius insists that Zephyrinus fought vigorously against the blasphemies of the two Theodotuses, who in response treated him with contempt, but later called him the greatest defender of the divinity of Christ. Although he was not physically martyred for the faith, his suffering – both mental and spiritual – during his pontificate have earned him the title of martyr, a title that was repealed 132 years after his death. He was accused of being seduced by Monarchian views.

=== Conflicts ===
During the reign of Emperor Septimius Severus (193–211), relations with the young Christian Church deteriorated, and in 202 or 203, the edict of persecution appeared, which forbade conversion to Christianity under the severest penalties.

Zephyrinus's predecessor, Pope Victor I, had excommunicated Theodotus the Tanner for reviving a heresy that Christ became God only after the Resurrection. Theodotus' followers formed a separate heretical community at Rome, ruled by another Theodotus, the Money Changer, and Asclepiodotus. Natalius, who was tortured for his faith during the persecution, was persuaded by Asclepiodotus to become a bishop in their sect in exchange for a monthly stipend of 150 denarii. Natalius then reportedly experienced several visions warning him to abandon these heretics. According to an anonymous work entitled The Little Labyrinth quoted by Eusebius, Natalius was whipped a whole night by an angel, and the next day, he donned sackcloth and ashes and weeping bitterly threw himself at the feet of Zephyrinus.

=== Feast day ===
A feast of St Zephyrinus, Pope and Martyr, held on 26 August, was inserted in the General Roman Calendar in the 13th century, but was removed in the 1969 revision, since he was not a martyr and 26 August is not the anniversary of his death, which is 20 December, the day under which he is now mentioned in the Roman Martyrology. His feast is also currently celebrated on 20 December in the Maronite Church and in Orthodox Churches. Where the preconciliar rites of the Latin Church are used, his feast continues to be celebrated on 26 August and under the title "Pope and Martyr."

== See also ==
- List of Catholic saints
- List of popes

== Notes ==
Titles of the Great Christian Church
Preceded by Victor I	Bishop of Rome; 199–217	Succeeded by Callixtus I
