= Modalistic Monarchianism =

Christian theological position

Modalistic Monarchianism, also known as Modalism or Oneness Christology, is a Christian theology upholding the unipersonal oneness of God while also affirming the divinity of Jesus. As a form of Monarchianism, it stands in contrast to Adoptionism (Dynamic Monarchianism), a Christology of the divine nature of Jesus that views Jesus as not pre-existent as a distinct divine person, although empowered by God the Father through the Holy Spirit. Dynamic Monarchianism is closely associated with Adoptionism, a theology of the Godhead that argues that Jesus became God's son at a moment in time when God adopted or exalted him into divinity. The term modalism was first used by Trinitarian scholar Adolf von Harnack, referencing this belief.

Modalistic Monarchianism is opposed to Trinitarianism and binitarianism. Followers of Modalistic Monarchianism consider themselves to be monotheistic in a strict sense—similar to Jews and Muslims—and they argue for no plurality of persons in the theology of God. They consider God's person to be absolutely one and assert that the person of God reveals himself to creation through different "modes" (or "manifestations")—namely, the Father, Son, and the Holy Ghost—without limiting his modes or manifestations.

In this view, the godhead is understood to have dwelt in Jesus from the incarnation as a manifestation of the God of the Old Testament (Hebrew Bible). The terms "Father" and "Son" are then used to describe the distinction between the transcendence of God and the incarnation. To frame it another way, "Father" and "Son" are technical terms that distinguish between the deity of God alone (i.e., the Father) and the deity of God joined to the human nature in Jesus (i.e., the Son). Lastly, since God is a spirit, it is held that the Holy Spirit should not be understood as a distinct person but rather as the one God, acting in the world.

Modalistic Monarchianism is closely related to Sabellianism and Patripassianism, two ancient theologies condemned as heresy in the Great Church and successive state church of the Roman Empire.

== History ==
Theologian and church historian Adolf von Harnack first used the term modalism to describe a doctrine that was believed in the late 2nd and 3rd centuries CE. At the time, Christian theologians were attempting to clarify the relationship between God the Father, the Son, and the Holy Spirit. Concerned with defending the absolute unity of God, modalists such as Noetus, Praxeas, and Sabellius explained the divinity of Jesus and the Holy Spirit as the one God revealing himself in different ways or modes:

1. God revealed as the creator and lawgiver is called "the Father";
2. God revealed as the savior in Jesus is called "the Son";
3. God revealed as the one who sanctifies and grants eternal life is called "the Spirit".

By the 4th century, a consensus had developed in favor of Trinitarianism, and modalism was generally considered heresy.

With the advent of Pentecostalism, the revived theology developed into a central tenet of Oneness Pentecostalism. Oneness Pentecostals teach the divinity of Jesus and understand him to be a manifestation of Yahweh, the God of the Old Testament, in the flesh, and the Holy Spirit, or God in action. They also conduct baptism in the name of Jesus alone; in this way, Father, Son, and Holy Spirit are considered titles pertaining to the one God, not descriptions of distinct individuals, and Jesus is seen as the one name for these titles.

== Current adherents ==
Modalistic Monarchianism is accepted within Oneness Pentecostalism. Much of the movement's theology is grounded in a Christian exegesis of the Hebrew Biblical God in order to understand what the first apostles would have believed about Jesus. It also seeks to avoid use of theological categories produced by Platonic-Aristotelian epistemologies, preferring rather to tell the story of redemption through narrative. Thus, the distinction found in the New Testament writers between God the Father and Jesus is understood to be from the attempts to identify God the Father and Jesus together, rather than to separate them more than necessary.

== See also ==
- Names of God in Christianity
- Nontrinitarianism
