= Pope Calixtus =

Pope Calixtus can refer to three different popes:

- Pope Callixtus I, pope from about 217 to about 222
- Pope Callixtus II, pope from 1119 to 1124
- Pope Callixtus III, pope from 1455 to 1458
