= Monarchianism =

Christian theological doctrine

Monarchianism is a Christian doctrine that emphasizes God as one indivisible being, in direct contrast to Trinitarianism, which defines the Godhead as three co-eternal, consubstantial, co-immanent, and equally divine hypostases.

== History ==
During the patristic period, Christian theologians attempted to clarify the relationship between the Father, Son and Holy Spirit. Monarchianism developed in the 2nd century and persisted further into the 3rd century. Monarchianism (from the Greek monarkhia, meaning "ruling of one," and -ismos, meaning "practice or teaching") stresses the absolute, uncompromising unity of God.

Monarchians were opposed by Logos theologians (Tertullian, Hippolytus, Clement of Alexandria, and Origen of Alexandria). The Trinitarian view gained prominence and was adopted at the First Council of Constantinople in 381. Monarchianism was considered a heresy after the 4th century.

== Types ==
Two types of monarchianism were propounded:

=== Adoptionism ===
Adoptionism (or dynamic monarchianism or Dynamism) holds that God is one being, above all else, wholly indivisible, and of one nature. It holds that the Son was not co-eternal with the Father and that Jesus Christ was essentially granted godhood (adopted) for the plans of God and for his own perfect life and works. Different variations of Dynamism hold that Jesus was "adopted" either at the time of his baptism or his ascension.

Notable adherents included Artemon, Beryllus of Bostra, a third-century bishop who debated with Origen, Paul of Samosata, a bishop of Antioch, and Theodotus of Byzantium.

=== Modalism ===
Modalistic monarchianism (or Modalism) considers God to be one, who appears and works through the different "modes" of Father, Son, and Holy Spirit. Following this view, all of the Godhead is understood to dwell in the person of Jesus from the incarnation. The terms "Father" and "Son" are then used to describe the distinction between the transcendence of God and the incarnation. Lastly, since God is understood as a Spirit in the context of the Gospel of John, it is held that the Holy Spirit should not be understood as a separate entity but rather as a mere descriptor of God's action.

Notable adherents included Noetus, Praxeas, and Sabellius, hence why the view is commonly called Sabellianism. Nevertheless, Sabellius's writings did not survive and so the little that is known about his beliefs is from secondary sources.

The name "Monarchian" properly does not strictly apply to the Adoptionists, or Dynamists, as they (the latter) "did not start from the monarchy of God, and their doctrine is strictly Christological".

== See also ==
- Arianism
- Monarchian Prologue
- Monism
- Nicene Christianity
- Nontrinitarianism
- Oneness Pentecostalism
- Subordinationism
- Unitarianism
