= Catacomb of Calepodius =

Ancient Roman site

Coordinates: 41°53′33″N 12°25′57″E

The Catacomb of Calepodius (also called the Cemetery of Calepodius) is one of the Catacombs of Rome, notable for containing the tombs of Pope Callixtus I (ironically, the creator of the Catacomb of Callixtus, which once contained the tombs of a dozen other popes) and Pope Julius I, along with the eponymous Calepodius.

== Prominent interments ==
Callixtus I (217–222) was interred in the Catacomb of Calepodius, instead of that which bears his name, allegedly because the latter was under surveillance of the emperor's guards; this legend as well as that of Callixtus I's martyrdom is unlikely as there was no persecution of Christians under Alexander Severus, the emperor when Callixtus I died. However, Julius I erected a more elaborate tomb of Callixtus I in the catacomb in the fourth century, decorated with frescos of his alleged martyrdom. This tomb was discovered in 1960, although the relics were likely translated to Santa Maria in Trastevere in 790 by Pope Adrian I due to the impending Lombard invasion.

The only other papal tomb in the Catacomb of Calepodius was that of Pope Julius I (337–352), who was translated with Callixtus I to Santa Maria in Trastevere. Calepodius, the early Christian martyr eponymous with the Catacomb was translated with the two pontiffs.

== See also ==
- List of ancient monuments in Rome
