= Consubstantiality =

Christian theology of the Trinity

Consubstantiality, a term derived from Latin: consubstantialitas, denotes identity of substance or essence in spite of difference in aspect.

It appears most commonly in its adjectival form, "consubstantial", from Latin consubstantialis, and its best-known use is in regard to an account, in Christian theology, of the relation between Jesus Christ and God the Father.

== Theological use ==
The affirmation that Jesus Christ is "consubstantial with the Father" appears in the Nicene Creed. Greek was the language in which the Nicene Creed was originally enunciated. The word used was Greek: ὁμοούσιος (homoousios) and means "of the same substance." This may be contrasted with the term ὁμοιούσιος (homoiousios), meaning "of like substance" and, therefore, not the "same substance," as was proposed, for example, at a later church council (the Council of Seleucia regarding the Arian controversy) in the year 359.

The term οὐσία (ousia) is an Ancient Greek noun, formed on the feminine present participle of the verb εἰμί, eimí, meaning "to be, I am", so similar grammatically to the English noun "being". There was no equivalent grammatical formation in Latin, and it was translated as essentia or substantia and then indirectly into English as "essence" or "substance". Cicero coined essentia and the philosopher Seneca and rhetorician Quintilian used it as equivalent for οὐσία, while Apuleius rendered οὐσία both as essentia or substantia. In order to designate οὐσία, early Christian theologian Tertullian favored the use of substantia over essentia, while Augustine of Hippo and Boethius took the opposite stance, preferring the use of essentia as designation for οὐσία.

The word "consubstantial" was used by the Council of Chalcedon (451) to declare that Christ is "consubstantial with the Father in respect of the Godhead, and the same consubstantial with us in respect of the manhood".

In contemporary Christian theology, the Holy Spirit is also described as consubstantial with the Father and Son.

== Alternative translations of the Nicene-Creed term ==
In the 1662 Book of Common Prayer of the Church of England, the adjective "consubstantial" in the Nicene Creed is rendered by the phrase "being of one substance". The same phrase appeared already in the Book of Common Prayer (1549) and continues to be used, within "Order Two", in Common Worship, which within "Order One" gives the ecumenical English Language Liturgical Consultation version, "of one Being".

The Eastern Orthodox Church use "of one essence".

The Catholic Church, in its official translation of the Nicene Creed, uses the term "consubstantial" as a translation of "consubstantialem" (in Greek “ὁμοούσιον"), instead of "of one Being with the Father" (or, in the United States only, "one in Being with the Father"), which were the English translations used until November 2011.

== In rhetoric ==
In rhetoric, "consubstantiality", as defined by Kenneth Burke, is "a practice-related concept based on stylistic identifications and symbolic structures, which persuade and produce acceptance: an acting-together within, and defined by, a common context". To be consubstantial with something is to be identified with it, to be associated with it; yet at the same time, to be different from what it is identified with. It can be seen as an extension or in relation to the subject.

Burke explains this concept with two entities, A and B. He goes on to explain that "A is not identical with his colleague, B. But insofar as their interests are joined, A is identified with B. Or he may identify himself with B even when their interests are not joined, if he assumes they are, or is persuaded to believe so...In being identified with B, A is 'substantially one' with a person other than himself. Yet at the same time, he remains unique, an individual locus of motives. Thus he is both joined and separate, at once a distinct substance and consubstantial with another."

"Consubstantiality may be necessary for any way of life, Burke says. And thus rhetoric, as he sees it, potentially builds community. It can tear it down as well. In the end, rhetoric relies on an unconscious desire for acting-together, for taking a 'sub-stance' together".

== See also ==
- Adoptionism
- Arianism
- Chalcedonian Definition
- Eutychianism
- Glossary of rhetorical terms
- Hypostatic union
- Identification in Burkean rhetoric
- Jesus in Christianity
- Miaphysitism
- Subordinationism
- Trinity

== Sources ==
- Brown, Stephen F. (1996). "Theology and Philosophy". Medieval Latin: An Introduction and Bibliographical Guide. Washington, D.C.: CUA Press. pp. 267–287. ISBN 978-0813208428.
- Owens, Joseph (1951). The Doctrine of Being in the Aristotelian Metaphysics: A Study in the Greek Background of Mediaeval Thought. Toronto: Pontifical Institute of Mediaeval Studies.
