= Sabellius =

Third-century presbyter and theologian

Sabellius (fl. ca. 215) was a third-century priest and theologian who most likely taught in Rome, but may have been a North African from Libya. Basil and others call him a Libyan from Pentapolis, but this seems to rest on the fact that Pentapolis was a place where the teachings of Sabellius thrived, according to Dionysius of Alexandria, c. 260. What is known of Sabellius is drawn mostly from the polemical writings of his opponents.

== History ==
The Catholic Encyclopedia writes:

It is true that it is easy to suppose Tertullian and Hippolytus to have misrepresented the opinions of their opponents, but it cannot be proved that Cleomenes was not a follower of the heretical Noetus, and that Sabellius did not issue from his school; further, it is not obvious that Tertullian would attack Callistus under a nickname.

Sabellius' opposition to the idea of the Trinity led to his excommunication as a heretic by Callixtus in AD 220. Wace and Bunsen have both suggested that Calixtus' action was motivated more by a desire for unity rather than by conviction.

== Theology ==
Sabellius taught that God was single and indivisible, with Father, Son, and Holy Spirit being three modes or manifestations of one divine Person.

=== Modalism ===
This understanding has been called Sabellianism or modalistic monarchianism. A Sabellian modalist would say that the One God successively revealed Himself to man throughout time as the Father in Creation; the Son in Redemption; and the Spirit in Sanctification and Regeneration. (Because of this focus on God's revelation of himself to man, Modalism is often confused with economic Trinitarianism).

- The suggestion of development and change within the Godhead was seen as contradicting the concept of impassibility.
- It also stood in contrast to the position of distinct persons existing within a single godhead by representing Father, Son and Spirit as different “modes” (hence the term "modalism"), “aspects” or “faces”, “roles”, "masks" (persona in Latin) that God presented successively to the world.
- More importantly it stood against the Trinitarian teaching that "God was one God in Father" rather than One in the Father's essence only.

It has been noted also that the Greek term "homoousios", which Athanasius of Alexandria favored, was actually a term that was reported to be put forth and favored also by Sabellius, and was a term that many followers of Athanasius took issue with and were uneasy about. Their objection to the term "homoousios" was that it was considered to be "un-Scriptural, suspicious, and of a Sabellian tendency." Athanasius, however, used the term differently than Sabellius, affirming oneness of the Divine Essence while maintaining the distinctions between the Divine Persons.

The term "homoousios" was accepted, however, at the Council of Nicaea in 325 A.D., using the Athanasian formula and doctrine, of the Father and Son being distinct persons, though co-eternal, co-equal, and con-substantial. The objections to using the term were addressed by clarifying that it was not being used in the Sabellian sense of oneness of Person, but rather to denote oneness of Essence while affirming the distinctions of the Persons or "hypostases".

=== Persona ===
According to Epiphanius of Salamis, Sabellius used the sun's characteristics as an analogy of God's nature. Just as the sun has "three powers" (warmth, light, and circular form), so God has three aspects: the warming power answers to the Holy Spirit; the illuminating power, to the Son; and the form or figure, to the Father. Sabellius used the term "prosopa" which is Greek for "faces" to describe how the person of God has three faces, this idea is found in 2 Corinthians 4:6 "...God’s glory displayed in the face (prosopon - singular form of prosopa) of Christ.

=== God in essence ===
Johann Lorenz von Mosheim described Sabellius' views:

"But while Sabellius maintained that there was but one divine person, he still believed the distinction of Father, Son and Holy Spirit, described in the Scriptures, to be a real distinction, and not a mere appellative or nominal one. That is, he believed the one divine person whom he recognized, to have three distinct forms, which are really different, and which should not be confounded".

== Non-Trinitarian ==
The Teachings of Sabellius were most vigorously opposed by Tertullian in North Africa and Hippolytus in Rome, who both proposed a hierarchical trinity of subordinate persons. Tertullian is reported to have given Sabellius' doctrine the name Patripassianism, meaning ‘the father suffered’, since Sabellius made no true distinction of persons between the Father and the Son. The term is from the Latin words pater for "father", and passus from the verb "to suffer", because it implied that the Father suffered on the cross. Tertullian coined the term in his work Adversus Praxeas, Chapter I: "By this Praxeas did a twofold service for the devil at Rome: he drove away prophecy, and he brought in heresy; he put to flight the Paraclete, and he crucified the Father." This charge he applied to Sabellius as well. This is a distortion of Sabellius' teaching according to Clissold, who quotes scholars who have appealed to Epiphanius' writings. Epiphanius (died 403) says that in his time Sabellians were still numerous in Mesopotamia and Rome - a fact confirmed by an inscription discovered at Rome in 1742, evidently erected by Sabellian Christians.

== Modern movements ==
Although there are some doctrinal characteristics shared by a modern group called Oneness Pentecostals with those of Sabellius, the former do not teach the exact doctrine of Dispensational Modalism as purportedly taught by Sabellius. Some consider this, however, an unfounded assertion, as we have no writings of Sabellius to definitively prove for one way or another.

So it cannot be certain whether Sabellius taught a dispensational Modalism or taught what is known today as the Oneness Pentecostal theology since all we have of his teaching comes through the writing of his enemies. All of his original works were destroyed. For example, the doctrines that were purportedly believed by the Templars have recently been shown to be falsifications. The following excerpts demonstrate some of the known doctrinal characteristics of ancient Sabellians which may compare with the doctrines in the modern Oneness movement. Both movements hold that the Biblical God is one Person, not Three. And that Father, Son, and Spirit are different aspects or manifestations of that one Person, and not three distinct persons.

Sabellianism was doctrine adhered to by a sect of the Montanists. The Montanists are the same sect that Tertullian himself was a member of when he wrote (the anti-Sabellian) Against Praxeas. Apparently then, there were both Trinitarian and modalist participants in the Montanism which was later condemned. Cyprian wrote of Sabellians "How, when God the Father is not known-nay, is even blasphemed-can they who among the heretics are said to be baptized in the name of Christ only, be judged to have obtained the remission of sins?" In 225 AD Hippolytus spoke of them saying "Some of them assent to the heresy of the Noetians, affirming the Father Himself is the Son." Victorinus had this to say of them "Some had doubts about the baptism of those who appeared to recognize the same Father with the Son with us, yet who received the new prophets."

It is reported that some Sabellians experienced glossolalia (speaking in tongues) and baptized in the "shorter formula" because of their denial of the Trinity. Sabellians were referred to by the following Church fathers: Dionysius (c.200-265 AD) wrote "Those baptized in the name of three persons...though baptized by heretics...shall not be rebaptized. But those converted from other heresies shall be perfected by the baptism of the Holy Church." "Sabellius...blasphemes in saying that the Son Himself is the Father and vice versa." "Jesus commands them to baptize into the Father, Son, and Holy Spirit-not into a unipersonal God."

Sabellianism teaching of Modalism and singular name baptism was also accompanied by glossolalia and prophecy among the above-mentioned sect of Montanists. In 225 AD Tertullian speaks of "those who would deserve the excellent gifts of the spirit-and who...by means of the Holy Spirit would obtain the gift of language, wisdom, and knowledge." However, none of these practices were the source of controversy concerning the Sabellians - - it was simply their Christology which proved most offensive. In any case, unlike many others deemed as heretics, the Sabellians were never excommunicated from the Church at large. One hundred years later, the Deacon Arius would compare Bishop Alexander to Sabellius, in effect accusing Alexander and Athanasius of reviving an old heresy, that at the very least had Sabellian leanings.

== See also ==
- For the Patriarch of Alexandria, see Avilius of Alexandria.
- Sabellianism
- Oneness Pentecostal
- Subordinationist
