= Praxeas =

Late 2nd/early 3rd century Christian theologian

Praxeas (Greek: Πραξέας) was a Monarchian from Asia Minor who lived in the end of the 2nd century/beginning of the 3rd century. He believed in the unity of the Godhead and vehemently disagreed with any attempt at division of the personalities or personages of the Father, Son, and Holy Spirit in the Christian Church. He was opposed by Tertullian in his tract Against Praxeas (Adversus Praxean), and was influential in preventing the Roman Church from granting recognition to the New Prophecy.

An early anti-Montanist, he is known only by virtue of Tertullian's book "Adversus Praxean". His name in the list of heresies appended to the "De Praescriptionibus" of that writer (an anonymous epitome of the lost "Syntagma" of Hippolytus) is a correction made by some ancient diorthotes for Noetus.

He taught Monarchian doctrine there, or at least a doctrine which Tertullian regarded as Monarchian: "Paracletum fugavit et patrem crucifixit."- "Having driven out the Paraclete, he [Praxeas] now crucified the Father". He was refuted, evidently by Tertullian himself, and gave an explanation or recantation in writing, the "carnal" as he affects to call them, which, when Tertullian wrote several years afterwards, was still in the hands of the authorities of the Carthaginian Church. Monarchianism had sprung up again, but Tertullian does not mention its leaders at Rome, and directs his whole argument against his old enemy Praxeas.

But the arguments which he refutes are doubtless those of Epigonus and Cleomenes. There is little reason for thinking that Praxeas was a heresiarch, and less for identifying him with Noetus, or one of his disciples. He was very likely merely an adversary of the Montanists who used some quasi-Monarchian expressions when at Carthage, but afterwards revised them when he saw they might be misunderstood.

Praxeas is mentioned in the Belgic Confession (1562) as and example of "certain false Christians and heretics... who were rightly condemned by the holy fathers."

== See also ==
- Sabellius
- Pope Zephyrinus
- Pope Callixtus I
