= Homoousion =

Christian theological term and concept

Homoousion (/ˌhɒmoʊˈuːsiɒn, ˌhoʊm-/ HO(H)M-oh-OO-see-on; Ancient Greek: ὁμοούσιον, lit. 'same in being, same in essence', from ὁμός, homós, "same" and οὐσία, ousía, "being" or "essence") is a Christian theological term, most notably used in the Nicene Creed for describing Jesus (God the Son) as "same in being" or "same in essence" with God the Father (ὁμοούσιον τῷ Πατρί). The same term is also applied to the Holy Spirit in order to designate him as being "same in essence" with the Father and the Son. Those notions became cornerstones of theology in Nicene Christianity, and also represent one of the most important theological concepts within the Trinitarian doctrinal understanding of God.

== Terminology ==
The term ὁμοούσιον (homoousion), the accusative case form of ὁμοούσιος (homoousios, "consubstantial"), was adopted at the First Council of Nicaea (325) in order to clarify the ontology of Christ. From its Greek original, the term was translated into other languages. In Latin, which is lacking a present participle of the verb 'to be', two main corresponding variants occurred. Since the Aristotelian term ousia was commonly translated in Latin as essentia (essence) or substantia (substance), the Greek term homoousios was consequently translated into Latin as coessentialis or consubstantialis, hence the English terms coessential and consubstantial. Some modern scholars say that homoousios is properly translated as coessential, while consubstantial has a much wider spectrum of meanings. The Book of Common Prayer renders the term as "being of one substance with the Father."

From ὁμοούσιος (coessential), the theological term ὁμοουσιότης (coessentiality) was also derived. It was used by Greek-speaking authors, like Didymus of Alexandria and other theologians.

== Pre-Nicene usage ==
The term ὁμοούσιος (homoousios, "of the same essence") was in use prior to its adoption at the First Council of Nicaea, with the earliest extant occurrences appearing in certain 2nd-century Gnostic writings, where the word was used in discussions of relationships between divine beings or emanations. Modern scholars note, however, that the term belongs more broadly to the vocabulary of Greek philosophical discourse concerning ousia (“essence” or “substance”), and was not originally a uniquely Christian or Gnostic technical term. Scholars have often noted that its appearance in some Gnostic texts does not imply Nicene dependence on Gnosticism, and the direction of influence remains debated, with the possibility that influence may also have run from proto-orthodox Christianity to Gnostic writers.

=== Connection to earlier Greek philosophy ===
Use of the term ousia was a common and vital part of ancient Greek metaphysical terminology, especially in the works of Plato and Aristotle, where it was used to discuss the definitive substance and the nature of reality. In later philosophical tradition, including Middle Platonism and Neoplatonism, the term was used more and more to describe the relationships between divine and metaphysical principles and subsistence.

Though the term homoousion was never used by pre-Christian philosophers, the term comes forth from this wider philosophical vocabulary concerning shared substance, which was available to a variety of religious and philosophical writers in late antiquity.

=== Use within Gnosticism ===
In Gnostic texts, the word ὁμοούσιος is used with the following meanings:

- Identity of substance between generator and generated
- Identity of substance between things generated of the same substance
- Identity of substance between the partners of a syzygy

For example, Basilides, the first known Gnostic writer to use ὁμοούσιος in the first half of the 2nd century AD, speaks of a threefold sonship consubstantial with the god who is not. The Valentinian Gnostic Ptolemy says in his letter to Flora that it is the nature of the good God to beget and bring forth only beings similar to, and consubstantial with, himself. The term ὁμοούσιος was used by the 2nd-century Gnostics, as is noted by the orthodox heresiologists, though this Gnostic use of the term had no reference to the specific relationship between Father and Son, as is the case in the Nicene Creed.

=== Use by ante-Nicene Church Fathers ===
Tertullian of Carthage (c.155 - c.220), who was the first Latin writer to use the term Trinity, also uses the phrase unius substantiae (Latin: of one substance) when responding to the Sabellian Praxeus, but clarifies this by stating that this substance is held duarum personarum (Latin: by two persons). Unius substantiae is usually interpreted as the Latin equivalent to homoousion.

Origen of Alexandria (c.185 - c.253) seems to have been the first Trinitarian writer to explicitly use ὁμοούσιος to explain the relation of the Father to the Logos. In an exegetical comment on Hebrews 1:3, cited in the first book of the Apology for Origen by Pamphilus and Eusebius, Origen explains the special relationship of Christ, the Wisdom of God (Wisdom 7:25), with the Father through analogies such as vapor or the outflow of glory in which he states that the Logos proceeds from the Father yet is of the same essence, indicating an ontological unity while allowing for a distinction in rank or role. Origen's orthodoxy has been called into question on several occasions, however, given that he may have held to the doctrine of subordinationism which was later condemned and in certain places he even calls the Son "a creature", though it is unclear whether he considered the Son to be a created being.

Pope Dionysius of Alexandria (c.190–264) also uses the term to refer to the equal relationship between the persons of the Godhead in a letter to Pope Dionysius of Rome in response to the Arian Christology of a certain Theognustus.

Finally, the term was directly used by Athanasius of Alexandria and the Trinitarians at the Council of Nicaea to mean that the Son was taken to have exactly the same essence with the Father, and the Nicene Creed explicitly states that the Son is as immutable as his Father.

== Adoption in the Nicene Creed ==
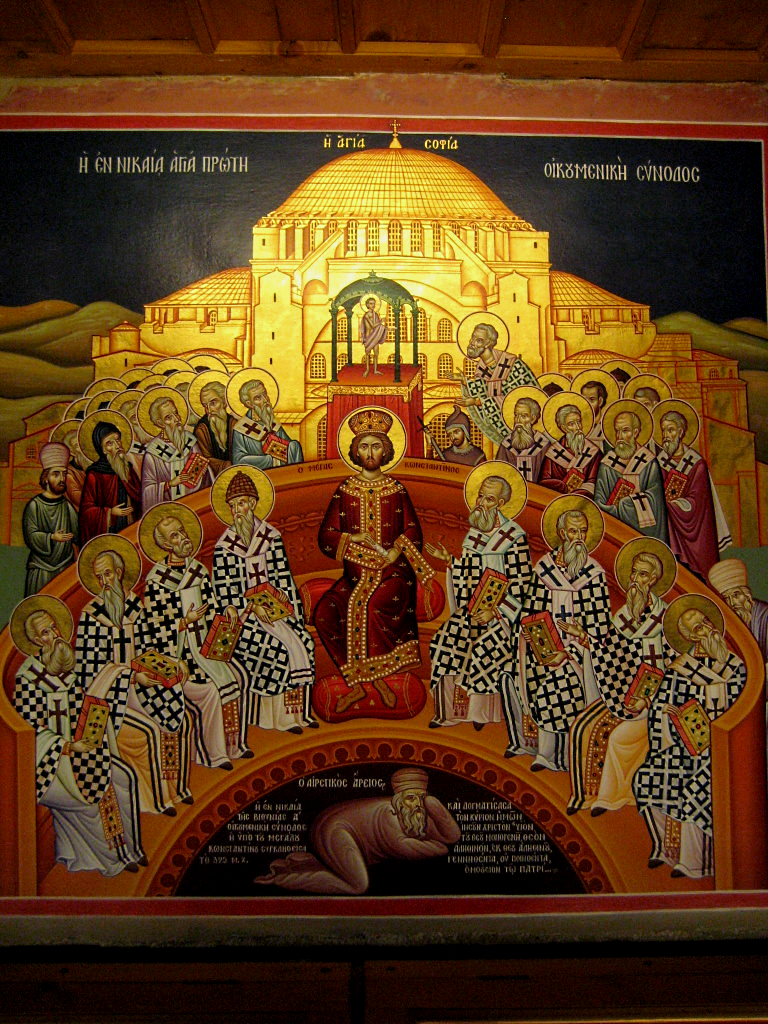
The First Council of Nicaea

At the Council of Nicaea, called by the newly converted Roman Emperor Constantine in 325 AD to deal with the Arian heretics, the use of the word homoousios in the Nicene Creed remained controversial. It was a term with which many Trinitarians were actually uncomfortable. The Semi-Arians in particular objected to it. Their objection to this term was that it was considered to be "un-Scriptural, suspicious, and of a Sabellian tendency". This was because Sabellius also considered the Father and the Son to be "one substance", meaning that, to Sabellius, the Father and the Son were "one essential Person", though operating in different faces, roles, or modes.

The Arians themselves as well as the Semi-Arians preferred the use of the term ὁμοιούσιος (homoioúsios or alternative uncontracted form ὁμοιοούσιος homoiooúsios; from ὅμοιος, hómoios, "similar", rather than ὁμός, homós, "same, common", usually rendered "of a similar substance") in order to emphasise the separations and/or distinctions among the three hypostases in the Godhead.

Alexander of Alexandria and Hosius of Corduba objected to this Sabellian association, arguing that the term did not imply a confusion of persons but affirmed that the Son truly shares the same divine essence as the Father. The young deacon Athanasius of Alexandria and the later Cappadocian Fathers became the most prominent defenders of this interpretation, and as such homoousion became a consistent mark of Nicene orthodoxy in both East and West.

The Council earned the endorsement of all but two of the attending bishops for the inclusion of the word.

=== Subsequent Arian formulas ===
Traditional Trinitarian Christology teaches that Jesus Christ is the physical manifestation of the Logos (or the Word), and consequently possesses all of the inherent, ineffable perfections which religion and philosophy attribute to the Supreme Being. How this was expressed or explained varied greatly among the ante-Nicene Church Fathers, but following the First Council of Constantinople in AD 381, the language that became universally accepted was that three distinct and infinite hypostases, or divine persons, the Father, the Son, and the Holy Spirit, fully possess the very same divine ousia.

During the 4th century a number of alternative Christological formulations arose in connection with the teachings of Arius, which sought to explain the relationship between the Father and the Son without affirming the doctrine of homoousios. These positions, often differing significantly from one another, are commonly grouped under the broad label of Arianism and included several distinct tendencies:

- Homoiousianism (from ὅμοιος, hómoios, "similar", as opposed to ὁμός, homós, "same, common"), which maintained that the Son was "like in substance" but not necessarily to be identified with the essence of the Father.
- Homoeanism (also from ὅμοιος), which declared that the Son was similar to God the Father, without reference to substance or essence. Some supporters of Homoean formulae also supported one of the other descriptions. Other Homoeans declared that the father was so incomparable and ineffably transcendent that even the ideas of likeness, similarity or identity in substance or essence with the subordinate Son and Holy Spirit were heretical and not justified by the Gospels. They held that the Father was like the Son in some sense but that even to speak of ousia was impertinent speculation.
- Heteroousianism (including Anomoeanism), which held that God the Father and the Son were different in substance and/or attributes.

These competing formulations produced numerous theological disputes during the 4th century. They were continually opposed by defenders of the Nicene faith, most notably Athanasius of Alexandria, who argued that only the doctrine of homoousios adequately expressed the full divinity of the Son and preserved the Church’s traditional understanding of salvation. Through the theological work of orthodox Nicene theologians and the decisions of later councils, the Nicene confession of the Son’s consubstantiality with the Father eventually prevailed and became the defining standard of orthodox Trinitarian doctrine in both the Greek East and Latin West.

The Nicene Creed is the official doctrine of most Christian churches—the Catholic Church, Eastern Orthodox Church, Oriental Orthodox Churches, Church of the East, Lutheran Churches, Moravian Church, Anglican Communion, and Reformed Churches as well as other mainline Protestant and evangelical churches with regard to the ontological status of the three persons or hypostases of the Trinity: Father, Son, and Holy Spirit.

Both the Nicene and Athanasian creeds affirm the Son as both begotten of, and equal to his Father. If so, many concepts of the Holy Trinity would appear to have already existed relatively early while the specific language used to affirm the doctrine continued to develop.

== See also ==
- Consubstantiality
- Hypostatic union

== Bibliography ==
- Athanasopoulos, Constantinos; Schneider, Christoph, eds. (2013). Divine Essence and Divine Energies: Ecumenical Reflections on the Presence of God. Cambridge, UK: James Clarke & Co. ISBN 978-0-227-90008-6.
- Beatrice, Pier Franco (2002). "The Word "Homoousios" from Hellenism to Christianity". Church History: Studies in Christianity and Culture. 71 (2): 243–272. doi:10.1017/S0009640700095688. S2CID 162605872.
- Bethune-Baker, James (2004) [1901]. The Meaning of Homoousios in the Constantinopolitan Creed. Cambridge, U.K.: The University Press. ISBN 978-1-59244-898-2.
- Florovsky, Georges (1987). The Eastern Fathers of the Fourth Century. Vaduz: Büchervertriebsanstalt. ISBN 978-3-905238-07-5.
- Grillmeier, Aloys (1986), Christ in Christian Tradition: from the Council of Chalcedon (451) to Gregory the Great (590-604), Louisville: Westminster John Knox Press, ISBN 0-664-22160-2
- Loux, Michael J. (2008) [1991]. Primary Ousia: An Essay on Aristotle's Metaphysics Z and H. Ithaca & London: Cornell University Press. ISBN 978-0-8014-7488-0.
- Pásztori-Kupán, István (2006). Theodoret of Cyrus. London & New York: Routledge. ISBN 978-1-134-39176-9.
- Weedman, Mark (2007). The Trinitarian Theology of Hilary of Poitiers. Leiden-Boston: Brill. ISBN 978-90-04-16224-2.
