= Subordinationism =

Trinitarian doctrine in Christianity

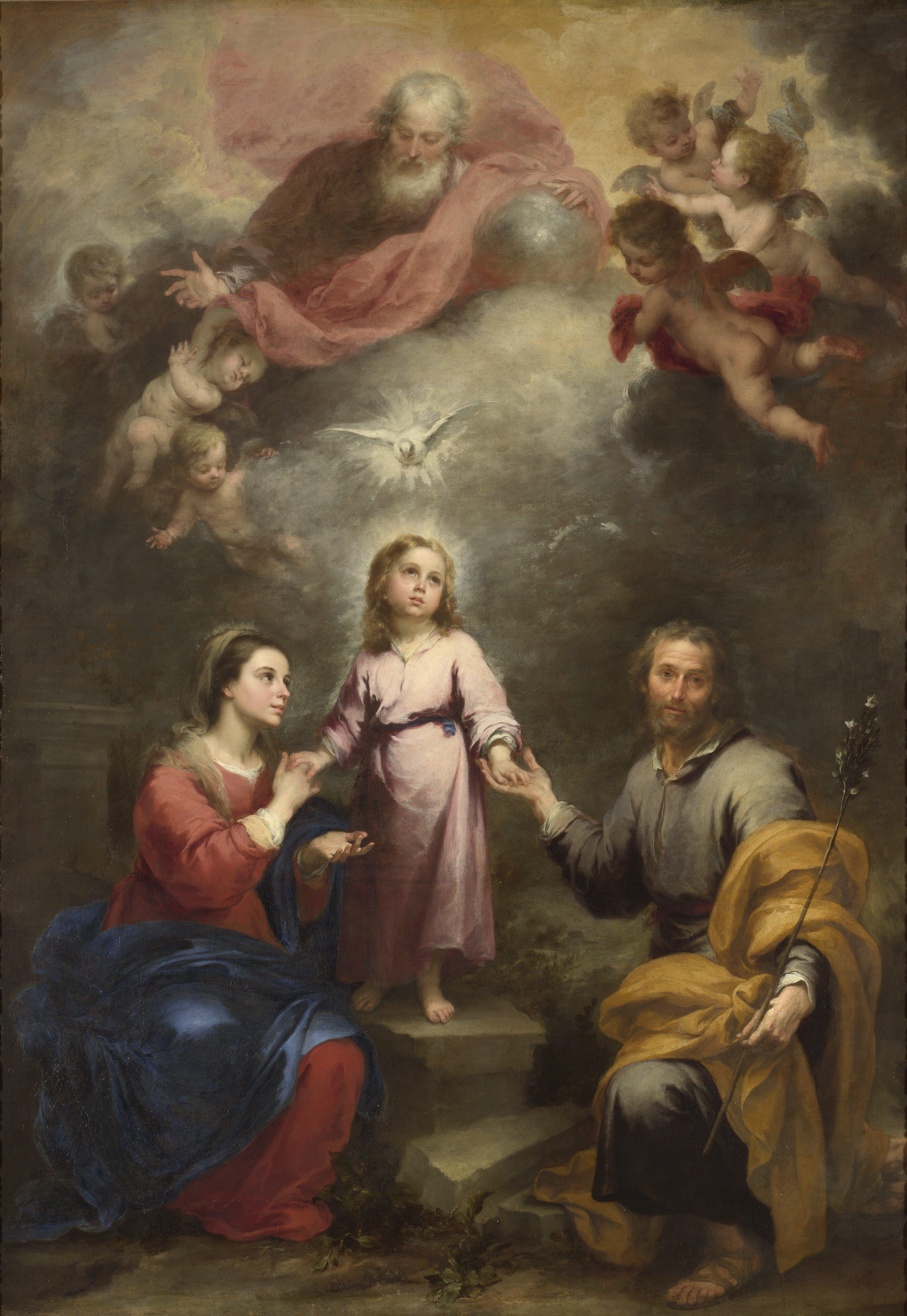
The "Heavenly Trinity" joined to the "Earthly Trinity" through the Incarnation of the Son – The Heavenly and Earthly Trinities by Murillo (c. 1677)

Subordinationism is a Trinitarian doctrine wherein the Son (and sometimes also the Holy Spirit) is subordinate to the Father, not only in submission and role, but with actual ontological subordination to varying degrees. It posits a hierarchical ranking of the persons of the Social Trinity, implying ontological subordination of the persons of the Son and the Holy Spirit. It was condemned as heretical in the Second Council of Constantinople.

Subordinationism is not to be confused with Arianism; Subordinationism, as opposed to Arianism, confesses the eternal and necessary existence of the Son and Holy Spirit alongside the Father, and has been generally viewed as closer to the Nicene-Constantinopolitan view than Arianism.

== History ==
=== Ante-Nicene ===
According to Badcock, virtually all orthodox theologians prior to the Arian controversy in the latter half of the fourth century were subordinationists to some extent, which also applies to Irenaeus, Tertullian, Hippolytus, Justin Martyr and Novatian. It was also found in the Ascension of Isaiah. However, there may have been some Ante-Nicene Christian writers who did not affirm subordinationism. Ignatius of Antioch, Athenagoras and the early Odes of Solomon seem to reflect a non-subordinationist understanding of the trinity. Additionally, theologians such as Emile Mersch have disputed the claim that Irenaeus taught any form of subordinationism.

Origen of Alexandria (AD 185 – c. 253) has often been interpreted as Subordinationist. However, some modern researchers have argued that Origen might have actually been anti-Subordinationist and that his own Trinitarian theology inspired the Trinitarian theology of the later Cappadocian Fathers.

=== Arius and Alexander ===
The dispute between Alexander and Arius, which started the Arian Controversy, arose in 318 or 319. At the beginning of the controversy nobody knew the right answer. Arius (c. 250 – 336), a clergyman of Alexandria in Egypt, "objected to Alexander's (the bishop of the church in that city) apparent carelessness in blurring the distinction of nature between the Father and the Son by his emphasis on eternal generation". According to Socrates of Constantinople, Arius' position was as follows:

"If the Father begat the Son, he that was begotten had a beginning of existence: and from this it is evident, that there was a time when the Son was not. It therefore necessarily follows that he [the Son] had his substance from nothing."

As explained in the article on the First Council of Nicaea, according to Kelly, the dispute was over whether the Son had a beginning. To argue this point, the parties referred to the source of the Son's existence:

To justify his view that the Son had no beginning, Alexander argued that the Son had been 'begotten' by the Father from his own being. But Arius argued that the Son was created out of nothing, and therefore had a beginning.

Alexander, therefore, described the Son as equal with the Father while Arius described Him as subordinate to the Father.

=== First Council of Nicaea ===
For the reasons of him being moderate in the religious and political spectrum of beliefs, Constantine I turned to Eusebius of Caesarea to try to make peace between the Arians and their opponents at Nicaea I.

Eusebius of Caesarea wrote, in On the Theology of the Church, that the Nicene Creed is a full expression of Christian theology, which begins with: "We believe in One God..." Eusebius goes on to explain how initially the goal was not to expel Arius and his supporters, but to find a Creed on which all of them could agree and unite.

Eusebius of Caesarea suggested a compromise wording of a creed, in which the Son would be affirmed as "homoiousios", or "of similar substance/nature" with the Father. But Alexander and Athanasius saw that this compromise would allow the Arians to continue to teach their heresy, but stay technically within orthodoxy, and therefore rejected that wording.

"The decisive catchword of the Nicene confession, namely, homoousios ... comes from no less a person than the emperor himself. To the present day no one has cleared up the problem of where the emperor got the term. Homoousios means "of the same substance/nature" with the Father. Many theologians were uncomfortable with this term. "Their objection to the term homoousian was that it was considered to be un-scriptural, suspicious, and "of a Sabellian tendency". "But the emperor exerted considerable influence. Consequently, the statement was approved by all except three."

=== Post-Nicene ===
Athanasius opposed subordinationism and was highly hostile to hierarchical rankings of the divine persons. It was also opposed by Augustine and Gregory of Nyssa. It was condemned in the 6th century along with other doctrines taught by Origen.

Epiphanius, writing against Origen, attacked his views of subordinationism.

=== Sixteenth-century Reformed ===
In his Institutes of the Christian Religion, book 1, chapter 13, Calvin attacks those in the Reformation family who while they confess "that there are three [divine] persons" speak of the Father as "the essence giver" as if he were "truly and properly the sole God". This, he says, "definitely cast[s] the Son down from his rank". This is because it implies that the Father is God in a way the Son is not. Modern scholars are agreed that this was a sixteenth-century form of what today is called "subordinationism". Richard Muller says Calvin recognised that what his opponents were teaching "amounted to a radical subordination of the second and third persons, with the result that the Father alone is truly God". Ellis adds that this teaching also implied tritheism, three separate Gods.

=== Seventeenth-century Arminianism ===
Jacobus Arminius (1560–1609), in contrast to Calvin, argued that the begetting of the Son should be understood as the generation of the person of the Son and therefore the attribute of self-existence, or aseitas, belonged to the Father alone. His disciple, Simon Bisschop (1583–1643), who assumed the name Episcopius, went further speaking openly and repeatedly of the subordination of the Son. He wrote, "It is certain from these same scriptures that to these people's divinity and divine perfections [the Son and the Spirit] are attributed, but not collaterally or co-ordinately, but subordinately." Ellis says: "His discussion of the importance of recognizing subordination among the persons takes up nearly half of the chapter on the Trinity, and the following four chapters are largely taken up with the implications of this subordination." In seventeenth-century England, Arminian subordinationism gained wide support from leading English divines, including Bishop George Bull (1634–1710), Bishop John Pearson (1683–1689) and Samuel Clarke (1675–1729), one of the most learned biblical scholars of his day.

== Current views ==
=== Eastern Orthodox ===
The Eastern Orthodox doctrine of the Trinity is defined by the Monarchy of the Father, the teaching that the Father is the sole cause (aitia), source (pēgē), and principle (archē) of divinity, from whom the Son is eternally begotten, and the Holy Spirit eternally proceeds. Within this framework, the Son and the Spirit are understood to be eternally subordinate to the Father in terms of personal origin, while remaining fully consubstantial (homoousios) and co-equal in divine nature. As patristic scholar R.P.C. Hanson observed, prior to the late fourth century, "virtually every theologian, East and West, accepted some form of subordinationism," a tendency that was reflected in the writings of pre-Nicene fathers such as Irenaeus of Lyons, Justin Martyr, and Origen, who used subordinating language when describing the Son's relationship to the Father. The Cappadocian Fathers systematized this eternal order (taxis), with St. Basil the Great teaching that the Holy Spirit is joined to the Father "through the one Son" and that goodness and holiness reach from the Father "through the Only-begotten to the Spirit," while St. Gregory of Nazianzus distinguished the Son's generation (gennesis) from the Spirit's procession (ekporeusis), both originating from the Father alone. Orthodox theology maintains that this eternal derivation from the Father implies no inferiority of nature—the Son and Spirit are "co-eternal" and "co-equal" because they possess the identical divine essence, receiving it eternally from the Father—but it does establish an eternal relationship of causation in which the Father alone is the source of divinity, a distinction that underlies the Orthodox rejection of the Filioque on the grounds that adding the Son as a second source would compromise the Father's sole monarchy.

=== Catholics ===
The Catholic Church also believes that the Son is begotten of the Father and the Holy Spirit is proceeding from the Father through / and from the Son. Catholic theologian John Hardon wrote that subordinationism "denies that the second and third persons are consubstantial with the Father. Therefore it denies their true divinity." Arius "made a formal heresy of" subordinationism. The International Theological Commission wrote that "many Christian theologians borrowed from Hellenism the notion of a secondary god (deuteros theos), or of an intermediate god, or even of a demiurge." Subordinationism was "latent in some of the Apologists and in Origen." The Son was, for Arius, in "an intermediate position between the Father and the creatures." Nicaea I "defined that the Son is consubstantial (homoousios) with the Father. In so doing, the Church both repudiated the Arian compromise with Hellenism and deeply altered the shape of Greek, especially Platonist and neo-Platonist, metaphysics. In a manner of speaking, it demythicized Hellenism and effected a Christian purification of it. In the act of dismissing the notion of an intermediate being, the Church recognized only two modes of being: uncreated (nonmade) and created."

=== Lutherans ===
Subordinationism in yet another form gained support from a number of Lutheran theologians in Germany in the nineteenth century. Stockhardt, writing in opposition, says the well-known theologians Thomasius, Frank, Delitsch, Martensen, von Hoffman and Zoeckler all argued that the Father is God in the primary sense, and the Son and the Spirit are God in second and third degree. He criticises most sharply the Leipzig theologian, Karl Friedrich Augustus Kahnis (1814–1888). For these Lutheran theologians, God was God, Jesus Christ was God in some lesser way. The American Lutheran theologian, F. Pieper (1852–1931), argues that behind this teaching lay an acceptance of ‘modernism’, or what we would call today, theological ‘liberalism’.

More recently John Kleinig, of Australian Lutheran College, promoted a form of subordinationism and concluded:

Well then, is the exalted Christ in any way subordinate to the Father right now? The answer is both "yes" and "no". It all depends on whether we are speaking about Him in His nature as God, or about Him in his office as the exalted Son of God. On the one hand, He is not subordinate to the Father in His divine essence, status, and majesty. On the other hand, He is, I hold, subordinate to the Father in His vice-regal office and His work as prophet, priest, and king. He is operationally subordinate to the Father. In the present operation of the triune God in the church and the world, He is the mediator between God the Father and humankind. The exalted Christ receives everything from His Father to deliver to us, so that in turn, He can bring us back to the Father.

=== New Calvinists ===
While contemporary Evangelicals believe the historically agreed fundamentals of the Christian faith, including the Trinity, among the New Calvinist formula, the Trinity is one God in three equal persons, among whom there is "economic subordination" (as, for example, when the Son obeys the Father). As recently as 1977, the concept of economic subordinationism has been advanced in New Calvinist circles. In The New Testament teaching on the role relationship of men and women, Presbyterian minister George W. Knight III wrote that the Son is functionally―but not ontologically―subordinate to the Father, thus positing that eternal functional subordination does not necessarily imply ontological subordination. The reception of such doctrine among other Evangelicals has yielded certain controversies.

=== Nontrinitarians ===
The mainstream Christian doctrine of the Trinity may be described as the teaching that God is three distinct hypostases or persons who are coeternal, coequal, and indivisibly united in one being, or essence (from the Greek ousia). The three largest denominations that do not accept the Trinity doctrine are the Church of Jesus Christ of Latter-day Saints, Jehovah's Witnesses and the Iglesia ni Cristo. The Socinians also do not accept the Trinity doctrine.

=== Scholars ===
==== Oxford Encyclopedia ====
According to the Oxford Encyclopedia:

Subordinationism means to consider Christ, as Son of God, as inferior to the Father.

This tendency was strong in the 2nd- and 3rd-century theology. It is evident in theologians like Justin Martyr, Tertullian, Origen, Novatian, and Irenaeus. Irenaeus, for example, commenting on Christ's statement, “the Father is greater than I” (John 14:28), has no difficulty in considering Christ as inferior to the Father.

In those centuries subordination was developed in Logos Christology which, partly under the influence of middle platonism, explained Christ as the divine logos of Greek philosophy; mediator between the high God and this world of change and decay.

When Origen enlarged the conception of the Trinity to include the Holy Spirit, he explained the Son as inferior to the Father and the Holy Spirit as inferior to the Son.

Subordination is based on statements which Jesus made, such as (a) that “the Father is greater than I” (John 14:28); (b) that, with respect to when the day of Judgment will be, “of that day or hour no one knows, not even the angels in heaven, nor the Son, but the Father alone” (Mark 13:32), and that He spoke of God as somebody else (Mark 11:18).

==== Oxford dictionary of the Christian Church ====
According to Oxford Dictionary of the Christian Church, Subordinationism "regards either the Son as subordinate to the Father or the Holy Spirit as subordinate to both. It is a characteristic tendency in much Christian teaching of the first three centuries, and is a marked feature of such otherwise orthodox Fathers as" Justin Martyr and Irenaeus. Reasons for this tendency include:

Consistent with Greek philosophy, the thought that God is transcendent (that He exist beyond the normal or physical level), and therefore that He is unable to interact directly with the physical world, implies that Christ is a lesser being.

The Bible presents God as one (monotheism).

Although others interpret the New Testament differently, John 14:28 (“the Father is greater than I”) and similar texts presents Christ as subordinate.

During the Arian Controversy of the 4th century, Arius and his followers did regard the Son as divine, but the words theos or deus, for the first four centuries of the existence of Christianity had a wide variety of meanings. There were many different types and grades of deity in popular thought and religion. Arius, therefore, held that the Son was divine by grace and not by nature, and that He was created by the Father, though in a creation outside time. In response, the Nicene Creed, particularly as revised by the second ecumenical council in Constantinople I in 381, by affirming the co-equality of the Three Persons of the Trinity, condemned subordinationism.

Until the middle of the fourth century very little attention had been paid to the Holy Spirit by the theologians. The 4th century Pneumatomachi rejected the divinity of the Holy Ghost. The HarperCollins Encyclopedia of Catholicism, “God,” p. 568, states that the teaching of the three Cappadocian Fathers “made it possible for the Council of Constantinople (381) to affirm the divinity of the Holy Spirit, which up to that point had nowhere been clearly stated, not even in Scripture.”

==== The Westminster Handbook to Patristic Theology ====
Subordinationism. The term is a common retrospective concept used to denote theologians of the early church who affirmed the divinity of the Son or Spirit of God, but conceived it somehow as a lesser form of divinity than that of the Father. It is a modern concept that is so vague that is that it does not illuminate much of the theology of the pre-Nicene teachers, where a subordinationist presupposition was widely and unreflectively shared.

This handbook refers to subordination as "retrospective" and a "modern concept" because it is only able to define this term with the hindsight of the developments of the fourth century.

==== Kevin Giles ====
Ante-Nicene subordinationism. It is generally conceded that the ante-Nicene Fathers were subordinationists. This is clearly evident in the writings of the second-century "Apologists.". ... Irenaeus follows a similar path... The theological enterprise begun by the Apologists and Irenaeus was continued in the West by Hippolytus and Tertullian... The ante-Nicene Fathers did their best to explain how the one God could be a Trinity of three persons. It was the way they approached this dilemma that caused them insoluble problems and led them into subordinationism. They began with the premise that there was one God who was the Father, and then tried to explain how the Son and the Spirit could also be God. By the fourth century it was obvious that this approach could not produce an adequate theology of the Trinity.

Mark Baddeley has criticized Giles for what he sees as a conflation of ontological and relational subordinationism, and for his supposed generalisation that "the ante-Nicene Fathers were subordinationists."

== See also ==
- Adoptionism
- Binitarianism
- Christology
- Semi-Arianism
- Unitarianism
