= Adoptionism =

Christian theological doctrine

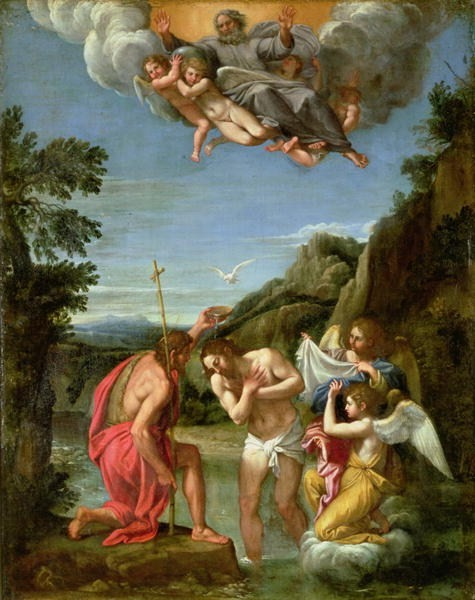
Francesco Albani's The Baptism of Christ, when Jesus became one with God according to adoptionism

Adoptionism, closely associated with dynamic monarchianism, is an early Christian nontrinitarian theological doctrine, subsequently revived in various forms. Adoptionism is a theology about relationship, which does not affirm the virgin birth and holds that Jesus was adopted as the Son of God at his baptism, his resurrection, or his ascension. Dynamic Monarchianism does not hold Jesus' sonship was through adoption. Dynamic monarchianism is a theology about divinity, and holds there is one God, the Father, and Jesus was a man, born of virgin birth, empowered by God's own divinity through the Holy Spirit, and raised to unity with God, but not a pre-existent distinct divine person. The chronology of the development of adoptionist and high Christologies remain a matter of debate within contemporary scholarship. Some scholars see adoptionism as the belief of the earliest followers of Jesus, based on the epistles of Paul and other early literature, though most scholars find Christ's pre-existence within the Pauline letters. However, adoptionist views sharply declined in prominence in the fourth and fifth centuries, as Church leaders condemned it as a heresy.

Gaston (2023) defines a distinction between adoptionism and dynamic monarchianism as different christologies, while being commonly conflated. Adoptionism refers to a theological position about the relationship between Jesus and the Father (i.e. that he was adopted by God), not the deity of Jesus, while Dynamic Monarchianism is a Christological position about the deity of Jesus. In Dynamic Monarchianism, "Dynamic" refers to being empowered by the Holy Spirit, while "Monarchianism" emphasizes a single deity (i.e. the Father). Gaston writes that Dynamic Monarchianism describes a Christology that was among the earliest Christologies, held by independent Theologians and maintained within mainstream Christianity until the fourth Century. Dynamic Monarchianism held that Jesus was a miraculously conceived man who, after his resurrection, ascended to heaven and to divine authority, as opposed to being an eternal divine Person who became human. Monarchianism is in contrast to Logos christologies of the second and third century, which distinguish the Logos as another divine person distinct from the Father. Monarchianism is categorized as Modalistic (where Father and Son are different designations for the same person) or Dynamic (where only the Father is God, and Jesus was empowered by his Spirit.)

== Definition ==
Adoptionism is one of two main forms of monarchianism (the other being modalism, which considers God to be one while working through the different "modes" or "manifestations" of God the Father, God the Son, and God the Holy Spirit, without limiting his modes or manifestations). Adoptionism denies the eternal pre-existence of Christ, and although it explicitly affirms his deity subsequent to events in his life, many classical trinitarians claim that the doctrine implicitly denies it by denying the constant hypostatic union of the eternal Logos to the human nature of Jesus.

Under adoptionism, Jesus is divine and has been since his adoption although he is not equal to the Father per "my Father is greater than I" and as such is a kind of subordinationism. (However, the quoted scripture can be orthodoxically interpreted as the fact that in the Trinity the Father is the source without origin, while the Son eternally receives the divinity from the Father.) Adoptionism is sometimes but not always related to a denial of the virgin birth of Jesus.

== History ==
=== Early Christianity ===
==== Adoptionism and high Christology ====
Bart Ehrman claims that the New Testament writings contain two different Christologies, namely a "low" or adoptionist Christology, and a "high" or "incarnation Christology". The "low Christology" or "adoptionist Christology" is the belief "that God exalted Jesus to be his Son by raising him from the dead", thereby raising him to "divine status". The other early Christology is "high Christology," which is "the view that Jesus was a pre-existent divine being who became a human, did the Father's will on earth, and then was taken back up into heaven whence he had originally come," and from where he appeared on earth. The chronology of the development of these early Christologies is a matter of debate within contemporary scholarship. (Note: Larry Hurtado, "The Origin of 'Divine Christology'?")

According to the "evolutionary model" or evolutionary theories proposed by Bousset, followed by Brown, the Christological understanding of Christ developed over time, from a low Christology to a high Christology, as witnessed in the Gospels. According to the evolutionary model, the earliest Christians believed that Jesus was a human who was exalted, and thus adopted as God's Son, when he was resurrected. Ehrman and Boyarin argue that adoptionist concepts can be found in the Gospel of Mark. (Note: Boyarin: "[W]e can still observe within the Gospel (especially in Mark, which has no miraculous birth story, and also even in Paul) the remnants of a version of Christology in which Jesus was born a man but became God at his baptism. This idea, later named the heresy of adoptionism (God adopting Jesus as his Son), was not quite stamped out until the Middle Ages.) This model argues that later beliefs shifted the exaltation to his baptism, birth, and subsequently to the idea of his eternal existence, as witnessed in the Gospel of John. Mark shifted the moment of when Jesus became the son to the baptism of Jesus, and later still Matthew and Luke shifted it to the moment of the divine conception, and finally John declared that Jesus had been with God from the beginning: "In the beginning was the Word". Daniel Johansson maintains that Mark's Jesus is "an exalted, but merely human figure", especially when read in the apparent context of Jewish beliefs, though The Cambridge Companion to Christology notes that many scholars now concede that the Synoptic gospels portray Jesus as divine.

One notable passage that may have been cited by early adoptionists was what exactly God said at Jesus's baptism; three different versions are recorded. One of them, found in the Codex Bezae version of Luke 3:22, is "You are my son; today I have begotten you." This seems to be quoted in Acts 13:32–33 as well (in all manuscripts, not just Bezae) and in Hebrews 5:5. Quotes from second and third century Christian writers almost always use this variant as well, with many fourth and fifth century writers continuing to use it, if occasionally with embarrassment; Augustine cites the line, for example, but clarifies God meant an eternal "today". Ehrman speculates that Orthodox scribes of the fourth and fifth century changed the passage in Luke to align with the version in Mark as a defense against adoptionists citing the passage in their favor.

Since the 1970s, these late datings for the development of a "high Christology" have been contested, and a majority of scholars argue that this "high Christology" existed already before the writings of Paul. (Note: Richard Bauckham argues that Paul was not so influential that he could have invented the central doctrine of Christianity. Before his active missionary work, there were already groups of Christians across the region. For example, a large group already existed in Rome even before Paul visited the place. The earliest centre of Christianity was the twelve apostles in Jerusalem. Paul himself consulted and sought guidance from the Christian leaders in Jerusalem (Galatians 2:1–2; Acts 9:26–28, 15:2). "What was common to the whole Christian movement derived from Jerusalem, not from Paul, and Paul himself derived the central message he preached from the Jerusalem apostles.") According to the "New Religionsgeschichtliche Schule", (Note: Larry Hurtado (10 July 2015), "Early High Christology": A "Paradigm Shift"? "New Perspective"?) or the Early High Christology Club, which includes Martin Hengel, Larry Hurtado, N. T. Wright, and Richard Bauckham, this "incarnation Christology" or "high Christology" did not evolve over a longer time, but was a "big bang" of ideas which were already present at the start of Christianity, and took further shape in the first few decades of the church, as witnessed in the writings of Paul. (Note: Loke (2017): "The last group of theories can be called 'Explosion Theories' (one might also call this 'the Big-Bang theory of Christology'!). This proposes that highest Christology was the view of the primitive Palestinian Christian community. The recognition of Jesus as truly divine was not a significant development from the views of the primitive Palestine community; rather, it 'exploded' right at the beginning of Christianity. The proponents of the Explosion view would say that the highest Christology of the later New Testament writings (e.g. Gospel of John) and the creedal formulations of the early church fathers, with their explicit affirmations of the pre-existence and ontological divinity of Christ, are not so much a development in essence but a development in understanding and explication of what was already there at the beginning of the Christian movement. As Bauckham (2008a, x) memorably puts it, 'The earliest Christology was already the highest Christology.' Many proponents of this group of theories have been labelled together as 'the New Religionsgeschichtliche Schule' (Hurtado 2003, 11), and they include such eminent scholars as Richard Bauckham, Larry Hurtado, N. T. Wright and the late Martin Hengel.") Most scholars find Christ's pre-existence present within the Pauline letters. Some 'Early High Christology' proponents scholars argue that this "high Christology" may go back to Jesus himself.

According to Ehrman, these two Christologies existed alongside each other, calling the "low Christology" an "adoptionist Christology, and "the "high Christology" an "incarnation Christology". Conversely, Michael Bird has argued that adoptionism did not first emerge until the 2nd century as a result of later theological debates and other socio-religious influences on the reading of certain biblical texts.

==== New Testamental epistles ====
Adoptionist theology may also be reflected in canonical epistles, the earliest of which pre-date the writing of the gospels. The letters of Paul the Apostle, for example, do not mention a virgin birth of Christ. Paul describes Jesus as "born of a woman, born under the law" and "as to his human nature was a descendant of David" in the Epistle to the Galatians and the Epistle to the Romans. Christian interpreters, however, take his statements in Philippians 2 to imply that Paul believed Jesus to have existed as equal to God before his incarnation.

==== Shepherd of Hermas ====
The 2nd-century work Shepherd of Hermas may also have taught that Jesus was a virtuous man filled with the Holy Spirit and adopted as the Son. (Note: "The Holy Pre-existent Spirit. Which created the whole creation, God made to dwell in flesh that he desired. This flesh, therefore, in which the Holy Spirit dwelt, was subject unto the Spirit, walking honorably in holiness and purity, without in any way defiling the Spirit. When then it had lived honorably in chastity, and had labored with the Spirit, and had cooperated with it in everything, behaving itself boldly and bravely, he chose it as a partner with the Holy Spirit; for the career of this flesh pleased [the Lord], seeing that, as possessing the Holy Spirit, it was not defiled upon the earth. He therefore took the son as adviser and the glorious angels also, that this flesh too, having served the Spirit unblamably, might have some place of sojourn, and might not seem to have lost the reward for its service; for all flesh, which is found undefiled and unspotted, wherein the Holy Spirit dwelt, shall receive a reward.") While the Shepherd of Hermas was popular and sometimes bound with the canonical scriptures, it did not retain canonical status, if it ever had it.

==== Theodotus of Byzantium ====
Theodotus of Byzantium (fl. late 2nd century), a Valentinian Gnostic, was the most prominent exponent of adoptionism. According to Hippolytus of Rome (Philosophumena, VII, xxiii) Theodotus taught that Jesus was a man born of a virgin, according to the Council of Jerusalem, that he lived like other men, and was most pious. At his baptism in the Jordan the "Christ" came down upon the man Jesus, in the likeness of a dove (Philosophumena, VII, xxiii), but Jesus was not himself God until after his resurrection.

Adoptionism was declared heresy at the end of the 3rd century and was rejected by the Synods of Antioch and the First Council of Nicaea, which defined the orthodox doctrine of the Trinity and identified the man Jesus with the eternally begotten Son or Word of God in the Nicene Creed. The belief was also declared heretical by Pope Victor I.

==== Ebionites ====
Adoptionism was also adhered to by the Jewish Christians known as Ebionites, who, according to Epiphanius in the 4th century, believed that Jesus was chosen on account of his sinless devotion to the will of God.

The Ebionites were a Jewish Christian movement that existed during the early centuries of the Christian Era. They show strong similarities with the earliest form of Jewish Christianity, and their specific theology may have been a "reaction to the law-free Gentile mission". They regarded Jesus as the Messiah while rejecting his divinity and his virgin birth, and insisted on the necessity of following Jewish law and rites. They used the Gospel of the Ebionites, one of the Jewish–Christian gospels; the Hebrew Book of Matthew starting at chapter 3; revered James the brother of Jesus (James the Just); and rejected Paul the Apostle as an apostate from the Law. Their name (Ancient Greek: Ἐβιωναῖοι, romanized: Ebionaioi, derived from Biblical Hebrew: אביונים, romanized: ebyonim, meaning 'the poor' or 'poor ones') suggests that they placed a special value on voluntary poverty.

Distinctive features of the Gospel of the Ebionites include the absence of the virgin birth and of the genealogy of Jesus; an Adoptionist Christology, (Note: Kloppenborg 1994, pp. 435–9; p. 435 – "This belief, known as "adoptionism", held that Jesus was not divine by nature or by birth, but that God chose him to become his son, i.e., adopted him.") in which Jesus is chosen to be God's Son at the time of his Baptism; the abolition of the Jewish sacrifices by Jesus; and an advocacy of vegetarianism. (Note: Vielhauer & Strecker 1991, pp. 166–71; p. 168 – "Jesus' task is to do away with the 'sacrifices'. In this saying (16.4–5), the hostility of the Ebionites against the Temple cult is documented.")

=== Spanish Adoptionism ===
Iberian Adoptionism was a theological position which was articulated in Umayyad and Christian-held regions of the Iberian Peninsula in the 8th and 9th centuries. The issue seems to have begun with the claim of archbishop Elipandus of Toledo that – in respect to his human nature – Christ was adoptive Son of God. Another leading advocate of this Christology was Felix of Urgel. In the Iberian peninsula, adoptionism was opposed by Beatus of Liebana, and in the Carolingian territories, the Adoptionist position was condemned by Pope Hadrian I, Alcuin of York, Agobard, and officially in Carolingian territory by the Council of Frankfurt (794).

Despite the shared name of "adoptionism" the Spanish Adoptionist Christology appears to have differed sharply from the adoptionism of early Christianity. Spanish advocates predicated the term adoptivus of Christ only in respect to his humanity; once the divine Son "emptied himself" of divinity and "took the form of a servant" (Philippians 2:7), Christ's human nature was "adopted" as divine.

Historically, many scholars have followed the Adoptionists' Carolingian opponents in labeling Spanish Adoptionism as a minor revival of "Nestorian" Christology. John C. Cavadini has challenged this notion by attempting to take the Spanish Christology in its own Spanish/North African context in his study, The Last Christology of the West: Adoptionism in Spain and Gaul, 785–820.

=== Scholastic Neo-adoptionism ===
A third wave was the revived form ("Neo-adoptionism") of Peter Abelard in the 12th century. Later, various modified and qualified Adoptionist tenets emerged from some theologians in the 14th century. Duns Scotus (1300) and Durandus of Saint-Pourçain (1320) admit the term filius adoptivus in a qualified sense. In more recent times the Jesuit Gabriel Vásquez, and the Lutheran divines Georgius Calixtus and Johann Ernst Immanuel Walch, have defended adoptionism as essentially orthodox.

=== Modern adoptionist groups ===
A form of adoptionism surfaced in Unitarianism during the 16th and 17th in Polish Brethren and the 18th century as denial of the virgin birth became increasingly common, led by the views of Joseph Priestley and others.

A similar form of adoptionism was expressed in the writings of James Strang, a Latter Day Saint leader who founded the Church of Jesus Christ of Latter Day Saints (Strangite) after the death of Joseph Smith in 1844. In his Book of the Law of the Lord, a purported work of ancient scripture found and translated by Strang, he offers an essay entitled "Note on the Sacrifice of Christ" in which he explains his unique (for Mormonism as a whole) doctrines on the subject. Jesus Christ, said Strang, was the natural-born son of Mary and Joseph, who was chosen from before all time to be the Savior of mankind, but who had to be born as an ordinary mortal of two human parents (rather than being begotten by the Father or the Holy Spirit) to be able to truly fulfill his Messianic role. Strang claimed that the earthly Christ was in essence "adopted" as God's son at birth, and fully revealed as such during the Transfiguration. After proving himself to God by living a perfectly sinless life, he was enabled to provide an acceptable sacrifice for the sins of men, prior to his resurrection and ascension.

The Christian Community, an esoteric Christian denomination informed by the teachings of Rudolf Steiner, assumes a high adoptionist Christology that treats Jesus and God the Son as separate beings until they are joined at baptism. "Steiner's Christology is discussed as a central element of his thought in Johannes Hemleben, Rudolf Steiner: A Documentary Biography, trans. Leo Twyman (East Grinstead, Sussex: Henry Goulden, 1975, pp. 96-100). From the perspective of orthodox Christianity, it may be said that Steiner combined a docetic understanding of Christ's nature with the Adoptionist heresy."

== See also ==
- Adoptivi
- Arianism
- Binitarianism

== Sources ==
Printed sources

- Bauckham, R. (2011), Jesus: A Very Short Introduction, Oxford University Press
- Bird, Michael F. (2017), Jesus the Eternal Son: Answering Adoptionist Christology, Wm. B. Eerdmans Publishing, ISBN 978-0-8028-7506-8
- Boyarin, Daniel (2012), The Jewish Gospels, New Press, ISBN 978-1-59558-711-4
- Brown, R.E. (1973), The Virginal Conception and Bodily Resurrection of Jesus, Paulist Press, ISBN 978-0-8091-1768-0
- Brown, R.E. (2008), Witherup, Ronald D. (ed.), Christ in the Gospels of the Liturgical Year, Paulist Press, ISBN 978-0-8146-3531-5
- Dunn, James D.G. (2006), Unity and Diversity in the New Testament (3rd ed.), scm press
- Ehrman, Bart (1996), The Orthodox Corruption of the Scripture, New York: Oxford University Press
- Ehrman, Bart D. (2003), Lost Christianities: The Battles for Scripture and the Faiths We Never Knew, Oxford University Press, ISBN 978-0-19-972712-4
- Ehrman, Bart (2014), How Jesus Became God. The Exaltation of a Jewish Preacher from Galilea, Harperone
- Fredriksen, Paula (2008), From Jesus to Christ: The Origins of the New Testament Images of Jesus, Yale University Press, ISBN 978-0-300-16410-7
- Grillmeier, Aloys; Bowden, John (1975), Christ in Christian Tradition: From the Apostolic Age to Chalcedon, Westminster John Knox Press, ISBN 978-0-664-22301-4
- Kloppenborg, John S. (1994) [1992]. "The Gospel of the Ebionites". In Miller, Robert J. (ed.). The Complete Gospels. Polebridge Press. pp. 435–40. ISBN 0-06-065587-9.
- Loke, Andrew Ter Ern (2017), The Origin of Divine Christology, vol. 169, Cambridge University Press, ISBN 978-1-108-19142-5
- Mack, Burton L. (1995), Who Wrote the New Testament? The Making of the Christian Myth
- Netland, Harold (2001), Encountering Religious Pluralism: The Challenge to Christian Faith & Mission, InterVarsity Press
- Philip Schaff History of the Christian Church, Volume IV, 1882.
- Talbert, Charles H. (2011), The Development of Christology during the First Hundred Years: and Other Essays on Early Christian Christology. Supplements to Novum Testamentum 140, Brill
- Vielhauer, Philipp; Strecker, Georg [in German] (1991). "Jewish–Christian gospels". In Schneemelcher, Wilhelm; Wilson, Robert McLachlan (eds.). New Testament Apocrypha: Gospels and Related Writings Volume 1 (2 ed.). John Knox Press. pp. 134–78. ISBN 0-664-22721-X. (6th German edition, translated by George Ogg)
- Witherington, Ben (2006), What Have They Done With Jesus?, San Francisco: Harper Collins
- Witherington, Ben (2009), "Christology – Paul's christology", in Hawthorne, Gerald F.; Martin, Ralph P.; Reid, Daniel G. (eds.), Dictionary of Paul and His Letters: A Compendium of Contemporary Biblical Scholarship, InterVarsity Press, ISBN 978-0-8308-7491-0

Web sources
