= Noetus =

Presbyter of the church of Asia Minor about AD 230

Noetus (Greek: Νοητός) was a presbyter of the church of Asia Minor about AD 230. He was a native of Smyrna, where (or perhaps in Ephesus) he became a prominent representative of the particular type of Christology now called modalistic monarchianism or patripassianism.

His views, which led to his excommunication by local presbyters, are known chiefly through the writings of Hippolytus, his contemporary at Rome, where he settled and had a large following. He accepted the fourth Gospel, but regarded its statements about the Logos as allegorical. His disciple Cleomenes held that God is both invisible and visible; as visible He is the Son.

The Catholic Encyclopedia notes: "It is true that it is easy to suppose Tertullian and Hippolytus to have misrepresented the opinions of their opponents".

== See also ==
- Sabellius
- Praxeas
