= Ousia =

Term in ancient Greek philosophy and Christian theology

Ousia (/ˈuːziə, ˈuːsiə, ˈuːʒə, ˈuːʃə/; Ancient Greek: οὐσία) is a philosophical and theological term, originally used in ancient Greek philosophy, then later in Christian theology. It was used by various ancient Greek philosophers, especially Aristotle, as a primary designation for philosophical concepts of essence or substance. It is analogous to concepts of being and the ontological in contemporary philosophy. In Christian theology, the concept of θεία ουσία (divine essence) is one of the most important doctrinal concepts, central to the development of trinitarian doctrine.

The Ancient Greek term θεία ουσία (theia ousia; divine essence) was translated in Latin as essentia or substantia, and hence in English as essence or substance.

== Etymology ==
The term οὐσία is an Ancient Greek noun, formed on the feminine present participle of the verb εἰμί, eimí, meaning "to be, I am", so similar grammatically to the English noun "being". There was no equivalent grammatical formation in Latin, and it was translated as essentia or substantia. Cicero coined essentia and the philosopher Seneca and rhetorician Quintilian used it as equivalent for οὐσία, while Apuleius rendered οὐσία both as essentia or substantia. In order to designate οὐσία, early Christian theologian Tertullian favored the use of substantia over essentia, while Augustine of Hippo and Boethius took the opposite stance, preferring the use of essentia as designation for οὐσία. Some of the most prominent Latin authors, like Hilary of Poitiers, noted that those variants were often being used with different meanings. Some modern authors also suggest that the Ancient Greek term οὐσία is properly translated as essentia (essence), while substantia has a wider spectrum of meanings.

From οὐσία (essence), philosophical and theological term οὐσιότης (essentiality) was also derived. It was used by Platonists, like Alcinous, as designation for one of the basic properties of divinity or godhead.

== Philosophy ==
Aristotle defined πρῶται οὐσίαι (protai ousiai; primary essences) in the Categories as that which is neither said of nor in any subject, e.g., "this human" in particular, or "this ox". The genera in biology and other natural kinds are substances in a secondary sense, as universals, formally defined by the essential qualities of the primary substances; i.e., the individual members of those kinds.

In Book IV of Metaphysics Aristotle explores the nature and attributes of being (ousia). Aristotle divides the things that there are, or "beings," into categories. Aristotle calls these substances and argues that there are many senses in which a thing may be said "to be" but it is related to one central point and is ambiguous.

Aristotle states that there are both primary and secondary substances. In Categories Aristotle argues that primary substances are ontologically based and if the primary substances did not exist then it would be impossible for other things to exist. The other things are regarded as either secondary substances or accidents, which are thus ontologically dependent on primary substances.

In Metaphysics, Aristotle states that everything which is healthy is related to health (primary substance) as in one sense because it preserves health and in the other because it is capable of it. Without the primary substance (health) we would not be able to have the secondary substances (anything related to health). While all the secondary substances are deemed "to be" it is in relation to the primary substance.

The question, what is being, is seeking an answer to something "that is." A contemporary example in rhetoric would be to look at a color. Using white as an example, when we define a color, we define it by association. Snow is white. Paper is white. A cow is white. But what is white? While we are saying things that are white, we are not defining what white is without qualification. Ousia is thus the answer to the question of "what is being" when the question is without qualification. The unqualified answer of what is white is the ousia of white.

Much later, Martin Heidegger said that the original meaning of the word ousia was lost in its translation to the Latin, and, subsequently, in its translation to modern languages. For him, ousia means Being, not substance, that is, not some thing or some being that "stood" (-stance) "under" (sub-). Moreover, he also used the binomial parousia–apousia, denoting presence–absence, and hypostasis denoting existence.

== Christian theology ==
The concept of θεία οὐσία (theia ousia; divine essence) is one of the most important concepts in Christian theology. It was developed gradually by Early Church Fathers during the first centuries of Christian History. Central debates over the doctrinal use and meaning of οὐσία were held during the 4th century, and also continued later, some of them lasting up to the present day.

=== New Testament ===
The word ousia is used in the New Testament only in relation to the substance in the sense of goods, twice in the parable of the Prodigal Son where the son asked his father to divide to him his inheritance, and then wasted it on riotous living.

An apparently related word, epiousios (affixing the prefix epi- to the word), is used in the Lord's Prayer, but nowhere else in the scriptures. Elsewhere, it was believed to be present in one papyrus (a list of expenses) among expenses for chick-peas, straw, etc., and for material. In 1998, according to a xerographic copy of a papyrus found in the Yale Papyrus Collection (from the Beinecke Rare Book and Manuscript Library) inventory 19 (a.k.a. P.C.+YBR inv 19), it was suggested that the document had been transcribed differently from other early manuscripts and that the actual word used in that particular papyrus was elaiou, meaning "oil".

=== Early Christianity ===
Origen (d. 251) used ousia in defining God as one genus of ousia, while being three, distinct species of hypostasis: the Father, the Son, and the Holy Spirit. The Synods of Antioch condemned the word homoousios (same essence) because it originated in pagan Greek philosophy. John Chapman's Catholic Encyclopedia entry for Paul of Samosata states:

It must be regarded as certain that the council, which condemned Paul, rejected the term homoousios; but, naturally, only in a false sense, used by Paul; not, it seems, because he meant by it a unity of Hypostasis in the Trinity (so St. Hilary), but because he intended, by it, a common essence, out of which both Father and Son proceeded, or which it divided between them – so St. Basil and St. Athanasius; but the question is not clear. The objectors to the Nicene doctrine in the fourth century made copious use of this disapproval of the Nicene word by a famous council.

In 325, the First Council of Nicaea condemned Arianism and formulated the Nicene Creed, which stated that in the Godhead the Son was Homoousios (same in essence) of the Father. However, controversy did not stop and many Eastern clerics rejected the term because of its earlier condemnation in the usage of Paul of Samosata. Subsequent Emperors Constantius II (reigned 337–361) and Valens (reigned 364–378) supported Arianism and theologians came up with alternative wordings like Homoios (similar), homoiousios (similar in essence), or Anomoios (unsimilar). While the Homoios achieved the support of several councils and the Emperors, those of an opposing view were suppressed. The adherents of the Homoiousios eventually joined forces with the (mostly Western) adherents of the Homoousios and accepted the formulation of the Nicene Creed.

The generally agreed-upon meaning of ousia in Eastern Christianity is "all that subsists by itself and which has not its being in another" – in contrast to hypostasis, which is used to mean "reality" or "existence". John Damascene gives the following definition of the conceptual value of the two terms in his Dialectic: Ousia is a thing that exists by itself, and which has need of nothing else for its consistency. Again, ousia is all that subsists by itself and which has not its being in another.

== See also ==
- Atman
- Atzmus
- Consubstantial
- Duns Scotus
- Essence–energies distinction
- Haecceity
- Hypokeimenon
- Metousiosis
- Noumenon
- Quiddity

== Bibliography ==
- Athanasopoulos, Constantinos; Schneider, Christoph, eds. (2013). Divine Essence and Divine Energies: Ecumenical Reflections on the Presence of God. Cambridge, UK: James Clarke & Co. ISBN 978-0227900086.
- Bracht, Katharina (2009). "God and Methodius". God in Early Christian Thought. Leiden; Boston: Brill. pp. 105–122. ISBN 978-9004174122.
- Brentano, Franz (1976) [1862]. On the Several Senses of Being in Aristotle. Berkeley: University of California Press.
- Brown, Stephen F. (1996). "Theology and Philosophy". Medieval Latin: An Introduction and Bibliographical Guide. Washington, D.C.: CUA Press. pp. 267–287. ISBN 978-0813208428.
- Davis, Leo Donald (1983). The First Seven Ecumenical Councils (325–787): Their History and Theology. Liturgical Press. ISBN 0814656161.)
- Heidegger, Martin (1996). Being and Time: A Translation of Sein und Zeit. Albany: State University of New York Press. ISBN 978-0791426777.
- Lossky, Vladimir (1976) [1957]. The Mystical Theology of the Eastern Church. Crestwood: St Vladimir's Seminary Press. ISBN 978-0913836316.
- Loux, Michael J. (2008) [1991]. Primary Ousia: An Essay on Aristotle's Metaphysics Z and H. Ithaca & London: Cornell University Press. ISBN 978-0801474880.
- Motte, André; Somville, Pierre, eds. (2008). Ousia dans la philosophie grecque des origines à Aristote. Louvain-la-Neuve: Peeters. ISBN 978-9042919839.
- Owens, Joseph (1951). The Doctrine of Being in the Aristotelian Metaphysics: A Study in the Greek Background of Mediaeval Thought. Toronto: Pontifical Institute of Mediaeval Studies.
- Pásztori-Kupán, István (2006). Theodoret of Cyrus. London & New York: Routledge. ISBN 978-1134391769.
- Weedman, Mark (2007). The Trinitarian Theology of Hilary of Poitiers. Leiden; Boston: Brill. ISBN 978-9004162242.
