= Pope Callixtus I =

Head of the Catholic Church from c. 218 to c. 223

Pope Saint Callixtus I
- Bishop of Rome
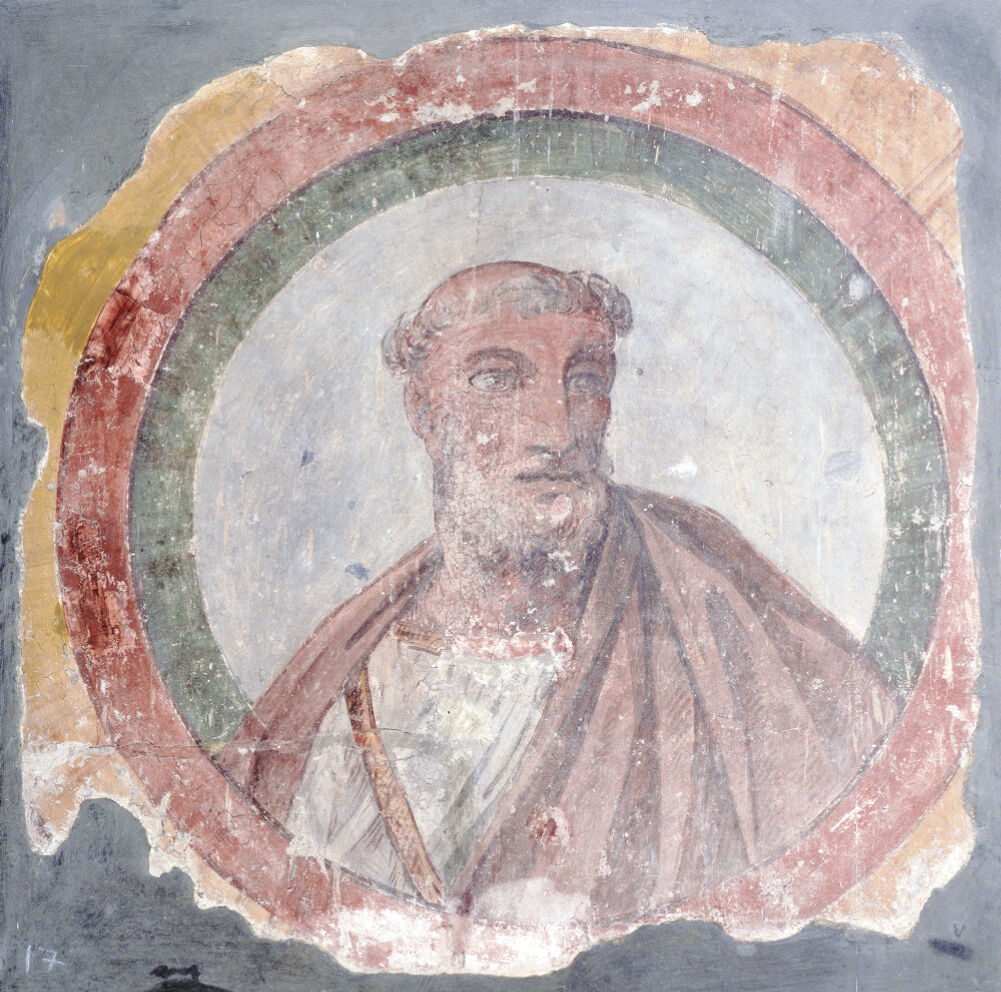
- Fresco originally located in the Basilica of Saint Paul Outside the Walls, c. 450
- Church: Catholic Church
- Papacy began: c. 218
- Papacy ended: c. 222
- Predecessor: Zephyrinus
- Successor: Urban I

Orders
- Ordination: 199, as deacon by Zephyrinus

Personal details
- Born: Rome, Italy, Roman Empire
- Died: 222 Rome, Italy, Roman Empire

Sainthood
- Feast day: 14 October
- Patronage: Cemetery workers

Pope Callixtus I (Greek: Κάλλιστος), also called Callistus I, was the bishop of Rome (according to Sextus Julius Africanus) from c. 218 to his death c. 222 or 223. He lived during the reigns of the Roman emperors Elagabalus and Alexander Severus. Eusebius and the Liberian catalogue list his episcopate as having lasted five years (217–222). In 217, when Callixtus followed Zephyrinus as Bishop of Rome, he started to admit into the Church converts from sects or schisms. He was killed for being Christian and is venerated as a saint and martyr by the Catholic Church (the patron saint of cemetery workers).

== Life ==
Callixtus I's contemporaries and enemies, Tertullian and Hippolytus of Rome, the author of Philosophumena, relate that Callixtus, as a young slave from Rome, was put in charge of collected funds by his master Carpophorus, funds which were given as alms by other Christians for the care of widows and orphans; Callixtus lost the funds and fled from the city, but was caught near Portus. According to the tale, Callixtus jumped overboard to avoid capture but was rescued and taken back to his master. He was released at the request of the creditors, who hoped he might be able to recover some of the money, but was rearrested for fighting in a synagogue when he tried to borrow money or collect debts from some Jews.

Philosophumena claims that, denounced as a Christian, Callixtus was sentenced to work in the mines of Sardinia. He was released with other Christians at the request of Hyacinthus, a eunuch presbyter, who represented Marcia, the favourite mistress of Emperor Commodus. At this time his health was so weakened that his fellow Christians sent him to Antium to recuperate and he was given a pension by Pope Victor I.

In 199, Callixtus was ordained a deacon by Pope Zephyrinus and appointed superintendent of the Christian cemetery on the Appian Way. That place, which is to this day called the Catacombs of St. Callixtus, became the burial-ground of many popes and was the first land property owned by the Church. Emperor Julian the Apostate, writing to a pagan priest, said:

Christians have gained most popularity because of their charity to strangers and because of their care for the burial of their dead.

In the third century, nine bishops of Rome were interred in the Catacomb of Callixtus, in the part now called the Capella dei Papi. These catacombs were rediscovered by the archaeologist Giovanni Battista de Rossi in 1849.

In 217, when Callixtus followed Zephyrinus as Bishop of Rome, he started to admit into the Church converts from sects or schisms who had not done penance. He fought with success the heretics, and established the practice of absolution of all sins, including adultery and murder. Hippolytus found Callixtus's policy of extending forgiveness of sins to cover sexual transgressions shockingly lax and denounced him for allowing believers to regularize liaisons with their own slaves by recognizing them as valid marriages. As a consequence also of doctrinal differences, Hippolytus was elected as a rival bishop of Rome, the first antipope.

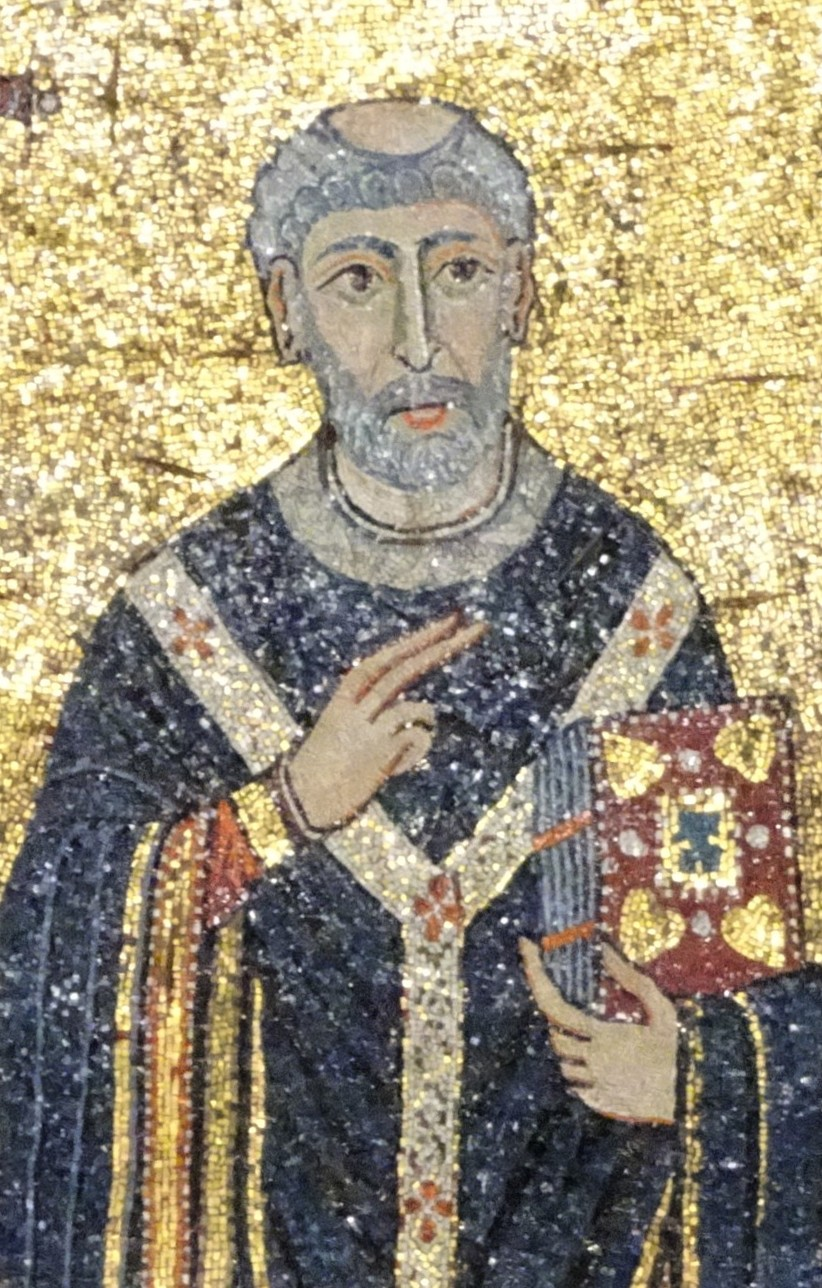
Excerpt from a mosaic in the apse of Santa Maria in Trastevere in Rome, c. 12th century

The Basilica di Santa Maria in Trastevere was a titulus of which Callixtus was the patron. In an apocryphal anecdote in the collection of imperial biographies called the Augustan History, the spot on which he had built an oratory was claimed by tavern keepers, but Alexander Severus decided that the worship of any god was better than a tavern, hence the structure's name. The 4th-century basilica of Ss Callixti et Iuliani was rebuilt in the 12th century by Pope Innocent II and rededicated to the Blessed Virgin Mary. The 8th-century Chiesa di San Callisto is close by, with its beginnings apparently as a shrine on the site of his martyrdom, which is attested in the 4th-century Depositio martyrum and so is likely to be historical.

== Death ==
It is possible that Callixtus was martyred around 222 or 223, perhaps during a popular uprising, perhaps by being thrown down a well. According to the apocryphal Acts of Saint Callixtus, Asterius, a priest of Rome, recovered the body of Callixtus after it had been tossed into a well and buried Callixtus' body at night. Asterius was arrested for this action by the prefect Alexander and then killed by being thrown off a bridge into the Tiber River.

Callixtus was buried in the cemetery of Calepodius on the Aurelian Way and his anniversary is given by the 4th-century Depositio Martirum and by subsequent martyrologies on 14 October. The Catholic Church celebrates his optional memorial on 14 October. His relics were transferred in the 9th century to Santa Maria in Trastevere.

== See also ==
- List of Catholic saints
- List of popes
- Pope Saint Callixtus I, patron saint archive

== Citations ==
Titles of the Great Christian Church
| Preceded by Zephyrinus | Bishop of Rome; 217–222 | Succeeded by Urban I |
