= Godhead in Christianity =

Essence or substance of God

Godhead (or godhood) refers to the essence or substance (ousia) of God in Christianity — God the Father, Son, and Holy Spirit.

== Appearance in English Bibles ==
John Wycliffe introduced the term godhede into English Bible versions in two places, and, though somewhat archaic, the term survives in modern English because of its use in three places of the Tyndale New Testament (1525), the Geneva Bible (1560/1599), and King James Version (1611). In that translation, the word was used to translate three different Koine Greek words:

Verse	Greek	Romanization	Type	Translation	Vulgate 405	Wycliffe 1395	Tyndale 1525	KJV 1611	ESV 2001
Acts 17:29	θεῖον	theion	adjective	"divine, godly"	divinum	that godli thing	godhed	Godhead	the divine being
Romans 1:20	θειότης	theiotēs	noun	"divinity, divine nature"	divinitas	godhed	godhed	Godhead	divine nature
Colossians 2:9	θεότης	theotēs	noun	"deity"	divinitas	the Godhed	the godheed	Godhead	deity

== See also ==
- God in Christianity
- Godhead in Judaism
- Trinity
