= Classical trinitarianism =

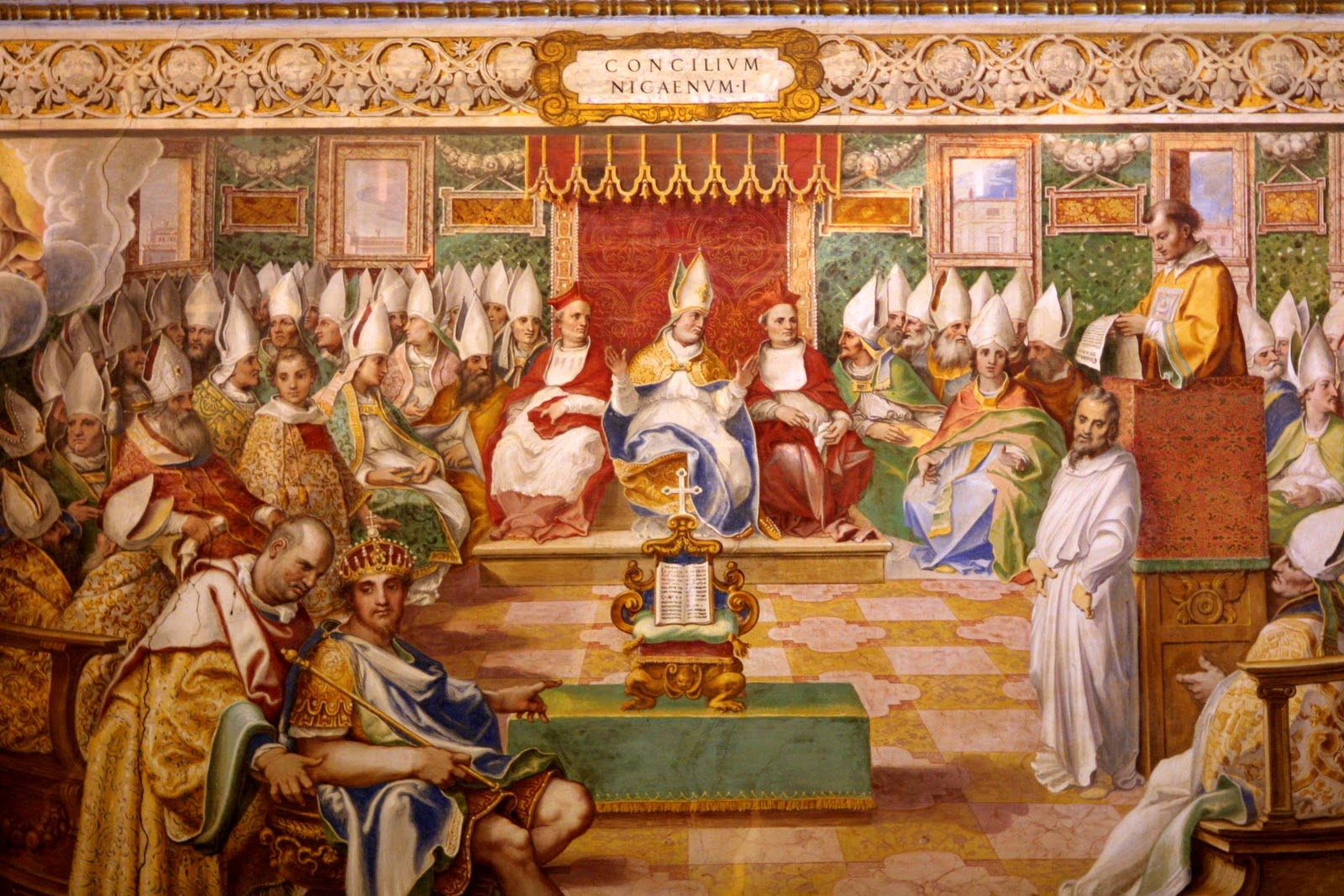
A depiction of the first council of Nicaea

Classical trinitarianism is a term which has been used to refer to the model of the trinity formulated in early Christian creeds and classical theologians, such as Augustine and Thomas Aquinas. This form of trinitarianism is often contrasted to what is called "social trinitarianism", and thus is sometimes pejoratively called "anti-social trinitarianism".

== History ==
During the Arian controversy, the Council of Nicaea was called to establish the doctrine of the trinity. In this council, it was established that the Son is eternally begotten from the Father, but not created by the Father. This was in contradiction to the view of Arius, who believed the Son was begotten as a creature as a product of the Father's will, and thus not being of the same essence as the Father. However, the Nicene writers argued that eternal generation does not undermine the Son as coeternal.

== Doctrine ==
=== Personhood ===
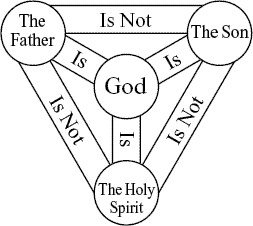
Shield of the trinity

Classical trinitarianism has often been said to sometimes struggle in assigning content or traits to each of the persons of the trinity. Trinitarian theologians have struggled with needing an answer to the question on what distinguishes the Father, Son and Holy Spirit properly for each other, and if the presence of too many properties would diminish the unity of God. In this framework, a "person" is defined as an existing subject distinct from others. However, this definition alone does not fully explain the uniqueness of each Person, and overemphasizing their distinctions could be argued to lead to tritheism. To address this challenge, classical Trinitarians have put forward three key principles: (1) the consubstantiality of the three persons, affirming that no one person is more divine than the others; (2) the Son’s begottenness from the Father; and (3) the Holy Spirit’s procession from the Father (and the Son). According to this view, the persons of the Trinity are distinguished solely by relations of procession—unique relational properties that are not shared among all three. Thus, in this view the doctrine of eternal generation of the Son is an important doctrine, which expresses the relationship between the Father and Son, while the eternal procession of the Holy Spirit expresses the eternal relation between the Father and the Holy Spirit. According to the Independent Baptist theologian Thomas Ross, to the Father is ascribed the property of being unbegotten (agennesia), to the Son the property of being begotten (gennesia) and to the Holy Spirit the property of being proceeding (ekporeusis).

Thus, the way God is one differs from the way he is three. When it is said that God is one, it is referred to his essence or being, while when it is said that God is three, it is referred to the manner in which the essence subsists (or exists) in each person.

=== Economic trinity ===
Within the classical trinitarian view, there is only one ad extra divine work. However, at the same time one can make distinctions in the works of God according to the persons of God, thus there are three modes of working in the one divine work, the order of the works of God in history reflecting the eternal relations of begetting and procession. Thus, in every work of the trinity, the Father is thought of as being first, then the Son and finally the Holy Spirit. Rolland McCune taught that the distinctions of the persons of the Trinity within the essence of God, as well as the order of their works, are explained by the eternal generation of the Son and the eternal procession of the Holy Spirit from the Father and Son.

=== Comparison to Social Trinitarianism ===
The social model of the trinity differs from the classical model by viewing the persons of the trinity as three centers of consciousness and will, the distinctions between the persons not being defined primarily by eternal relations of origin and by viewing the trinity as a society or a community.

Attributing will to nature instead of as a hypostatic property also logically leads to dyothelitism, the belief that Jesus had two wills. However social trinitarians often uphold monothelitism, which is the belief that Jesus had only one will. William Lane Craig (a social trinitarian) has argued that the non-social view of the trinity is only "thinly veiled Unitarianism".
