= Eastern Orthodoxy =

Major branch of Christianity

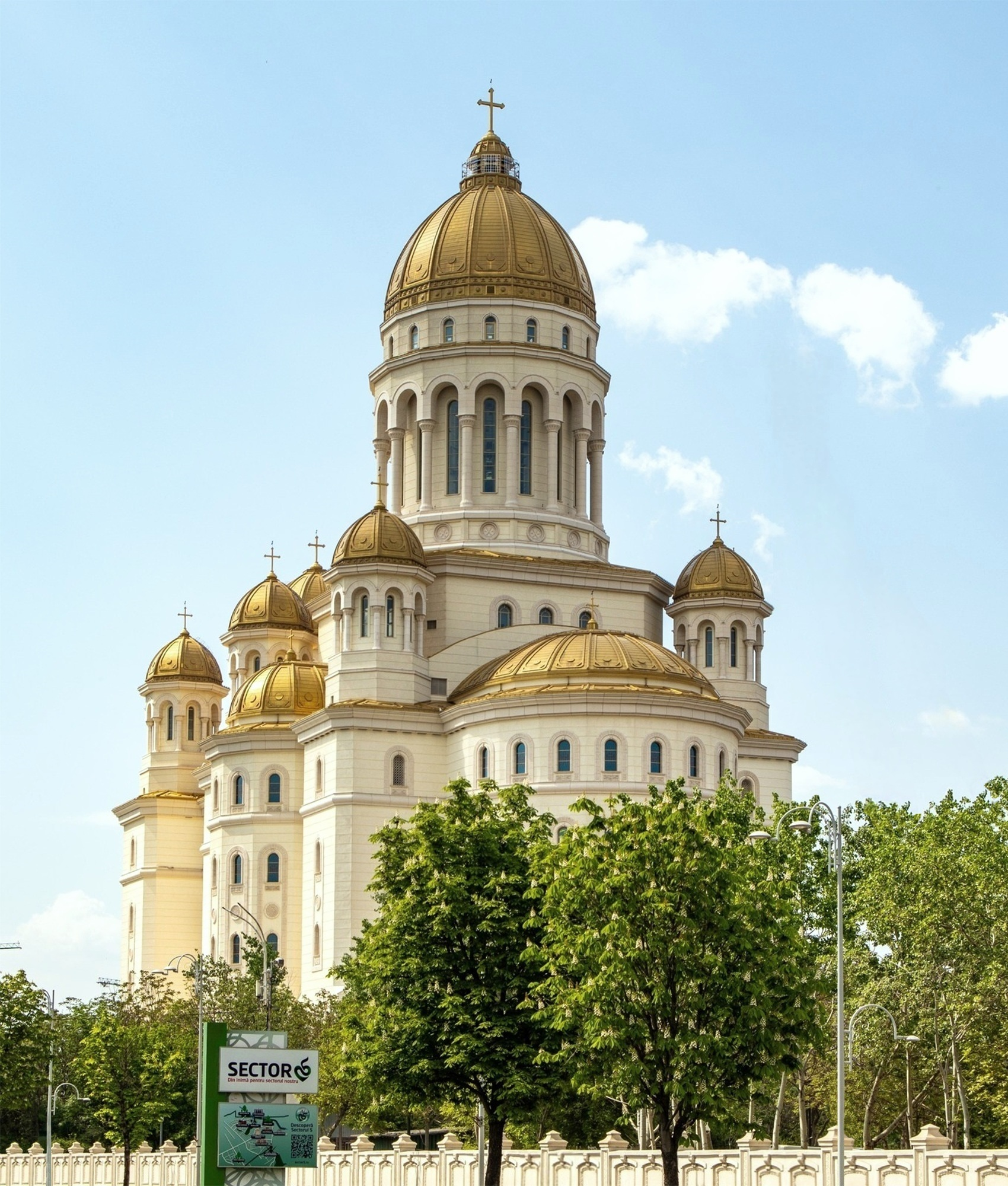
The People's Salvation Cathedral in Bucharest is the tallest and largest Eastern Orthodox church (by volume) in the world

Eastern Orthodoxy, otherwise known as Eastern Orthodox Christianity or Byzantine Christianity, is one of the three main branches of Chalcedonian Christianity, alongside Catholicism and certain forms of Protestantism. Like the Pentarchy of the first millennium, the mainstream (or "canonical") Eastern Orthodox Church is organised into autocephalous churches independent from each other. There are 17 mainstream autocephalous churches in Eastern Orthodoxy, plus other autocephalous churches unrecognized by the mainstream ones. Autocephalous churches choose their own primate. Autocephalous churches can have jurisdiction (authority) over other churches, some of which have the status of "autonomous" which means they have more autonomy than simple eparchies.

Many of these jurisdictions correspond to the territories of one or more modern states; the Patriarchate of Moscow, for example, corresponds to Russia and some of the other post-Soviet states. They can also include metropolises, bishoprics, parishes, monasteries, or outlying metochia corresponding to diasporas that can also be located outside the country where the primate resides (e.g., the case of the Ecumenical Patriarchate of Constantinople whose canonical territory is located partly in northern Greece and the east); sometimes they overlap (the case of Moldova where the jurisdictions of the patriarchs of Bucharest and of Moscow overlap).

The spread of Eastern Orthodoxy began in the eastern area of the Mediterranean Basin within Byzantine Greek culture. Its communities share an understanding, teaching and offices of great similarity, with a strong sense of seeing each other as parts of one church. Adherents of Eastern Orthodox Christianity punctuate their year according to the liturgical calendar of their church. Mainstream Eastern Orthodoxy holds that the Holy Spirit proceeds only from the Father and rejects the Filioque clause ("and the Son") added to the Nicene Creed by the Latin Church, on the grounds that no council was called for the addition.

== Theology ==
=== Trinity ===
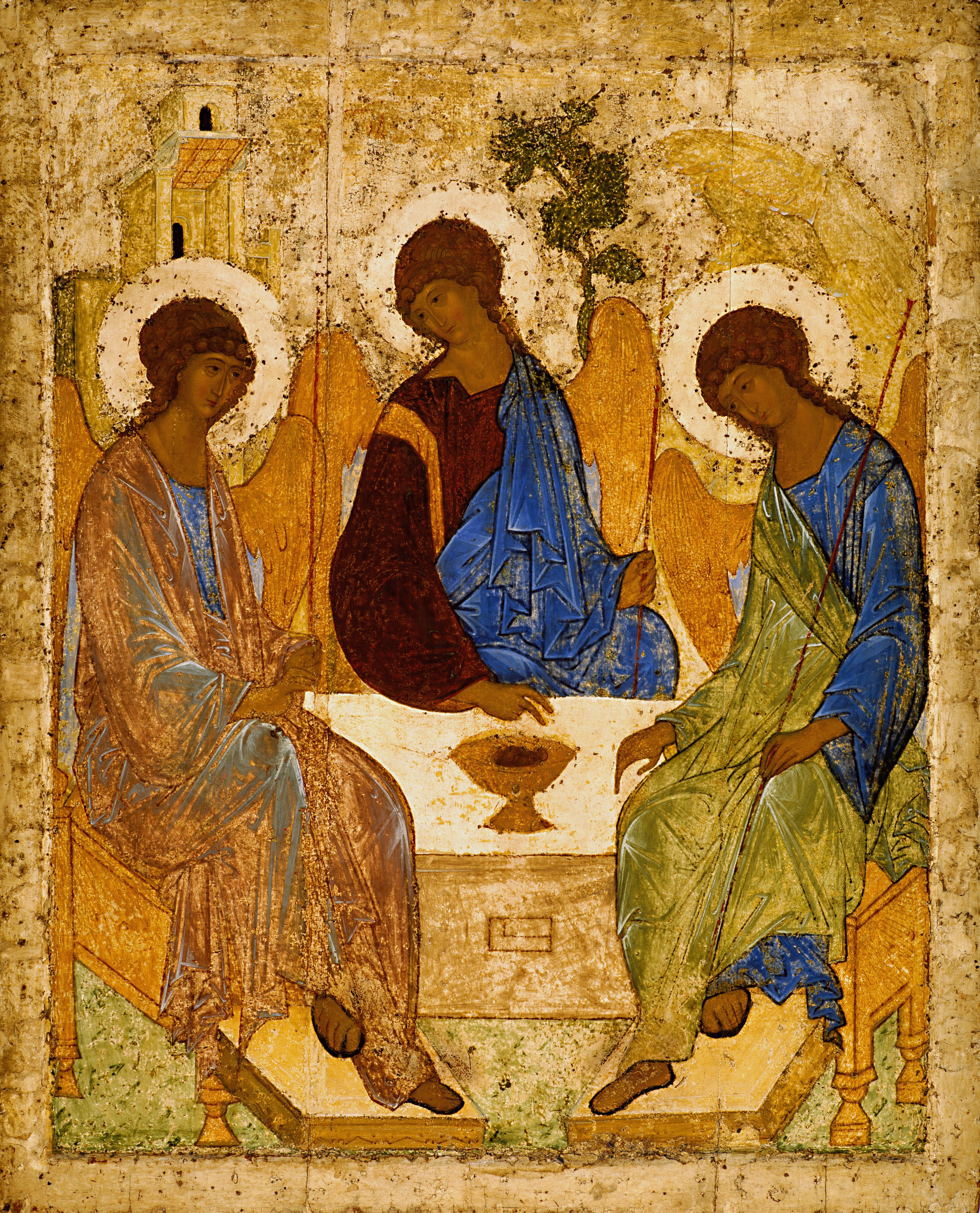
The Trinity by Russian icon painter Andrei Rublev, early 15th century

Eastern Orthodox Christians believe in the Trinity: three distinct, divine persons (hypostases), without overlap or modality among them, who each fully share in one divine essence (οὐσία, ousia)—uncreated, immaterial, and eternal. These three persons are typically distinguished by their relation to each other. God the Father is eternal, neither begotten nor proceeding from any other being. God the Son is eternal and begotten of the Father, and the Holy Spirit is eternal and proceeds from the Father. Eastern Orthodox doctrine regarding the Trinity is summarized in the Greek edition of the Nicene Creed, which notably does not affirm the Filioque.

Eastern Orthodox Christians believe in a monotheistic conception of God (i.e., that there is only one God) who is both transcendent (i.e., wholly independent of, and removed from, the material universe) and immanent (i.e., involved in the material universe). In discussing God's relationship to his creation, Eastern Orthodox theology distinguishes between God's eternal essence, which is totally transcendent, and his uncreated energies, which are how he reaches humanity. The God who is transcendent and the God who touches humankind are one and the same. That is, these energies are not something that proceed from God or that God produces, but rather they are God himself: distinct, yet inseparable from God's inner being. This view is often called Palamism.

In understanding the Trinity as "one God in three persons", "three persons" is not to be emphasized more than "one God", and vice versa. While the three persons are distinct, they are united in one divine essence, and their oneness is expressed in community and action so completely that they cannot be considered separately. For example, their salvation of humankind is an activity engaged in common: "Christ became man by the good will of the Father and by the cooperation of the Holy Spirit. Christ sends the Holy Spirit who proceeds from the Father, and the Holy Spirit forms Christ in our hearts, and thus God the Father is glorified." Their "communion of essence" is "indivisible". Trinitarian terminology—e.g., essence, hypostasis, etc.—is used "philosophically", "to answer the ideas of the heretics", and "to place the terms where they separate error and truth".

=== Sin, salvation, and the incarnation ===
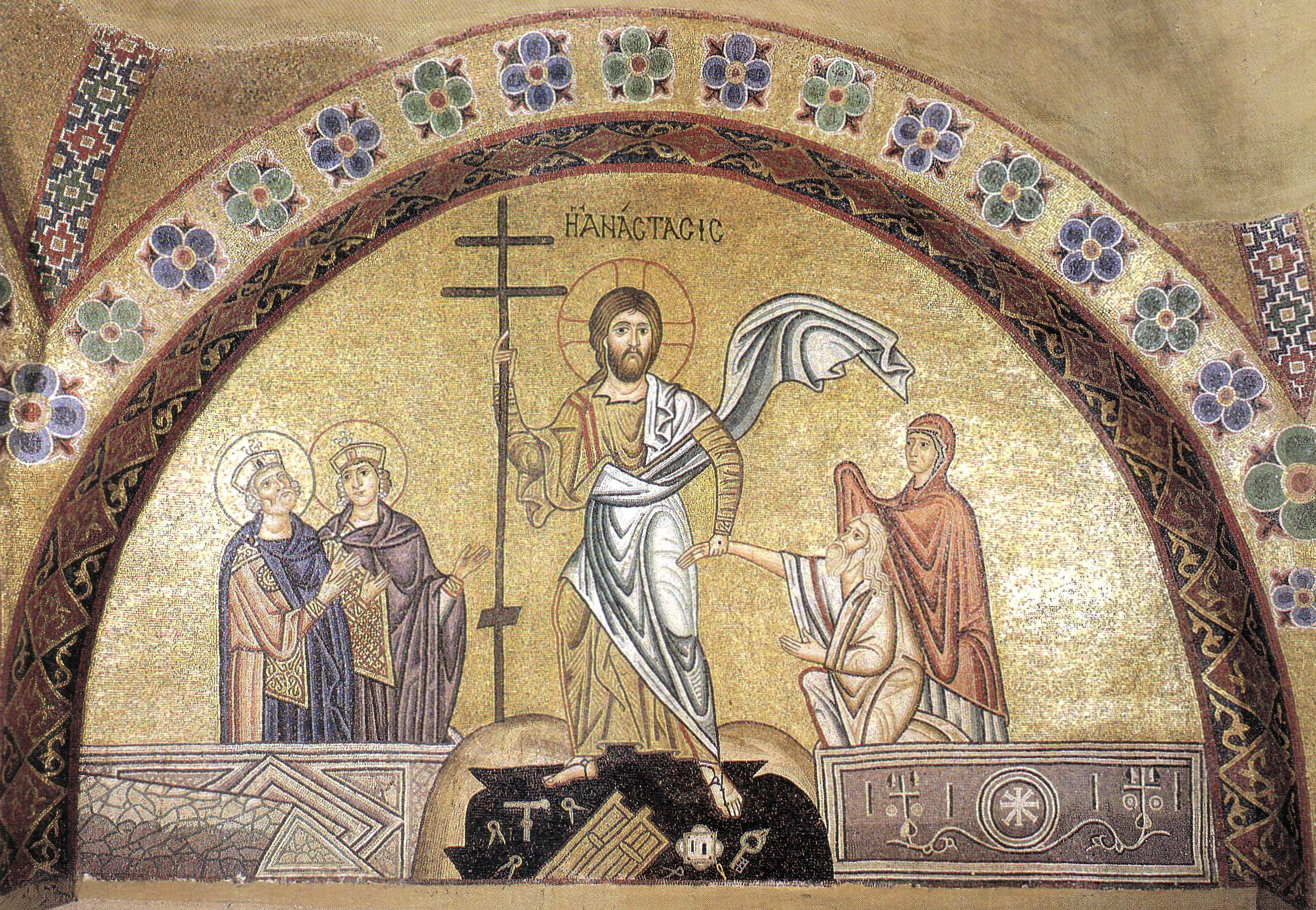
Harrowing of Hell, mosaic in the Monastery of Osios Loukas, 11th century.

When Eastern Orthodox Christians refer to "fallen nature", they do not mean that human nature has become evil in itself. Human nature is still formed in the image of God: humans are still God's creation, and God has never created anything evil, but humankind's fallen nature remains open to evil intents and actions. It is sometimes said among the Eastern Orthodox that humans are "inclined to sin" (that is, people find some sinful things attractive). It is the nature of temptation to make sinful things seem more attractive, and it is the fallen nature of humans that seeks or succumbs to the attraction. Eastern Orthodox Christians reject the Augustinian position that the descendants of Adam and Eve are actually guilty of the original sin of their ancestors.

=== Resurrection and return of Jesus ===
Eastern Orthodoxy considers the most important event in human history to be the life and resurrection of Jesus, as recounted in the New Testament, and Eastern Orthodox churches hold that Jesus will return to Earth in a future event known as the Second Coming. Eastern Orthodoxy believes Jesus was killed on a cross under the authority of Pontius Pilate, entombed, and brought back to life 3 days later. This belief is core to Eastern Orthodoxy and is how sin is understood to be fully absolved. Eastern Orthodoxy believes that Jesus continued to walk the Earth for 40 days post-resurrection, as described in the New Testament, before ascending into Heaven.

=== Christian life ===
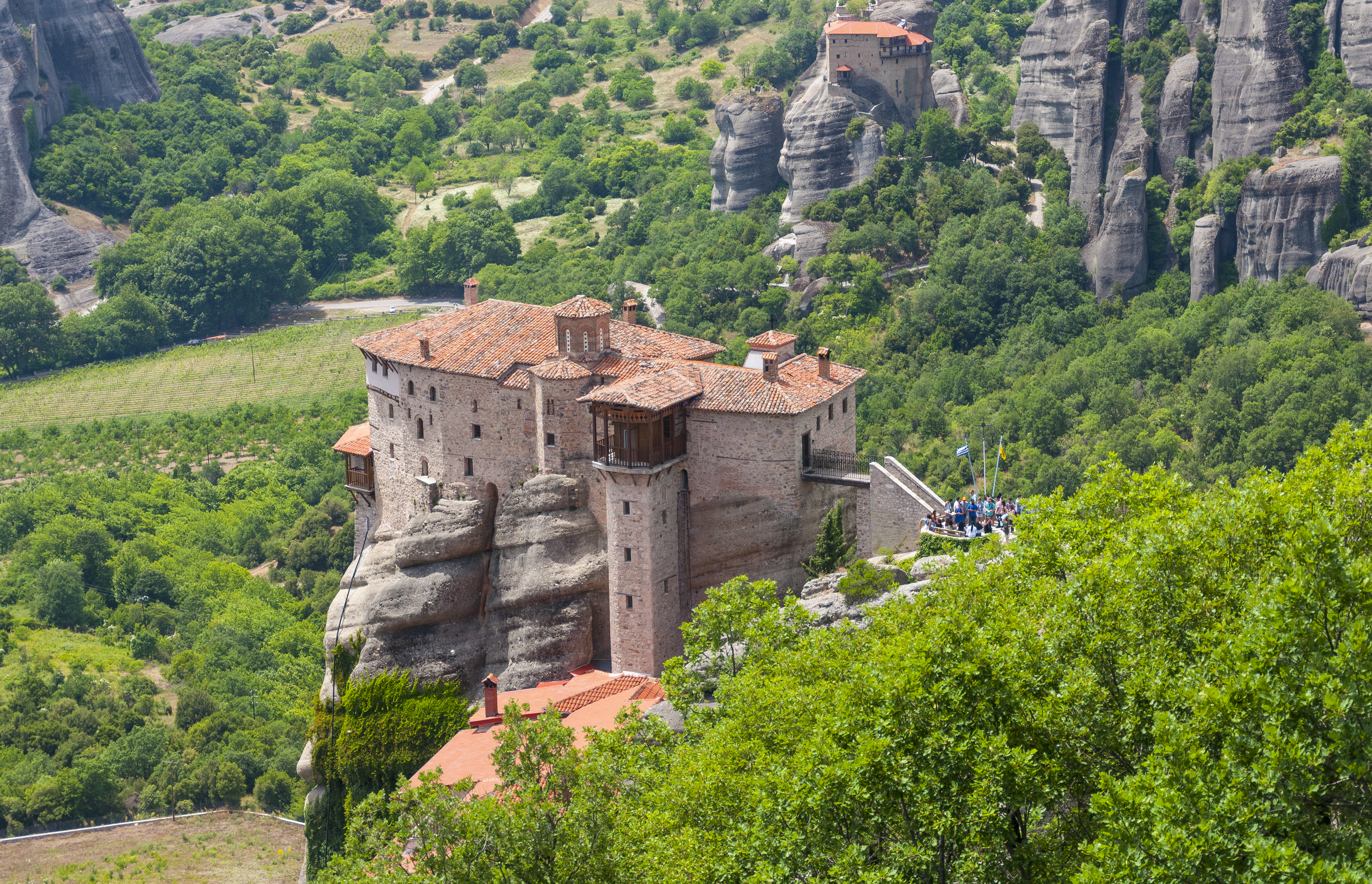
Monastery of Rousanou in Greece.

Church teaching is that Eastern Orthodox Christians, through baptism, enter a new life of salvation through repentance, the purpose of which is to share in the life of God through the work of the Holy Spirit. The Eastern Orthodox Christian life is a spiritual pilgrimage in which each person, through imitation of Christ and hesychasm, cultivates the practice of unceasing prayer. Each life occurs within the life of the church as a member of the body of Christ. It is then through the fire of God's love in the action of the Holy Spirit that each member becomes more holy, more wholly unified with God the Son, starting in this life and continuing in the next. The church teaches that everyone, being born in God's image, is called to theosis: fulfillment of the image in likeness to God. God, the creator, having divinity by nature, offers each person participation in divinity by cooperatively accepting his gift of grace. This is not to be mistaken as participating in the essence of God but rather participating in his energies. This would mean that we do not become "divine"; we still remain human but become "gods" by grace, or in other words "icons of the living God" as many call it.

The Eastern Orthodox Church, in understanding itself to be the Body of Christ, and similarly in understanding the Christian life to lead to the unification in Christ of all members of his body, views the church as embracing all Christ's members, those now living on earth, and also all those through the ages who have passed on to the heavenly life. The church includes the Christian saints from all times, and also Hebrew judges and prophets and righteous Jews, Adam and Eve, even the angels and heavenly hosts. In Eastern Orthodox services, the earthly members, together with the heavenly members, worship God as one community in Christ, in a union that transcends time and space and joins heaven to earth. This unity of the Church is sometimes called the communion of the saints.

=== Virgin Mary and other saints ===
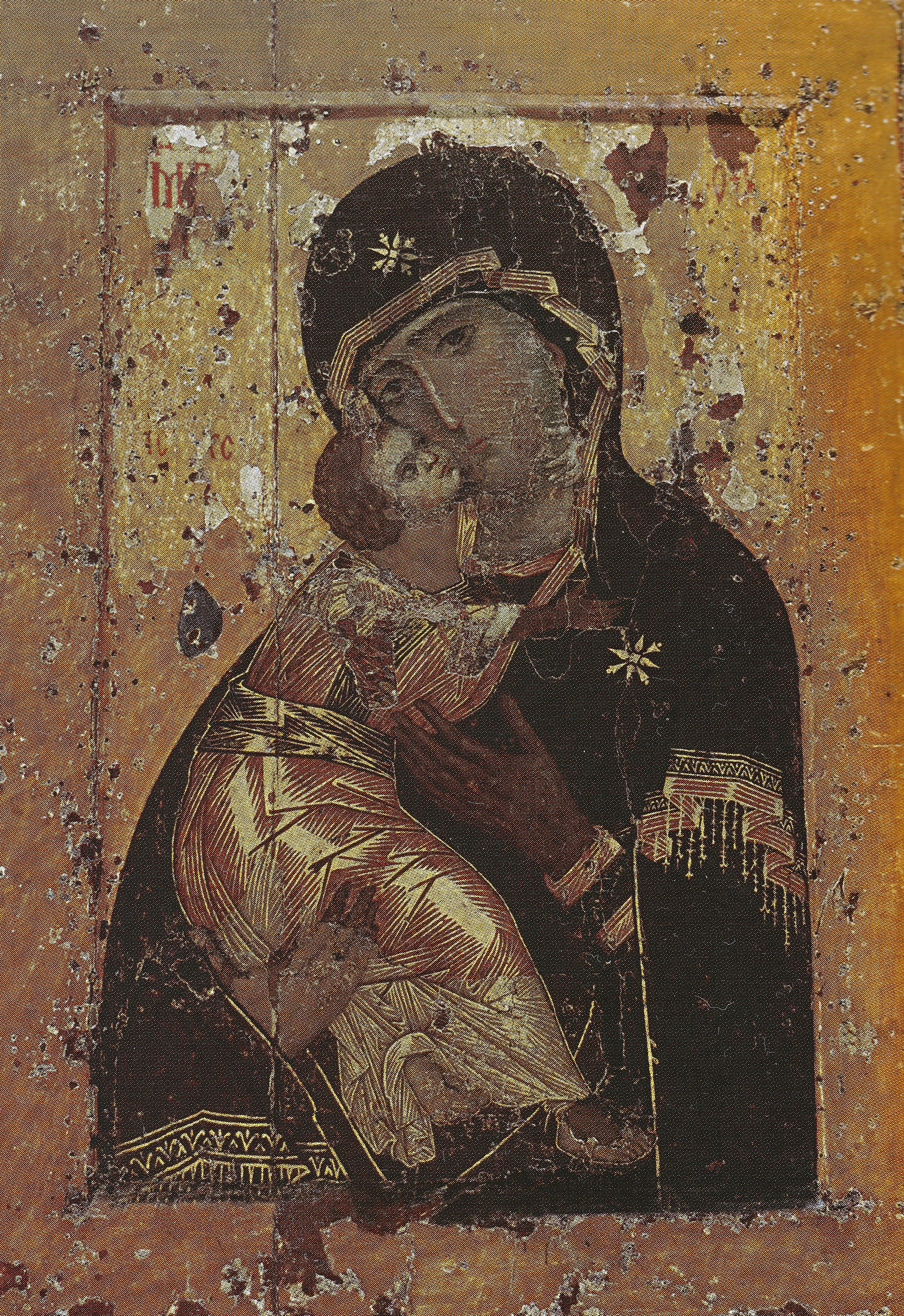
The Theotokos of Vladimir, one of the most venerated Orthodox Christian icons of the Virgin Mary

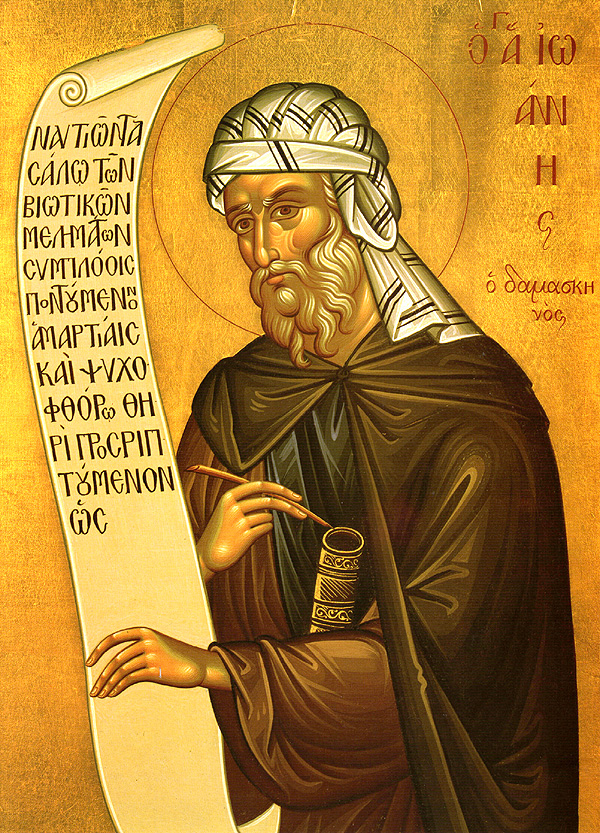
John of Damascus

Pre-eminent among the saints is the Virgin Mary (commonly referred to as Theotokos or Bogorodica: "Mother of God"). In Eastern Orthodox theology, the Mother of God is the fulfillment of the Old Testament archetypes revealed in the Ark of the Covenant (because she carried the New Covenant in the person of Christ) and the burning bush that appeared before Moses (symbolizing the Mother of God's carrying of God without being consumed).

The Eastern Orthodox believe that Christ, from the moment of his conception, was both fully God and fully human. Mary is thus called the Theotokos or Bogorodica as an affirmation of the divinity of the one to whom she gave birth. It is also believed that her virginity was not compromised in conceiving God-incarnate, that she was not harmed, and that she remained forever a virgin. Scriptural references to "brothers" of Christ are interpreted as kin. Due to her unique place in salvation history according to Eastern Orthodox teaching, Mary is honored above all other saints in this religion and especially venerated for the great work that God accomplished through her.

The Eastern Orthodox Church regards the bodies of all saints as holy because of their participation in prescribed rituals called holy mysteries. Physical items connected with saints are also regarded as holy through their participation in the earthly works of those saints. According to Eastern Orthodox church teaching and tradition, God himself bears witness to this holiness of saints' relics through the many miracles connected with them that have been reported throughout history since biblical times, often including healing from disease and injury.

=== Toll Houses ===
Toll Houses are a concept in certain portions of the Eastern Orthodox church that serves as a theory for the process of salvation. Toll Houses are a process and location in which demons and angels both try to find reason for a soul to be delivered to Hades or Heaven, respectively. Many saints and church fathers through history, such as St. Diadochos of Photiki, St. Mark of Ephesus, and St. Anthony the Great have spoken on or about Toll Houses, some even claiming to have visions of them. Books of the church such as the Canon of Supplication in The Great Book of Needs mention Toll Houses. The Eastern Orthodox Church is not in agreement on this, with many circles saying the teaching is false and of pagan or Gnostic origin.

=== Eschatology ===
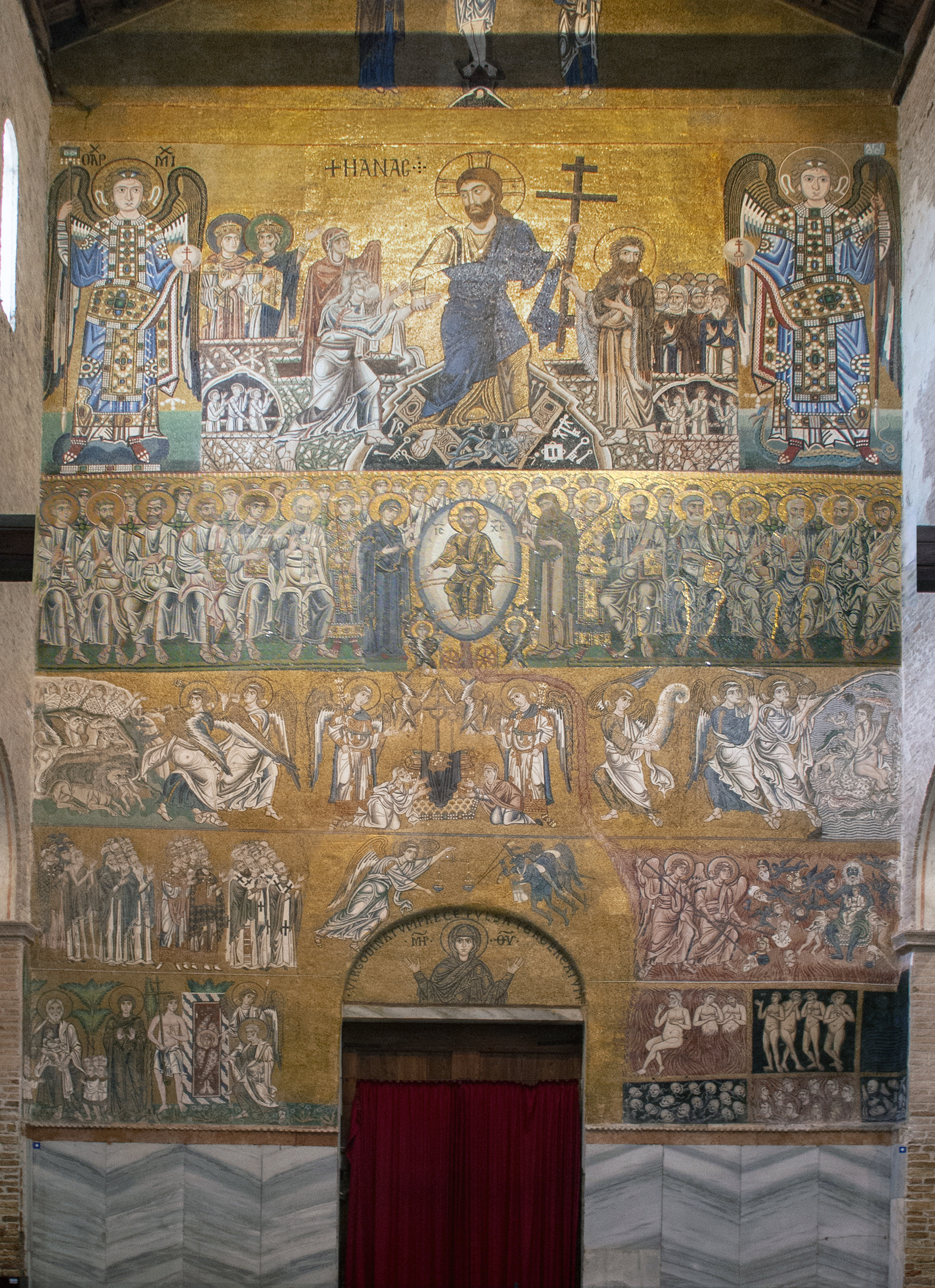
Last Judgment: 12th-century Byzantine mosaic from Torcello Cathedral

Eastern Orthodox Christians believe that when a person dies, the soul is temporarily separated from the body. Though it may linger for a short period on Earth, it is ultimately escorted either to paradise (Abraham's bosom) or the darkness of Hades, following the Temporary Judgment. Orthodox do not accept the doctrine of Purgatory, which is held by Catholicism. The soul's experience of either of these states is only a "foretaste"—being experienced only by the soul—until the Final Judgment, when the soul and body will be reunited.

The Eastern Orthodox believe that the state of the soul in Hades can be affected by the love and prayers of the righteous up until the Last Judgment. For this reason, the church offers a special prayer for the dead on the third day, ninth day, fortieth day, and the one-year anniversary after the death of an Eastern Orthodox Christian. There are also several days throughout the year that are set aside for general commemoration of the departed, sometimes including nonbelievers. These days usually fall on a Saturday, since it was on a Saturday that Christ lay in the Tomb.

The Eastern Orthodox believe that after the Final Judgment:

- All souls will be reunited with their resurrected bodies.
- All souls will fully experience their spiritual state.
- Having been perfected, the saints will forever progress towards a deeper and fuller love of God, which equates with eternal happiness.

=== Bible ===
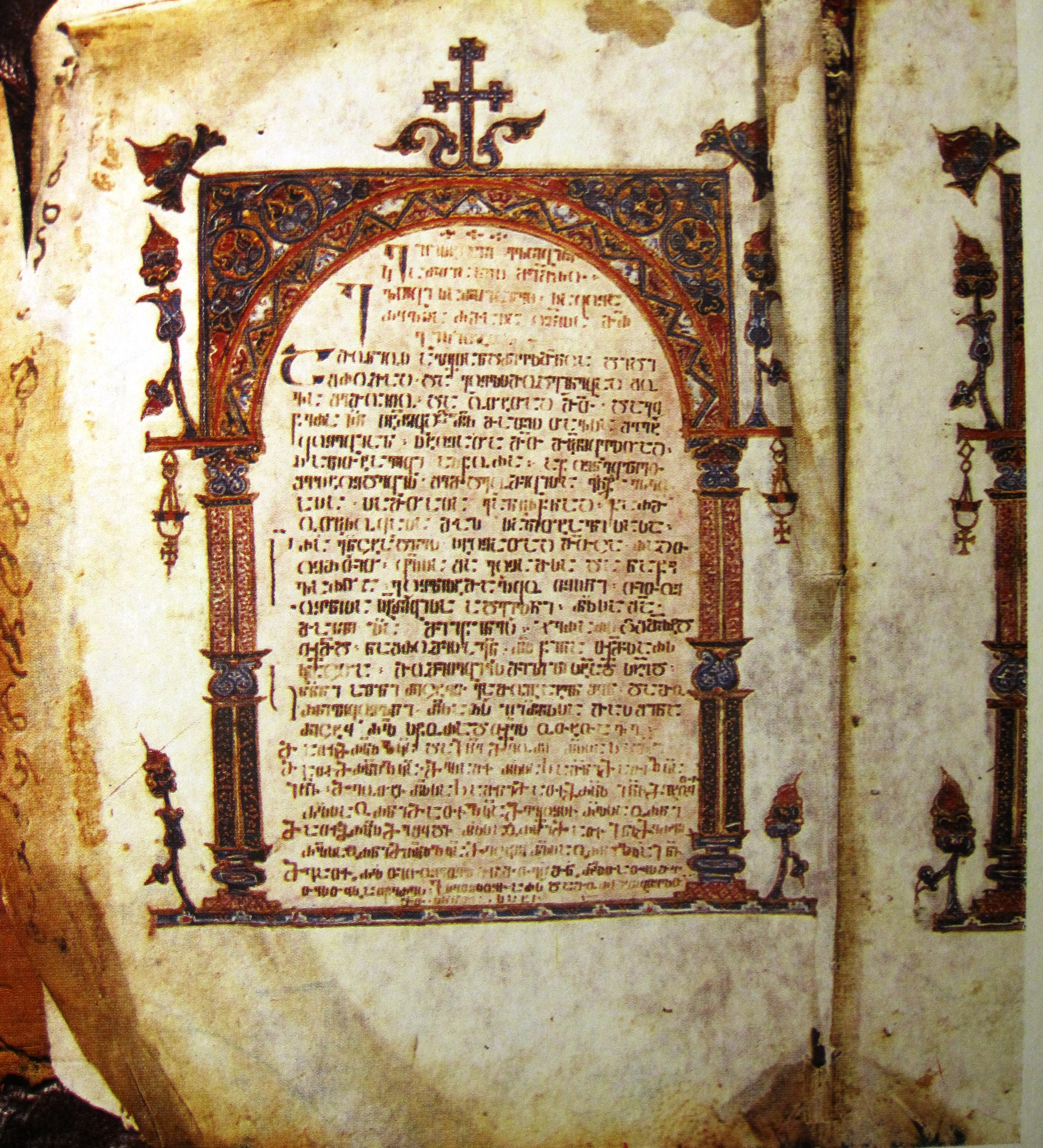
Alaverdi Gospels, an 11th-century Georgian illuminated manuscript Gospel Book

The official Bible of the Eastern Orthodox Church contains the Septuagint text of the Old Testament, with the Book of Daniel given in the translation by Theodotion. The Patriarchal Text is used for the New Testament. Orthodox Christians hold that the Bible is a verbal icon of Christ, as proclaimed by the 7th ecumenical council. They refer to the Bible as holy scripture, meaning writings containing the foundational truths of the Christian faith as revealed by Christ and the Holy Spirit to its divinely inspired human authors. Holy scripture forms the primary and authoritative written witness of holy tradition and is essential as the basis for all Orthodox teaching and belief.

Once established as holy scripture, there has never been any question that the Eastern Orthodox Church holds the collection of books traditionally recognized by it to be venerable and beneficial for reading and study, even though it informally holds some books in higher esteem than others, the four gospels highest of all. Of the subgroups significant enough to be named, the "Anagignoskomena" (ἀναγιγνωσκόμενα, "things that are read") comprises ten of the Old Testament books rejected in the Protestant canon, (Note: Including the deuterocanonical books) but deemed by the Eastern Orthodox worthy to be read in worship services, even though they carry a lesser esteem than the 39 books of the Hebrew canon. The lowest tier contains the remaining books not accepted by either Protestants or Catholics, among them, Psalm 151. Though it is a psalm and is in the book of Psalms, it is not classified as being within the Psalter (the first 150 psalms).

Eastern Orthodoxy does not subscribe to the doctrine of sola scriptura. Rather, Eastern Orthodoxy teaches that its church has defined what Scripture is, and therefore, its church also interprets the meanings of Scripture.

Scriptures are understood by Eastern Orthodox interpretation to contain historical fact, poetry, idiom, metaphor, simile, moral fable, parable, prophecy and wisdom literature, and each bears its own consideration in its interpretation. While divinely inspired, the text still consists of words in human languages, arranged in humanly recognisable forms. The Eastern Orthodox Church does not oppose honest critical and historical study of the Bible.

=== Holy tradition and patristic consensus ===
In Eastern Orthodoxy, "that faith which has been believed everywhere, always, and by all", the faith taught by Jesus to the apostles, given life by the Holy Spirit at Pentecost, and passed down to future generations without additions and without subtractions, is known as holy tradition. Holy tradition does not change in the Eastern Orthodox Church because it encompasses those things that do not change: the nature of the one God in Trinity, Father, Son, and Holy Spirit, the history of God's interactions with his peoples, the Law as given to the Israelites, all Christ's teaching as given to the disciples and Jews and recorded in scripture, including the parables, the prophecies, the miracles, and his own example to humanity in his extreme humility. It also encompasses the worship of the church, which grew out of the worship of the synagogue and temple and was extended by Christ at the last supper, and the relationship between God and his people that worship expresses, which is also evidenced between Christ and his disciples. It includes the authority that Christ bestowed on his disciples when he made them apostles.

Holy tradition is firm, even unyielding, but not rigid or legalistic; instead, it lives and breathes within the church. For example, the New Testament was entirely written by the early church (mostly the apostles). The whole Bible was accepted as scripture by means of holy tradition practiced within the early church. The writing and acceptance took five centuries, by which time the holy scriptures themselves had become in their entirety a part of holy tradition. But holy tradition did not change, because "that faith which has been believed everywhere, always, and by all" remained consistent, without additions, and without subtractions. The historical development of the Divine Liturgy and other worship services and devotional practices of the church provide a similar example of extension and growth "without change".

Besides these, holy tradition includes the doctrinal definitions and statements of faith of the seven ecumenical councils, including the Nicene-Constantinopolitan Creed, and some later local councils, patristic writings, canon law, and icons. Not all portions of holy tradition are held to be equally strong. Some—the holy scriptures foremost, certain aspects of worship, especially in the Divine Liturgy, the doctrines of the ecumenical councils, the Nicene-Constantinopolitan Creed—possess a verified authority that endures forever, irrevocably. However, with local councils and patristic writings, the church applies a selective judgement. Some councils and writers have occasionally fallen into error, and some contradict each other.

In other cases, opinions differ, no consensus is forthcoming, and all are free to choose. With agreement among the Church Fathers, though, the authority of interpretation grows, and full patristic consensus is very strong. With canon law (which tends to be highly rigorous and very strict, especially with clergy), an unalterable validity also does not apply, since canons deal with living on earth, where conditions are always changing and each case is subject to almost infinite variation from the next.

By tradition, the Eastern Orthodox Church, when faced with issues that are larger than a single bishop can resolve, holds a local council. The bishops convene (as St. Paul called the Corinthians to do) to seek the mind of the church. A council's declarations or edicts then reflect its consensus (if one can be found). An ecumenical council is only called for issues of such importance, difficulty or pervasiveness that smaller councils are insufficient to address them. Ecumenical councils' declarations and canons carry binding weight by virtue of their representation across the whole church, by which the mind of the church can be readily seen. However, not all issues are so difficult as to require an ecumenical council to resolve. Some doctrines or decisions, not defined in a formal statement or proclaimed officially, nevertheless are held by the church unshakably and unanimously without internal disturbance, and these, also reflecting the mind of the church, are just as firmly irrevocable as a formal declaration of an ecumenical council. Lack of formality does not imply lack of authority within holy tradition.

=== Territorial expansion and doctrinal integrity ===
As the church increased in size through the centuries, the logistical dynamics of operating such large entities shifted: patriarchs, metropolitans, archimandrites, abbots and abbesses all rose up to cover certain points of administration.

== Liturgy ==
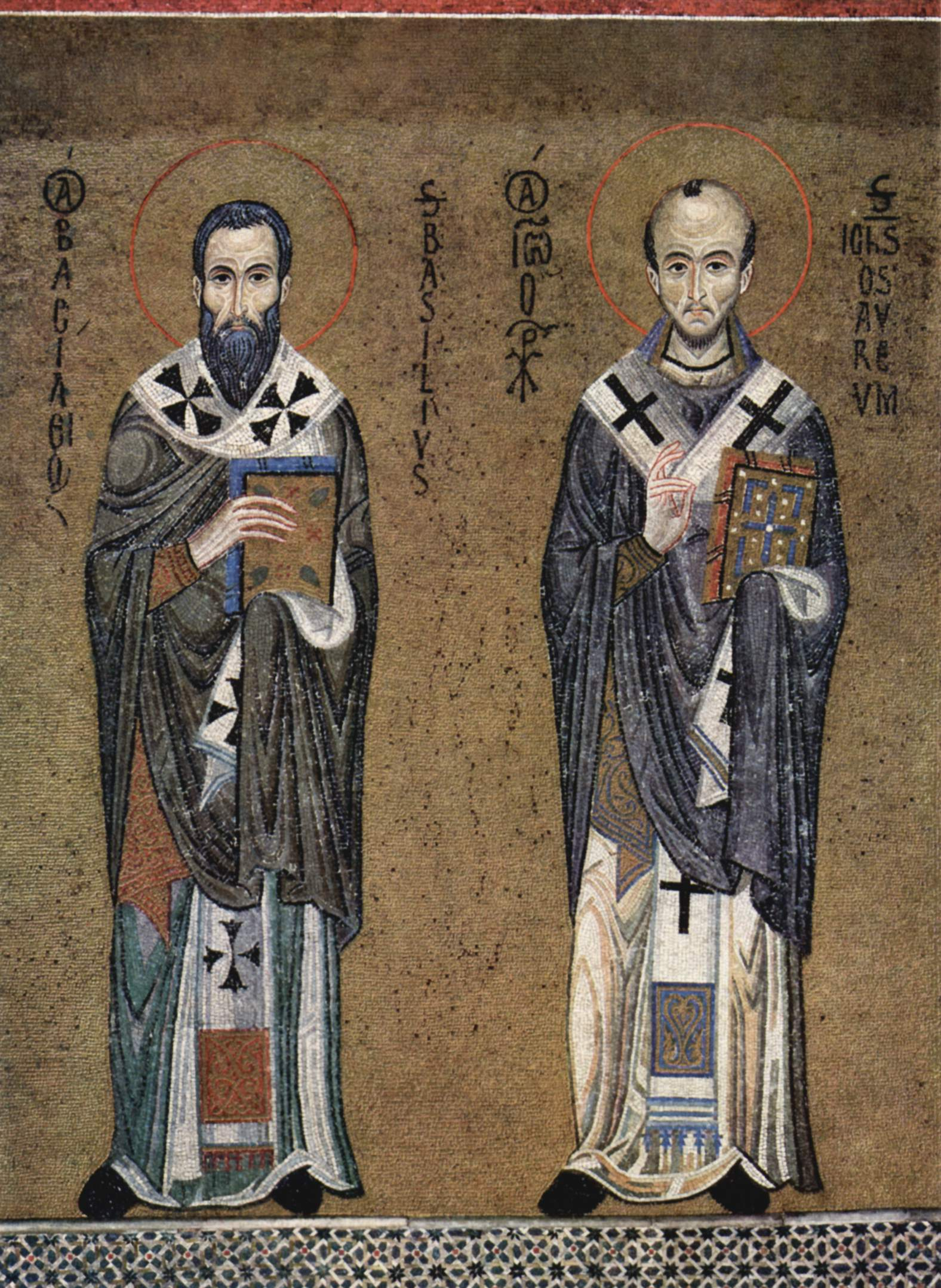
Icon of Ss. Basil the Great (left) and John Chrysostom, ascribed authors of the two most frequently used Eastern Orthodox Divine Liturgies, c. 1150 (mosaic in the Palatine Chapel, Palermo).

=== Church calendar ===
Lesser cycles also run in tandem with the annual ones. A weekly cycle of days prescribes a specific focus for each day in addition to others that may be observed:

Each day of the Weekly Cycle is dedicated to certain special memorials. Sunday is dedicated to Christ's Resurrection; Monday honors the holy bodiless powers (angels, archangels, etc.); Tuesday is dedicated to the prophets and especially the greatest of the prophets, St. John the Forerunner and Baptist of the Lord; Wednesday is consecrated to the Cross and recalls Judas' betrayal; Thursday honors the holy apostles and hierarchs, especially St. Nicholas, Bishop of Myra in Lycia; Friday is also consecrated to the Cross and recalls the day of the Crucifixion; Saturday is dedicated to All Saints, especially the Mother of God, and to the memory of all those who have departed this life in the hope of resurrection and eternal life.

=== Church services ===
The main service offered in the church is the divine liturgy. Most parishes offer this service on Sunday mornings and on major feast days, though it can be offered almost any day of the year. Additional services include Orthros and Vespers; prayer services in the morning and evening, respectively. The celebration of the feasts are distinguished according to their various degrees of solemnity. The great feasts may be celebrated with an All Night Vigil. Lesser feasts may have a vigil according to the feast's custom.

Church service books are used in divine services, like the Gospel, the Epistle, and the Psalter. These books, often called divine service books were composed in accordance with the scriptures and traditions of the Church Fathers and teachers of the Orthodox Church.

==== Chanting ====
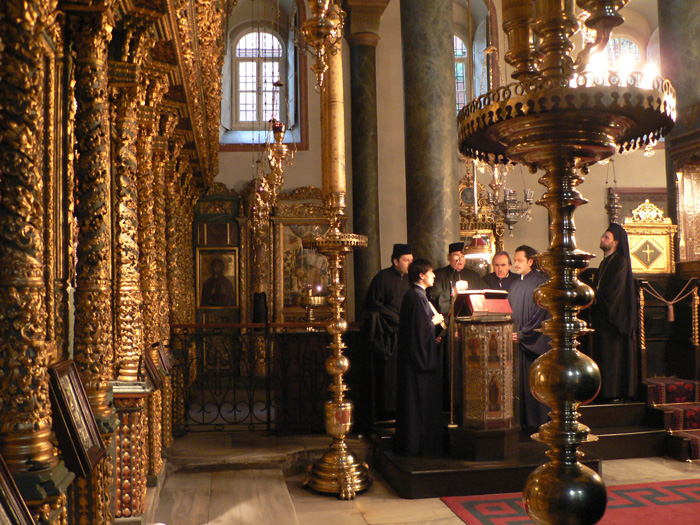
Chanters singing on the kliros at the Church of St. George, Patriarchate of Constantinople

Chanting is not considered "music" by Orthodox Christians, but rather sacred melody and prayer, in Orthodox Theology. An Orthodox Divine Service is chanted in its entirety by the clergy, the choir, and the congregation from the start of the service to the end. Early Christian forms of chanting began with ancient Judaic traditions of chanting the Psalms, which priests have now declared with the hymns in the Book of Psalms. As the church grew, so did persecution, and many new forms of hymns began to appear.

Liturgies contain the reading and chanting of prayers, headed by a bishop or priest. Forms of chanting services vary across liturgies (for example, the Liturgy of St. Basil the Great has chanting of longer duration and the priest privately reads his prayers at the altar). For the composition of religious chant, the Octoechos, an eight-tone (mode) system, analogous to the Gregorian modes in the West, and to other ancient Christian musical systems, is used. Byzantine music is microtonal.

Byzantine chants are associated with the Eastern Roman Empire's period (AD 330 to 1453) and developed from Jewish and Syrian traditions in the early-Christian Church. This continued to evolve throughout the 16th century. However, many mistake it for Greek Christianity in the east, but is unrelated to the ancient Greek period.

Northern Slavs, however, have used simpler tonal systems evolved through the sundry local types of Znamenny chant; today Western music, often with four-part harmony, and the "tones" are simply sets of melodies. Russian liturgical chants (including some Ukrainian and Balkan churches) evolved from the Kievan Rus people in AD 988. Byzantine melodies adapted to the patterns of the Old Church Slavonic language. In the 14th century, Russian elements began to be used in the church. By the 16th century, Russian chants had many links to the Byzantine style.

There are numerous versions and styles that are traditional and acceptable and these vary a great deal between cultures.

== Traditions ==
=== Monasticism ===
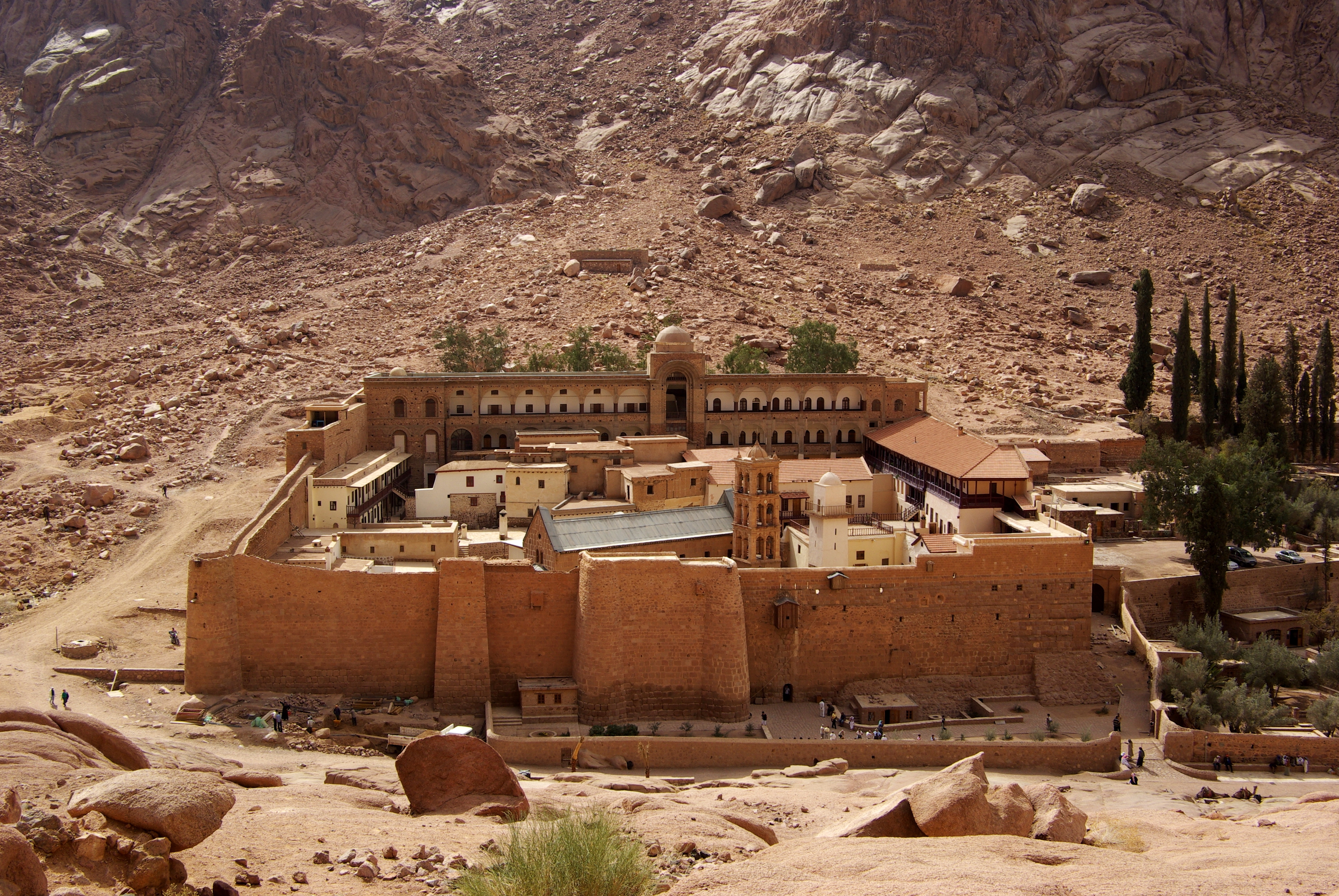
Saint Catherine's Monastery (6th century), Sinai Peninsula, Egypt

The Eastern Orthodox Church places emphasis and awards a high level of prestige to traditions of monasticism and asceticism with roots in Early Christianity in the Near East and Byzantine Anatolia. The most important centres of Christian Orthodox monasticism are Saint Catherine's Monastery in the Sinai Peninsula (Egypt) and Mount Athos in Northern Greece.

All bishops are monks; if a man who is not a monk is elected a bishop, he must be tonsured a monk before he may be consecrated. Customarily, also, a man must either be a monk or be married to be ordained.

=== Icons and symbols ===
==== Icons ====
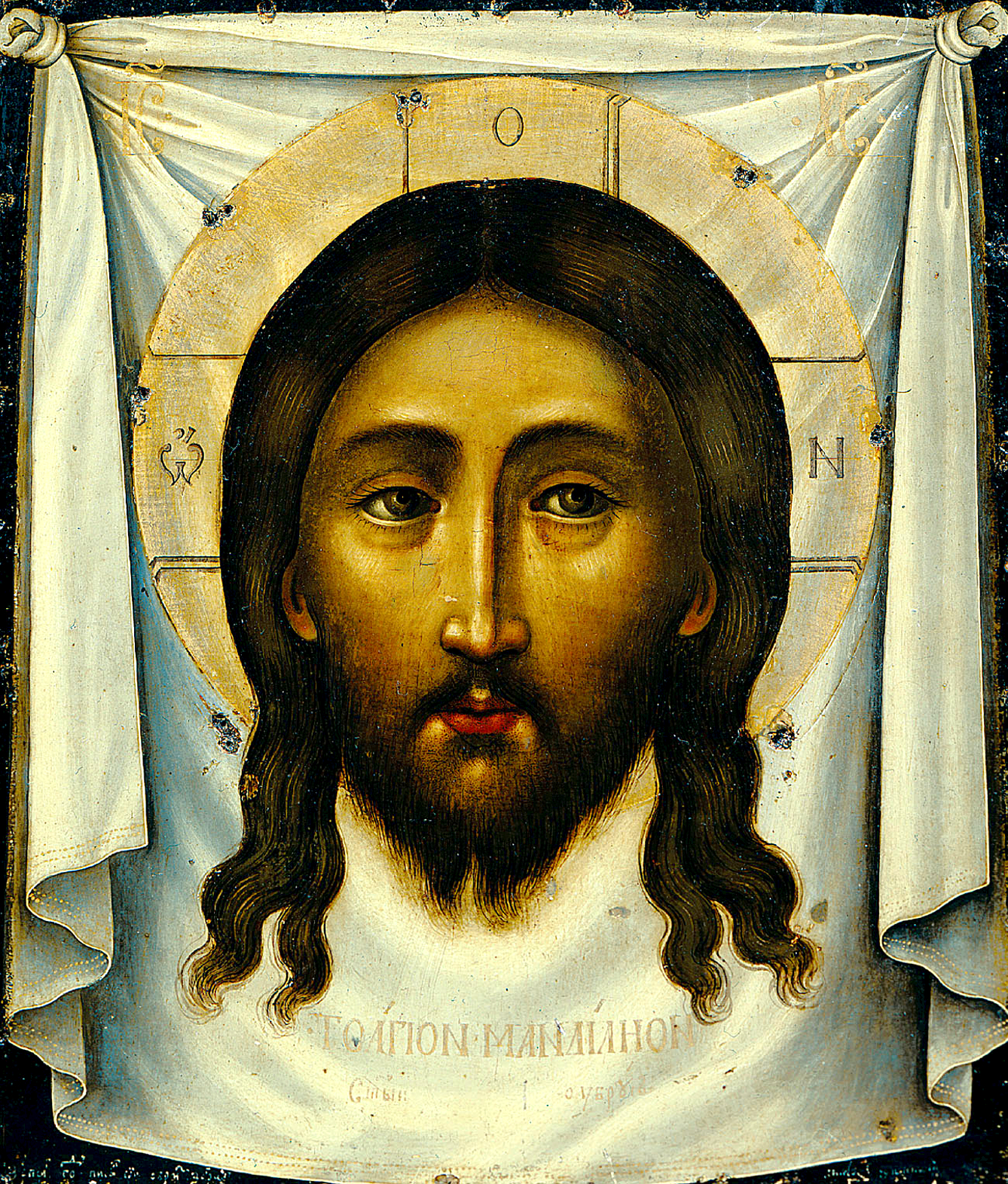
Image of the Saviour Not Made by Hand: a traditional Orthodox iconography in the interpretation of Simon Ushakov (1658).

Aspects of the iconography borrow from the pre-Christian Roman and Hellenistic art. Henry Chadwick wrote, "In this instinct there was a measure of truth. The representations of Christ as the Almighty Lord on his judgment throne owed something to pictures of Zeus. Portraits of the Mother of God were not wholly independent of a pagan past of venerated mother-goddesses. In the popular mind the saints had come to fill a role that had been played by heroes and deities."

Icons can be found adorning the walls of churches and often cover the inside structure completely. Most Eastern Orthodox homes have an area set aside for family prayer, usually an eastern facing wall, where are hung many icons. Icons have been part of Orthodox Christianity since the beginning of the church.

==== Iconostasis ====
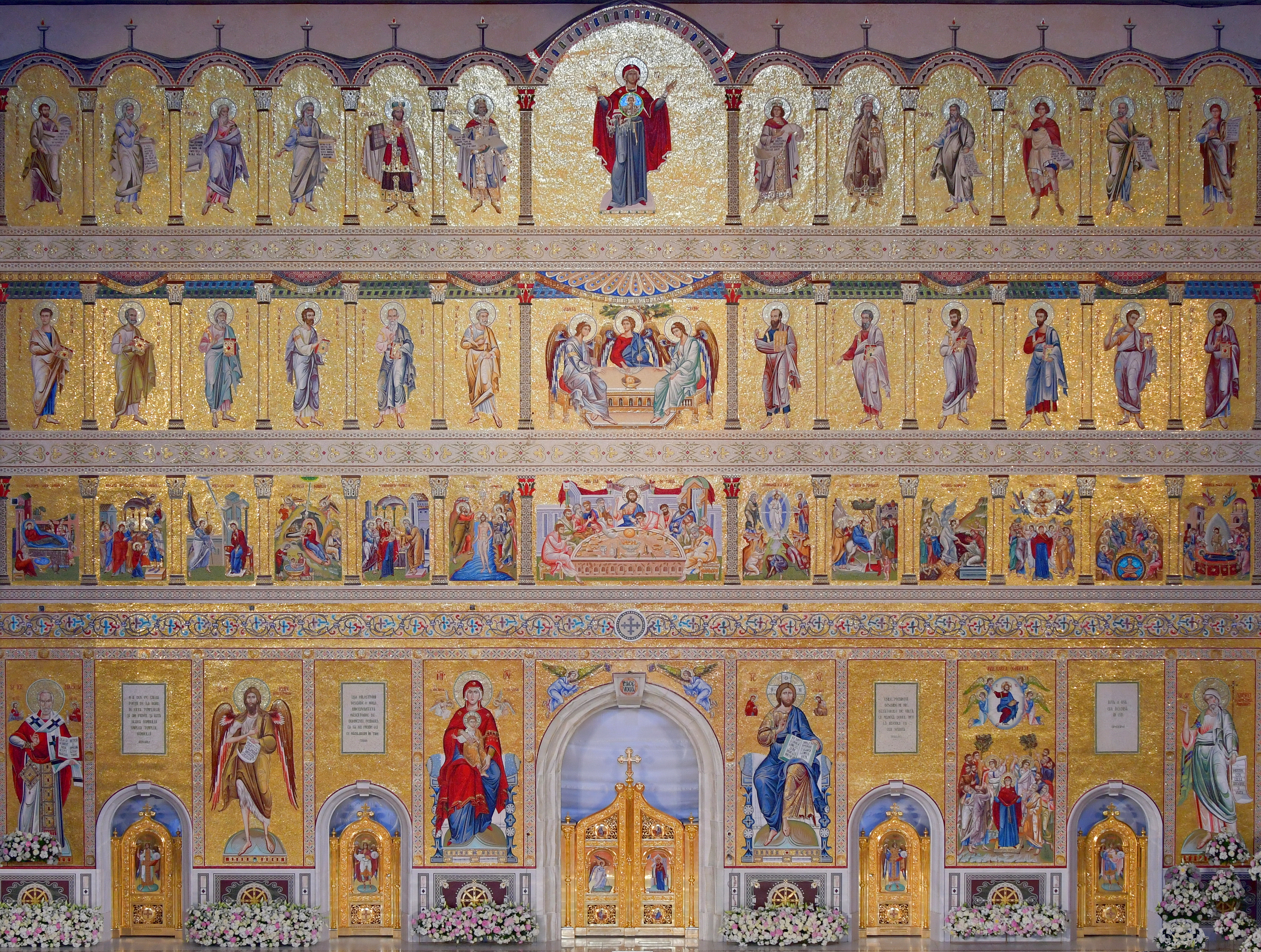
Iconostasis of the Romanian People's Salvation Cathedral

An iconostasis, also called the templon, is a wall of icons and religious paintings, separating the nave from the sanctuary in a church. Iconostasis also refers to a portable icon stand that can be placed anywhere within a church. The modern iconostasis evolved from the Byzantine templon in the 11th century. The evolution of the iconostasis probably owes a great deal to 14th-century Hesychast mysticism and the wood-carving genius of the Russian Orthodox Church.

The first ceiling-high, five-leveled Russian iconostasis was designed by Andrey Rublyov in the cathedral of the Dormition in Vladimir in 1408.

==== Cross ====
Greek cross

Russian Orthodox cross

On the Russian Orthodox cross, the small top crossbar represents the sign that Pontius Pilate nailed above Christ's head. It often is inscribed with an acronym, "INRI", Latin: Iesus Nazarenus, Rex Iudaeorum for "Jesus of Nazareth, King of the Jews" or "INBI", Koine Greek: Ἰησοῦς ὁ Ναζωραῖος ὁ βασιλεύς τῶν Ἰουδαίων for "Jesus of Nazareth, King of the Jews".

Other crosses associated with the Eastern Orthodox Church are the more traditional single-bar crosses, budded designs, the Greek cross, Latin cross, Jerusalem cross (cross pattée), Celtic crosses, and others. A common symbolism of the slanted foot stool is the foot-rest points up, toward Heaven, on Christ's right hand-side, and downward, to Hades, on Christ's left. "Between two thieves Thy Cross did prove to be a balance of righteousness: wherefore one of them was dragged down to Hades by the weight of his blasphemy [the balance points downward], whereas the other was lightened of his transgressions unto the comprehension of theology [the balance points upward]. O Christ God, glory to Thee."

=== Art and architecture ===
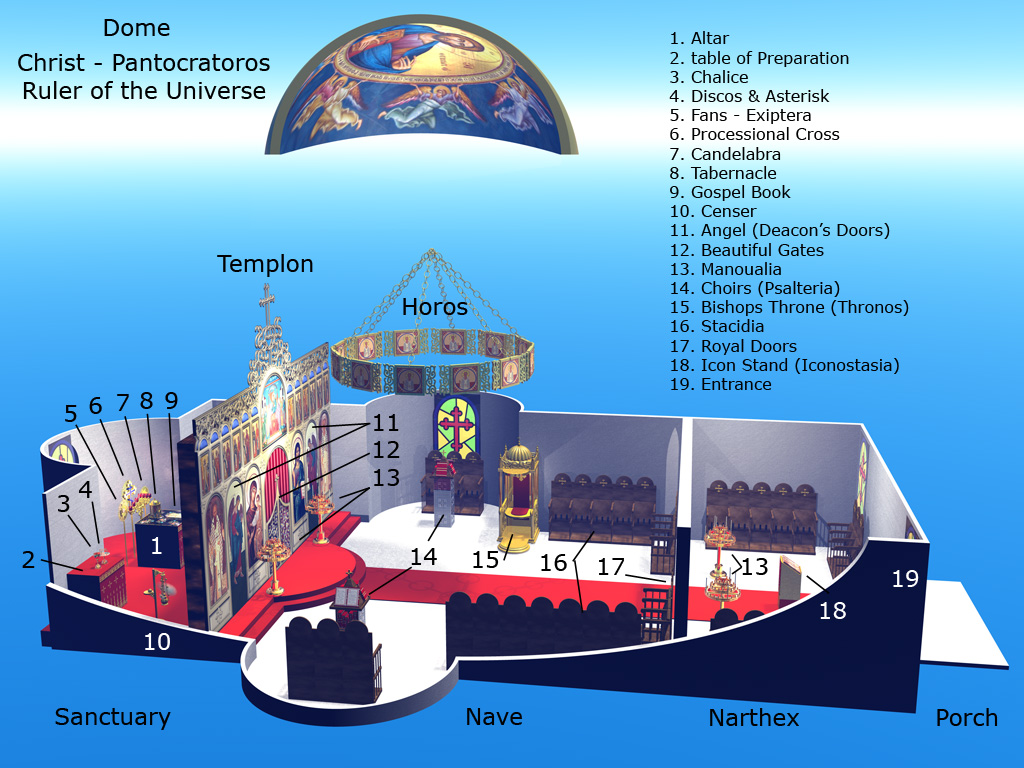
An illustration of the traditional interior of an Eastern Orthodox church

The Archdiocesan Cathedral of the Holy Trinity on New York City's Upper East Side is the largest Eastern Orthodox Christian church in the Western Hemisphere.

== Holy mysteries (sacraments) ==
Those things which in the West are often termed sacraments or sacramentals are known among the Eastern Orthodox as the "sacred mysteries". While the Catholic Church numbers seven sacraments, and many Protestant groups list two (baptism and the Eucharist) or even none, the Eastern Orthodox do not limit the number. However, for the sake of convenience, catechisms often speak of the seven great mysteries. Among these are Holy Communion (the most direct connection), baptism, Chrismation, confession, unction, matrimony, and ordination. But the term also properly applies to other sacred actions such as monastic tonsure or the blessing of holy water, and involves fasting, almsgiving, or an act as simple as lighting a candle, burning incense, praying or asking God's blessing on food.

=== Baptism ===
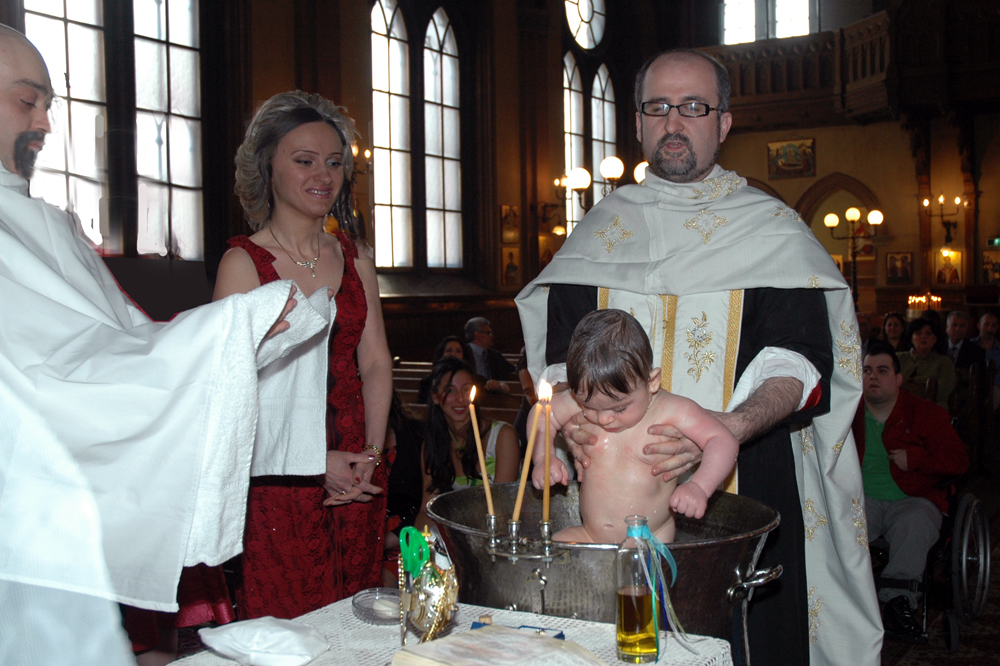
An Eastern Orthodox baptism

Baptism is the mystery which transforms the old and sinful person into a new and pure one; the old life, the sins, any mistakes made are gone and a clean slate is given. Through baptism a person is united to the Body of Christ by becoming a member of the Eastern Orthodox Church. During the service, water is blessed. The catechumen is fully immersed in the water three times in the name of the Trinity. This is considered to be a death of the "old man" by participation in the crucifixion and burial of Christ, and a rebirth into new life in Christ by participation in his resurrection.

Properly, the mystery of baptism is administered by bishops and priests; however, in emergencies any Eastern Orthodox Christian can baptize.

=== Chrismation ===
Chrismation (sometimes called confirmation) is the mystery by which a baptized person is granted the gift of the Holy Spirit through anointing with Holy Chrism. It is normally given immediately after baptism as part of the same service, but is also used to receive lapsed members of the Eastern Orthodox Church. As baptism is a person's participation in the death and resurrection of Christ, so Chrismation is a person's participation in the coming of the Holy Spirit at Pentecost.

As soon as possible after chrismation one receives the Eucharist regardless of age.

Anointing with chrism substitutes for the laying-on of hands described in the New Testament.

=== Holy Communion (Eucharist) ===
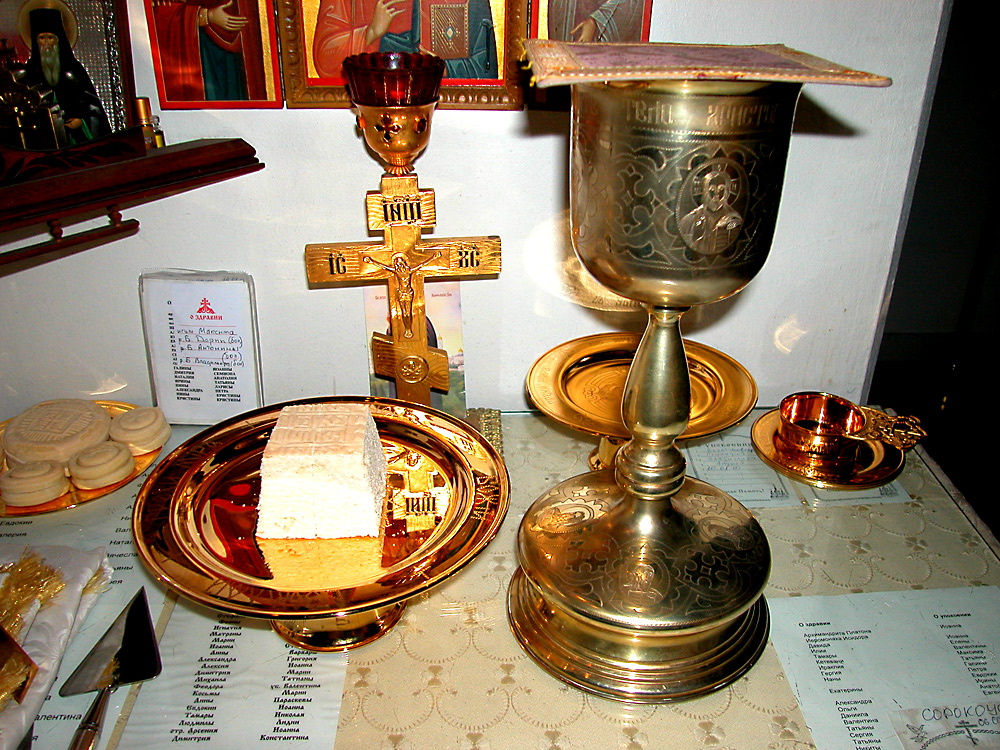
Eucharistic elements prepared for the Divine Liturgy

Communion is given only to baptized and chrismated Eastern Orthodox Christians who have prepared by fasting, prayer and confession, and not in mortal sin. The priest will combine the leavened bread and the win in a spoon, called a "cochlear", the priest then administers the gifts, believed to be the Body and Blood of Christ, directly into the recipient's mouth from the chalice. From baptism, young infants and children are carried to the chalice to receive holy communion.

==== Leavened Bread ====
In the Eastern Orthdox Church leavened bread is used instead of the unleavened waffers of many Protestant and Catholic churches. The church rejects the symbolism of the Passover feast, instead preferingto use leavened bread as symbolic of Jesus Christ rising from the grave, the Incarnation, and the Kingdom in Heaven, along with following traditional apostolic practice.

=== Repentance (Confession) ===
Orthodox dioceses require confession at least once a year if one is a regular communicant of the church. Though no more is mandated, different systems for increased confession have seen wide usage than others. These systems include confession before participating in the Holy Eucharist, during the 4 periods of fasting (Great Lent, Nativity Fast, Apostles' Fast and Dormition Fast), and once a month. Those who have not committed a mortal sin and commune regularly are not required unless bid to do so by God to partake in Confession before partaking in the Eucharist.

Confession is always required for Mortal Sins, but frequent Confession is encouraged for members who derive benefit from it. After Confession, he or she receives Communion immediately afterwards, as it is seen as the seal of all things and unites the members back fully to the church.

=== Marriage ===
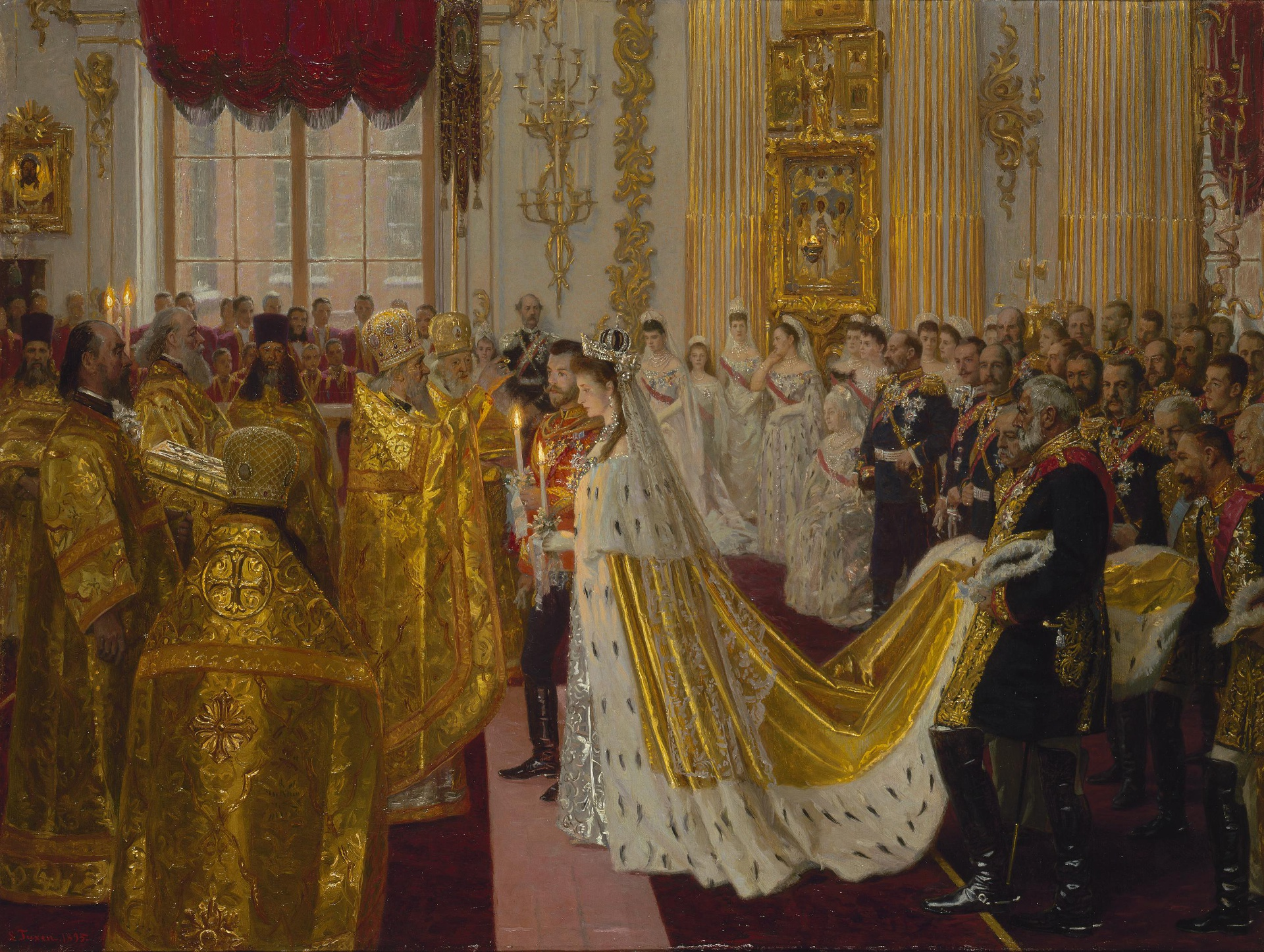
The wedding of Tsar Nicholas II of Russia

From the Orthodox perspective, marriage is one of the holy mysteries or sacraments. As well as in many other Christian traditions, for example in Catholicism, it serves to unite a woman and a man in eternal union and love before God, with the purpose of following Christ and his Gospel and raising up a faithful, holy family through their holy union. The church understands marriage to be the union of one man and one woman, and certain Orthodox leaders have spoken out strongly in opposition to the civil institution of same-sex marriage.

Jesus said that "when they rise from the dead, they neither marry nor are given in marriage, but are like angels in heaven" (Mk 12:25). For the Orthodox Christian this passage should not be understood to imply that Christian marriage will not remain a reality in the Kingdom, but points to the fact that relations will not be "fleshy", but "spiritual". Love between wife and husband, as an icon of relationship between Christ and church, is eternal.

The church does recognize that there are rare occasions when it is better that couples do separate, but there is no official recognition of civil divorces. For the Eastern Orthodox, to say that marriage is indissoluble means that it should not be broken, the violation of such a union, perceived as holy, being an offense resulting from either adultery or the prolonged absence of one of the partners. Thus, permitting remarriage is an act of compassion of the church towards sinful man.

=== Holy orders ===
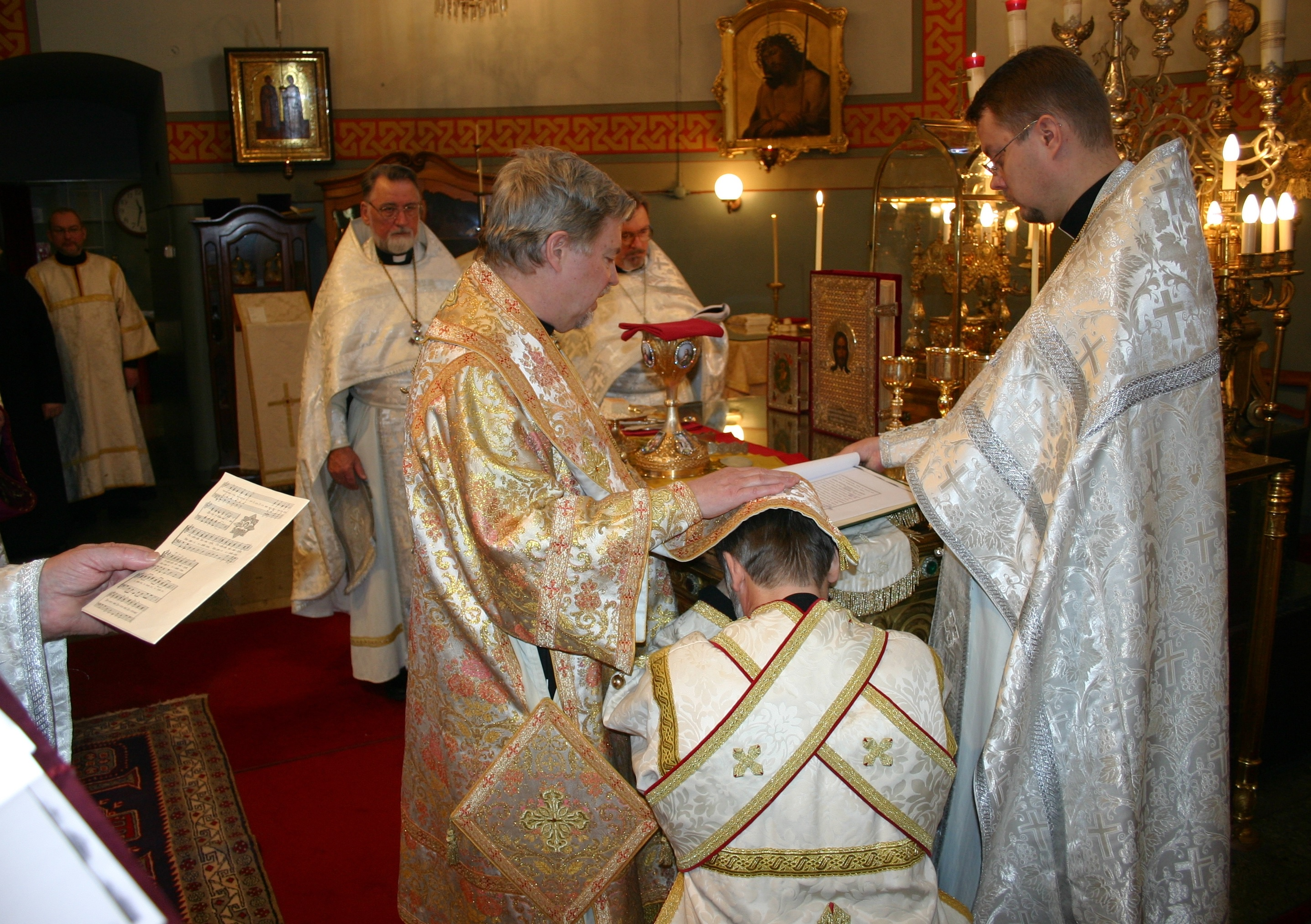
Eastern Orthodox subdeacon being ordained to the diaconate. The bishop has placed his omophorion and right hand on the head of the candidate and is reading the Prayer of Cheirotonia.

Widowed priests and deacons may not remarry and it is common for such members of the clergy to retire to a monastery (see clerical celibacy). This is also true of widowed wives of clergy, who do not remarry and become nuns when their children are grown. Only men are allowed to receive holy orders, although deaconesses historically had both liturgical and pastoral functions within the church.

In 2016, the Patriarchate of Alexandria decided to reintroduce the order of deaconess. In February 2017, Patriarch Theodore II consecrated six women to be subdeacons within the Patriarchate of Alexandria. In 2024, the Patriarchate ordained the first woman in the modern period to be a deaconess.

== Distribution ==
Distribution of Eastern Orthodoxy in the world by country Dominant religion Important minority religion

Eastern Orthodoxy is the predominant religion in Russia (62%), where roughly half the world's Eastern Orthodox Christians live. The religion is also heavily concentrated in the rest of Eastern Europe, where it is the majority religion in Ukraine (65%–77%), Romania (73%), Greece (90%), Belarus (60%), Serbia (81%), Bulgaria (62%), Moldova (94%), Georgia (82%), North Macedonia (46%), Cyprus (74%) and Montenegro (71%).

Significant Orthodox minorities were present in several European countries: Bosnia and Herzegovina (31%), Estonia (16%), Latvia (14%), Albania (8%), Lithuania (4%), Croatia (3%), Slovenia (2%), Germany (2%), and Finland (1.5%).

In the post-Soviet states of Central Asia, Eastern Orthodoxy constitutes significant minority in Kazakhstan (17%), Turkmenistan (6%), Kyrgyzstan (3%), Uzbekistan (2%), and Azerbaijan (2%).

Significant Eastern Orthodox populations in the Eastern Mediterranean (primarily Greek Orthodox) are in Lebanon (8%), Syria (5–8%), Jordan (2–5%), State of Palestine (1–2.5%), and Israel (1–2%).

== Local customs ==
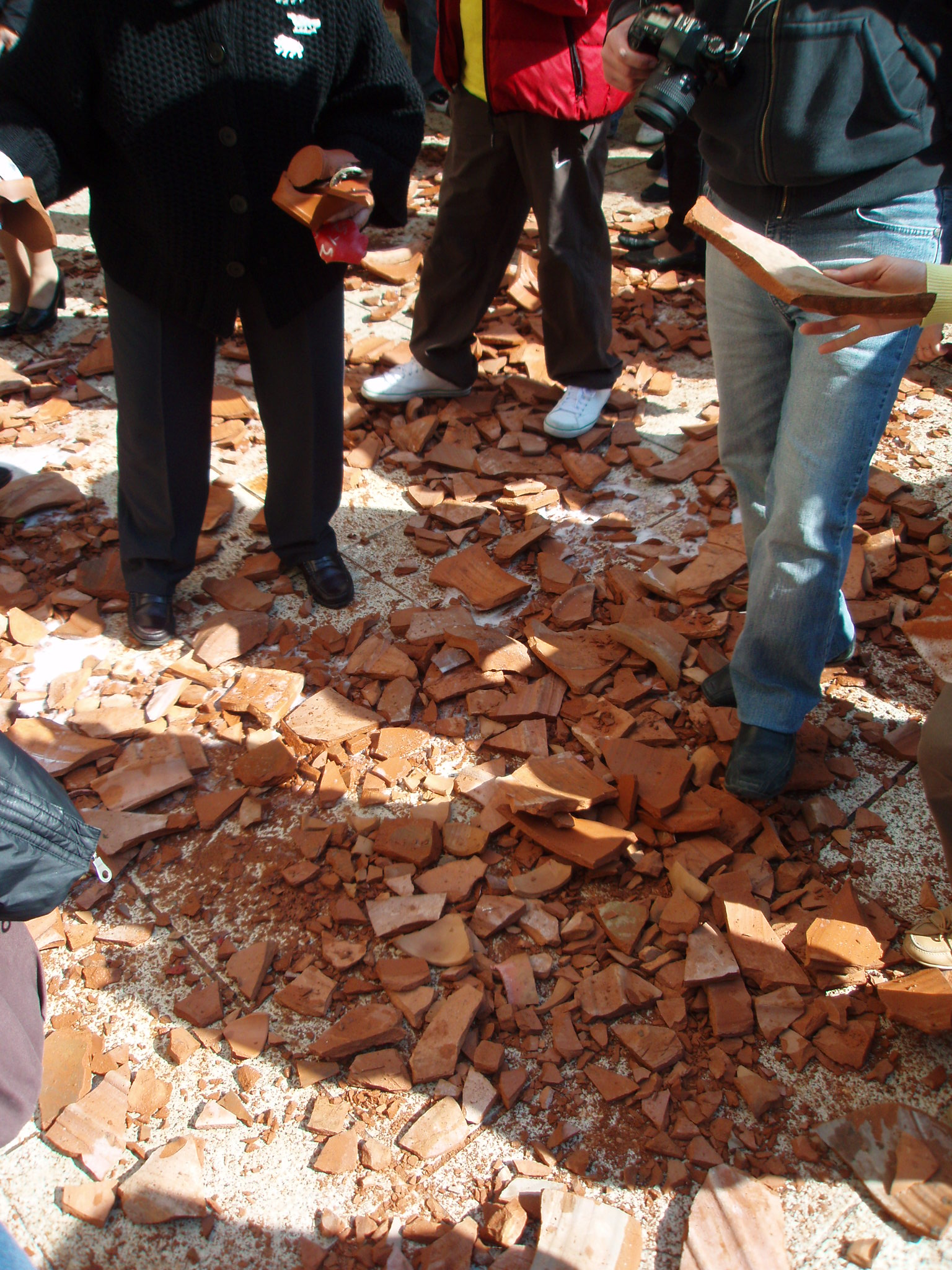
Shards of pottery vases on the street, after being thrown from the windows of nearby houses. A Holy Saturday tradition in Corfu.

Locality is also expressed in regional terms of churchly jurisdiction, which is often also drawn along national lines. Many Orthodox churches adopt a national title (e.g. Albanian Orthodox, Bulgarian Orthodox, Georgian Orthodox, Greek Orthodox, Romanian Orthodox, Russian Orthodox, Serbian Orthodox, Ukrainian Orthodox, etc.) and this title can identify which language is used in services, which bishops preside, and which of the typica is followed by specific congregations. In the Middle East, Orthodox Christians are usually referred to as Rum ("Roman") Orthodox, because of their historical connection with the Eastern Roman (Byzantine) Empire.

== See also ==
- Orthodoxy
- Eastern Orthodox liturgical calendar
- Revised Julian calendar
- Theological differences between the Catholic Church and the Eastern Orthodox Church
- List of Eastern Orthodox saints
- List of Eastern Orthodox Christians
