= Rolland D. McCune =

American theologian and Baptist minister (1934–2019)

Rolland Dale McCune (June 3, 1934 – June 17, 2019) was an American theologian and ordained Baptist minister (First Baptist Church of Warsaw, Indiana). He was professor of Systematic Theology at the Independent Baptist Detroit Baptist Theological Seminary in Allen Park, Michigan, where he had been the President of the Seminary for ten years and then Dean of the Faculty for six years. He was active at the Detroit Baptist Theological Seminary from 1981 to 2009.

He is the author of several books and numerous articles and course syllabi in Christian theology and related topics.

== Life ==
McCune was born and raised near Berne, Indiana. He earned the Bachelor of Arts degree at Taylor University, Fort Wayne Campus (Indiana), and the Bachelor of Divinity, Master of Theology, and Doctor of Theology degrees at Grace Theological Seminary in Winona Lake, Indiana. He made six trips to the Middle East, visiting such countries of the Bible as Italy, Turkey, Greece, Jordan, Israel, and Egypt. Twice he participated in the Bible Geography Seminar at the Institute of Holy Land Studies in Jerusalem. He was ordained to the ministry by the First Baptist Church of Warsaw, Indiana.

McCune pastored churches in Missouri and Indiana, and had numerous interim pastorates in Indiana, Minnesota, and Michigan. For fourteen years he was on the faculty of the Central Baptist Theological Seminary of Minneapolis, serving in the capacities of Professor, Registrar, and Dean. He at one time served on the Board of Trustees of The Minnesota Baptist Association and on the faculty of the Indiana Baptist College in Indianapolis. In 1977 he was chosen by his college alma mater for honorary membership in the Delta Epsilon Chi, the honor society of the American Association of Bible Colleges. In 1986 he was conferred with an honorary Doctor of Divinity Degree by Pillsbury Baptist Bible College, Owatonna, Minnesota. He began his ministry in Allen Park in 1981. Central Baptist Theological Seminary of Plymouth, MN conferred an honorary degree, Doctor of Humane Letters, upon McCune in May 2019.

McCune wrote numerous articles and extensive course syllabi in Systematic Theology, Presuppositional Apologetics, New Evangelicalism, History of Israel, Basic Bible Doctrine, and Dispensationalism, and a teacher's handbook on the Book of Daniel. Promise Unfulfilled: The Failed Strategy of Modern Evangelicalism was published by Ambassador-Emerald in 2004, and has been described as "the most penetrating evaluation of the new evangelicalism [to date]".

McCune was married to the former Daisy Heller of near Berne, Indiana, and they had three married children. He died on Monday June 17, 2019 at his home in Florida at the age of 85 after a brief struggle with pancreatic cancer.

== Theological views ==
=== Neo-Evangelicalism ===
Rolland D. McCune was highly critical of the Neo-Evangelical movement, instead preferring Christian fundamentalism. He rejected the lack of ecclesiastical separation and his perceived priority of pragmatism within neo-Evangelicalism.

=== Bibliology ===
Although McCune criticized individuals who would deny the doctrine of preservation of the scriptures, he did not teach King James Onlyism unlike some other Independent Baptists do. He instead argued that the words of God are preserved in the manuscript tradition as a whole.

=== Dispensationalism ===
McCune was a dispensationalist, being strongly critical of post-millennialism.

=== Doctrine of God ===
McCune upheld the doctrine of the trinity, seeing it as a necessary doctrine of scripture. He believed there are functional differences in the economic Trinity, arguing that in the administration and activities of the Trinity, the Son is subordinate to the Father, and the Spirit is subordinate to both the Father and the Son. However, he taught that the distinctions of the persons of the Trinity within the essence of God, as well as the order of their works, are explained by the eternal generation of the Son and the eternal procession of the Holy Spirit from the Father and Son. McCune argued that the Greek word monogenēs used in John 3:16 implies the idea of "begottenness," viewing it as confirmation of the doctrine of eternal generation. He believed the eternal relations of generation and procession ground the structure and order of the Trinity's works in creation.

== Publications ==
- A Systematic Theology of Biblical Christianity: Volume 1: Prolegomena and the Doctrines of Scripture, God, and Angels, Detroit Baptist Theological Seminary, 2009, ISBN 978-0-9822527-0-3.
- A Systematic Theology of Biblical Christianity: Volume 2: The Doctrines of Man, Sin, and the Holy Spirit, Detroit Baptist Theological Seminary, 2009, ISBN 978-0-9822527-1-0.
- A Systematic Theology of Biblical Christianity: Volume 3: the doctrines of Salvation, the Church, and Last Things, Detroit Baptist Theological Seminary, 2010, ISBN 978-0982252727
- Promise Unfulfilled: The Failed Strategy of Modern Evangelicalism Ambassador Emerald International, 2004, ISBN 978-1-932307-31-3.
- "The Self-Identity of Fundamentalism", Detroit Baptist Seminary Journal, Spring 1996
- "Doctrinal Non-Issues in Historical Fundamentalism", Detroit Baptist Seminary Journal, Fall 1996
- "The Formation of the New Evangelicalism (Part One): Historical and Theological Antecedents", Detroit Baptist Seminary Journal, Fall 1998
- "The Formation of the New Evangelicalism (Part Two): Historical Beginnings", Detroit Baptist Seminary Journal, Fall 1999
- "The New Evangelicalism and Apologetics", Detroit Baptist Seminary Journal, Fall 2001
- "The Younger Evangelicals: A Review Article", Detroit Baptist Seminary Journal, Fall 2003
- "The New Evangelicalism: Evaluations and Prospects", Detroit Baptist Seminary Journal, Fall 2003
