= Temporal sonship of Christ =

Christian doctrine

The temporal sonship of Christ is a Christian doctrine, which claims that the Logos became the Son of God in the incarnation. Thus, the Logos is not viewed as being eternally the Son of God by eternal generation, but instead became the Son of God in the incarnation. This doctrine has been associated with forms of Social Trinitarianism and Modalistic Monarchianism.

== History ==
The idea that Jesus was the eternally generated Son of God was first explicitly affirmed by Origen (185 – c. 253), and the idea was affirmed in the Council of Nicaea. However, in contrast the writer Marcellus of Ancyra (died 374) argued that the Logos only became the Son in the incarnation, believing that there is no biblical grounds for affirming the eternal generation of the Son.

Eternal Generation was also rejected by the antitrinitarian Michael Servetus (1509 or 1511), who was burned at the stake for his views on the trinity. The temporal Sonship view of Christ was also held by the Restorationist Alexander Campbell, who believed that the usage of the term "Eternal Son" is insufficient, and instead only opted to use the language of "the Word" in describing the preincarnate Christ. Campbell denied dependence upon any writers for his understanding of the Sonship of Christ, however it is possible he had been partially influenced by the denial of the eternal Sonship of Christ by the Methodist writer Adam Clarke (1762 – 1832)).

Within the 1800s, the eternal sonship of Christ began to be denied by the Plymouth Brethren author Frederick E. Raven, which caused large division within Brethren churches in the 20th century, as James Taylor began to follow the "temporal Sonship" the views of F. E. Raven. A similar division was created in American Fundamentalism in the 1990s, after John MacArthur published a booklet critiquing the eternal Sonship view of Christ. However, in 1999 MacArthur retracted of his former denial of the eternal Sonship of Christ.

== Doctrine ==
William Lane Craig, a proponent of Social Trinitarianism, has critiqued the doctrine of the eternal generation of the Son. He argues that the term monogenes ("only begotten") does not refer to Christ's eternal existence but solely to His humanity. According to Craig, viewing the Logos as eternally generated introduces an element of subordination within the Trinity. Similarly, the Methodist theologian Adam Clarke contended that Luke 1:35 demonstrates Jesus' sonship as temporal rather than eternal, and while John Wesley was aware of Clarke's objections to the classical view of eternal generation, he ultimately upheld it. In contrast, Baptist writer J. C. Philpot defended the doctrine of Christ's eternal Sonship, asserting that Luke 1:35 does not indicate that Jesus became the Son at the incarnation but rather that He would merely be called the Son due to it.
