= Eternal generation of the Son =

Trinitarian christological doctrine

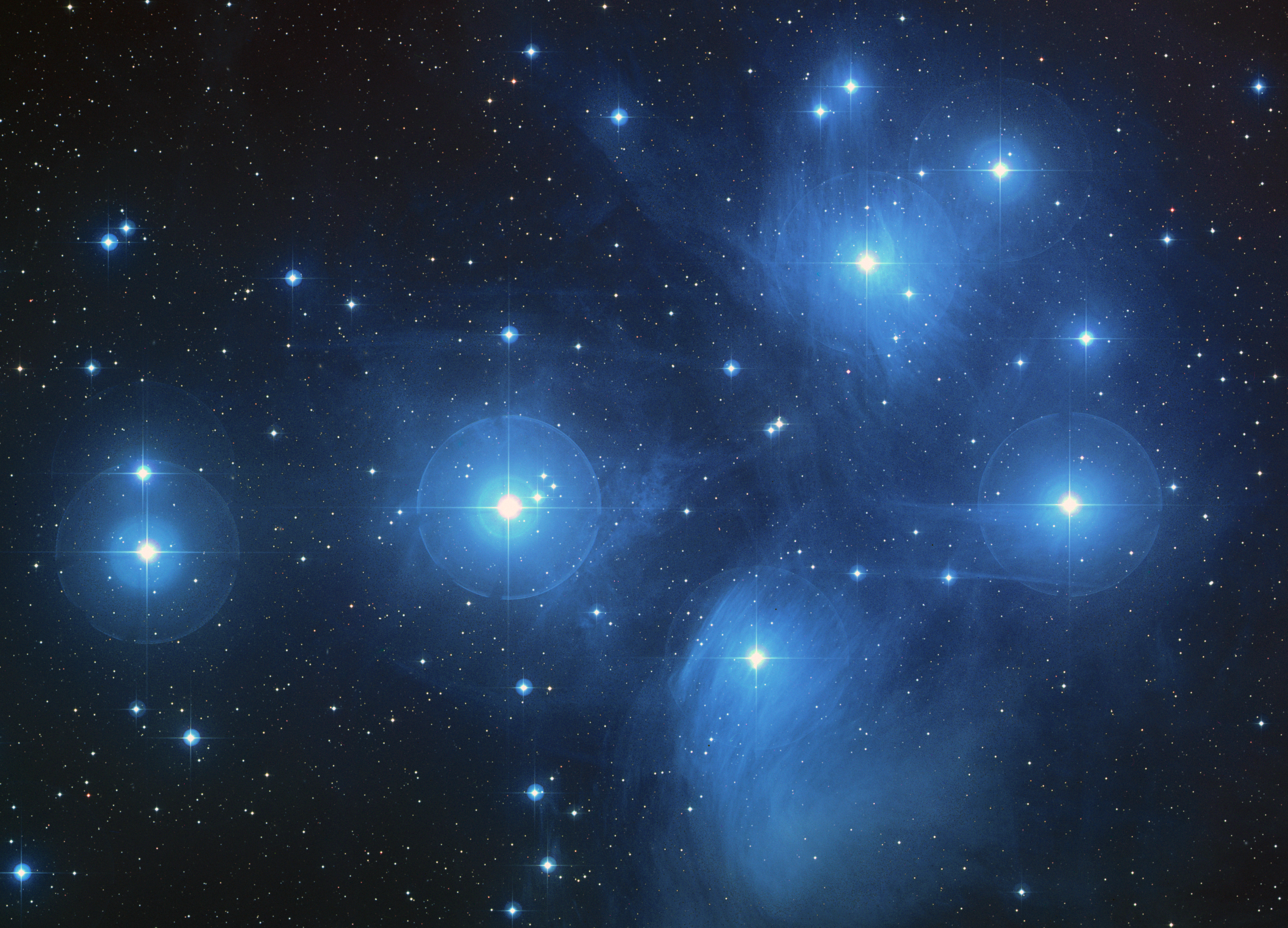
God from God, Light from Light, true God from true God, begotten, not made; of the same essence as the Father. — Nicene Creed

The eternal generation of the Son is a Trinitarian doctrine, which is defined as a necessary and eternal act of God the Father, in which he generates (or begets) God the Son through communicating the whole divine essence to the Son. Generation is not defined as an act of the will, but is by necessity of nature. To avoid anthropomorphistic understandings of the doctrine, theologians have defined it as timeless, non-bodily, incomprehensible and not as a communication without but within the Godhead. The view is affirmed by the Roman Catholic Church, Eastern Orthodoxy and Protestantism (c.f. the Westminster Confession, the London Baptist Confession and the Lutheran confessions).

The doctrine has been an important part of Nicene Trinitarianism; however, some modern theologians have proposed different models of the Trinity, wherein eternal generation is no longer seen as necessary and thus rejected. This is associated with the belief doctrine of the temporal Sonship of Christ, instead of being eternally the Son of God.

== History ==
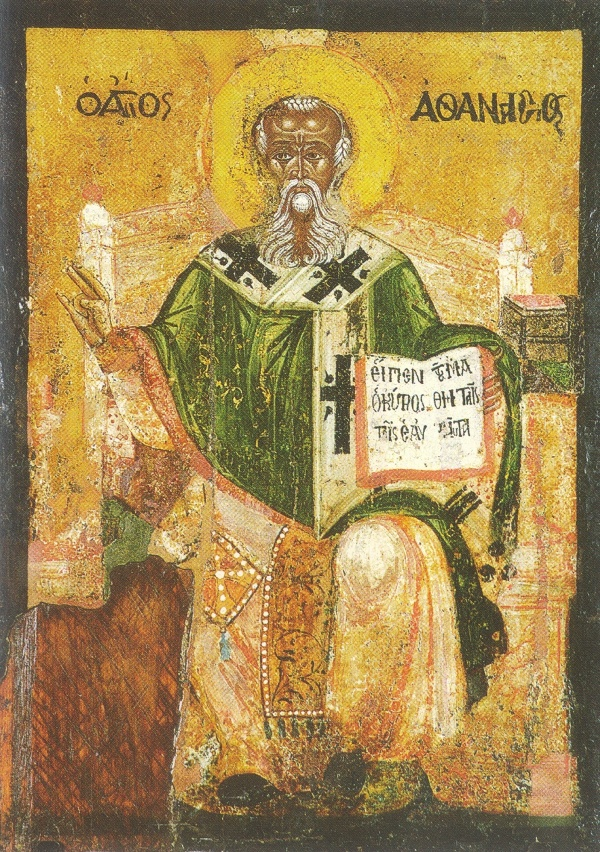
Athanasius of Alexandria was traditionally thought to be the author of the Athanasian Creed, and gives his name to its common title. This creed famously affirmed eternal generation.

The doctrine of eternal generation has been affirmed by the Athanasian creed, the Nicene creed (325ad) and by church fathers such as Athanasius of Alexandria (298 – 2 May 373), Augustine (354 – 28 August 430), Hilary of Poitiers (310 – c. 367), Basil of Caesarea (330 – 1 or 2 January 379) being mentioned explicitly first by Origen of Alexandria (185 – 253). The idea of relational origins within the Trinity also existed in the writings of Tertullian (155–220). However, in stark contrast to the doctrine of eternal generation, Tertullian viewed the generation of the Son of God as a temporal event, thus arguing that the Son became a distinct person in the Trinity only after the begetting of the Son in time. A similar perspective was held by Hippolytus (170–235), who, despite affirming the eternity of the divine essence shared by the persons of the Trinity, did not regard the Son’s personal existence as eternal.

The eternal generation of the Son was rejected by Arius (256 – 336), who instead argued that God is an eternal monad who created the Son in time, arguing that the Son was not of the same essence as the Father. However, Alexander of Alexandria (died 326) drew arguments from the doctrine of eternal generation to critique the claims of the Arians. Alexander argued against Arius, stating that without an eternal Son, there could also be no eternal Father.

Often wrongly cited is the claim that the Reformer John Calvin (1509 – 1564) denied the doctrine of eternal generation. However, he nevertheless rejected the idea that eternal generation should be understood as a communication of the essence. However, most Reformed theologians have not followed Calvin's view of eternal generation.

The doctrine was often disputed by the non-trinitarian Socinians, arguing that the sonship of Christ is not derived from his eternal begetting. Eternal Generation was also rejected by the antitrinitarian Michael Servetus (1509 or 1511), who was burned at the stake for his views on the trinity. The view has also been disputed by some modern theologians, including a number of Social Trinitarians, such as William Lane Craig. Other trinitarian theologians to have criticized the view include Charles Ryrie, John MacArthur (although later recanting of his position) and J. Oliver Buswell among others. The doctrine was also disputed by the popular Evangelical theologian Wayne Grudem, arguing that the doctrine is derived from a misunderstanding of the Greek word monogenes ('μονογενής'). However, he later recanted of his opposition to the doctrine of eternal generation.

Eternal Generation has been affirmed by the Roman Catholic Church, Eastern Orthodoxy, Presbyterians as is evident in the Westminster Confession, Lutherans, Reformed Baptists, some Plymouth Brethren, some Southern Baptists, other Dispensational theologians such as Lewis Sperry Chafer, and some Independent Baptists such as Rolland D. McCune among others.

== Scripture ==
Those who teach the traditional doctrine of eternal generation have often used texts such as Proverbs 8:23, Psalm 2:7, Micah 5:2, John 5:26, John 1:18, 3:16, Colossians 1:15, 2 Corinthians 4:4 and Hebrews 1:3. The ideas of 'image' and 'radiance' expressed in these texts have been argued to imply the idea of generation. Additionally, the idea of being 'begotten' in Psalm 2:7 and John 3:16 has been applied by theologians to support eternal begetting or generation. The text of John 5:26 is one of the most central texts used to defend the idea of eternal generation, which references the Son being granted to have 'life in himself' by the Father. However, the idea that these texts teach the doctrine of eternal generation has been disputed by its critics. The critics of the theory such as William Lane Craig have argued that it introduces subordinationism into the Godhead. A major issue in the debate is the translation of the Greek term monogenes, translated as 'only begotten'. Those who hold to eternal generation generally argue the word to involve an idea of derivation or begetting, while its critics have denied that the word has such connotations.

Critics of eternal generation often argue that interpreting Jesus as the eternal Son of God is a mistake, arguing that Jesus is only the Son of God due to the incarnation.

== Characteristics ==
In his Reformed Dogmatics, 19th-century Dutch Reformed theologian Herman Bavinck presages an enumeration of the characteristics of the eternal generation of the Son by emphasising the classical attribution of 'life' to God, stating that he is not an 'abstract, fixed, monadic, solitary substance, but a plenitude of life'. This is rooted in the Biblical attribution of generation in a fatherly sense to God, for example, For as the Father hath life in himself; so hath he given to the Son to have life in himself (John 5:26). In addition, the Son bears names that denote this relation to the Father, including firstborn, only-begotten and image ('χαρακτηρ') as in Hebrews 1:3, in which the Son is said to be the express image of God's person. Thus while Bavinck is cautious not to associate the imperfection and sensuality of earthly generation with the eternal generation of the Son, he nevertheless asserts the relevance of the analogy to the divine being.

God's fecundity is a beautiful theme, one that frequently recurs in the church fathers. God is no abstract, fixed, monadic, solitary substance, but a plenitude of life. It is his nature (οὐσια) to be generative (γεννητικη) and fruitful (καρπογονος). It is capable of expansion, unfolding, and communication. Those who deny this fecund productivity fail to take seriously the fact that God is an infinite fullness of blessed life. All such people have left is an abstract deistic concept of God, or to compensate for this sterility, in pantheistic fashion they include the life of the world in the divine being. Apart from the Trinity even the act of creation becomes inconceivable. For if God cannot communicate himself, he is a darkened light, a dry spring, unable to exert himself outward to communicate himself to creatures.

Given this emphasis on the 'life' of God, Bavinck enumerates three major characteristics of the eternal generation which are characteristic of Nicene orthodoxy, in contrast to Arianism which the Nicene Creed opposes.

1. The generation of the Son is spiritual. That is, it is simple, without division, separation or flux. God expresses himself completely in the person of the Logos, the express image of his person (Hebrews 1:3). A common analogy of eternal generation is human speech; as human thought is expressed in speech, so God expresses his being in the Logos (which means 'speech', 'word' or 'reason'). Yet it is an imperfect analogy, since the expression of God's being in the Son is total and indivisible, For as the Father hath life in himself; so hath he given to the Son to have life in himself (John 5:26). The Arians, in contrast, alleged that generation necessitates separation, division and passion, such that the Son cannot be consubstantial with the Father.
2. The Father generates the Son out of the very same being of the Father. As it states in the Nicene Creed, 'God from God, Light from Light, true God from true God, begotten, not made; of the same essence as the Father.' The Son was not created by the Father, rather he was generated out of the Father's being in eternity. Generation is thus not so much a work of the Father, but the very nature of the Father, in harmony with his knowledge, will and power as a perfect expression of his being. In this sense it can be said that Christ is over all, God blessed for ever (Romans 9:5). In Arianism, the Son is not generated but created by the Father out of nothing, which means that he is a creature.
3. The generation is eternal.If the Son does not eternally possess his sonship—that is, his generation from the Father—then the Father cannot be eternal either. The Father’s identity as Father logically requires the eternal existence of the Son as Son. To deny the Son’s eternal generation would imply that there was a time when the Father was not yet Father, but became so only after bringing forth the Son, which contradicts the idea of God’s unchanging and eternal nature. Accordingly, generation is understood as an eternal act within God, continuously occurring as part of the Father’s nature. The Son is therefore eternally begotten. In contrast, Arianism teaches that the Son did not always exist and was instead created or brought into being at a particular point in time.

== See also ==
- Eternal procession of the Holy Spirit
- Eternal functional subordination
