= Social trinitarianism =

Interpretation of the Trinity

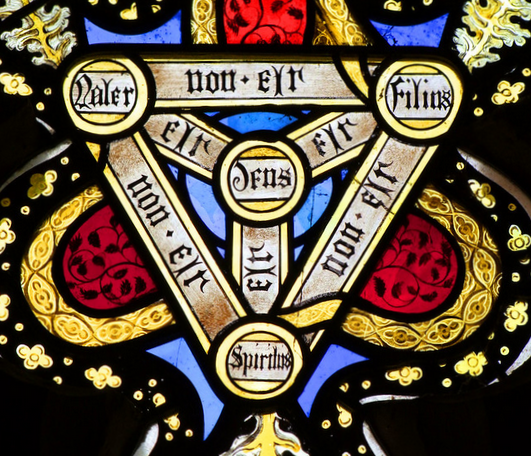
The trinity depicted in stained glass

Social trinitarianism is a Christian interpretation of the Trinity as consisting of three persons, each person having their own center of consciousness. These persons are united in a loving relationship, which reflects a model for human relationships. The teaching emphasizes that God is an inherently social being. Human unity approaches conformity to the image of God's unity through self-giving, empathy, adoration for one another, etc. Such love is a fitting ethical likeness to God but is in stark contrast to God's unity of being. Those who are often associated with this term include Jürgen Moltmann, Miroslav Volf, Elizabeth Johnson, Leonardo Boff, John Zizioulas, William Lane Craig and Catherine LaCugna.

Social trinitarianism is often in contrast to Nicene trinitarianism, as social trinitarianism generally denies the trinity being defined primarily by the eternal relations of origin.

== Distinction from Nicene trinitarianism ==
Some forms of social trinitarianism are opposed to Nicene Christianity in that they see the Trinity as composed of three distinct wills that voluntarily submit to one another, similarly to subordinationism.

Matthew Barret defines social trinitarianism thus:

Social trinitarianism is a diverse movement, which makes it difficult to define. But in its fully developed form, its starting point (or at least emphasis) is not simplicity—some reject simplicity—but the three persons. The Trinity is not defined primarily by eternal relations of origin. ST redefines the Trinity as a society and community analogous to a human society, redefines the persons as three centers of consciousness/will, redefines persons according to their relationships (focus on mutuality, societal interaction), and redefines unity as interpersonal relationships of love between persons (redefinition of perichoresis). ST collapses immanent and economic Trinity, sets East against West, and treats social Trinity as a paradigm for social theory (ecclesiology, politics, gender). ST has been adopted by modern theologians but is an abandonment/revision of Nicene orthodoxy.

By confessing that the Son is of the same essence as the Father (in other words, coessential and coeternal with the Father), the Nicene Creed defines the Trinity by 'eternal relations of origin', such as the eternal generation of the Son. The Son is not subordinate to the Father, nor is their relationship analogous to a human society in which the Son submits to the Father. This, along with subordinationism, are impossible in Nicene orthodoxy because all three persons of the Trinity are considered to be images of the very same being and will of God: thus, there is no will of the Son to submit to the Father, but rather one will which is threefold in image.

== Three persons ==
Orthodox Christian theology asserts that the one God exists in three 'persons' (this term was generally used in the Latin West). Social trinitarian thought argues that the three persons are each distinct realities—this was generally presented in the East with the Greek term 'hypostasis' from the First Council of Nicaea onward. Hypostasis was here employed to denote a specific individual instance of being. So, the Trinity is composed of three distinct 'persons' or 'hypostases' which are in integral relation with one another. The Cappadocian Fathers outlined the traditional set of doctrines describing the relational character of the Trinity: the Father is the Father by virtue of begetting the Son; likewise the Son is the Son precisely by being begotten. These two hypostases do not have their identity first as individual entities that then relate; rather, they are what they are precisely due to their relations. John Zizioulas is perhaps the best-known contemporary proponent of this emphasis in trinitarian theology, which he labels relational ontology.

Many proponents of the social trinitarianism, including John Zizioulas, criticize modern individualism by mapping human relationships onto this relational ontology as well. This suggests that the individual is not constituted over and against other persons. On the contrary, say these proponents, a person's identity and self are deeply constituted by their relationships, such that a person could not be the same person were it not for the relationship - the relationship, in some sense at least, precedes (ontologically, though not necessarily temporally) the person rather than the person preceding the relationship.

== One essence ==
The three persons of the Trinity must not be confused as three distinct gods, an error that the name 'Trinity' itself was developed to combat: Tri-unity (as first outlined by Tertullian). All three persons/hypostases have one divine nature: their essence ("ousia" in Greek). It was in the development of the Trinity that the Greek terms ousia and hypostasis were fully separated; before the First Council of Nicaea, they had often been used interchangeably. Social trinitarian thought argues that this one essence can be thought of as the loving relationship between Father, Son, and Spirit. This relationship can be analogized to human loving relationships; however, as mentioned above, it is a complete unity—it does not arise from the three hypostases but is intimately involved in their very ontological constitution. The idea of perichoresis of the persons of the trinity has been cited to provide at least part of this greater unity.

Though the Cappadocians, for example, tended to begin with the three persons and from there develop the sense of unity, while Augustine of Hippo more or less began, drawing from the Latin tradition of Tertullian, with the unity and then developed the three distinct persons (along a psychological metaphor), neither the Eastern nor the Western traditions actually see either the 3 or the 1 as ontologically prior to the other: the three are always united in and constituted by the one; the one is always expressed in the three.

== Eternal generation and procession ==
The early Christian councils taught that the persons of the Trinity are distinguished by their eternal relations of origin: the Son as eternally begotten before all creation, and the Holy Spirit as proceeding. This doctrine is known as the eternal generation of the Son. Some forms of social trinitarianism set aside the doctrine of eternal generation (though it does not necessarily exclude it) and instead propose that God has eternally existed as three distinct persons, each with their own center of cognitive faculties, without relations of begetting and procession. William Lane Craig argues that Jesus was not begotten Son of God from all eternity, but only became such in the incarnation.

== The Incarnation of Christ ==
According to William Lane Craig, who identifies as a "vigorous social trinitarian", all three persons are to be distinguished by having their own centers of consciousness and will. This leads him to teach the doctrine of Monothelitism, as he views will as an attribute of hypostasis instead of nature. Craig has offered his own version of Christology, where he argues that Jesus did not assume a human rational soul in the incarnation, but the rational soul of Jesus was instead the Logos, thus teaching that the will and rationality of Christ was divine. This is similar to the teaching of Apollinarius, whose Christology was condemned as a heresy by the First council of Constantinople. However, he sought to revise the doctrines of Apollinarus by arguing that Christ in eternity already possessed those properties necessary for human personality in archetypal form.

== See also ==
- Trinity
- First Council of Nicaea
- Council of Chalcedon
- Cappadocian Fathers
- John Zizioulas
- Perichoresis
