= Eternal procession of the Holy Spirit =

Christian theological concept

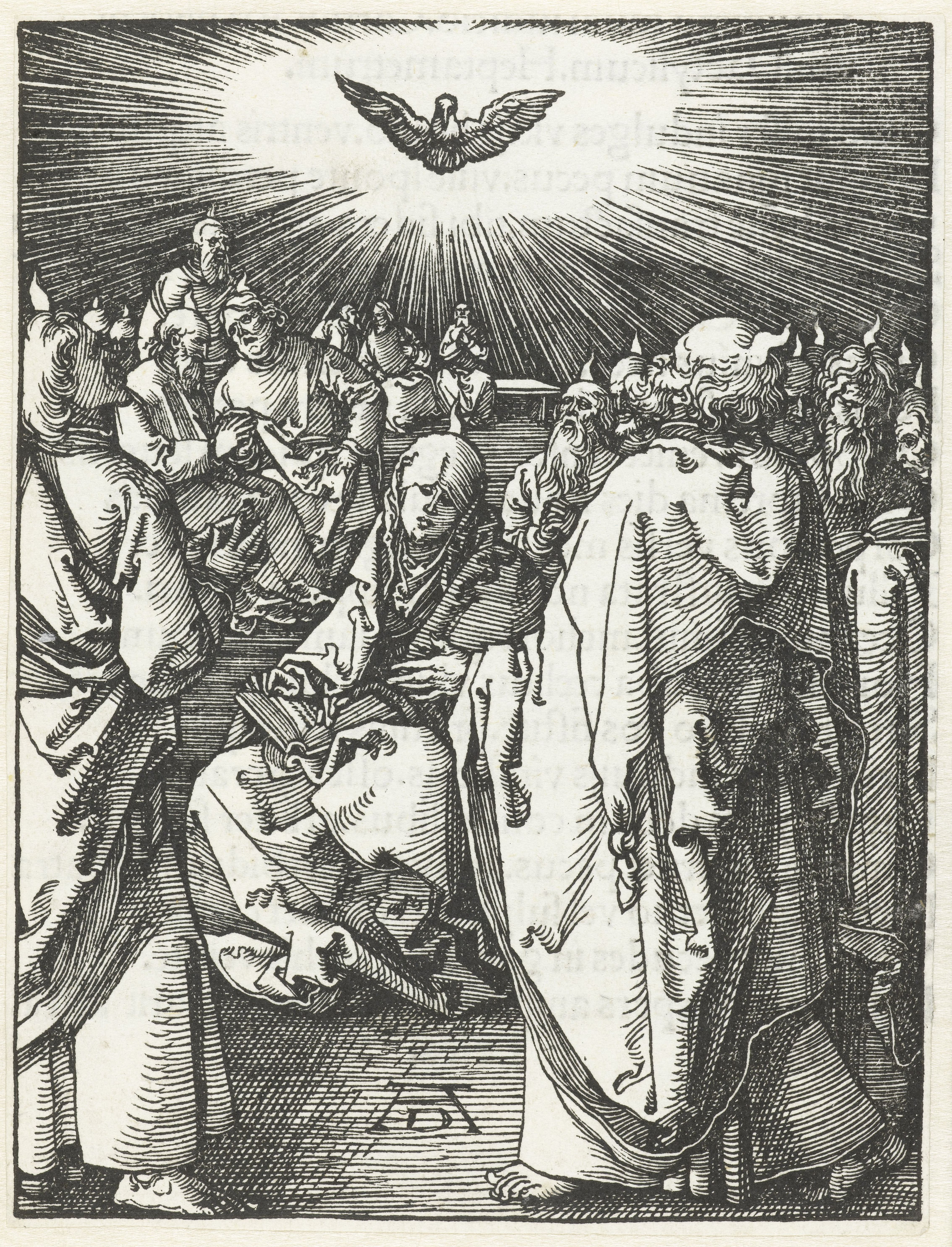
A woodcut by Albrecht Dürer depicting the descent of the Holy Spirit

The eternal procession of the Holy Spirit is a concept in Christian theology, partially affirmed in the Niceno-Constantinopolitan Creed of 381, that describes the relationship of the Holy Spirit to the other persons of the Trinity. It is related to the doctrine of the eternal generation of the Son; but in Christian theology procession (or spiration) is viewed as being mysteriously different from generation in order to distinguish the Holy Spirit from the Son.

When the Paraclete comes, whom I will send to you from the Father—the Spirit of truth Who goes out from the Father—He will testify about me.

— John 15:26

In Western Christianity, the Holy Spirit is believed to proceed from the Father and the Son. This is in contrast to the Eastern churches, which believe that the Holy Spirit proceeds only from the Father. This issue led to the filioque controversy and was a large question in the East-West schism.

== Terminology ==
In a theological context, the word "procession" (from the Latin procedere, "to go forth" or "to issue from") describes origin and relationship, and not physical movement as in the ordinary meaning of the word "procession" in the sense of a parade.

Thomas Aquinas explained this distinction in his Summa Theologiae: "Procession, therefore, is not to be understood from what it is in bodies, either according to local movement or by way of a cause proceeding forth to its exterior effect, as, for instance, like heat from the agent to the thing made hot. Rather it is to be understood by way of an intelligible emanation, for example, of the intelligible word which proceeds from the speaker, yet remains in him."

== Scripture ==
The doctrine of the eternal procession of the Holy Spirit is a corollary doctrine which flows from the eternal generation of the Son (which is based on texts such as Proverbs 8:25, Psalm 2:7, Hebrews 1:3-5, and John 1:18). However, other texts such as John 15:26 have been argued to explicitly refer to the eternal procession of the Holy Spirit, as it states that the Holy Spirit "proceeds" from the Father. Thus, unbegottenness is viewed as the unique personal property of the Father, begottenness as the unique personal property of the Son and spiration as the unique personal property of the Holy Spirit.

The Western Church also contended that passages like Galatians 4:6 and Romans 8:9, which describe the Holy Spirit as the "Spirit of his Son" or the "Spirit of Christ," imply that the Holy Spirit also proceeds from the Son. Eastern Orthodox theologians dispute this view.

== Modern views ==
Eternal procession (alongside generation) has been critiqued by some modern theologians as being based upon weak texts, instead arguing that John 15:26 should be understood as the coming of the Holy Spirit on Pentecost and not an eternal procession. Those who hold to the Nicene view of procession argue that because John 15:26 uses the present tense instead of the future tense, it is unlikely a reference to Pentecost.

The doctrine of the eternal procession of the Holy Spirit (alongside the eternal generation of the Son) is also denied by some social trinitarians, such as William Lane Craig.
