= The Brazen Serpent =

The Brazen Serpent may refer to one of these paintings showing a scene from the Old Testament (Numbers 21: 6–9):

- The Brazen Serpent (Rubens) - 1635 and 1640 painting by Peter Paul Rubens
- The Brazen Serpent (Leonardo) - 1630-1640 painting by the Aragonese artist Jusepe Leonardo
- The Brazen Serpent (van Dyck) - 1618-1620 painting by the Flemish artist Anthony van Dyck
- The Brazen Serpent (Bruni) - 1841 painting by Russian artist Fyodor Bruni
