= The Heavenly and Earthly Trinities =

Painting by Bartolomé Esteban Murillo

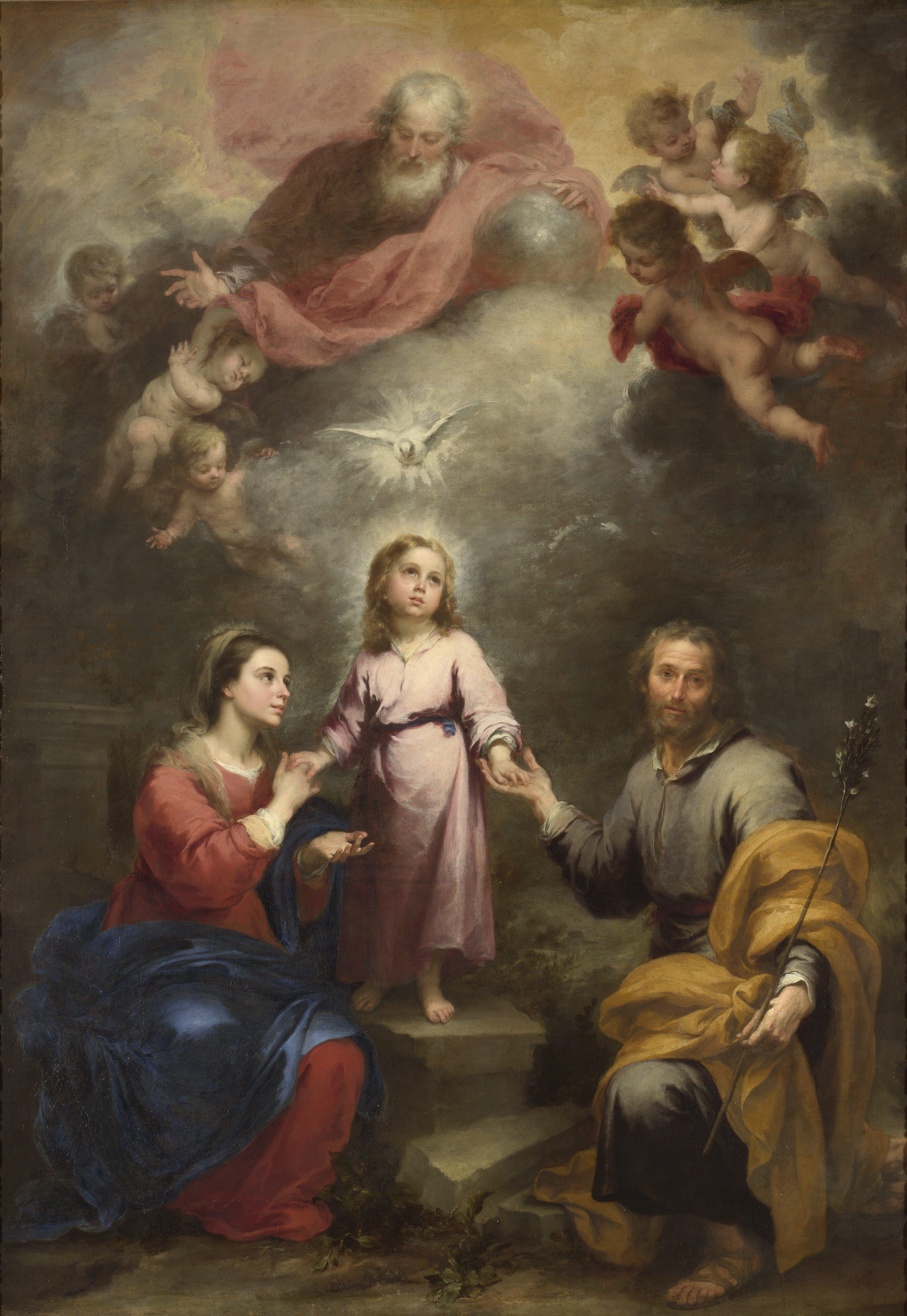
- Artist: Bartolomé Esteban Murillo
- Year: c. 1675–1682
- Medium: Oil on canvas
- Dimensions: 293 cm × 207 cm (115 in × 81 in)
- Location: National Gallery, London
- Accession: NG13

The Heavenly and Earthly Trinities (also known as The Two Trinities or The Pedroso Holy Family) is an oil painting on canvas of c. 1675–1682 by the Spanish artist Bartolomé Esteban Murillo in the National Gallery, London. It depicts a young Jesus with the Virgin Mary and Saint Joseph (the three of whom make up the Holy Family, the earthly trinity of the painting's title), together with God the Father and the Holy Spirit (who with Christ as God the Son form the Holy Trinity). The subject, inspired by the Finding in the Temple, is rare, though it does appear elsewhere in Spanish and Flemish art.

== Provenance ==
The work first appears in the written record in a mention by Antonio Palomino, Murillo's main biographer, who saw it in Cádiz in 1708 in the art collection of Carlos Francisco Colarte, Marquess of Pedroso. It was still in the Pedroso family collection early in the 19th century and was acquired in Seville by James Campbell for the British art dealer William Buchanan; it arrived in Britain in January 1810. It was then acquired by Thomas Bulkeley Bulkeley-Owen, before being bought by its present owner with Peter Paul Rubens's Brazen Serpent in 1837.
