= Trinity =

Christian doctrine

A Shield of the Trinity diagram, illustrating relationships between the Father, the Son, and the Holy Spirit

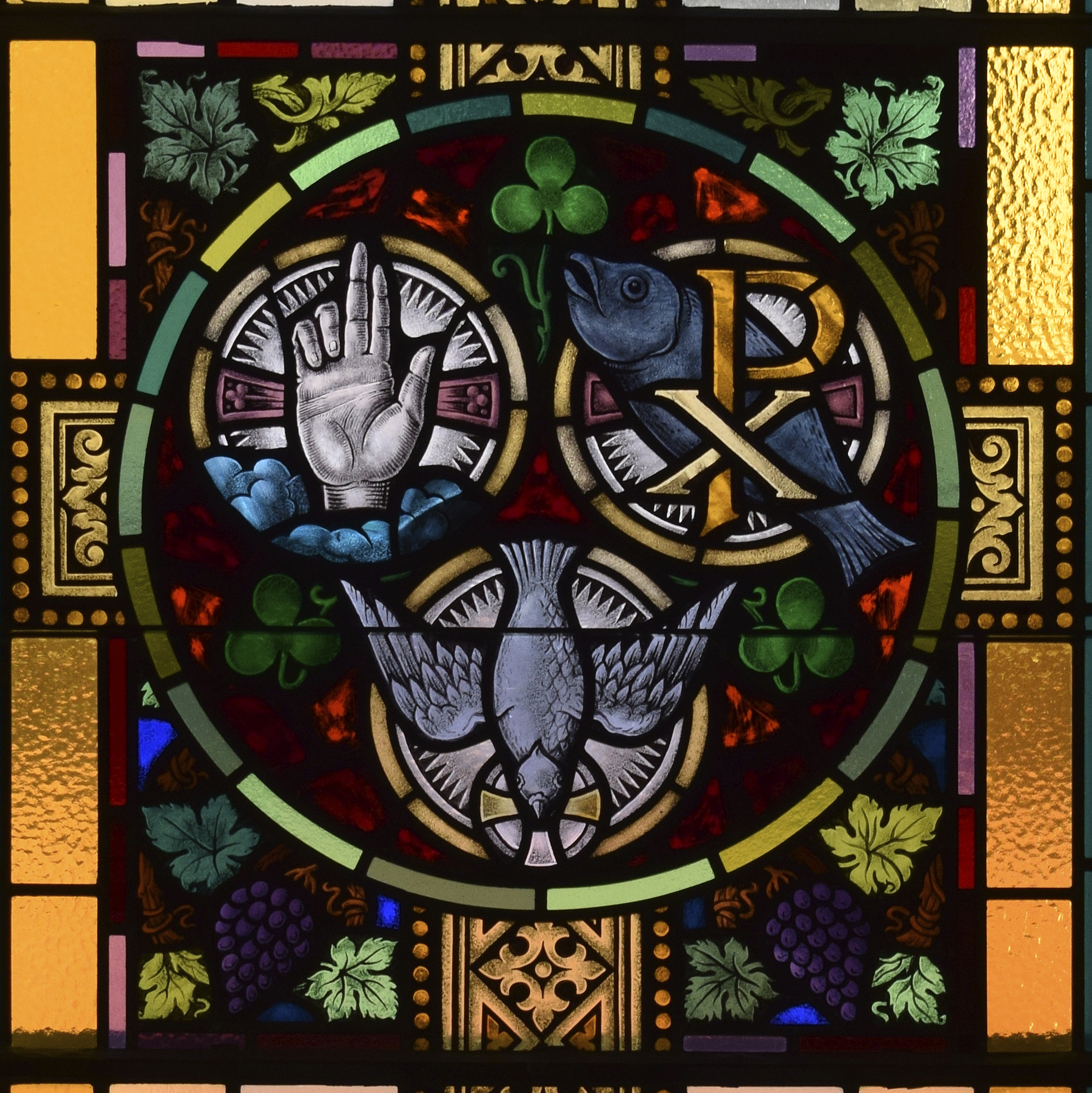
An artistic depiction of the Trinity, with the hand representing the Father, the Chi Rho and ichthys representing the Son, and the dove representing the Holy Spirit

The Trinity (Latin: Trinitas, lit. 'triad', from trinus 'threefold') is a Christian doctrine concerning the nature of God. It defines one God as existing in three divine persons: God the Father, God the Son (Jesus Christ), and God the Holy Spirit. They are considered to be coeternal and consubstantial, constituting three distinct persons (hypostases) that share one essence/substance/nature (homoousion).

The Fourth Lateran Council, an ecumenical council held by the Catholic Church in 1215 AD, declared that the Father begets, the Son is begotten, and the Holy Spirit proceeds. In this context, the single essence/nature defines what God is, while the three persons define who God is. The doctrine expresses both a distinction between, and an indissoluble unity of, the three personages. The process of creation and grace is viewed as a single shared action of the three divine persons, who each manifest their unique attributes. This is expressed in the statements that everything is "from the Father", "through the Son", and "in the Holy Spirit".

The doctrine is called Trinitarianism, and its adherents are Trinitarians. Most major Christian denominations today are Trinitarian. Its opponents are called nontrinitarians (or antitrinitarians), who are considered heretical non-Christians by many Trinitarians. Nontrinitarian positions include Unitarianism, binitarianism and modalism. The theological study of the Trinity is called triadology or Trinitarian theology.

The Trinity was developed by the early Christians (late-2nd century AD onwards) and fathers of the Church, to describe the relationship between Jesus and God in their scriptures and prior traditions. The doctrine was firmly established by the 4th century First Council of Nicaea and First Council of Constantinople, which made it an integral part of the creed. According to James W. Barker and C. Kavin Rowe there is support for Trinitarianism in the Bible, particularly the New Testament books of the Pauline epistles and the Gospels. These present an implicitly triadic understanding of God and contain several Trinitarian formulas.

== Old Testament ==
The Old Testament has been interpreted as referring to the Trinity in several places. For example, in the Genesis creation narrative, the first-person plural pronouns in Genesis 1:26–27 and Genesis 3:22 have been used to argue for a Trinitarian understanding of God:

Then God said, 'Let us make man in our image, after our likeness [...]'

— Genesis 1:26

Then the LORD God said, 'Behold, the man has become like one of us in knowing good and evil [...]'

— Genesis 3:22

A traditional Christian interpretation of these pronouns is that they refer to a plurality of persons within the Godhead. Biblical commentator Victor P. Hamilton outlines several interpretations, including the most widely held among Biblical scholars, which is that the pronouns do not refer to other persons within the Godhead but to the 'heavenly court' of Isaiah 6. Theologians Meredith Kline and Gerhard von Rad argue for this view; as von Rad says, 'The extraordinary plural ("Let us") is to prevent one from referring God's image too directly to God the Lord. God includes himself among the heavenly beings of his court and thereby conceals himself in this majority.' Hamilton notes that this interpretation assumes that Genesis 1 is at variance with Isaiah 40:13–14, Who has measured the Spirit of the Lord, or what man shows him his counsel? Whom did he consult, and who made him understand? Who taught him the path of justice, and taught him knowledge, and showed him the way of understanding? That is, if the plural pronouns of Genesis 1 teach that God consults and creates with a 'heavenly court', then it contradicts the statement in Isaiah that God seeks the counsel of nobody. According to Hamilton, the best interpretation 'approaches the Trinitarian understanding but employs less direct terminology'. Following D. J. A. Clines, he states that the plural reveals a 'duality within the Godhead' that recalls the 'Spirit of God' mentioned in verse 2, And the Spirit of God was hovering over the face of the waters. Hamilton also says that it is unreasonable to assume that the author of Genesis was too theologically primitive to deal with such a concept as 'plurality within unity'; Hamilton thus argues for a framework of progressive revelation, in which the doctrine of the Trinity is revealed at first obscurely then plainly in the New Testament.

Another of these places is Isaiah 9, where, if interpreted to be about the Messiah, the Messiah is called "Wonderful Counselor, Mighty God, Everlasting Father, Prince of Peace". Some Christians see this verse as meaning the Messiah will represent the Trinity on earth. This is because Counselor is a title for the Holy Spirit (John 14:26), the Trinity is God, Father is a title for God the Father, and Prince of Peace is a title for Jesus. This verse is also used to support the Deity of Christ.

The Deity of Christ can also be inferred from certain passages in the Book of Daniel:

I saw in the night visions, and behold, with the clouds of heaven there came one like a son of man, and he came to the Ancient of Days and was presented before him. And to him was given dominion and glory and a kingdom, that all peoples, nations, and languages should serve him; his dominion is an everlasting dominion, which shall not pass away, and his kingdom one that shall not be destroyed.

— Daniel 7:13–14

This is because both the Ancient of Days (God the Father) and the Son of Man (God the Son, Matt 16:13) have an everlasting dominion, which is ascribed to God in Psalm 145:13.

Some writers also see the Trinity when the Old Testament refers to God's word (Psalm 33:6), God's Spirit (Isaiah 61:1), and Wisdom (Proverbs 9:1), as well as narratives such as the three men who visit Abraham in Genesis 18. The narrative here has the LORD "appearing to Abraham" as he was visited by three men. However, it is generally agreed among Trinitarian Christian scholars that it would go beyond the intention and spirit of the Old Testament to correlate these notions directly with later Trinitarian doctrine.

Some Church Fathers believed that a knowledge of the mystery was granted to the prophets and saints of the Old Testament and that they identified the divine messenger of Genesis 16:7, Genesis 21:17, Genesis 31:11, Exodus 3:2, and Wisdom of the sapiential books with the Son, and "the spirit of the Lord" with the Holy Spirit.

Other Church Fathers, such as Gregory Nazianzen, argued in his Orations that the revelation was gradual, claiming that the Father was proclaimed in the Old Testament openly, but the Son only obscurely, because "it was not safe, when the Godhead of the Father was not yet acknowledged, plainly to proclaim the Son".

In Genesis 19, "two angels" visited Lot at Sodom. The interplay between Abraham, on the one hand, and the Lord, the three men and the two angels, on the other, was an intriguing text for those who believed in a single God in three persons. Justin Martyr and John Calvin similarly interpreted it as such that Abraham was visited by God, who was accompanied by two angels. Justin supposed that the God who visited Abraham was distinguishable from the God who remains in the heavens but was nevertheless identified as the (monotheistic) God. Justin interpreted the God who visited Abraham as Jesus, the second person of the Trinity.

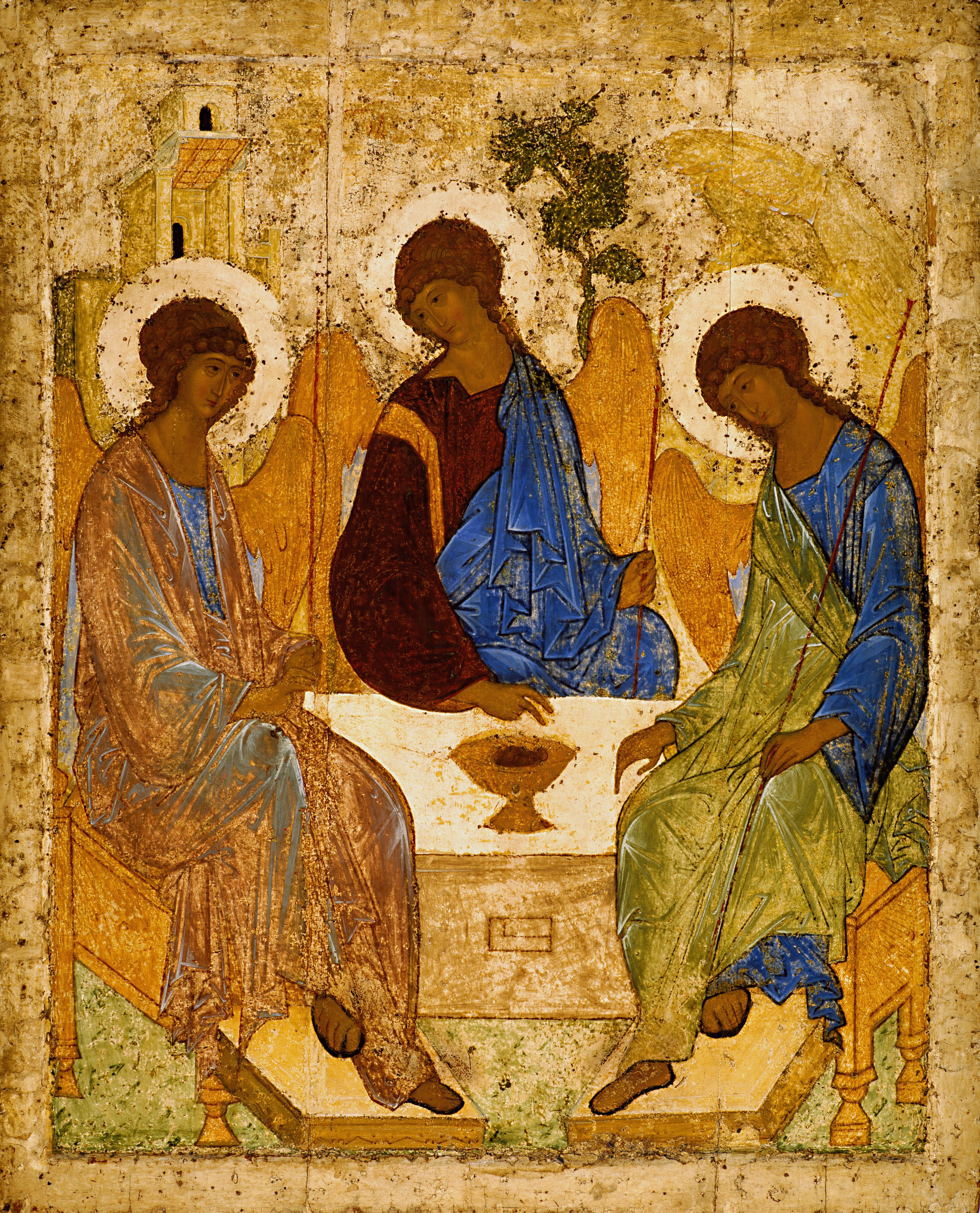
The Trinity by Russian icon painter Andrei Rublev, early 15th century

Augustine, in contrast, held that the three visitors to Abraham were the three persons of the Trinity. He saw no indication that the visitors were unequal, as would be the case in Justin's reading. Then, in Genesis 19, two of the visitors were addressed by Lot in the singular: "Lot said to them, 'Not so, my lord'" (Gen. 19:18). Augustine saw that Lot could address them as one because they had a single substance despite the plurality of persons. (Note: Augustine had poor knowledge of the Greek language, and no knowledge of Hebrew. So he trusted the Septuagint, which differentiates between κύριοι ('lords', vocative plural) and κύριε ('lord', vocative singular), even if the Hebrew verbal form, נא-אדני (na-adoni), is exactly the same in both cases.)

Christians interpret the theophanies, or appearances of the Angel of the Lord, as revelations of a person distinct from God, who is nonetheless called God. This interpretation is found in Christianity as early as Justin Martyr and Melito of Sardis and reflects ideas that were already present in Philo. The Old Testament theophanies were thus seen as Christophanies, each a "preincarnate appearance of the Messiah".

== New Testament ==
James Barker argues that important aspects of Trinitarianism are present in the New Testament, with an economic Trinity being present in the Gospel of John. Harold W. Attridge (Yale Divinity School) and C. K. Barrett note its presence in John, which provided the foundation for the doctrine. According to C. Kavin Rowe, Luke's identification of Jesus with the God of Israel compels a description of Christology in Trinitarian terms. Rowe also finds Trinitarian reasoning in the Epistle to the Hebrews and the Pauline epistles. According to Larry Hurtado, while the developed doctrine of the Trinity is not explicit in its books, the New Testament possesses a triadic understanding of God and several Trinitarian formulas, including Matthew 28:19, 2 Corinthians 13:13, Ephesians 4:4–6, 1 Peter 1:2, and Revelation 1:4–6. Reflection by early Christians on passages such as the Great Commission: "Go therefore and make disciples of all nations, baptizing them in the name of the Father and of the Son and of the Holy Spirit" and Paul the Apostle's blessing: "The grace of the Lord Jesus Christ and the love of God and the fellowship of the Holy Spirit be with you all", lead to attempts to articulate the relationship between the Father, Son, and Holy Spirit.

Eventually, the diverse references to God, Jesus, and the Spirit found in the New Testament were brought together to form the concept of the Trinity—one Godhead subsisting in three persons and one substance. The concept of the Trinity was used to oppose alternative views of how the three are related and to defend the church against charges of worshiping two or three gods.

=== 1 John 5:7 ===
Modern Biblical scholarship largely agrees that 1 John 5:7, which was seen in Latin and Greek texts after the 4th century and found in later translations such as the King James Translation due to its inclusion in the Textus Receptus, cannot be found in the oldest Greek and Latin texts. Verse 7 is known as the Johannine Comma, which most scholars agree to be a later addition by a later copyist or what is termed a textual gloss and not part of the original text. This verse reads:

Because there are three in Heaven that testify—the Father, the Word and the Holy Spirit—and these three are one.

— 1 John 5:7

This verse is absent from the Ethiopic, Aramaic, Syriac, early Slavic, early Armenian, Georgian, and Arabic translations of the Greek New Testament. It is primarily found in Latin manuscripts, although a minority of Greek, late Slavonic, and late Armenian manuscripts contain it.

Perhaps the earliest mention of the Johannine Comma comes from the writings of Cyprian of Carthage (210 - 258ad), although this may have been an allegorical interpretation of the undisputed part of the verse. Nevertheless, the comma was often used in many later Latin-speaking authors such as Priscillian (4th century), Contra Varimadum (5th century), Donation of Constantine (8th), Peter Lombard (12th century), Bernard of Clairvaux (12th century), Thomas Aquinas (13th century) and William of Ockham (14th century), alongside having found its way into the earliest printed editions of the New Testament such as the Complutensian Polyglot and the Textus Receptus in the 16th century, causing the comma to become a part of most Reformation-era vernacular translations.

=== Jesus in the New Testament ===
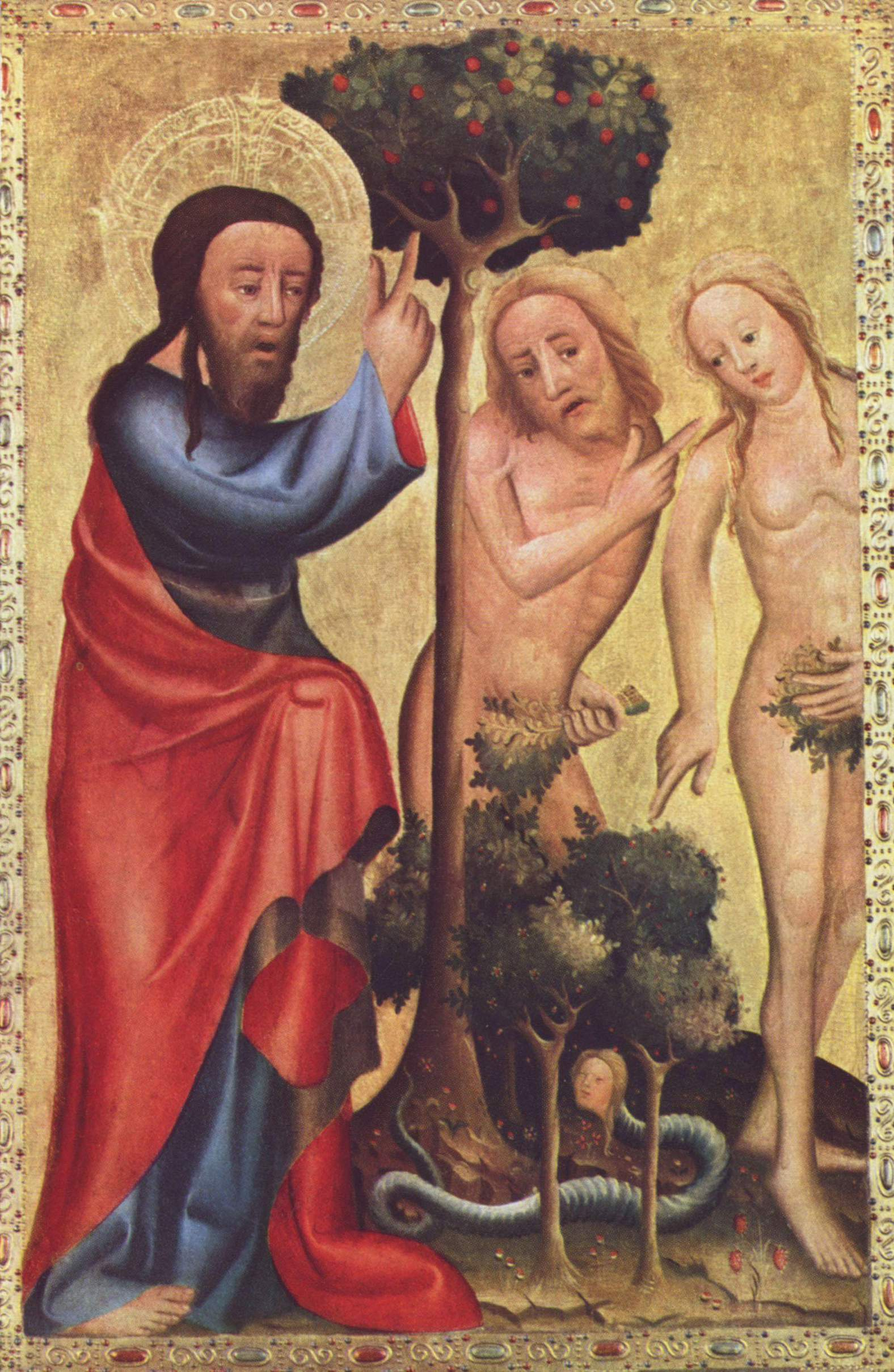
God, in the person of the Son, confronts Adam and Eve, by Master Bertram (d. c. 1415).

From the earliest sources, Paul's letters, Jesus is already considered God's "Son", the "Lord", pre-existent, and linked to the Father and the convictions of Jesus of himself mark the point of origins of Christological views. In the Pauline epistles, the public, collective devotional patterns towards Jesus in the early Christian community are reflective of Paul's perspective on the divine status of Jesus in what scholars have termed a "binitarian" pattern or shape of devotional practice (worship) in the New Testament, in which "God" and Jesus are thematized and invoked. Jesus receives prayer (1 Corinthians 1:2; 2 Corinthians 12:8–9), the presence of Jesus is confessionally invoked by believers (1 Corinthians 16:22; Romans 10:9–13; Philippians 2:10–11), people are baptized in Jesus' name (1 Corinthians 6:11; Romans 6:3), Jesus is the reference in Christian fellowship for a religious ritual meal (the Lord's Supper; 1 Corinthians 11:17–34). Jesus is described as "existing in the very form of God" (Philippians 2:6), and having the "fullness of the Deity [living] in bodily form" (Colossians 2:9). Jesus is also in some verses directly called God (Romans 9:5, Titus 2:13, 2 Peter 1:1).

Many scholars today concede the Synoptic gospels portray Jesus as divine. Jesus is described as forgiving sins, leading some theologians to believe Jesus is portrayed as God. This is because Jesus forgives sins on behalf of others; people normally only forgive transgressions against themselves. The teachers of the law recognized this and said:

Why does this man speak like that? He is blaspheming! Who can forgive sins but God alone?

— Mark 2:7

Jesus also receives προσκύνησις (proskynesis) in the aftermath of the resurrection, a Greek term that either expresses the contemporary social gesture of bowing to a superior, either on one's knees or in full prostration (in Matthew 18:26 a slave performs προσκύνησις to his master so that he would not be sold after being unable to pay his debts). The term can also refer to the religious act of devotion towards a deity. While Jesus receives proskynesis a number of times in the synoptic Gospels, only a few can be said to refer to divine worship.

This includes Matthew 28:16–20, an account of the resurrected Jesus receiving worship from his disciples after proclaiming his authority over the cosmos and his ever-continuing presence with the disciples (forming an inclusion with the beginning of the Gospel, where Jesus is given the name Emmanuel, "God with us", a name that alludes to the God of Israel's ongoing presence with his followers throughout the Old Testament (Genesis 28:15; Deuteronomy 20:1). Whereas some have argued that Matthew 28:19 was an interpolation on account of its absence from the first few centuries of early Christian quotations, scholars largely accept the passage as authentic due to its supporting manuscript evidence and that it does appear to be either quoted in the Didache (7:1–3) or at least reflected in the Didache as part of a common tradition from which both Matthew and the Didache emerged. Jesus receiving divine worship in the post-resurrection accounts is further mirrored in Luke 24:52.

In Acts, it is common for individual Christians to "call" upon the name of Jesus (9:14, 21; 22:16), an idea precedented in the Old Testament descriptions of calling on the name of YHWH as a form of prayer. The story of Stephen depicts Stephen invoking and crying out to Jesus in the final moments of his life to receive his spirit (7:59–60). Acts further describes a common ritual practice of inducting new members into the early Jesus sect by baptizing them in Jesus' name (2:38; 8:16; 10:48; 19:5). According to Dale Allison, Acts depicts the appearances of Jesus to Paul as a divine theophany, styled on and identified with the God responsible for the theophany of Ezekiel in the Old Testament.

The Gospel of John has been seen as especially aimed at emphasizing Jesus' divinity, presenting Jesus as the Logos, pre-existent and divine, from its first words: "In the beginning was the Word, and the Word was with God, and the Word was God" (John 1:1). John features Thomas's declaration that he believed Jesus was God, "My Lord and my God!" (John 20:28). Scholars agree that John 1:1 and John 20:28 identify Jesus with God. However, in a 1973 Journal of Biblical Literature article, Philip B. Harner, Professor Emeritus of Religion at Heidelberg College, claimed that the traditional translation of John 1:1c ("and the Word was God") is incorrect. He endorses the New English Bible translation of John 1:1c, "and what God was, the Word was". However, other scholars have criticized Harner's claim. In the same article, Harner also noted that, "Perhaps the clause could be translated, 'the Word had the same nature as God'. This would be one way of representing John's thought, which is, as I understand it, that [the] logos, no less than [the] theos, had the nature of theos", which in his case means the Word is as fully God as the person called "God". John also portrays Jesus as the agent of creation of the universe.

==== Jesus in later Christian theology ====
Some have suggested that John presents a hierarchy when he quotes Jesus as saying, "The Father is greater than I", a statement which was appealed to by nontrinitarian groups such as Arianism. However, influential theologians such as Augustine of Hippo and Thomas Aquinas argued this statement was to be understood as Jesus speaking about his human nature.

=== Holy Spirit in the New Testament ===
Prior Israelite theology held that the Spirit is merely the divine presence of God himself, whereas orthodox Christian theology holds that the Holy Spirit is a distinct person of God the Father himself. This development begins early in the New Testament, as the Spirit of God receives much more emphasis and description comparably than it had in earlier Jewish writing. Whereas there are 75 references to the Spirit within the Old Testament and 35 identified in the non-biblical Dead Sea Scrolls, the New Testament, despite its significantly shorter length, mentions the Spirit 275 times. In addition to its larger emphasis and importance placed on the Spirit in the New Testament, the Spirit is also described in much more personalized and individualized terms than earlier. Larry Hurtado writes:

Moreover, the New Testament references often portray actions that seem to give the Spirit an intensely personal quality, probably more so than in Old Testament or ancient Jewish texts. So, for example, the Spirit "drove" Jesus into the wilderness (Mk 1:12; compare "led" in Mt. 4:1/Lk 4:1), and Paul refers to the Spirit interceding for believers (Romans 8:26–27) and witnessing to believers about their filial status with God (Romans 8:14–16). To cite other examples of this, in Acts the Spirit alerts Peter to the arrival of visitors from Cornelius (10:19), directs the church in Antioch to send forth Barnabas and Saul (13:2–4), guides the Jerusalem council to a decision about Gentile converts (15:28), at one point forbids Paul to missionize in Asia (16:6), and at another point warns Paul (via prophetic oracles) of trouble ahead in Jerusalem (21:11).

The Holy Spirit is described as God in the book of the Acts of the Apostles:

But Peter said, "Ananias, why has Satan filled your heart to lie to the Holy Spirit and to keep back for yourself part of the proceeds of the land? While it remained unsold, did it not remain your own? And after it was sold, was it not at your disposal? Why is it that you have contrived this deed in your heart? You have not lied to man but to God". Acts 5:3–4

In the New Testament, the Spirit is not portrayed as the recipient of cultic devotion, which, instead, is typically offered to God the Father and to the risen/glorified Jesus. Although what became mainstream Christianity subsequently affirmed the propriety of including the Spirit as the recipient of worship as reflected in the developed form of the Nicene Creed, perhaps the closest to this in the New Testament is in Matthew 28:19 and 2 Corinthians 13:14, which describe the Spirit as the subject of religious ritual.

==== Holy Spirit in later Christian theology ====
As the Arian controversy was dissipating, the debate moved from the deity of Jesus Christ to the equality of the Holy Spirit with the Father and Son. On one hand, the Pneumatomachi sect declared that the Holy Spirit was an inferior person to the Father and Son. On the other hand, the Cappadocian Fathers argued that the Holy Spirit was equal to the Father and Son in nature or substance.

Although the main text used in defense of the deity of the Holy Spirit was Matthew 28:19, the Cappadocian Fathers argued from other verses such as: "By the word of the Lord the heavens were made, and by the breath of his mouth all their host" (Psalm 33:6). According to their understanding, because "breath" and "spirit" in Hebrew are both רוּחַ (ruach), Psalm 33:6 is revealing the roles of the Son and Holy Spirit as co-creators. And since, according to them, because only the holy God can create holy beings such as the angels, the Son and Holy Spirit must be God.

Yet another argument from the Cappadocian Fathers to prove that the Holy Spirit is of the same nature as the Father and Son comes from "For who knows a person's thoughts except the spirit of that person, which is in him? So also no one comprehends the thoughts of God except the Spirit of God" (1 Corinthians 2:11). They reasoned that this passage proves that the Holy Spirit has the same relationship to God as the spirit within us has to us.

The Cappadocian Fathers also quoted, "Do you not know that you are God's temple and that God's Spirit dwells in you?" (1 Corinthians 3:16) and reasoned that it would be blasphemous for an inferior being to take up residence in a temple of God, thus proving that the Holy Spirit is equal with the Father and the Son.

They also combined "the servant does not know what his master is doing" (John 15:15) with 1 Corinthians 2:11 in an attempt to show that the Holy Spirit is not the slave of God and therefore, his equal.

The Pneumatomachi contradicted the Cappadocian Fathers by quoting, "Are they not all ministering spirits sent out to serve for the sake of those who are to inherit salvation?" (Hebrews 1:14) in effect arguing that the Holy Spirit is no different from other created angelic spirits. The Church Fathers disagreed, saying that the Holy Spirit is greater than the angels since the Holy Spirit is the one who grants the foreknowledge for prophecy (1 Corinthians 12:8–10) so that the angels could announce events to come.

== Early Christianity ==
=== Before the Council of Nicaea ===
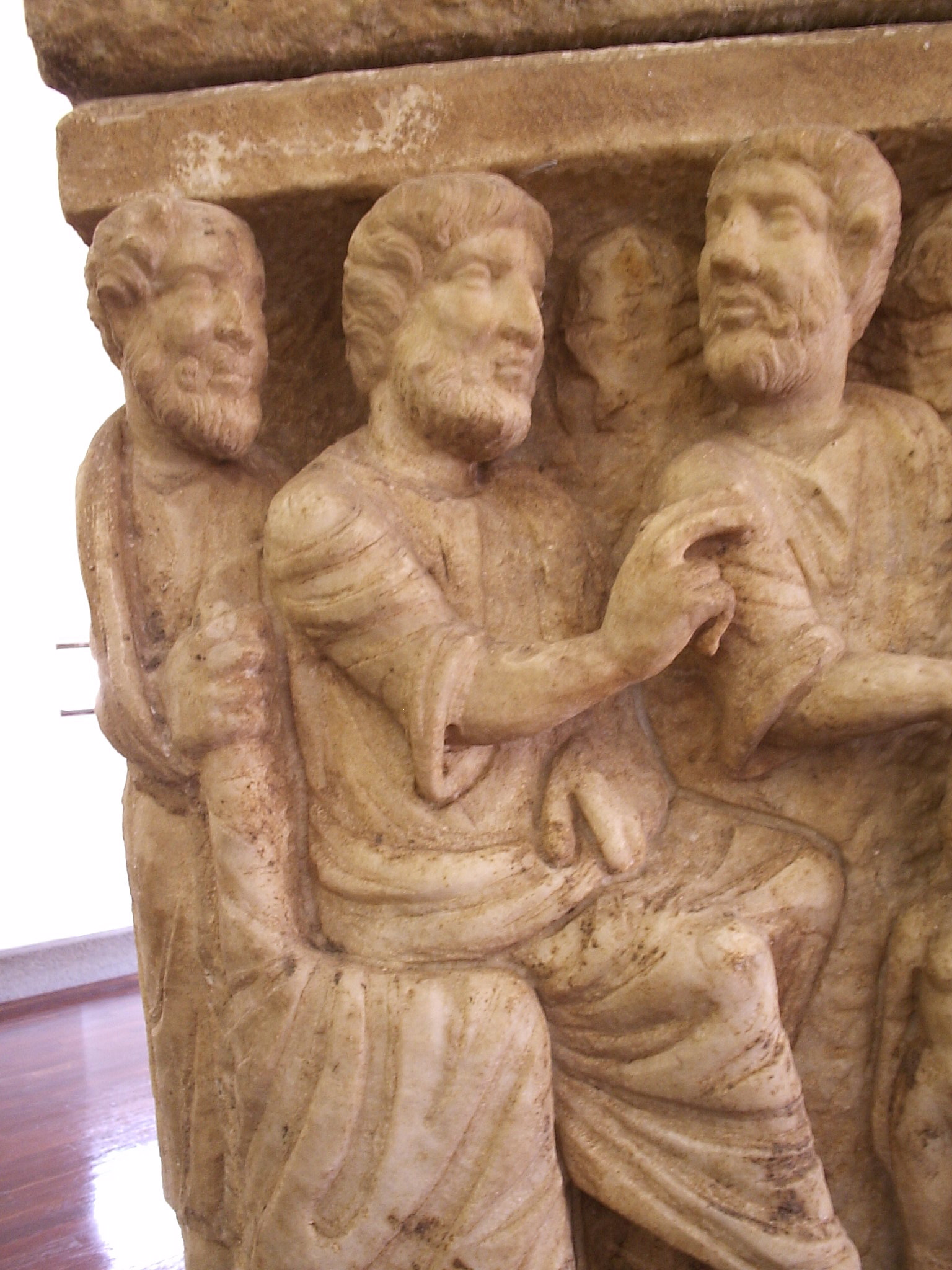
Detail of the earliest known artwork of the Trinity, the Dogmatic or Trinity Sarcophagus, c. 350 (Vatican Museums). Three similar figures, representing the Trinity, are involved in the creation of Eve, whose much smaller figure is cut off at lower right; to her right, Adam lies on the ground.

A further paradox: the theologian claims that the dogma* of the Trinity is found in Scripture; this is not obvious. And in fact the idea of the Trinity, in its present form, took hold gradually, and at the cost of numerous controversies.

— Joseph Wolinski

The Trinity was formulated as early Christians attempted to understand the relationship between Jesus and God in their scriptures and prior traditions. According to Margaret Baker, Trinitarian theology has roots in pre-Christian Palestinian beliefs about angels.

An early reference to the three "persons" of later Trinitarian doctrines appears towards the end of the first century, where Clement of Rome rhetorically asks in his epistle as to why corruption exists among some in the Christian community; "Do we not have one God, and one Christ, and one gracious Spirit that has been poured out upon us, and one calling in Christ?" (1 Clement 46:6). A similar example is found in the first-century Didache, which directs Christians to "baptize in the name of the Father and of the Son and of the Holy Spirit".

Ignatius of Antioch similarly refers to all three persons around AD 110, exhorting obedience to "Christ, and to the Father, and to the Spirit".

The pseudonymous Ascension of Isaiah, written sometime between the end of the first century and the beginning of the third century, possesses a "proto-Trinitarian" view, such as in its narrative of how the inhabitants of the sixth heaven sing praises to "the primal Father and his Beloved Christ, and the Holy Spirit".

Justin Martyr (AD 100 – c. 165) also writes, "in the name of God, the Father and Lord of the universe, and of our Saviour Jesus Christ, and of the Holy Spirit". Justin Martyr is the first to use much of the terminology that would later become widespread in codified Trinitarian theology. For example, he describes that the Son and Father are the same "being" (ousia) and yet are also distinct faces (prosopa), anticipating the three persons (hypostases) that come with Tertullian and later authors. Justin describes how Jesus, the Son, is distinguishable from the Father but also derives from the Father, using the analogy of a fire (representing the Son) that is lit from its source, a torch (representing the Father). At another point, Justin Martyr wrote that "we worship him [Jesus Christ] with reason, since we have learned that he is the Son of the living God himself, and believe him to be in second place and the prophetic Spirit in the third" (1 Apology 13, cf. ch. 60). About the Christian Baptism, he wrote that "in the name of God, the Father and Lord of the universe, and of our Saviour Jesus Christ, and of the Holy Spirit, they then receive the washing with water", highlighting the liturgical use of a Trinitarian formula. Justin Martyr produced a rudimentary version of the Trinitarian doctrine.

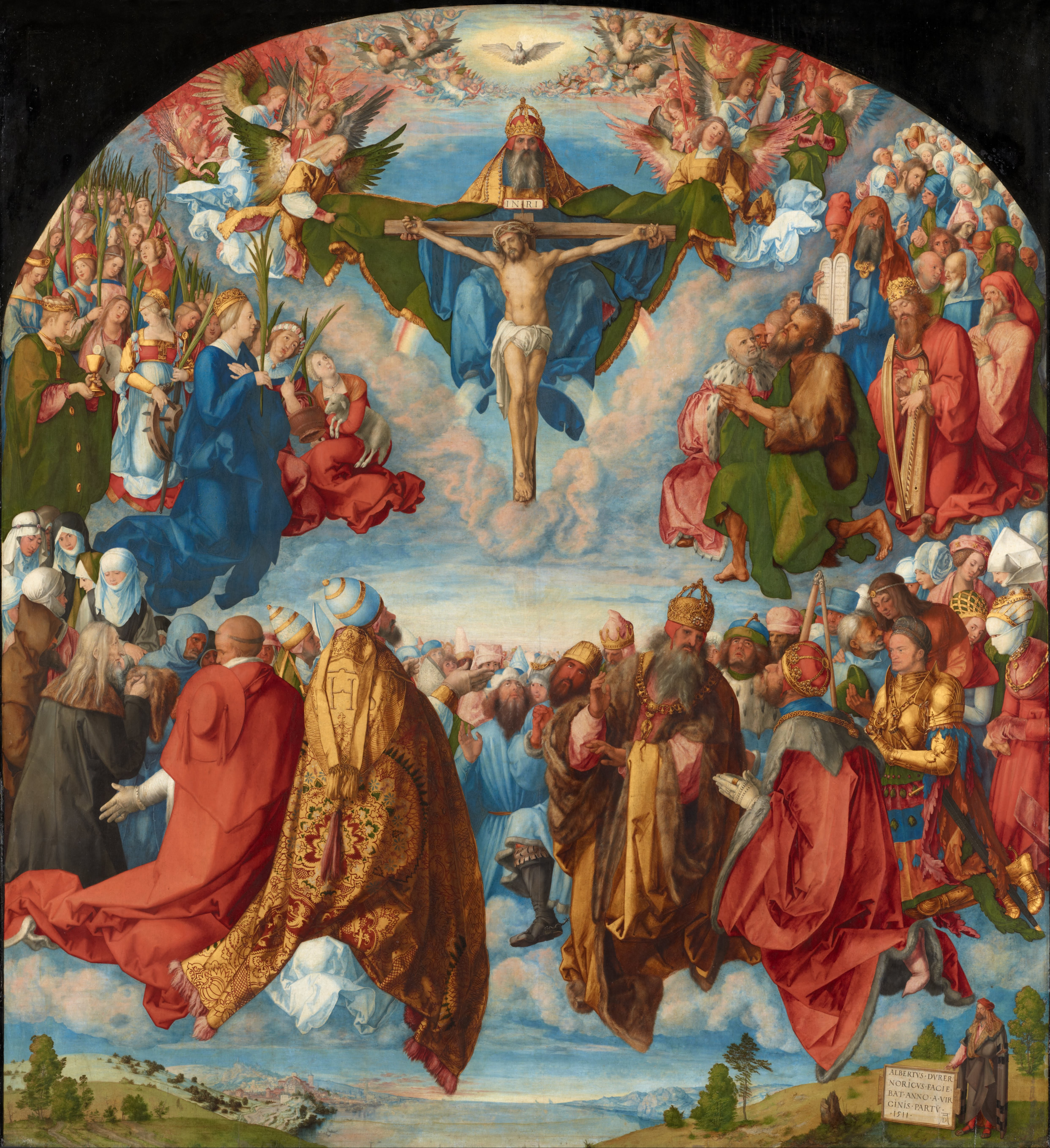
The Adoration of the Trinity by Albrecht Dürer (1511). From top to bottom: Holy Spirit (dove), God the Father and Christ on the cross.

The first of the early Church Fathers to be recorded using the word "Trinity" was Theophilus of Antioch, writing in the late 2nd century. He defines the Trinity as God, his Word (Logos), and his Wisdom (Sophia) in the context of a discussion of the first three days of creation, following the early Christian practice of identifying the Holy Spirit as the Wisdom of God.

The first defense of the doctrine of the Trinity was by Tertullian, who was born around AD 150–160, explicitly "defined" the Trinity as Father, Son, and Holy Spirit and defended his theology against Praxeas, although he noted that the majority of the believers in his day found issue with his doctrine. Tertullian confession, although it implies a Trinity, is binitarian in structure.

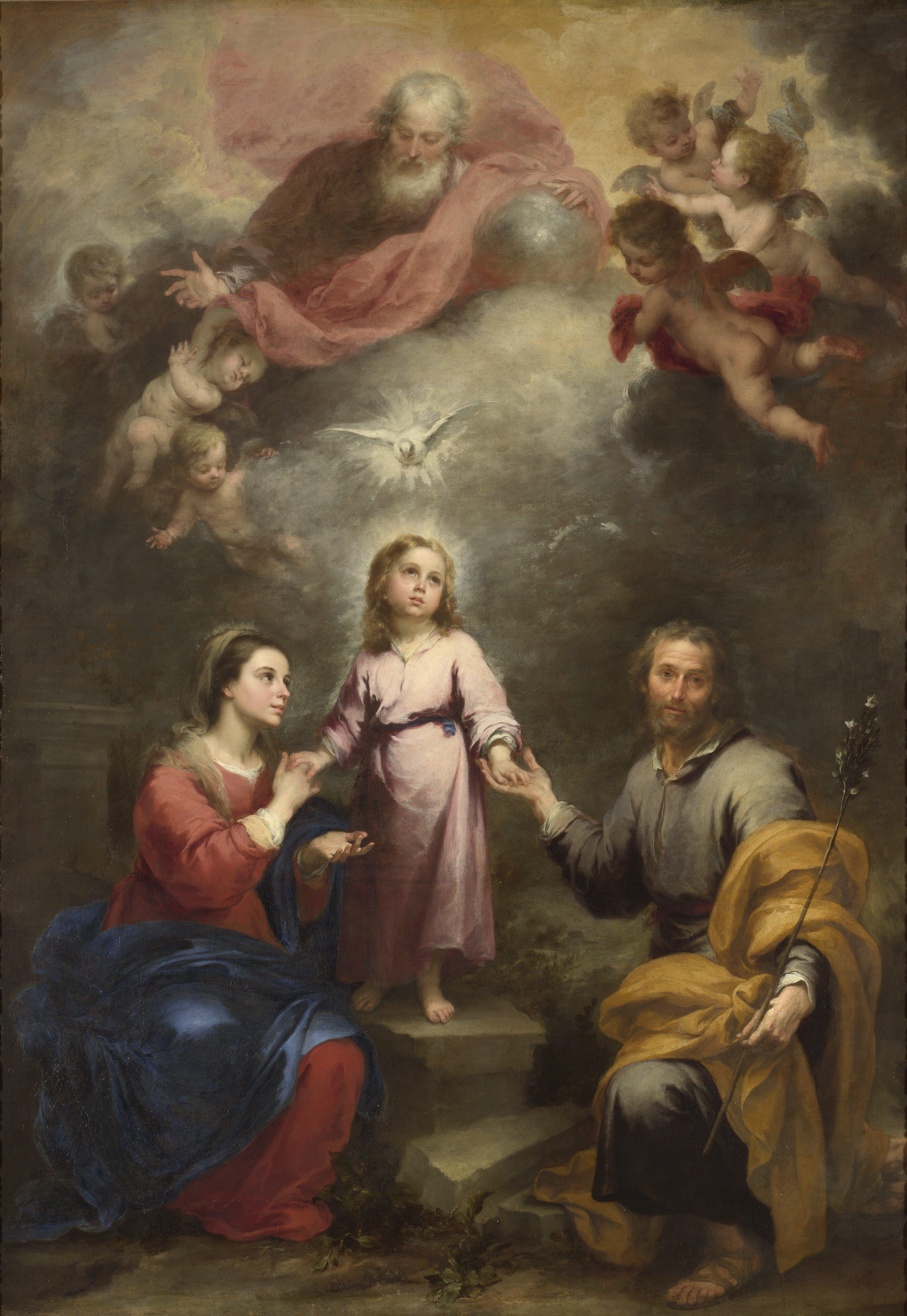
The "Heavenly Trinity" joined to the "Earthly Trinity" through the Incarnation of the Son–The Heavenly and Earthly Trinities by Murillo (c. 1677)

St. Justin and Clement of Alexandria referenced all three persons of the Trinity in their doxologies and St. Basil likewise, in the evening lighting of lamps.

Some authors state that Justin's texts were Binitarian, and the same applies to the texts of Tertullian and Eusebius of Caesarea. The divinization of the Holy Spirit began at the end of the 2nd century AD, through the writings of Irenaeus about 180 AD, which were elaborating for the first time a Trinitarian theology.

Origen of Alexandria (AD 185 – c. 253) has often been interpreted as Subordinationist—believing in shared divinity of the three persons but not in co-equality. However, some modern researchers have argued that Origen might have actually been anti-Subordinationist and that his own Trinitarian theology inspired the Trinitarian theology of the later Cappadocian Fathers.

The concept of the Trinity can be seen as developing significantly during the first four centuries by the Church Fathers in reaction to theological interpretations known as Adoptionism, Sabellianism, and Arianism. In 269, the Synods of Antioch condemned Paul of Samosata for his Adoptionist theology and also condemned the term homoousios (ὁμοούσιος, "of the same being") in the modalist sense in which he used it.

=== First Council of Nicaea (325) ===
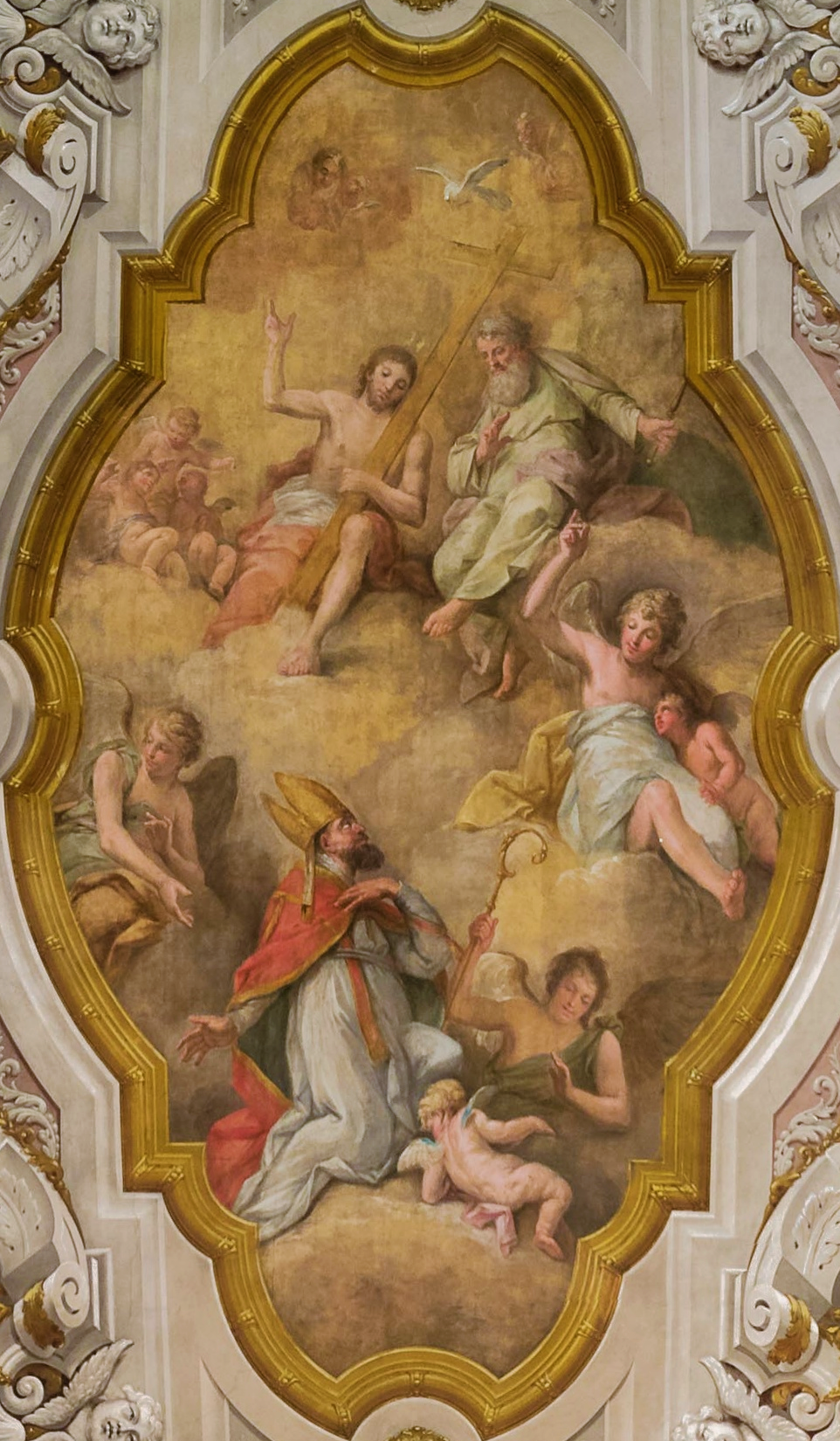
The Glory of Saint Nicholas, by António Manuel da Fonseca; Nicholas of Myra, a participant in the First Council of Nicaea, achieves the beatific vision in the shape of the Holy Trinity.

In the fourth century, Arianism, as traditionally understood, (Note: Very little of Arius' own writings have survived. We depend largely on quotations made by opponents which reflect what they thought he was saying. Furthermore, there was no single Arian party or agenda but rather various critics of the Nicene formula working from distinct perspectives.(Williams 2001)) taught that the Father existed prior to the Son, who was not, by nature, God but rather a changeable creature who was granted the dignity of becoming "Son of God". In 325, the First Council of Nicaea adopted the Nicene Creed which described Christ as "God of God, Light of Light, very God of very God, begotten, not made, being of one substance with the Father", and the "Holy Ghost" as the one by which "was incarnate ... of the Virgin Mary". ("the Word was made flesh and dwelled among us"). About the Father and the Son, the creed used the term homoousios (of one substance) to define the relationship between the Father and the Son. After more than fifty years of debate, homoousios was recognized as the hallmark of orthodoxy and was further developed into the formula of "three persons, one being".

The Confession of the First Council of Nicaea, the Nicene Creed, said little about the Holy Spirit. At the First Council of Nicea (325) all attention was focused on the relationship between the Father and the Son, without making any similar statement about the Holy Spirit. In the words of the creed:

We believe in one God, the Father Almighty, Maker of all things visible and invisible. And in one Lord Jesus Christ, the Son of God, begotten of the Father [the only-begotten; that is, of the essence of the Father, God of God,] Light of Light, very God of very God, begotten, not made, being of one substance with the Father; ... And [we believe] in the Holy Ghost.

Some authors state the Nicene Creed of 325 was a binitarian creed (although it passingly mentions the Holy Spirit).

=== First Council of Constantinople (381) ===
Later, at the First Council of Constantinople (381), the Nicene Creed would be expanded, known as Niceno-Constantinopolitan Creed, by saying that the Holy Spirit is worshiped and glorified together with the Father and the Son (συμπροσκυνούμενον καὶ συνδοξαζόμενον), suggesting that he was also consubstantial with them:

We believe in one God, the Father Almighty, Maker of heaven and earth, and of all things visible and invisible. And in one Lord Jesus Christ, the only-begotten Son of God, begotten of the Father before all worlds (æons), Light of Light, very God of very God, begotten, not made, being of one substance with the Father; ... And in the Holy Ghost, the Lord and Giver of life, who proceedeth from the Father, who with the Father and the Son together is worshiped and glorified, who spake by the prophets ...

The doctrine of the divinity and personality of the Holy Spirit was developed by Athanasius in the last decades of his life. He defended and refined the Nicene formula. By the end of the 4th century, under the leadership of Basil of Caesarea, Gregory of Nyssa, and Gregory of Nazianzus (the Cappadocian Fathers), the doctrine had reached substantially its current form.

=== Middle Ages ===
Gregory of Nazianzus, Gregory of Nyssa, and Basil the Great account for the Trinity saw that the distinctions between the three divine persons were solely in their inner divine relations. There are not three gods; God is one divine Being in three persons. Where the Cappadocian Fathers used social analogies to describe the triune nature of God, Augustine of Hippo used psychological analogy. He believed that if man is created in the image of God, he is created in the image of the Trinity. Augustine's analogy for the Trinity is the memory, intelligence, and will in the mind of a man. In short, Christians do not have to think of three persons when they think of God; they may think of one person.

In the late 6th century, some Latin-speaking churches added the words "and from the Son" (Filioque) to the description of the procession of the Holy Spirit, words that were not included in the text by either the Council of Nicaea or that of Constantinople. This was incorporated into the liturgical practice of Rome in 1014. Filioque eventually became one of the main causes for the East–West Schism in 1054 and the failures of the repeated union attempts.

Gregory of Nazianzus would say of the Trinity, "No sooner do I conceive of the One than I am illumined by the splendour of the Three; no sooner do I distinguish Three than I am carried back into the One. When I think of any of the Three, I think of Him as the Whole, and my eyes are filled, and the greater part of what I am thinking escapes me. I cannot grasp the greatness of that One so as to attribute a greater greatness to the rest. When I contemplate the Three together, I see but one torch, and cannot divide or measure out the undivided light."

== Theology ==
=== Baptismal formula ===
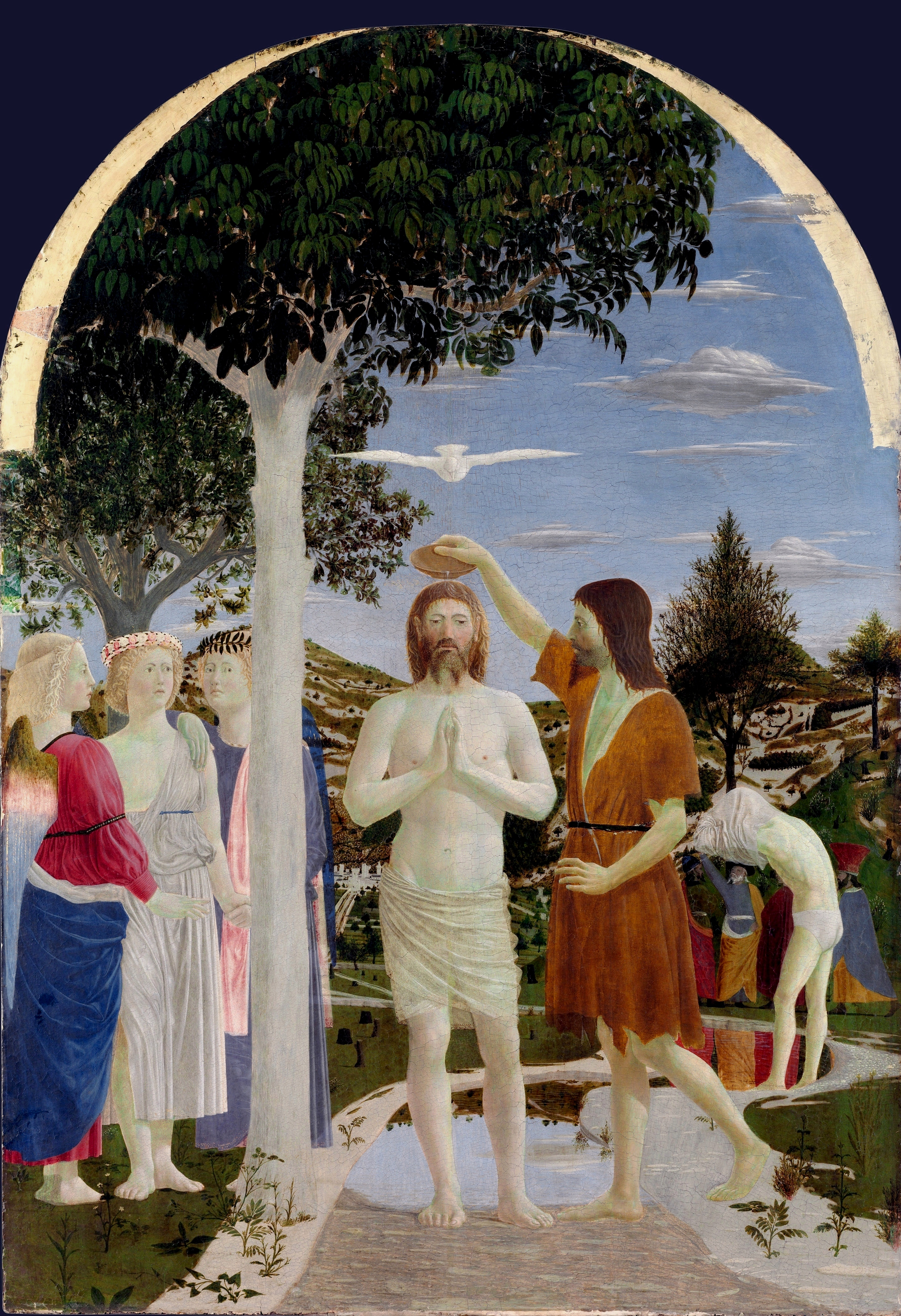
The Baptism of Christ, by Piero della Francesca, 15th century

Baptism is generally conferred with the Trinitarian formula, "in the name of the Father, and of the Son, and of the Holy Spirit". Trinitarians identify this name with the Christian faith into which baptism is an initiation, as seen, for example, in the statement of Basil the Great (330–379): "We are bound to be baptized in the terms we have received, and to profess faith in the terms in which we have been baptized." The First Council of Constantinople (381) also says, "This is the Faith of our baptism that teaches us to believe in the Name of the Father, of the Son and of the Holy Spirit. According to this Faith there is one Godhead, Power, and Being of the Father, of the Son, and of the Holy Spirit." This may be taken to indicate that baptism was associated with this formula from the earliest decades of the Church's existence. Other Trinitarian formulas found in the New Testament include 2 Corinthians 13:14, 1 Corinthians 12:4–6, Ephesians 4:4–6, 1 Peter 1:2, and Revelation 1:4–5.

Oneness Pentecostals demur from the Trinitarian view of baptism and emphasize baptism "in the name of Jesus Christ" only, what they hold to be the original apostolic formula. For this reason, they often focus on the baptisms in Acts. Those who place great emphasis on the baptisms in Acts often likewise question the authenticity of Matthew 28:19 in its present form. Most scholars of New Testament textual criticism accept the authenticity of the passage since there are no variant manuscripts regarding the formula, and the extant form of the passage is attested in the Didache and other patristic works of the 1st and 2nd centuries: Ignatius, Tertullian, Hippolytus, Cyprian, and Gregory Thaumaturgus.

Commenting on Matthew 28:19, Gerhard Kittel states:

This threefold relation [of Father, Son and Spirit] soon found fixed expression in the triadic formulae in 2 Corinthians 13:14 and in 1 Corinthians 12:4–6. The form is first found in the baptismal formula in Matthew 28:19 Did., 7. 1 and 3. ... [I]t is self-evident that Father, Son and Spirit are here linked in an indissoluble threefold relationship.

=== Economic and immanent Trinity ===
The term "immanent Trinity" focuses on who God is; the term "economic Trinity" focuses on what God does. According to the Catechism of the Catholic Church:

The Fathers of the Church distinguish between theology (theologia) and economy (oikonomia). "Theology" refers to the mystery of God's inmost life within the Blessed Trinity and "economy" to all the works by which God reveals himself and communicates his life. Through the oikonomia the theologia is revealed to us; but conversely, the theologia illuminates the whole oikonomia. God's works reveal who he is in himself; the mystery of his inmost being enlightens our understanding of all his works. So it is, analogously, among human persons. A person discloses himself in his actions, and the better we know a person, the better we understand his actions.

The whole divine economy is the common work of the three divine persons. For as the Trinity has only one and the same natures so too does it have only one and the same operation: "The Father, the Son and the Holy Spirit are not three principles of creation but one principle." However, each divine person performs the common work according to his unique personal property. Thus the Church confesses, following the New Testament, "one God and Father from whom all things are, and one Lord Jesus Christ, through whom all things are, and one Holy Spirit in whom all things are". It is above all the divine missions of the Son's Incarnation and the gift of the Holy Spirit that show forth the properties of the divine persons.

The ancient Nicene theologians argued that everything the Trinity does is done by Father, Son, and Spirit working in unity with one will. The three persons of the Trinity always work inseparably, for their work is always the work of the one God. The Son's will cannot be different from the Father's because it is the Father's. They have but one will as they have but one being. Otherwise, they would not be one God. On this point St. Basil said:

When then He says, "I have not spoken of myself", and again, "As the Father said unto me, so I speak", and "The word which ye hear is not mine, but [the Father's] which sent me", and in another place, "As the Father gave me commandment, even so I do", it is not because He lacks deliberate purpose or power of initiation, nor yet because He has to wait for the preconcerted key-note, that he employs language of this kind. His object is to make it plain that His own will is connected in indissoluble union with the Father. Do not then let us understand by what is called a "commandment" a peremptory mandate delivered by organs of speech, and giving orders to the Son, as to a subordinate, concerning what He ought to do. Let us rather, in a sense befitting the Godhead, perceive a transmission of will, like the reflexion of an object in a mirror, passing without note of time from Father to Son.

According to Thomas Aquinas the Son prayed to the Father, became a minor to the angels, became incarnate, obeyed the Father as to his human nature; as to his divine nature the Son remained God: "Thus, then, the fact that the Father glorifies, raises up, and exalts the Son does not show that the Son is less than the Father, except in His human nature. For, in the divine nature by which He is equal to the Father, the power of the Father and the Son is the same and their operation is the same." Aquinas stated that the mystery of the Son cannot be explicitly believed to be true without faith in the Trinity (ST IIa IIae, 2.7 resp. and 8 resp.).

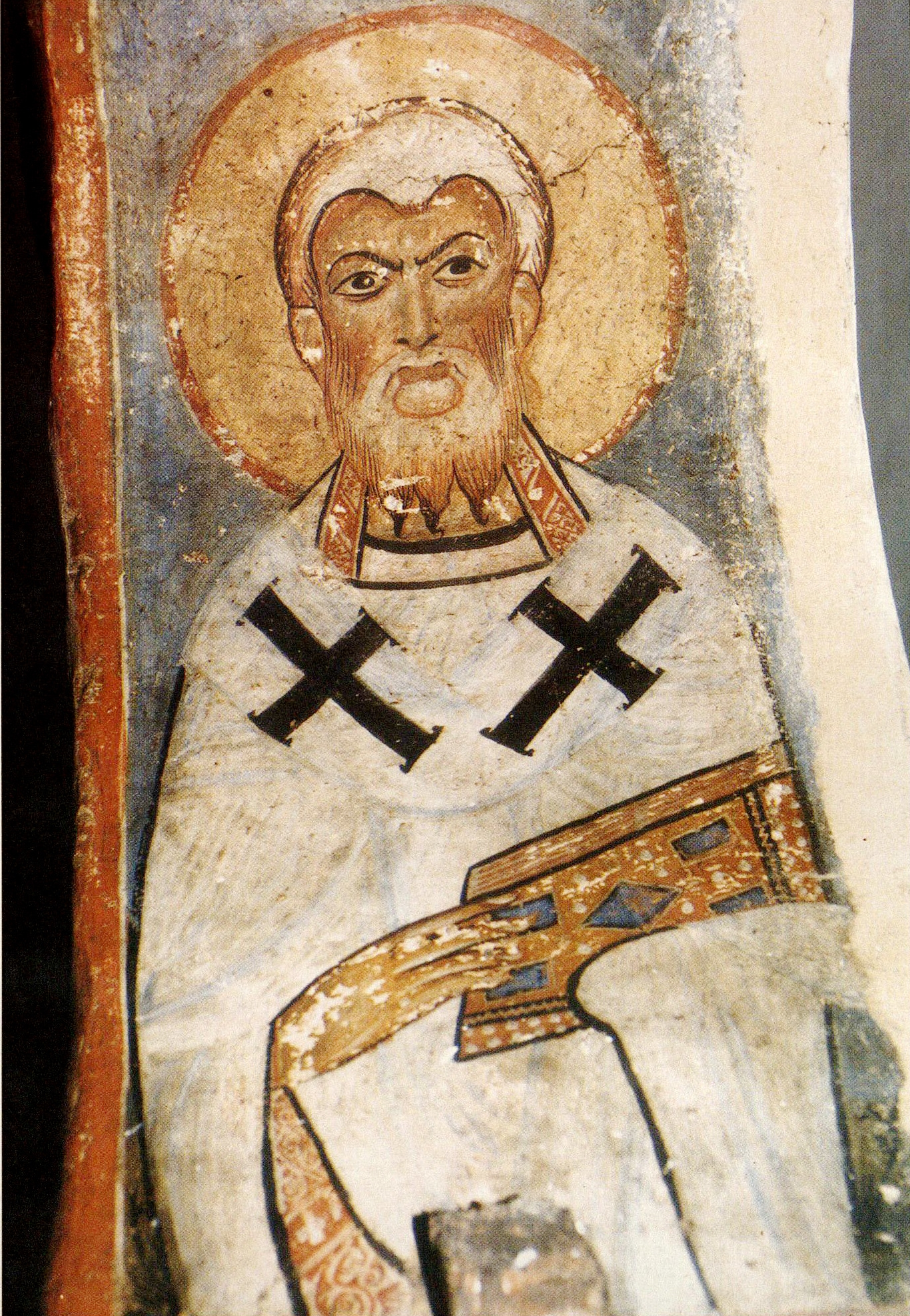
A Greek fresco of Athanasius of Alexandria, the chief architect of the Nicene Creed, formulated at Nicaea

Athanasius of Alexandria explained that the Son is eternally one in being with the Father, temporally and voluntarily subordinate in his incarnate ministry. Such human traits, he argued, were not to be read back into the eternal Trinity. Likewise, the Cappadocian Fathers also insisted there was no economic inequality present within the Trinity. As Basil wrote: "We perceive the operation of the Father, Son, and Holy Spirit to be one and the same, in no respect showing differences or variation; from this identity of operation we necessarily infer the unity of nature."

The traditional theory of "appropriation" consists in attributing certain names, qualities, or operations to one of the Persons of the Trinity, not, however, to the exclusion of the others, but in preference to the others. This theory was established by the Latin Fathers of the fourth and fifth centuries, especially by Hilary of Poitiers, Augustine, and Leo the Great. In the Middle Ages, the theory was systematically taught by the Schoolmen such as Bonaventure.

=== Love ===
Augustine "coupled the doctrine of the Trinity with anthropology. Proceeding from the idea that humans are created by God according to the divine image, he attempted to explain the mystery of the Trinity by uncovering traces of the Trinity in the human personality". The first key of his exegesis is an interpersonal analogy of mutual love. In De trinitate (399–419) he wrote:

We are now eager to see whether that most excellent love is proper to the Holy Spirit, and if it is not so, whether the Father, or the Son, or the Holy Trinity itself is love, since we cannot contradict the most certain faith and the most weighty authority of Scripture which says: "God is love". (Note: (in Latin) Veluti nunc cupimus videre utrum illa excellentissima caritas proprie Spiritus Sanctus sit. Quod si non est, aut Pater est caritas, aut Filius, aut ipsa Trinitas, quoniam resistere non possumus certissimae fidei, et validissimae auctoritati Scripturae dicentis: 'Deus caritas est'.)

One must, therefore, ask if love itself is triune. Augustine found that it is, and consists of "three: the lover, the beloved, and the love". (Note: (in Latin) Tria ergo sunt: amans, et quod amatur, et amor.)

Reaffirming the theopaschite formula unus de trinitate passus est carne (meaning "One of the Trinity suffered in the flesh"), Thomas Aquinas wrote that Jesus suffered and died as to his human nature, as to his divine nature he could not suffer or die. "But the commandment to suffer clearly pertains to the Son only in His human nature. ... And the way in which Christ was raised up is like the way He suffered and died, that is, in the flesh. For it says in 1 Peter (4:1): 'Christ having suffered in the flesh' ... then, the fact that the Father glorifies, raises up, and exalts the Son does not show that the Son is less than the Father, except in His human nature. For, in the divine nature by which He is equal to the Father."

In the 1900s the recovery of a substantially different formula of theopaschism took place: at least unus de Trinitate passus est (meaning "not only in the flesh"). More specifically, World War II had an impact not only on the theodicy of Judaism with the Holocaust theology, but also on that of Christianity with a profound rethinking of its dogmatic theology. Deeply affected by the atomic bomb event, as early as 1946 the Lutheran theologian Kazoh Kitamori published Theology of the Pain of God, a theology of the Cross pushed up to the immanent Trinity. This concept was later taken by both Reformed and Catholic theology: in 1972 by Jürgen Moltmann's The Crucified God; in the 1972 "Preface to the Second Edition" of his 1969 German book Theologie der drei Tage (English translation: The Mystery of Easter) by Hans Urs von Balthasar, who took a cue from Revelation 13:8 (Vulgate: agni qui occisus est ab origine mundi, NIV: "the Lamb who was slain from the creation of the world") to explore the "God is love" idea as an "eternal super-kenosis". In the words of von Balthasar: "At this point, where the subject undergoing the 'hour' is the Son speaking with the Father, the controversial 'Theopaschist formula' has its proper place: 'One of the Trinity has suffered.' The formula can already be found in Gregory Nazianzen: 'We needed a ... crucified God'." But if theopaschism indicates only a Christological kenosis (or kenotic Christology), instead von Balthasar supports a Trinitarian kenosis: "The persons of the Trinity constitute themselves as who they are through the very act of pouring themselves out for each other". This allows to clearly distinguish his idea from Subordinationism.

Furthermore, following the concepts developed by Scholasticism, the underlying question is whether the three Persons of the Trinity can experience self-love (amor sui), as well as whether for them, with the conciliar dogmatic formulation in terms that today we would call ontotheological, it is possible for aseity (causa sui) to be valid. If the Father is not the Son or the Spirit since the generator/begetter is not the generated/begotten nor the generation/generative process and vice versa, and since the lover is neither the beloved nor the love dynamic between them and vice versa. As a response, Christianity has provided an oblative, sacrificial, martyrizing, crucifying, and precisely kenotic concept of divine ontology.

=== One God in three persons ===
In Trinitarian doctrine, God exists as three persons but is one being, having a single divine nature. The members of the Trinity are co-equal and co-eternal, one in essence, nature, power, action, and will. As stated in the Athanasian Creed, the Father is uncreated, the Son is uncreated, and the Holy Spirit is uncreated, and all three are eternal without beginning. "The Father and the Son and the Holy Spirit" are not names for different parts of God, but one name for God because three persons exist in God as one entity. They cannot be separate from one another. Each person is understood as having the identical essence or nature, not merely similar natures.

According to the Eleventh Council of Toledo (675) "For, when we say: He who is the Father is not the Son, we refer to the distinction of persons; but when we say: the Father is that which the Son is, the Son that which the Father is, and the Holy Spirit that which the Father is and the Son is, this clearly refers to the nature or substance".

The Fourth Lateran Council (1215) adds: "Therefore in God there is only a Trinity, not a quaternity, since each of the three persons is that reality—that is to say substance, essence or divine nature-which alone is the principle of all things, besides which no other principle can be found. This reality neither begets nor is begotten nor proceeds; the Father begets, the Son is begotten and the Holy Spirit proceeds. Thus there is a distinction of persons but a unity of nature. Although therefore the Father is one person, the Son another person and the Holy Spirit another person, they are not different realities, but rather that which is the Father is the Son and the Holy Spirit, altogether the same; thus according to the orthodox and catholic faith they are believed to be consubstantial. "

Clarification of the relationships among the three Trinitarian Persons (divine persons, different from the sense of a "human self") advanced in the Magisterial statement promulgated by the Council of Florence (1431–1449), though its formulation precedes the council: "These three persons are one God and not three gods, for the three are one substance, one essence, one nature, one Godhead, one infinity, one eternity, and everything (in them) is one where there is no opposition of relationship [relationis oppositio]".

=== Perichoresis ===
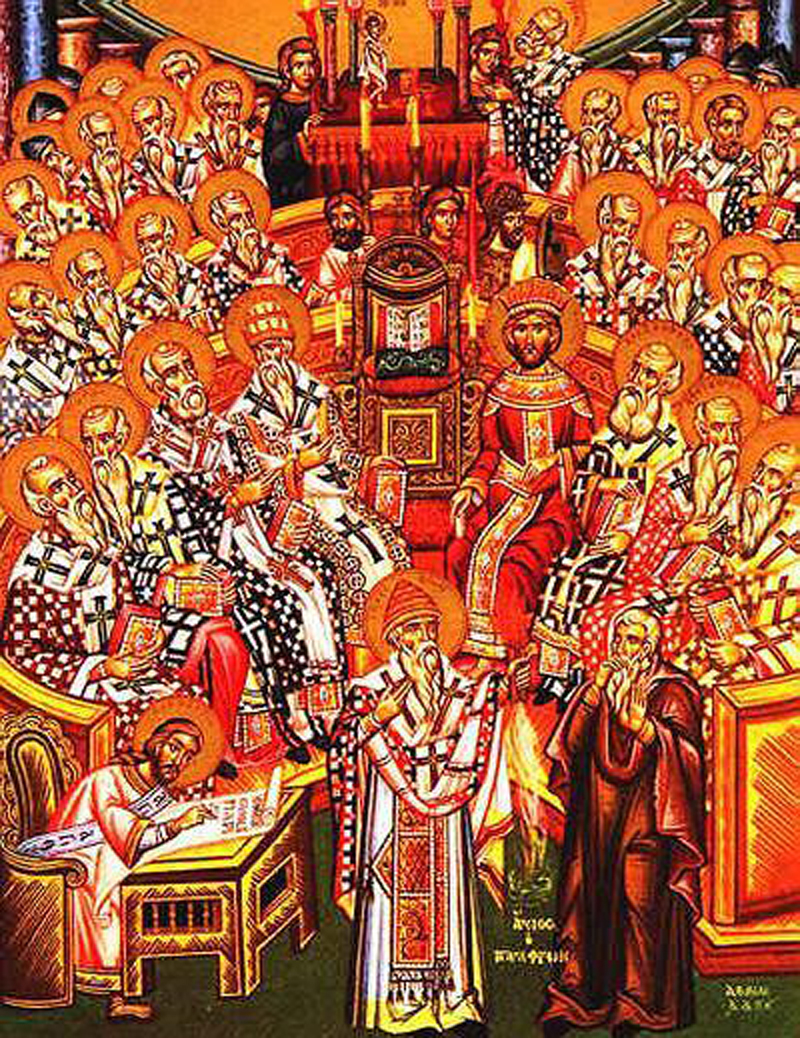
A depiction of the Council of Nicaea in AD 325, at which the Deity of Christ was declared orthodox and Arianism condemned

Perichoresis (from Greek, 'going around', 'envelopment') is a term used by some scholars to describe the relationship among the members of the Trinity. The Latin equivalent for this term is circumincessio. This concept refers for its basis to John 10:38,14:11,14:20, where Jesus is instructing the disciples concerning the meaning of his departure. His going to the Father, he says, is for their sake; so that he might come to them when the "other comforter" is given to them. Then, he says, his disciples will dwell in him, as he dwells in the Father, and the Father dwells in him, and the Father will dwell in them. This is so, according to the theory of perichoresis, because the persons of the Trinity "reciprocally contain one another, so that one permanently envelopes and is permanently enveloped by, the other whom he yet envelopes" (Hilary of Poitiers, Concerning the Trinity 3:1). The most prominent exponent of perichoresis was John of Damascus (d. 749) who employed the concept as a technical term to describe both the interpenetration of the divine and human natures of Christ and the relationship between the hypostases of the Trinity.

Perichoresis effectively excludes the idea that God has parts, but rather is a simple being. It also harmonizes well with the doctrine that the Christian's union with the Son in his humanity brings him into union with one who contains in himself, in Paul's words, "all the fullness of deity" and not a part. (Note: See also Divinization (Christian)) Perichoresis provides an intuitive figure of what this might mean. The Son, the eternal Word, is from all eternity the dwelling place of God; he is the "Father's house", just as the Son dwells in the Father and the Spirit; so that, when the Spirit is "given", then it happens as Jesus said, "I will not leave you as orphans; for I will come to you."

=== Relationship between the persons ===
Although all Trinitarians agree that there exists one God in three persons, Trinitarian theologians have differed on how to explain the relationships of the persons of the Trinity, among them are the eternal generation of the Son, the functional subordination of the Son, the eternal procession of the Spirit, the Filioque and the subordinationism.

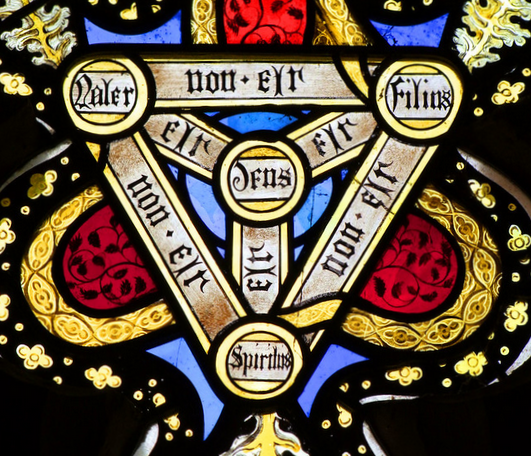
The Holy Trinity on the stained glass windows of the Church of Saint Peter and Saint Paul in Brockdish

The doctrine of eternal generation is defined as a necessary and eternal act of God the Father, in which he generates (or begets) God the Son by communicating the whole divine essence to the Son. Generation is not defined as an act of the will, but is by necessity of nature. This doctrine has been affirmed by the Athanasian Creed, the Nicene Creed and by church fathers such as Athanasius of Alexandria, Augustine, and Basil of Caesarea being mentioned explicitly first by Origen of Alexandria. Those who teach the traditional doctrine of eternal generation have often used biblical texts such as Proverbs 8:23, Psalm 2:7, Micah 5:2, John 5:26, John 1:18, 3:16, Colossians 1:15, 2 Corinthians 4:4 and Hebrews 1:3 to establish their understanding of eternal generation. However, some modern theologians reject the doctrines of eternal generation and procession, disputing the idea that these texts teach the doctrine of eternal generation. To reject eternal generation, William Lane Craig has argued, is to introduce subordinationism into the Trinity.

Among modern Trinitarian debates, the issue of social Trinitarianism is often discussed. Although it is a diverse theological movement, many of its advocates argue that each person of the Trinity has their own center of consciousness and own will united in a loving relationship. Critics argue it risks veering into tritheism (belief in three gods) by overemphasizing the distinctness of the persons, while proponents say it better reflects the biblical portrayal of the Trinity as relational and active in history. Social Trinitarianism is in contrast to what is often called "classical Trinitarianism" due to its association with many classical theologians such as Augustine, which instead distinguishes the persons by their eternal relations of begetting and procession.

=== Nontrinitarianism ===
Nontrinitarianism (or antitrinitarianism) refers to Christian belief systems that reject the doctrine of the Trinity as found in the Nicene Creed as not having a scriptural origin. Nontrinitarian views differ widely on the nature of God, Jesus, and the Holy Spirit.

Various nontrinitarian views, such as Adoptionism and Arianism, existed prior to the formal definition of the Trinity doctrine in AD 325, 360, and 431 at the Councils of Nicaea, Constantinople, and Ephesus, respectively. Adoptionists believed that Jesus became divine only at his baptism, resurrection, or ascension. Adherents of Arianism postulated that only God has independent existence. Since the Son is dependent, he should, therefore, be called a creature.

Arianism was condemned as heretical by the First Council of Nicaea and, lastly, with Sabellianism by the Second Ecumenical Council. Adoptionism was declared as heretical by the Ecumenical Council of Frankfurt, convened by the Emperor Charlemagne in 794 for the Latin West Church. Following the adoption of trinitarianism at Constantinople in 381, Arianism was driven from the Empire, retaining a foothold amongst the Germanic tribes. When the Franks converted to Catholicism in 496, however, it gradually faded out. Nontrinitarianism was later renewed in the Gnosticism of the Cathars in the 11th through 13th centuries, in the Age of Enlightenment of the 18th century, and in some groups arising during the Second Great Awakening of the 19th century. (Note: See also binitarianism)

=== Judaism ===
While Judaism traditionally rejects the doctrine of the Trinity, some Jewish mystical texts have expressed ideas that bear a resemblance to trinitarian concepts. For example, the Zohar (AD 1286), a foundational work of Jewish mysticism, states that "God is they, and they are it." This passage has been interpreted by some as referencing a kind of "kabbalistic trinity," describing "three hidden lights" within "the root of all roots"—a unified essence and origin. The parallels between these mystical notions and Christian trinitarianism were striking enough that some medieval Jewish thinkers suggested the Christian Trinity may have arisen from a misinterpretation of Kabbalistic teachings. However, some recent Jewish scholars instead view the Zohar as being influenced by Christian trinitarianism. Nevertheless, some later Jewish Aristotelians borrowed from the trinitarian analogies of Augustine of Hippo, making the claim that God is a thinker, thinking, and thought itself.

According to Philo (20 BC – c. AD 50), the Logos—or divine reason—was the instrument through which God created the world. For Philo, the ultimate Being possesses two primary attributes: goodness and authority. The Logos represents the union of these two powers. As pure being, this ultimate source is called the Father; in relation to goodness, he is called God; and in his rule over creation, he is called Lord. The Logos is sometimes portrayed not only as the combination of goodness and authority within the Father but also as existing above and between them, thereby being identified with the Supreme Being itself. In this way, Philo presents a kind of trinitarian view of the divine, though it differs from the Christian concept of the Trinity. Scholars continue to debate whether Philo viewed the Logos as a distinct person or as an impersonal force.

=== Gnosticism ===
In the Gnostic text known as the Gospel of the Egyptians, the Trinity is presented as the Father, the Mother and the Son originating from the Great Invisible Spirit. Likewise, the Gnostic Apocryphon of John features the One as the Father and the female divine being Barbelo as the Mother/Holy Spirit who give birth to a child together.

== Architecture ==
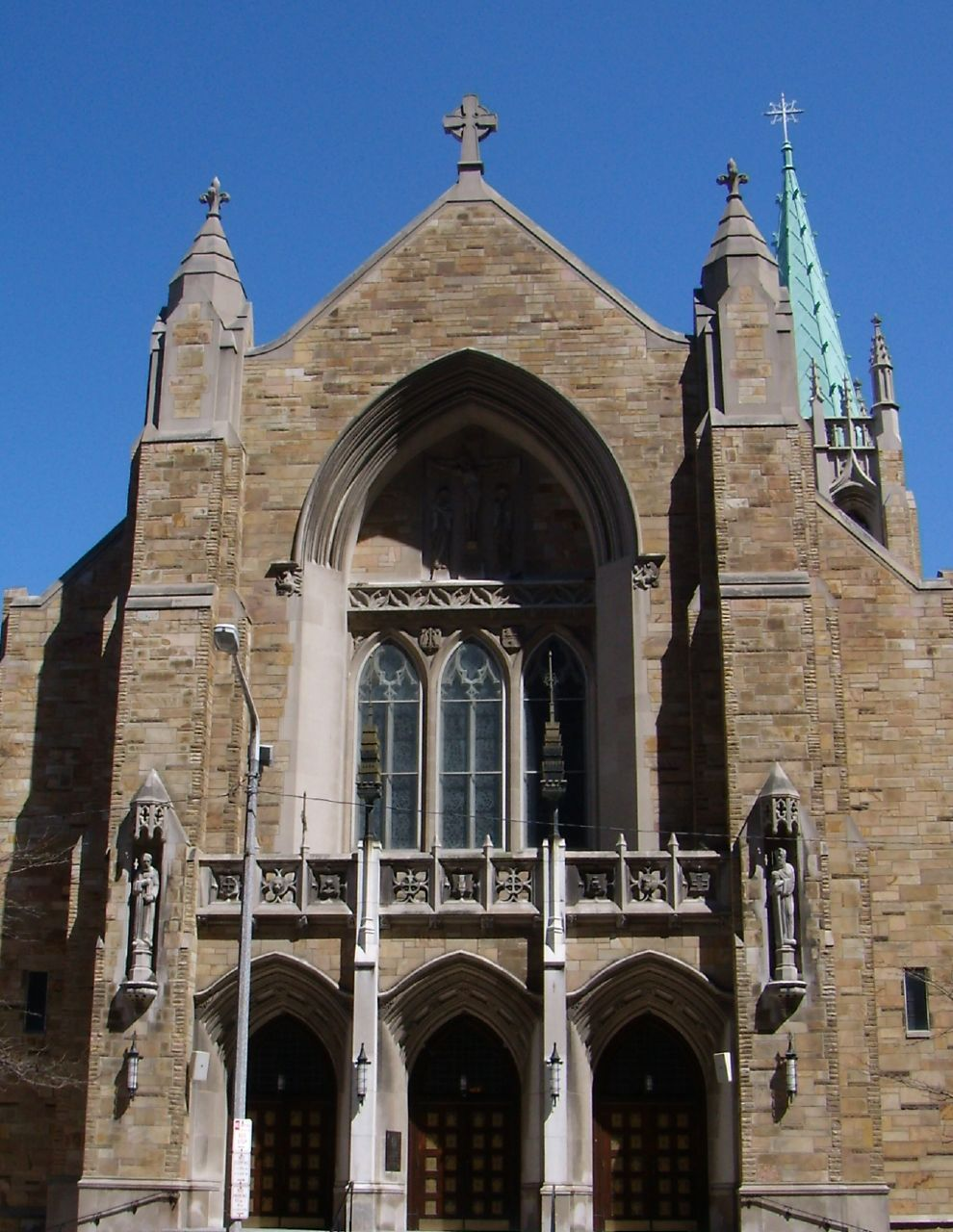
Three doors representing the trinity at a cathedral in Cleveland, Ohio

Almost every detail of Gothic cathedrals—the cruciform plan, the use of light, the statuary, the representation of the Trinity in trefoils and of the four evangelists in quatrefoils, and so on—reveals design decisions that are explicitly theological. However elaborate or simple the architecture, whether purpose-built for Christian use or not, the spaces used for Christian worship speak of theological meanings and values.

Many Christian churches have three doors symbolizing the Trinity. Other architectural features, such as windows or steps, are also grouped into three for this reason. This practice originated in spolia churches that were built from, and on top of, the remains of ancient pre-Christian holy structures.

Examples are the three royal doors inside Eastern churches and the trio of doors in the façade of many cathedrals. A triangular floor plan can also symbolize the Trinity, as in Heiligen-Geist-Kapelle in Austria.

== Artistic depictions ==
The Trinity is most commonly seen in Christian art with the Spirit represented by a dove, as specified in the gospel accounts of the baptism of Christ; he is nearly always shown with wings outspread. However, depictions using three human figures appear occasionally in most periods of art.

The Father and the Son are usually differentiated by age and later by dress, but this too is not always the case. The usual depiction of the Father as an older man with a white beard may derive from the biblical Ancient of Days, which is often cited in defense of this sometimes controversial representation. However, in Eastern Orthodoxy, the Ancient of Days is usually understood to be God the Son, not God the Father (see below)—early Byzantine images show Christ as the Ancient of Days, but this iconography became rare. When the Father is depicted in art, he is sometimes shown with a halo shaped like an equilateral triangle instead of a circle. The Son is often shown at the Father's right hand (Acts 7:56). He may be represented by a symbol—typically the Lamb (agnus dei) or a cross—or on a crucifix, so that the Father is the only human figure shown at full size. In early medieval art, the Father may be represented by a hand appearing from a cloud in a blessing gesture, for example, in scenes of the Baptism of Christ. Later, in the West, the Throne of Mercy (or "Throne of Grace") became a common depiction. In this style, the Father (sometimes seated on a throne) is shown supporting either a crucifix or, later, a slumped crucified Son, similar to the Pietà (this type is distinguished in German as the Not Gottes) in his outstretched arms, while the Dove hovers above or in between them. This subject continued to be popular until at least the 18th century.

By the end of the 15th century, larger representations, other than the Throne of Mercy, became effectively standardized, showing an older figure in plain robes for the Father, Christ with his torso partly bare to display the wounds of his Passion, and the dove above or around them. In earlier representations, both Father, especially, and Son often wear elaborate robes and crowns. Sometimes the Father alone wears a crown or even a papal tiara.

In the later part of the Christian Era, in Renaissance European iconography, the Eye of Providence began to be used as an explicit image of the Christian Trinity and associated with the concept of Divine Providence. Seventeenth-century depictions of the Eye of Providence sometimes show it surrounded by clouds or sunbursts.

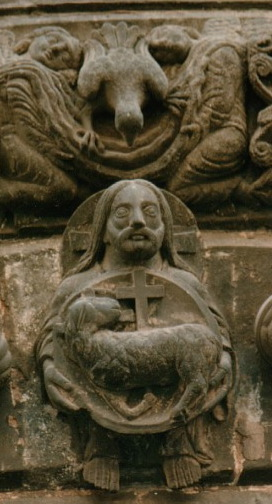
Depiction of Trinity from Saint Denis Basilica in Paris (12th century)

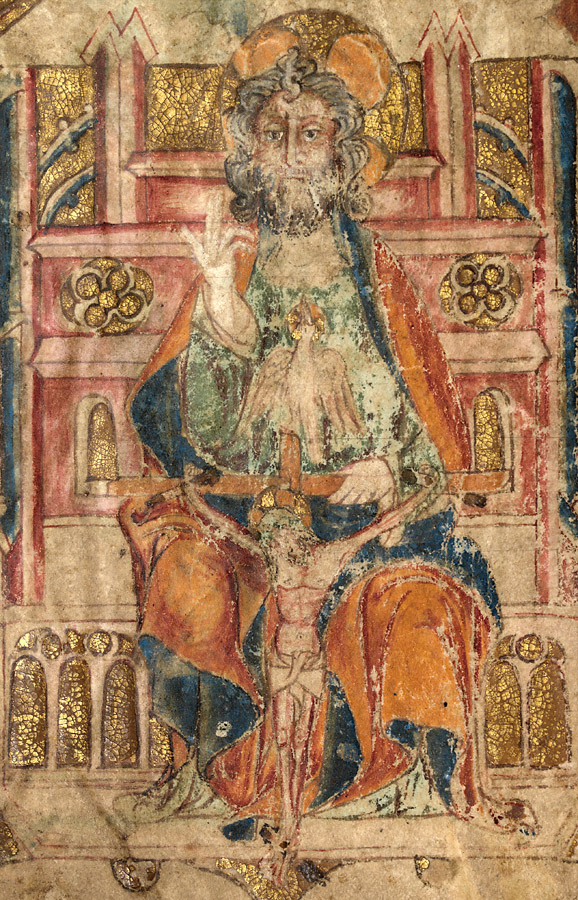
The Father, The Holy Spirit, and Christ crucified, depicted in a Welsh manuscript c. 1390–1400

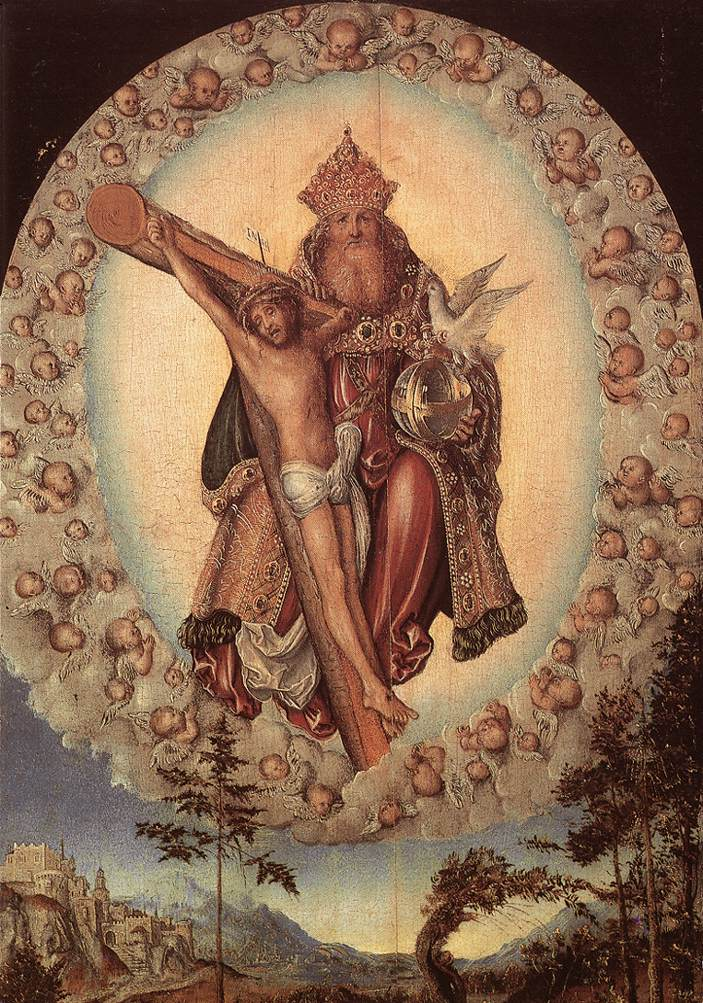
The Holy Trinity in an angelic glory over a landscape, by Lucas Cranach the Elder (d. 1553)

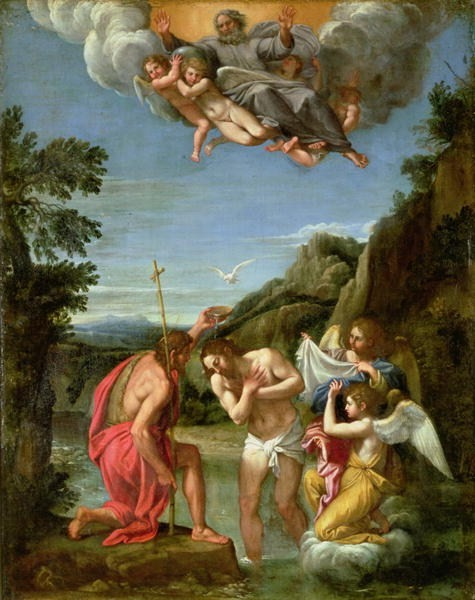
God the Father (top), and the Holy Spirit (represented by a dove) depicted above Jesus Painting by Francesco Albani (d. 1660)

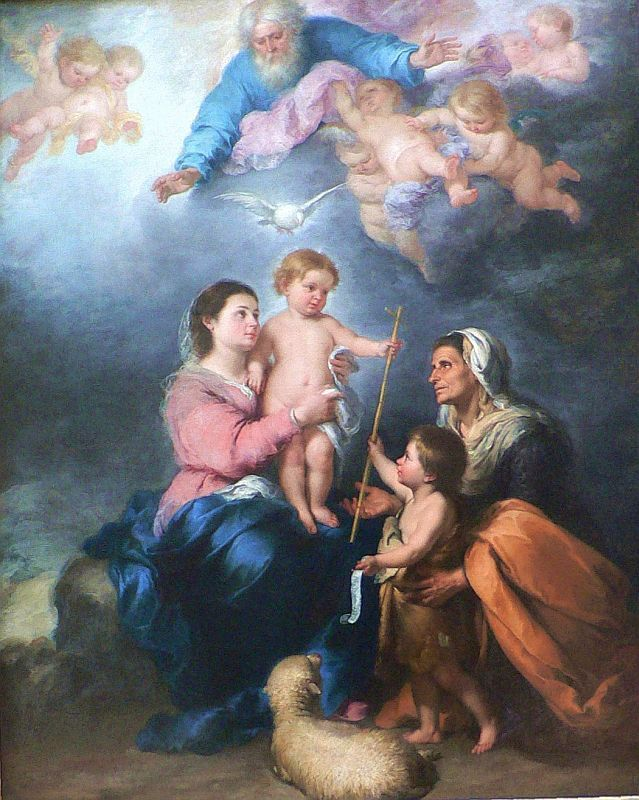
God the Father (top), the Holy Spirit (a dove), and the child Jesus, painting by Bartolomé Esteban Murillo (d. 1682)

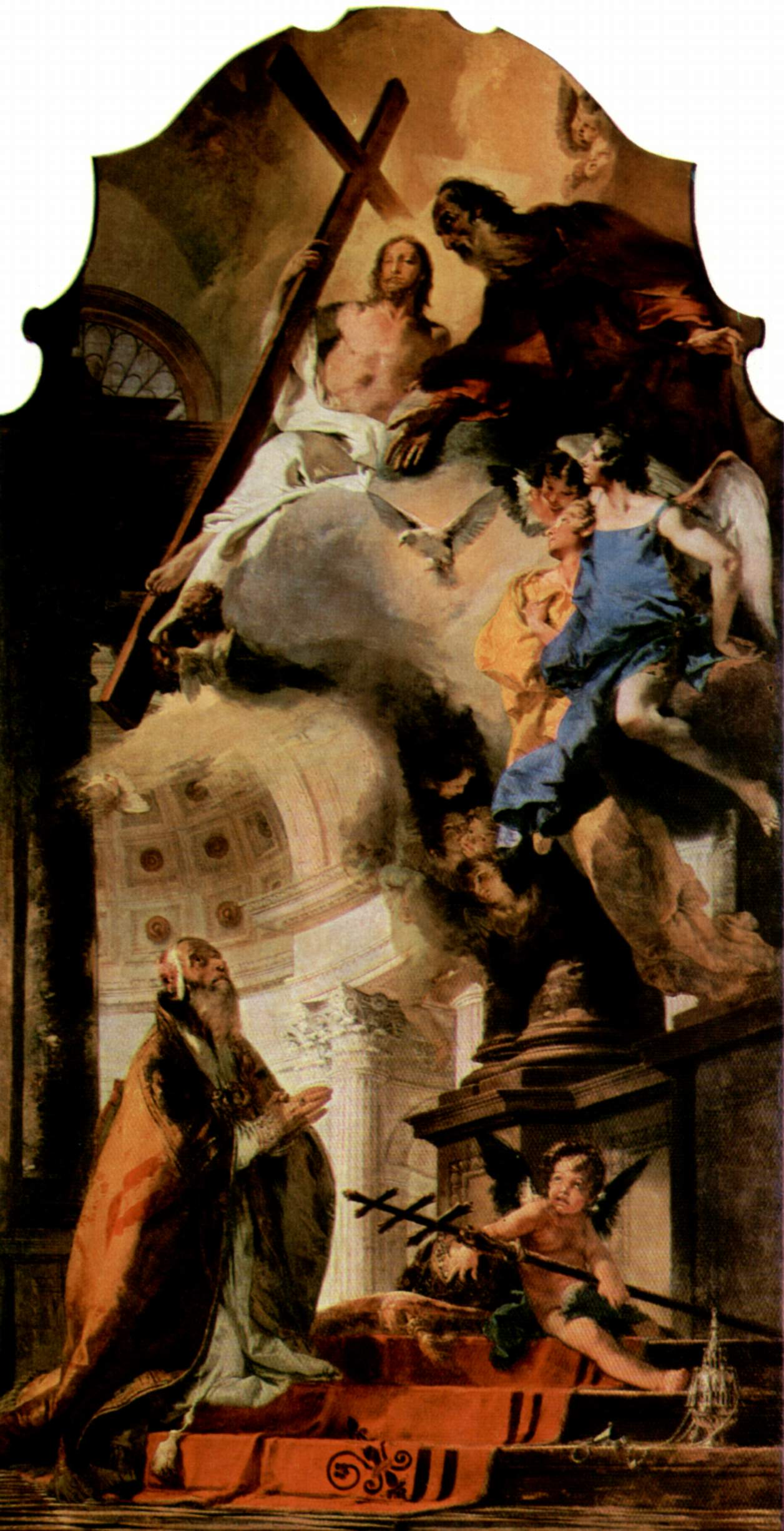
Pope Clement I prays to the Trinity, in a typical post-Renaissance depiction by Gianbattista Tiepolo (d. 1770).

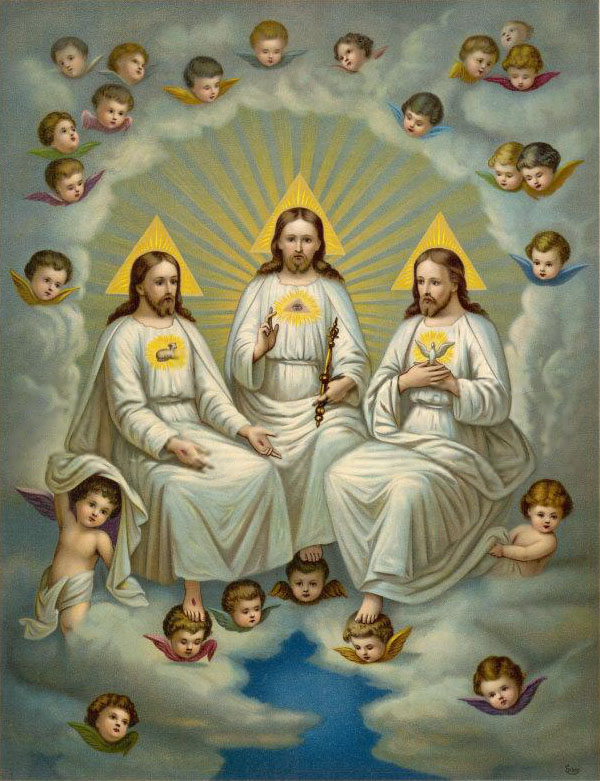
Atypical depiction of the Trinity where the Son is identified by a lamb, the Father an Eye of Providence, and the Spirit a dove

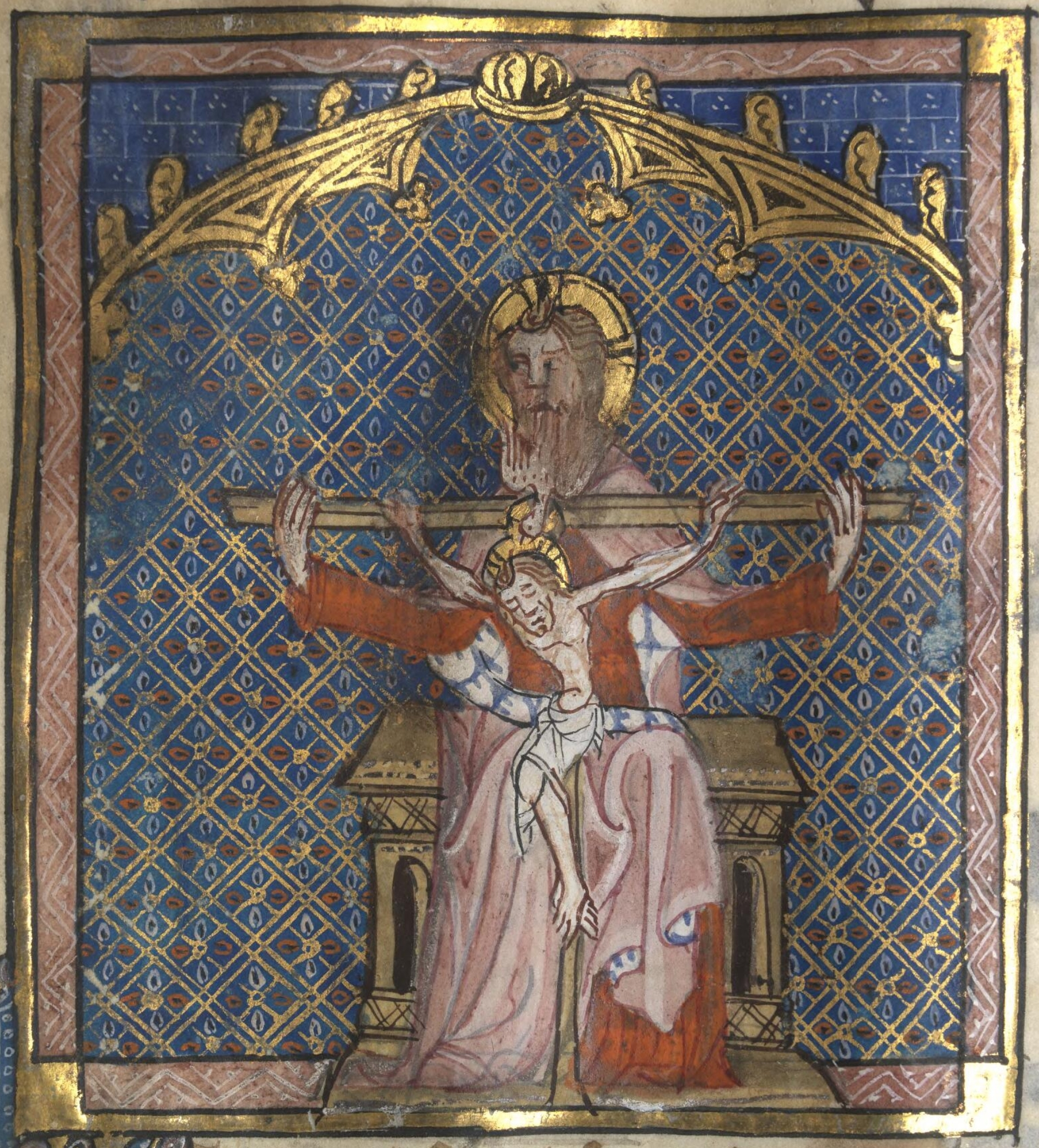
13th-century depiction of the Trinity from a Roman de la Rose manuscript

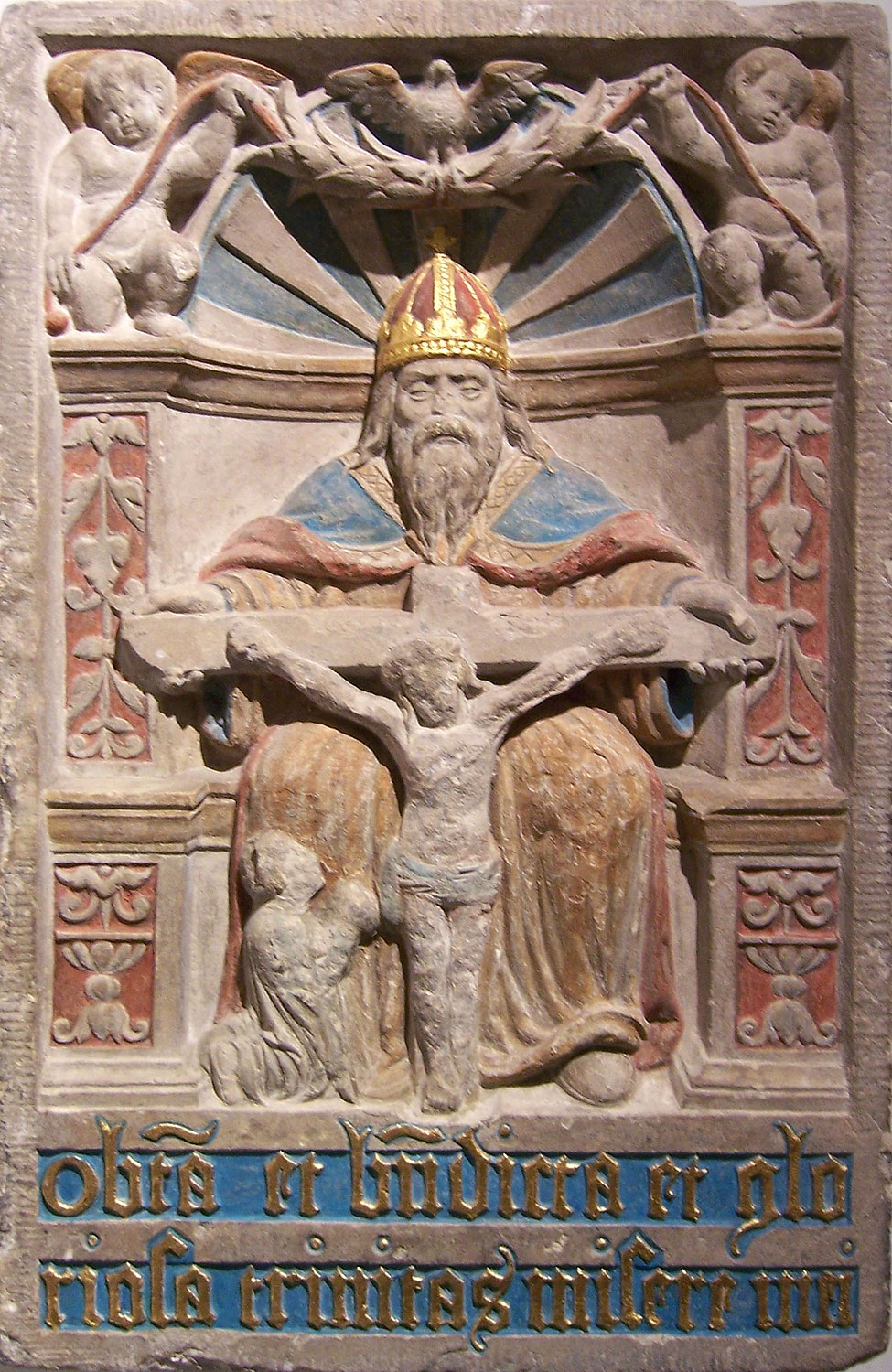
Representation of the Trinity in the form of the mercy seat (epitaph from 1549)

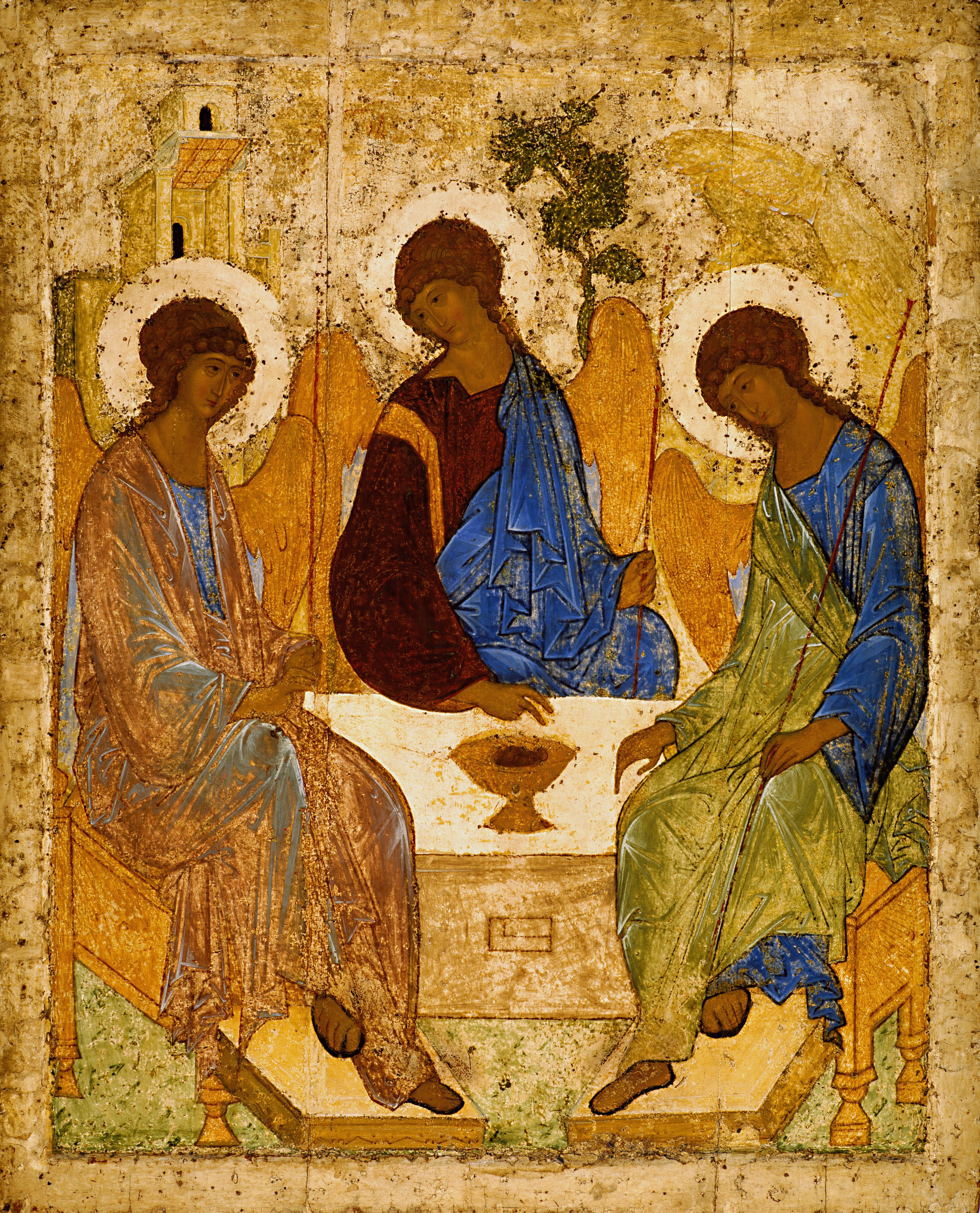
The Trinity by Russian icon painter Andrei Rublev, early 15th century: this portrayal of the three angels who visited Abraham at the Oak of Mamre (Genesis 18:1-8)

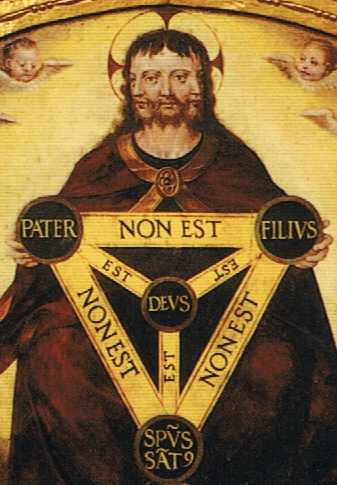
A representation of the Trifacial Trinity, as a three faced head, sometimes used in Renaissance iconography (but disavowed by the Catholic Church).

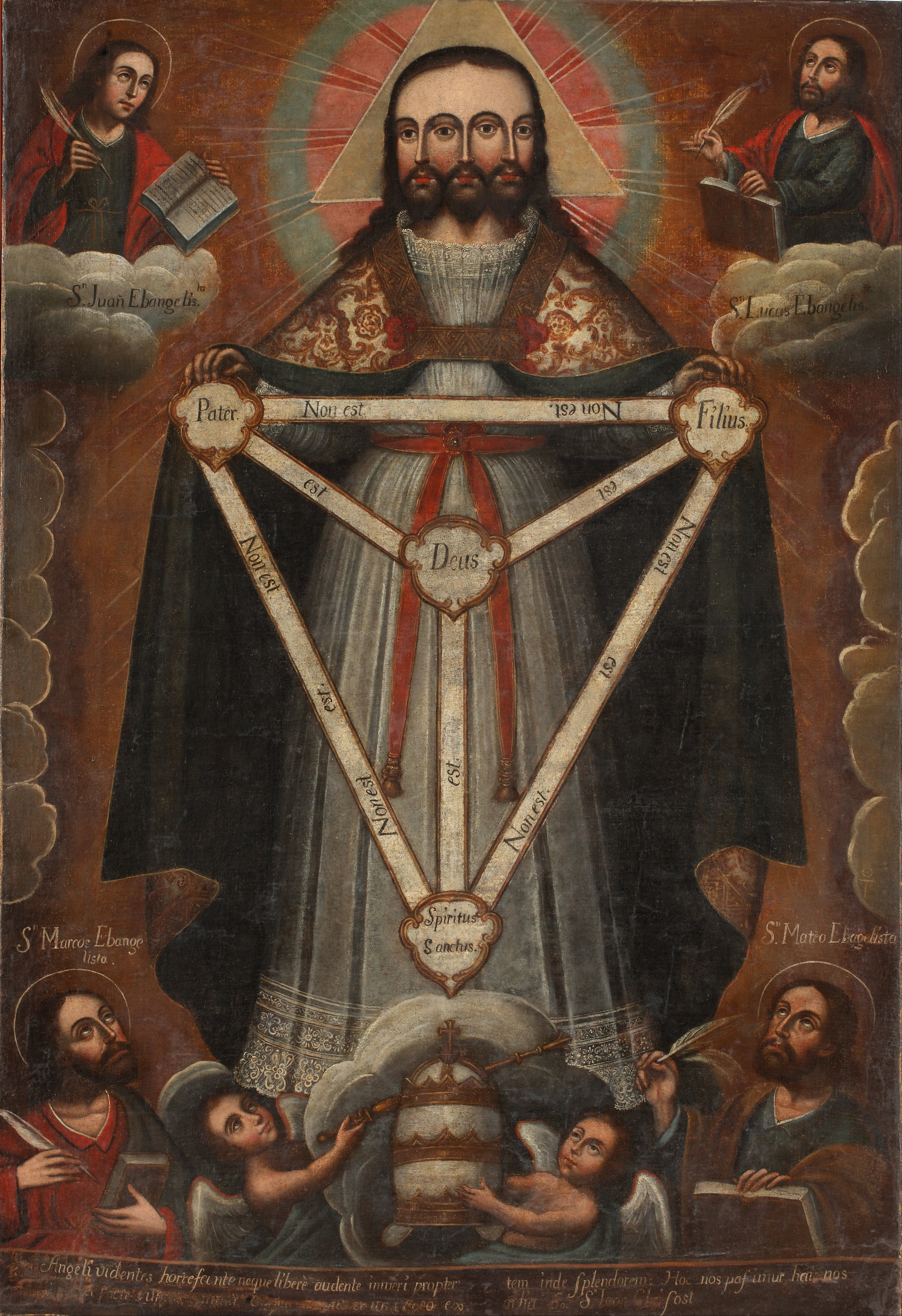
A painting depicting the Trifacial Trinity by an anonymous author from the Peruvian Cuzco School (but disavowed by the Catholic Church).

== See also ==
- Apostles' Creed
- Fatima prayer#Trinitarian prayers
- Formal distinction
- Hypostasis (philosophy and religion)
- Saint Patrick
- Sign of the cross
- Social trinitarianism
- Te Deum
- Three Pure Ones
- Trinitarian Order
- Trinitarian universalism
- Trinity Sunday, a day to celebrate the doctrine
- Triple deity, an associated term in comparative religion
- Triquetra, a symbol sometimes used to represent the Trinity
- Tritheism
