= The Brazen Serpent (Rubens) =

Painting by Peter Paul Rubens

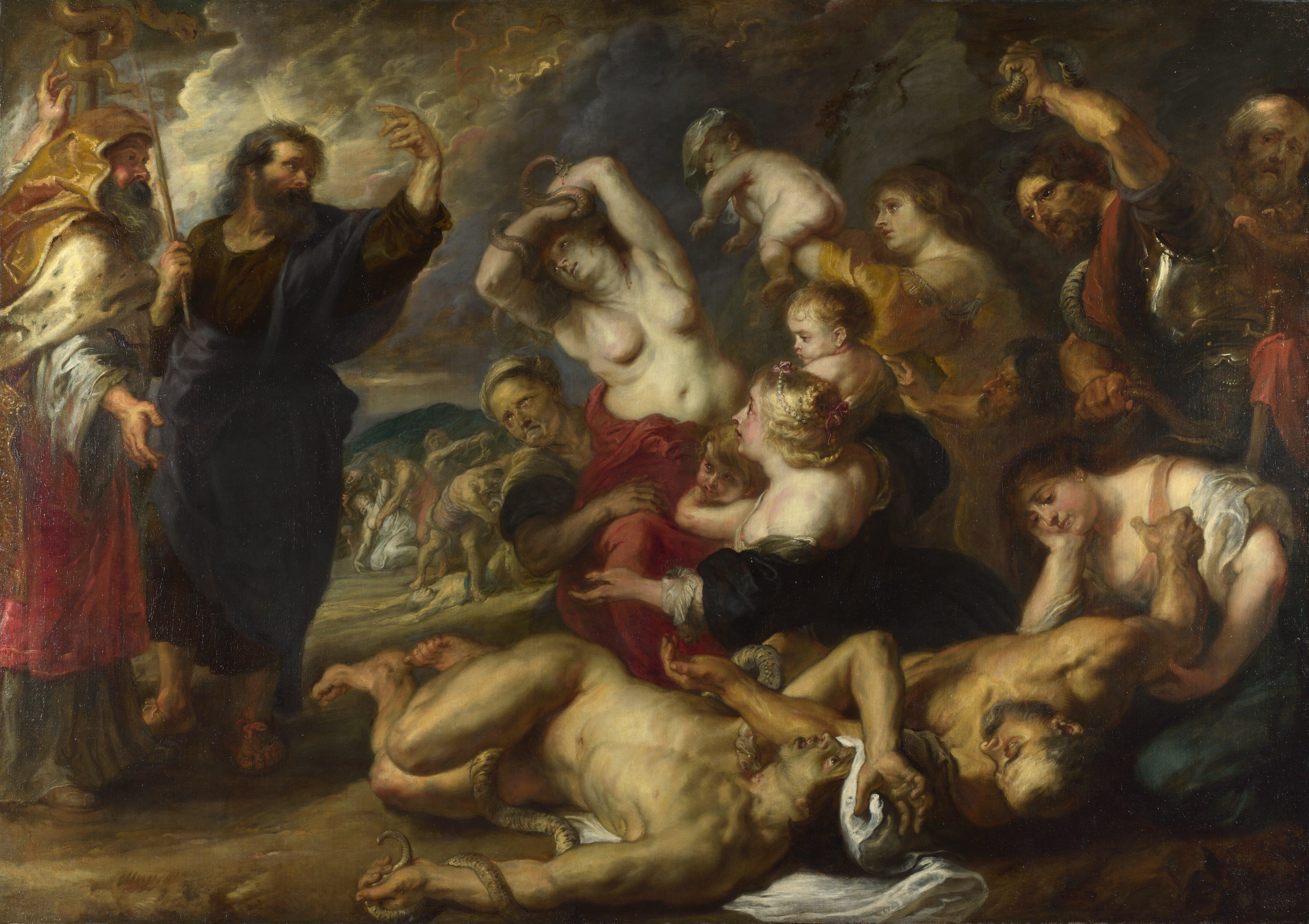
- Artist: Peter Paul Rubens
- Year: c 1635–1640
- Medium: oil on canvas
- Dimensions: 186.4 cm × 264.5 cm (73.4 in × 104.1 in)
- Location: National Gallery London

The Brazen Serpent is a painting by Peter Paul Rubens, probably dating to between 1635 and 1640. It is now in the National Gallery in London. Its shows a scene from the Old Testament (Numbers 21: 6–9).

It seems to include some work by his students, who may have blocked it in from a modello by Rubens himself, with the artist working up the result.
