= Outline of Christian theology =

Study of Christian belief and practice

The following outline is provided as an overview of and topical guide to Christian theology:

Christian theology is the study of Christian belief and practice. Such study concentrates primarily upon the texts of the Old Testament and the New Testament as well as on Christian tradition. Christian theologians use biblical exegesis, rational analysis, and argument. Theology might be undertaken to help the theologian better understand Christian tenets, to make comparisons between Christianity and other traditions, to defend Christianity against objections and criticism, to facilitate reforms in the Christian church, and to assist in the propagation of Christianity.

== Divisions of Christian theology ==
There are many methods of categorizing different approaches to Christian theology. For a historical analysis, see the main article on the History of Christian theology.

=== Sub-disciplines ===
Christian theologians may be specialists in one or more theological sub-disciplines. These sub-disciplines are often included in certain job titles such as 'Professor of x', 'Senior Lecturer in y':

- Apologetics/polemics – studying Christian theology as it compares to non-Christian worldviews in order to defend the faith and challenge beliefs that lie in contrast with Christianity.
- Biblical hermeneutics – interpretation of the Bible, often with particular emphasis on the nature and constraints of contemporary interpretation. Hermeneutics takes into consideration the culture at the time of writing, who wrote the text, who was the text written for, etc.
- Biblical studies – interpretation of the Bible, often with particular emphasis on historical-critical investigation.
- Biblical theology – interpretation of the Bible, often with particular emphasis on links between biblical texts and the topics of systematic or dogmatic theology.
- Constructive theology – generally another name for systematic theology; also specifically a postmodernist approach to systematic theology, applying (among other things) feminist theory, queer theory, deconstructionism, and hermeneutics to theological topics.
- Dogmatic theology – studying theology (or dogma) as it developed in different church denominations.
- Ecumenical theology – comparing the doctrines of the diverse churches (e.g., Eastern Orthodox, Roman Catholic, the various Protestant denominations) with the goal of promoting unity among them
- Exegesis – interpretation of the Bible.
- Historical theology – studying Christian theology via the thoughts of other Christians throughout the centuries.
- Homiletics – in theology the application of general principles of rhetoric to public preaching.
- Moral theology, specifically Christian ethics – explores the moral and ethical dimensions of the religious life
- Natural theology – the discussion of those aspects of theology that can be investigated without the help of revelation scriptures or tradition (sometimes contrasted with "positive theology").
- Patristics or patrology—studies the teaching of Church Fathers, or the development of Christian ideas and practice in the period of the Church Fathers.
- Philosophical theology – the use of philosophical methods in developing or analyzing theological concepts.
- Pragmatic or practical theology – studying theology as it relates to everyday living and service to God, including serving as a religious minister.
- Spiritual theology—studying theology as a means to orthopraxy; scripture and tradition are both used as guides for spiritual growth and discipline.
- Systematic theology (doctrinal theology, dogmatic theology or philosophical theology)—focused on the attempt to arrange and interpret the ideas current in the religion. This is also associated with constructive theology.
- Theological aesthetics – interdisciplinary study of theology and aesthetics/the arts.
- Theological hermeneutics – the study of the manner of construction of theological formulations. Related to theological methodology.

=== Major topics ===
These topics crop up repeatedly in Christian theology; composing the main recurrent 'loci' around which Christian theological discussion revolves.

- Bible (Holy Scripture) – the nature and means of its inspiration, etc.; including hermeneutics (the development and study of theories of the interpretation and understanding of texts and the topic of Biblical law in Christianity)
- Eschatology – the study of the last things, or end times. Covers subjects such as death and the afterlife, the end of history, the end of the world, the last judgment, the nature of hope and progress, etc.
- Christology – the study of Jesus Christ, of his nature(s), and of the relationship between his divinity and humanity;
- Divine providence – the study of sovereignty, superintendence, or agency of God over events in people's lives and throughout history.
- Ecclesiology (sometimes a subsection of missiology)—the study of the Christian Church, including the institutional structure, sacraments and practices (especially the worship of God) thereof
- Mariology – area of theology concerned with Mary, the Mother of Jesus Christ.
- Missiology (sometimes a subsection of ecclesiology) – God's will in the world, missions, evangelism, etc.
- Pneumatology – the study of the Holy Spirit, sometimes also 'geist' as in Hegelianism and other philosophico-theological systems
- Protology - the study of first things, such as God's creation of the universe.
- Soteriology – the study of the nature and means of salvation in Christianity. May include hamartiology (the study of sin), God's Law and the Gospel (the study of the relationship between the Divine Law and divine grace, justification, and sanctification.)
- Theological anthropology – the study of humanity, especially as it relates to the divine.
- Theology proper – the study of God's attributes, nature, and relation to the world; may include:
  - Theodicy – attempts at reconciling the existence of evil and suffering in the world with the nature and justice of God.
  - Apophatic theology – negative theology which seeks to describe God by negation (e.g., immutable, impassible ). It is the discussion of what God is not, or the investigation of how language about God breaks down. Apophatic theology often is contrasted with "Cataphatic theology".

==== A traditional pattern ====
In many Christian seminaries, the four Great Departments of Theology are:

1. Exegetical theology
2. Historical theology
3. Systematic theology
4. Practical theology

The four departments can usefully be subdivided in the following way:
1. Exegetical theology:

- Biblical studies (analysis of the contents of Scripture)
- Biblical introduction
- Canonics (inquiry into how the different books of the Bible came to be collected together)
- Biblical theology (inquiry into how divine revelation progressed over the course of the Bible).

2. Historical theology (study of how Christian theology develops over time):

- The Patristic Period (1st through 8th centuries)
  - The Ante-Nicene Fathers (1st to 3rd centuries)
  - The Nicene Fathers (4th century)
  - The Post-Nicene Fathers (5th to 8th centuries)
- The Middle Ages (8th to 16th centuries)
- The Reformation and Counter-Reformation (16th to 18th centuries)
- The Modern Period (18th to 21st centuries)

3. Systematic theology:

- Prolegomena (first principles)
- Theology proper
  - The existence of God
  - The attributes of God
  - The Trinity
  - Creation
  - Divine Providence
- Doctrine of Man (theological anthropology)
- Christology
- Soteriology
  - Justification
  - Sanctification
- Pneumatology (doctrine of the Holy Spirit)
- Ecclesiology (doctrine of the Church)
- Eschatology and the afterlife.

4. Practical theology:

- Moral theology (Christian ethics and casuistry)
- Ecclesiology
- Pastoral theology
  - Liturgics
  - Homiletics
  - Christian education
  - Christian counseling
- Missiology

=== Eastern Orthodox theology ===
One important branch of Christian theology is Eastern Orthodox theology which has these major teachings

- Scriptural Interpretation
- Dogmatics
- Liturgical Theology and related teleturgics
- Hymnography
- Iconography and related Iconology
- Church history
- Pastoral theology
- Homiletics
- Heresiology
- Patristics per Consensus Patrum
- Ecclesiology
- Sacramental Theology
- Monastic theology
- Holy Canons
- Hagiography
- Christian Ethics
- Exorcism

=== Roman Catholic theology ===
Another important branch of Christian theology is Roman Catholic theology which has these major teachings:

- Biblical canon (involvement of Pope Damasus I [b.305]);
- Absolution (sacerdotal remittance of sin);
- The apostolic succession (i.e., of bishops and the Pope from the original Apostles);
- Christology;
- Ecclesiology since Vatican II;
- Infant Baptism;
- Ecumenism since Vatican II;
- Ecumenical Councils (as means to bring about change or reform);
- Icon veneration;
- Real Presence;
- Liturgy since Vatican II;
- Models of the Church (Avery Dulles);
- Moral Theology/Ethics;
- Natural Law;
- Indulgences (i.e., remissions by the Church of some penalties for sin);
- Mary as defined within Catholic theology (immaculately conceived, Mary as Theotokos [i.e., in Greek, "God-bearer" or "Mother of God"]; as perpetually virgin; the Assumption of Mary);
- The Pope (i.e., Papal Primacy, Papal temporal power, Papal supremacy, and Papal infallibility);
- Purgatory (a "holding place" after death where souls are purified before entering heaven);
- Sacerdotalism (priesthood as intermediary and sacred office; also see priesthood (Catholic Church), Mass (liturgy), and priesthood in Vatican II);
- The Sacraments;
- Sainthood, canonization and beatification;
- Tradition (i.e., its authority relative to Scripture and role of Tradition in Church Councils).

=== Controversial movements ===
Christians have had theological disagreements since the time of Jesus. Theological disputes have given rise to many schisms and different Christian denominations, sects and movements.

==== Pre-Reformation ====
- Alogi – rejected the doctrine of the Logos
- Arianism – doctrines rejecting Christ's divinity in relation to the God the Father but proposed either "similar in substance", "similar", or "dissimilar" as the correct alternative
- Antidicomarianites and related Psilanthropism
- Augustinianism - strong assertion of original sin, important doctrine in the Roman Catholic Church.
- Apollinarianism - Belief that Jesus had a human body and lower soul (the seat of the emotions) but a divine mind
- Collyridianism - The belief that the Trinity consists of the Father, Son, and Mary, and that the Son results from the marital union between the other two.
- Conciliarism - emphasis that Popes were subservient to ecumenical councils
- Docetism - belief that historical, human bodily existence of Christ was mere semblance without any true reality
- Donatism - rigorist group holding that the church must be a church of saints, not sinners and that sacraments administered by traditores were invalid.
- Dyophysitism - doctrines regarding dual natures of Christ's divinity and humanity within single person, culminated with Neo-Chalcedonism
- Dyoenergism which was opposed to Monoenergism
- Dyothelitism which was opposed to Monothelitism
- Free Spirit - belief that its believer could communicate directly with God and did not need the Christian church for intercession.
- Gnosticism – Broad classification for beliefs that generally rejected the goodness of the physical to emphasize the spiritual, also emphasized salvation through "hidden teachings."
- Hussitism – Broad classification for beliefs that generally originated from early 15th century Bohemian Reformation that included Utraquists, Taborites, and later Moravian Church
- Iconoclasm - belief that the veneration of icons was idolatry
- Iconodulism - belief that the veneration of icons is proper
- Judaizers - faction of the Jewish Christians, both of Jewish and non-Jewish origins, who regarded the Levitical laws as still binding on all Christians, includes Ebionitism and Nazorean
- Manichaeism - A major dualistic religion brought by Mani stating that good and evil are equally powerful, and that material things are evil.
- Marcionism – dualist doctrine taught by Marcion of Sinope that God of the Old Testament is different from God of New Testament
- Monarchianism – doctrines regarding sole divinity of the Father at the exclusion of Christ's and Holy Spirit's divinity, related to Adoptionism and Subordinationism, Pneumatomachi along with Arianism
- Monophysitism – doctrines regarding Christ's divinity, in opposition to dyophysitism (included Eutychianism, Aphthartodocetae, Agnoetae, Barsanuphians, and Gaianites)
- Miaphysitism - doctrine of the Oriental Orthodox Churches
- Monoenergism and related Monothelitism - developed as a compromise between miaphysitism with dyophysitism
- Montanism - encouraged ecstatic prophesying and believed that their prophecies superseded and fulfilled the doctrines proclaimed by the Apostles.
- Nestorianism - doctrine of the Church of the East. However, the Church of the East itself considers this label as a pejorative term and instead opts for the term 'dyophysitism of Theodore of Mopsuestia'
- Nontrinitarianism - any form of teachings that maintain God is not Trinity (including Unitarianism, Binitarianism, and Tritheism)
- Novatianism - Third-century belief that rejected possibility of readmission into communion for the lapsed
- Occamism - doctrine devised by William of Ockham
- Palamism - doctrine of the Eastern Orthodox Church
- Petrobrusians - considered the New Testament epistles to have a subordinate authority, questioning their apostolic origin, and rejected the authority of the Old Testament
- Paulicianism – medieval dualist movement that believed the material world is evil, and the only way to salvation is to reject it (evolved into Tondrakianism, Bogomilism, Bosnian Church, Pasagians, and Catharism)
- Pelagianism – denial of original sin and helplessness of sinner to save himself, strong affirmation of libertarian free will
- Semi-Pelagianism – developed as a compromise between Pelagianism and Augustinianism, the Eastern Orthodox Church is accused of believing in it by Protestantism.
- Proto-Protestantism - and related Medieval Restorationism (included Arnoldists, Berengarians, Joachimites, Apostolic Brethren and then, the Dulcinians)
- Quartodecimanism – Easter controversy
- Sabellianism – doctrines regarding the Trinity, also known as "modalism" or "patripassianism."
- Scotism - doctrine of the Roman Catholic Church devised by Duns Scotus
- Thomism - doctrine of the Roman Catholic Church devised by Thomas Aquinas
- Universalism – In various forms, the belief that all people will ultimately be reconciled with God; most famously defended by Origen.

==== Post-Reformation ====
Because the Reformation promoted the idea that Christians could expound their own views of theology based on the notion of "sola scriptura," the Bible alone, many theological distinctions have occurred between the various Protestant denominations. The differences between many of the denominations are relatively minor; however, and this has helped ecumenical efforts in recent times.

- Abrahamites
- Adventism – Typified by the Seventh-day Adventist Church.
- Amyraldism – Four-Point Calvinism
- Anabaptism – Rejection of Paedobaptism in favor of Credobaptism
- Anglicanism – English branch of Reformation
- Anglo-Catholicism – High church theology of Anglicanism.
- Antinomianism
- Apocalypticism
- Arminianism – affirms man's freedom to accept or reject God's gift of salvation; identified with Dutch Reformed theologian Jacobus Arminius, developed by Hugo Grotius, defended by the Remonstrants, and popularized by John Wesley. Key doctrine of Methodist churches, adopted by many Baptists and some Congregationalists.
- Armstrongism
- Branhamism
- Brethrenism: Anabaptist-Pietist, with Open and Exclusive streams
- Calvinism – System of soteriology advanced by John Calvin
- Catacomb Church
- Cessationism – belief that in some sense supernatural miracles already ceases today opposed by continuationism
- Charismaticism – Movement in many Protestant and some Catholic churches that emphasizes the gifts of the Spirit and the continual working of the Holy Spirit within the body of Christ; often associated with glossolalia (i.e., speaking in tongues) and divine healing.
- Congregationalism – Form of governance used in Congregationalist, Baptist, and Pentecostal churches in which each congregation is self-governing and independent of all others.
- Counter-Reformation (or Catholic Reformation): The Roman Catholic response to the Protestant Reformation (see also Council of Trent).
- Creation Spirituality – Panentheist theology.
- Deism – The general doctrine that no faith is necessary for justified belief in God's existence or the doctrine that God does not intervene in earthly affairs (contrasts with Fideism).
- Dispensationalism – Belief in a conservative, Biblically literalist hermeneutic and philosophy of history that, by stressing the dichotomy between Israel and the Church, rejects supersessionism (commonly referred to as "replacement theology").
- Evangelicalism – Typically conservative, predominantly Protestant outlook that prioritizes evangelism above all or most other activities of the Church (see also neo-evangelicalism).
- Erastianism – related to Gallicanism, Regalism, and Febronianism, similar to older Caesaropapism.
- Eastern Protestant Christianity includes P'ent'ay and Saint Thomas Anglicans
- Feeneyism
- Fideism – The doctrine that faith is irrational, that God's existence transcends logic, and that all knowledge of God is on the basis of faith (contrasts with Deism).
- Holiness Movement
- Imiaslavie
- Inochentism
- Jansenism
- Keswickianism – Protestant theological tradition within Evangelical Christianity that espoused a distinct teaching on the doctrines of entire sanctification, healing, and spiritual gifts.
- Labadists
- Latitudinarianism: Broad church theology of Anglicanism.
- Low church – Puritanical / Evangelical theology of Anglicanism
- Lutheranism - System of soteriology advanced by Martin Luther
- Methodism – Form of church governance and doctrine used in the Methodist Church.
- Modernism – Belief that truth changes, so doctrine must evolve in light of new information or trends.
- Molinism – Middle Knowledge
- Latter Day Saint movement (Mormonism) – Belief that the Book of Mormon and others to be additional divine scriptures; belief in living prophets; generally reject the Nicene Creed and other early creeds.
- Neonomianism
- New Apostolic Reformation
- New Thought – Movement based on 19th century New England belief in positive thinking. Several denominations arose from it including Unity Church, and Religious Science.
- Nonconformism – Advocacy of religious liberty; includes Quakers, Methodists, Baptists, Congregationalists and Salvationists.
- Old Believers
- Oneness Pentecostalism
- Pentecostalism
- Pietism – A stream of Lutheranism placing renewed emphasis on the Bible and a universal priesthood of all believers.
- Presbyterianism – Form of governance used in Presbyterian and Reformed churches.
- Puritanism: Movement to cleanse Anglicanism of any "ritualistic" aspects
- Quietism
- Renovationism
- Restoration Movement – 19th century attempt to return to a New Testament model of the Church
- Restorationism (Christian primitivism) – The doctrine that most of the modern Church is apostate; includes the Millerites, Seventh-day Adventists, Jehovah's Witnesses, and Latter Day Saints
- Sabbatarianism
- Sacramentarians
- Salvation Army – An offshoot of the Methodist Church known for its charitable activities
- Socinianism
- Supersessionism – Belief that the Christian Church, the body of Christ, is the only elect people of God in the new covenant age (see also covenant theology)
- Spiritual Christianity
- Swedenborgianism
- Tractarianism – Oxford Movement. It led to Anglo-Catholicism.
- Ultramontanism – A movement within 19th-century Roman Catholicism to emphasize papal authority, particularly in the wake of the French Revolution and the secularization of the state
- Unitarianism – Rejects a holy "Trinity" and also the divinity of Christ, (related to Biblical unitarianism, Polish Brethren, and American Unitarian Association).

==== Contemporary theological movements ====
In addition to the movements listed above, the following are some of the movements found amongst Christian theologians

- Analytic theology
- Black theology
- Anarchism
- Christian Reconstructionism
- Christian Existentialism
- Covenant Theology
- Confessing Movement
- Dalit theology (a form of liberation theology developed in India)
- Dominion theology
- Emerging church
- Exvangelical
- Evangelical left
- Feminist theology
- Fundamentalism
- Holocaust theology (In response to the horrors of the Holocaust especially in relation to Theodicy)
- Integralism
- Independent Sacramental Movement
- Jesuism
- Liberation Theology
- Liturgical Movement
- Narrative theology – studying a narrative presentation of the faith rather than dogmatic development.
- Neo-orthodoxy (also known as "dialectical theology" and "crisis theology", stemming from the works of Søren Kierkegaard and Karl Barth)
- Neo-scholasticism
- Nouvelle théologie
- New Church
- New Covenant Theology
- Open Theism – A rejection of the exhaustive foreknowledge of God, by attributing it to Greek philosophy.
- Paleo-Orthodoxy
- Personalism
- Post-evangelicalism
- Postliberal theology
- Postmodern theology
- Process theology
- Progressive theology
- Prosperity theology
- Queer Theology
- Radical orthodoxy
- Quakerism
- Restoration Movement
- Revisionist theology
- Scriptural reasoning
- Social Gospel
- Southern Baptist traditionalism
- Transcendental Theology
- Theonomy

== Christian theology organizations ==
=== Evangelical Theological Society (ETS) ===
ETS is an academic society of Biblical scholars, teachers, pastors, students, and others involved in evangelical scholarship.

=== International Academy of Practical Theology (IAPT) ===
The purpose of the International Academy of Practical Theology is the study of and critical reflection on practical theological thought and action. This critical reflection should be pursued with attention to the various historical and cultural contexts in which practical theology is done. Out of respect for the diversity of these contexts, the academy seeks to promote international, interracial, and ecumenical dialogue and understanding.

== See also ==
- Biblical canon
- Eastern Orthodox – Roman Catholic theological differences
- Eastern Orthodox – Roman Catholic ecclesiastical differences
- Christian ecumenism
- Christian worship
- Ecumenism
- Heresy
- List of Christian theologians
- List of Methodist theologians
- Protestant Reformation
- Roman Catholicism
- Vatican II
- Christian Theology
- Wesleyan Quadrilateral
- Word of Faith
