= De sectis =

Start of De sectis in the 15th-century manuscript Plut 4.12. The rubric (in red ink) at the top, naming "Leontius Scholasticus of Byzantium" as the author is very faded.

De sectis ("About the Heresies") is a heresiography, a treatise cataloguing and critiquing heresy in Christianity, written sometime between the 6th and 8th centuries by a certain Theodore, possibly Theodore of Raithu or Theodore Abu Qurrah. Often misattributed to Leontius of Byzantium, leading to its author sometimes being called Pseudo-Leontius, it was originally written in Greek and also survives in a Georgian translation. Its perspective is Chalcedonian.

== Authorship and date ==
The title of the work given in the critical edition is:

Σχόλια Λεοντίου σχολαστίκου Βυζαντίου ἀπὸ φωνῆς θεοδώρου τοῦ θεοφιλεσάτου Ἀββᾶ καὶ σοφωτάτου φιλοσόφου, τήν τε θείαν καὶ ἐξωτικὴν ὠς χρὴ φιλοσοφήσαντος γραφήν

which identifies the work as a type of scholia attributed to a certain Leontius, scholastic of Byzantium, and being "from the dictation of" a certain Theodore, abbot and philosopher.

The meaning of the title and the identification of Leontius and Theodore have been heavily debated. Friedrich Loofs thought that Leontius was the author and Theodore a mere editor. This opinion was followed by Michel van Esbroeck and Bernard Outtier. These authors attributed the text to Leontius of Byzantium, sometimes identified with Leontius of Jerusalem, and placed its composition in the mid-6th century.

The conclusion of Loofs was based on an unusual reading of ἀπὸ φωνῆς, which is usually take to indicate that Leontius "received the substance of the treatise from the dictation" of Theodore, making Theodore the primary author and Leontius the redactor. Theresia Hainthaler also regards the title as indicating that Leontius "took notes in the lectures" of Theodore. Marcel Richard argues that this literal meaning of ἀπὸ φωνῆς was superseded by the 8th century by a more generic sense of authorial ascription, meaning that the title attributes authorship to Theodore directly. Moreover, Leontius is not mentioned in ever manuscript, whereas Theodore is. The Georgian translation neither mentions Leontius nor translates ἀπὸ φωνῆς literally.

Today, the attribution to Leontius of Byzantium is rejected. It was current by the 8th century, when De sectis is cited as his in the Doctrina Patrum. Maryse Waegeman calls the unknown author Pseudo-Leontius Byzantinus. J. P. Junglas argued that the name Leontius of Byzantium is authentic but refers to a student of the author (Theodore) and not the more famous Leontius.

If the author's name was Theodore, as generally accepted, his identity is less clear. He may be the early 7th-century writer Theodore of Raithu, although Hainthaler gives reasons why such an identification is unlikely. One manuscript is explicit in idenfitying Abbot Theodore as Theodore Abu Qurrah (740–820), which Waegeman considers a possibility, but van Esbroeck rejected as anachronistic. The author, or perhaps editor, must have been writing after 581, since he names Patriarch Eulogius of Alexandria. The place of writing depends largely on the identity of the author. On the basis of internal evidence, arguments have been made for Sinai or Constantinople.

== Structure and contents ==
Start of De sectis in the 15th-century manuscript Madilensis 4798

De sectis is divided into ten "actions" (praxeis or actiones). In Actio I, the author identifies his subject: "We propose to deal with the subject of heresies". The first five actiones are primarily historical background down to the Council of Chalcedon in 451. The last five are polemics directed against the anti-Chalcedonians.

Actio I begins by defining the Christologically relevant philosophical terms ousia, physis, hypostasis and prosopon. It then gives a brief history of humanity from Creation to the Resurrection, followed by a statement of faith and an account of four early heresise: Arianism, Sabellianism, Nestorianism and Eutychianism.

Actiones II–V are a history of heresy. Three periods are distinguished: from the Resurrection to Constantine the Great, from Constantine to the Council of Chalcedon and from Chalcedon to the author's own day. Actio II establishes the biblical canon and treats Judaism and Samaritanism as nontrinitarian heresies. The canon of the Old Testament contains 22 books. Esther is not included. The book of Lamentations and the Letter of Jeremiah are probably included under Jeremiah, since Baruch certainly is. This canon is equivalent to the Tanakh minus Esther with additions to Jeremiah. Actio III covers Manichaeism, Sabellianism and Arius and Paul of Samosata as heresiarchs in particular. Actio IV is a general history of heresy down to Chalcedon with more discussion of Nestorianism, Eutychianism, Apollinarianism and Macedonianism. Actio V discusses Chalcedon itself and the heretics who rejected it: Severians, Julianists, Agnoetae and Tritheitae.

Actiones VI–VIII, respresenting a third of the work, are a defence of Chalcedonianism. Actio VI responds to historical arguments against Chalcedon, Actio VII responds to abstract philosophical arguments and Actio VIII responds to arguments based on the citations of the Church Fathers. Actio VII treats John Philoponus not as a Miaphysite but as a Tritheist. Actio IX is a supplement to Actiones VI–VIII. It contains a patristic florilegium with citations from Athanasius of Alexandria, Gregory of Nazianzus, Gregory of Nyssa, Ambrose of Milan, Augustine of Hippo and Cyril of Alexandria. Actio X responds to the Gaianites, Origenists and Agnoetae.

== Manuscripts and editions ==
There are at least fourteen known manuscripts of De sectis, the earliest dating to 1111 and the latest to 1649. The earliest edition was that printed by Johannes Leunclavius in 1578, based on a single one of these, a defective 16th-century copy.

A Georgian translation of De sectis was made by Arsen Vachesdze (died 1127). The Georgian version is attributed to Theodore Abu Qurrah. It is preserved in several manuscripts, the most complete of which is S-1463. An edition of the Georgian text was published by Leila Datiashvili in 1980. A critical edition of the Greek text by Maryse Waegeman appeared in 1982.

== Bibliography ==
- Daley, Brian E., ed. (2017). Leontius of Byzantium: Complete Works. Oxford University Press.
- Gleede, Benjamin (2013). "Der Traktat De sectis des Abbas Theodor: Eine unvollendete Handreichung zur Widerlegung der διακρινομενοι". In Dmitirij Bumazhnov (ed.). Christliches Ägypten in der spätantiken Zeit: Akten der 2. Tübinger Tagung zum Christlichen Orient (7.–8. Dezember 2007). Mohr Siebeck. pp. 179–216.
- Hainthaler, Theresia (1995) [1989]. "The Chalcedonian Writing De Sectis". In Aloys Grillmeier; Theresia Hainthaler (eds.). Christ in Christian Tradition, Volume 2, Part 2: The Church of Constantionple in the Sixth Century. Translated by Pauline Allen; John Cawte. Westminster John Knox Press. pp. 493–502.
- Lang, Uwe Michael (1998). "The Date of the Treatise De Sectis Revisited". Orientalia Lovaniensia Periodica. 29: 89–98.
- Mgebrishvili, Nino (2024). "The Problem of the Authorship of De Sectis and the Old Georgian Translation of the Treatise Presented in Dogmatikon of Arsen Vachesdze". Spekali. 18 (1). doi:10.55804/jtsuSPEKALI-18-20.
- Rees, Silas (1939). "The De Sectis: A Treatise Attributed to Leontius of Byzantium". The Journal of Theological Studies. 40 (160): 346–360. JSTOR 23953452.
- Richard, Marcel (1939). "Le traité De sectis de Léonce de Byzance". Revue d'Histoire Ecclésiastique. 35 (4): 695–723.
- Van Esbroeck, Michel (1985). "La date et l'auteur du De Sectis attribué à Léonce de Byzance". In C. Laga; J. A. Munitiz; L. van Rompay (eds.). After Chalcedon: Studies in Theology and Church History Offered to Professor Albert Van Roey for his Seventieth Birthday. Peeters. pp. 415–424.
- Waegeman, Maryse (1976). "The Text Tradition of the Treatise De Sectis (Ps. Leontius Byzantinus)". L'Antiquité Classique. 45 (1): 190–196.
- Waegeman, Maryse (1981). "The Old Testament Canon in the Treatise De Sectis". L'Antiquité Classique (1): 813–818.
- Waegeman, Maryse (1982). Het Traktaat De Sectis (Ps. Leontius Byzantinus): tekstkritische uitgave en vertaling (PhD diss.). University of Ghent.
