= Theodore of Raithu =

Theodore of Raithu (Note: Also spelled Raithou, Rhaithu, Rhaithou.) (fl. late 6th or early 7th century) was a Christian theologian considered the last of the Neo-Chalcedonians.

Theodore was a monk at Raithu on the Sinai Peninsula, active after 550. Some have identified him with the Theodore who was the bishop of nearby Pharan in the early 7th century and died before 625. The bishop advocated monenergism at the beginning of the monothelite controversy.

Theodore wrote in Greek. His major work is the Preparation, (Note: Προπαρασκευή, Proparaskeue; Latin Praeparatio, also translated Basic Indoctrination.) which seeks to reconcile the terminology of Cyril of Alexandria (d. 441) with the canons of the Council of Chalcedon (451) as against the interpretations of the anti-Chalcedonian monophysites. It is divided into two parts. The first is a list of heresies of Christology from Mani to Severus of Antioch with their refutations, wherein he attacks the views of Julian of Halicarnassus and presents Chalcedonianism as a middle ground between monophysitism and Nestorianism. The second is a philosophical presentation of Chalcedonian Christology in the tradition of Greek dialectic.

Theodore may also be the author of the treatise On Sects, which is usually attributed to Leontius Scholasticus in the manuscripts. (Note: Not to be confused with Leontius of Byzantium or Leontius of Jerusalem) It also survives in a Georgian translation and has also been attributed to Theodore Abu Qurrah. A Compendium of Logic in the tradition of Aristotelianism is also sometimes attributed in the manuscripts to Theodore of Raithu or Theodore of Pharan.

== Bibliography ==
- Baldwin, Barry; Kazhdan, Alexander (1991). "Theodore of Raithou". In Kazhdan, Alexander (ed.). The Oxford Dictionary of Byzantium. Oxford and New York: Oxford University Press. ISBN 0-19-504652-8.
- Cross, F. L.; Livingstone, E. A., eds. (2009) [2005]. "Theodore of Raïthu". The Oxford Dictionary of the Christian Church (3rd rev. ed.). Oxford University Press.
- Proksch, Nicholas (2025). Theodore of Raithu's Preparation: Biblical Backbround for Metaphysical Terms (Doctoral dissertation). Concordia Seminary.
