= Leontius, presbyter of Constantinople =

Start of a sermon by Leontius

Leontius was a presbyter active in Constantinople in the middle of the sixth century, probably during the patriarchate of Eutychius (r. 552–565). Several homilies are attributed to him and nothing is known of his life, except for what can be gathered from the homilies themselves and their attribution in the manuscripts. The connection of Leontius to Constantinople is apparenty from the frequency of references to the Byzantine emperor in his preaching, and from his reference to the Constantinopolitan heretics Marathonius, a Pneumatomachian, and Sabbatius, a Novatianist.

Several men known as Leontius were writing theology in the sixth century, which has sometimes led to confusion. The homilist is to be distinguished from Leontius of Byzantium, Leontius of Jerusalem, and the "Pseudo-Leontius" who wrote De sectis.

Eleven homilies (I–XI) are attributed to Leontius in the manuscripts, but three others (XII–XIV) have been assigned to him by his modern editors. In the manuscripts, these last are attributed to John Chrysostom. One of Leontius's authentic sermons has been misattributed to Athanasius by modern readers. Leontius preached Homily I on the Nativity of John the Baptist, II and III on Palm Sunday, IV–VII during Holy Week, VIII and IX on Easter, X on Mid-Pentecost, XI and XIII on Pentecost, XII on Christmas and XIV on the Feast of the Transfiguration.

== Bibliography ==
- Allen, Pauline; Datema, Cornelis (1991). Leontius: Presbyter of Constantinople: Fourteen Homilies. Brill.
- Aubineau, Michel (1974). "Un Ps.-Athanase, In Lazarum (e Vat. Ottob. gr. 14), restitué à Léonce de Constantinople". The Journal of Theological Studies. New. 25 (2): 442–447. JSTOR 23958416.
- Daley, Brian (1976). "The Origenism of Leontius of Byzantium". The Journal of Theological Studies. New. 27 (2): 333–369. JSTOR 23961914.
