= John of Caesarea (theologian) =

John of Caesarea, also called John the Grammarian, was a sixth-century Byzantine priest and theologian. His biography is unknown, nor is the origin of his name, either Caesarea Palaestina or Caesarea Mazaca. He is usually considered the first Neo-Chalcedonian writer. He may be the same person as John the Orthodox, author of Dialogue with a Manichaean.

Between 514 and 518 John wrote his Apologia Concilii Chalcedonensis, an apologetic for the Council of Chalcedon, in which he tried to reconcile its ideas with those of Cyril of Alexandria and criticised the position of Severus of Antioch. Against monophysitism, John put forward the "characteristic hypostasis" of Christ, whereby the human and divine natures were uniquely united in one person. Severus responded with a Refutation, which survives only in Syriac.

John's other works include tracts and sermons against the doctrines of the Akephaloi, the Aphthartodocetae and the Manichaeans, and an exegesis of the Gospel of John.

== Sources ==
- Kazhdan, Alexander P. "John of Caesarea". The Oxford Dictionary of Byzantium, ed. Alexander P. Kazhdan. Oxford: Oxford University Press, 2005.
