= Eulogius of Alexandria =

Egyptian saint

Saint Eulogius of Alexandria
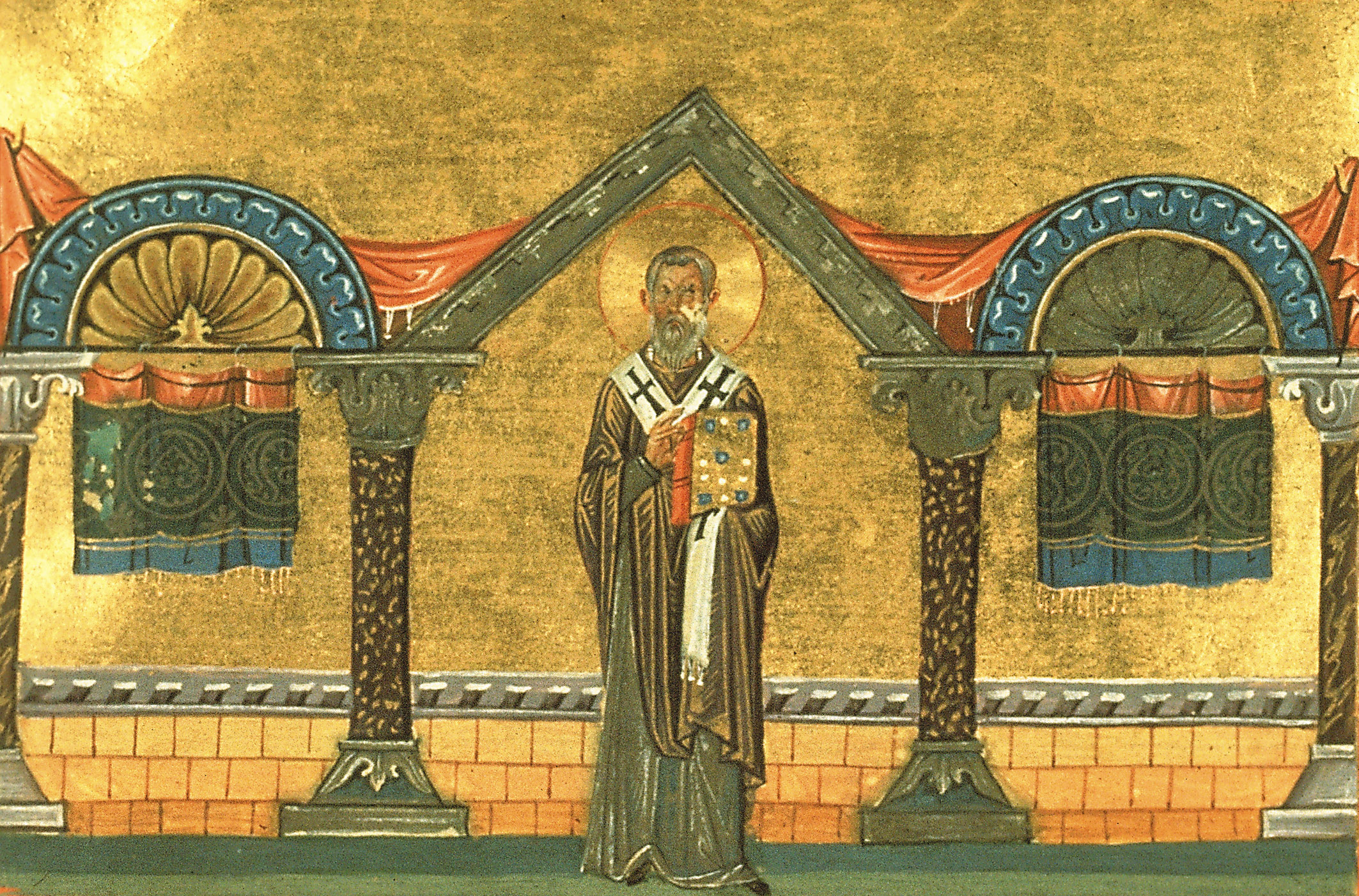
- Miniature from the Menologion of Basil II

Bishop and Confessor
- Born: Syria
- Died: September 13, 608
- Venerated in: Catholic Church; Eastern Orthodox Church
- Feast: June 13

Eulogius of Alexandria (Ancient Greek: Εὐλόγιος) was Greek Patriarch of that see from about 580 to 608. He is regarded as a saint, with a feast day of June 13.

== Life ==
Eulogius was first igumen of the monastery of the Mother of God in Antioch. He was a successful combatant of various phases of Monophysitism. He was a warm friend of Pope Gregory the Great, who corresponded with him, and received from that pope many flattering expressions of esteem and admiration.

Eulogius refuted the Novatians, some communities of which ancient sect still existed in his diocese, and vindicated the hypostatic union of the two natures in Christ, against both Nestorius and Eutyches. Cardinal Baronius says that Gregory wished Eulogius to survive him, recognizing in him the voice of truth.

It has been said that he restored for a brief period to the Church of Alexandria life and youthful vigour.

Besides the above works and a commentary against various sects of Monophysites (Severans, Theodosians, Gaianites and Acephali) he left eleven discourses in defence of Pope Leo I and the Council of Chalcedon, also a work against the Agnoetae, submitted by him before publication to Pope Gregory I, who after some observations authorized it unchanged. With exception of one sermon and a few fragments, all the writings of Eulogius have perished.

== See also ==
- Minuscule 715

Preceded by John IV	Greek Patriarch of Alexandria; 581–607	Succeeded by Theodore I
