= Phantasiasts =

Pejorative label for Miaphysite sects

Phantasiasts (from Greek φαντασία, phantasia, appearance, phantasm) was a label applied to several distinct Christian heresies by their opponents in late antiquity. The term appears in Greek and Syriac writings mainly to refer to extreme forms of Miaphysitism. The term evokes the second-century heresy of Docetism. Both movements were accused of denying the full reality of Jesus's humanity.

The first targets of the label were the Eutychians, the followers of Eutyches. In a letter read before the Council of Chalcedon (451), Pope Leo the Great castigates the phantasmatici Christiani (Christian phantasmatics) in a clear reference to the Eutychians. Moderate Miaphysites like Timothy Aelurus, Philoxenus of Mabbug and Severus of Antioch also labelled the Eutychians phantasiasts. One Miaphysite oath administered to those returning to Miaphysitism from heresy called for the abjuration of the Phantasiasts. The use of the label Phantasiasts by both Dyophysites and moderate Miaphysites indicates the extreme nature of the position relative to orthodox theologies.

In the middle of the sixth century, the term Phantasiasts was applied to the Aphthartodocetae, the followers of Julian of Halicarnassus, the theological foe of Severus of Antioch. It was in this sense that Patriarch Sergius I of Antioch used the term in the late 550s when writing to the Miaphysite bishops of Persia about receiving back those who had lapsed into the "heresy of Julian the Phantasiast". The poet George of Pisidia also describes Phantasiasts in his poem celebrating the emperor Heraclius's campaign of 622 against the Persians.

The term was also applied to the Gaianites (latter-day Aphthartodocetae) and in this sense was used into the ninth century.
