= Letter to the Antiochenes =

Letter supposedly addressed by Athanasius of Alexandria to the church of Antioch

The Letter to the Antiochenes, later known erroneously as the Sermo maior de fide, is a letter supposedly addressed by Athanasius of Alexandria to the church of Antioch. It is not authentic but is regarded as Pseudo-Athanasian. Originally written in Greek, only excerpts are preserved in that language, as well as fragments in Latin and Syriac. Nearly the entire text is known, however, in Armenian.

The Greek text is known mainly from catenae, including the Laurentian Catena. It is quoted in Latin by Facundus of Hermiane and Pope Gelasius I, but a complete Latin translation may never have existed. In Syriac, it is known from quotations in Severus of Antioch and in a patristic florilegium from the Church of the East. A complete Syriac translation may never have existed. The Armenian translation, which is missing its ending and some material known from the Greek fragments, is preserved in two manuscripts of the Mekhitarist Monastery in Vienna: Codex 648, a 14th-century copy in bolorgir script, and Codex 629, a 19th-century copy in notragir script. The Armenian translation was made directly from the Greek, perhaps in the 7th century. The heading of the Armenian text identifies the work as written against the Arians:

Letter of S[aint] Athanasius, Archbishop of Alexandria, to the Church of the Antiochenes, concerning (its) variant theology and the analysis of (its) works, which was addressed to the hostile and, in their opinions, heretical followers of Arius.

According to Bas ter Haar Romeny, the Letter is a deliberate forgery responding to the Apollinarians, who composed their own Pseudo-Athanasian forgeries. It has been attributed to Marcellus of Ancyra, but this is disputed.

== Bibliography ==
- Casey, Robert Pierce (1934). "The Pseudo-Athanasian Sermo maior de fide". The Journal of Theological Studies. Old. 35 (140): 394–395. doi:10.1093/jts/os-XXXV.140.394.
- Casey, Robert Pierce, ed. (1947). The Armenian Version of the Pseudo-Athanasian Letter to the Antiochenes and of the Expositio fidei. University of Pennsylvania Press.
- Lienhard, Joseph T. (1982). "Marcellus of Ancyra in Modern Research". Theological Studies. 43 (3): 486–503.
- Romeny, Bas ter Haar (2010). "Athanasius in Syriac". Church History and Religious Culture. 90 (2): 225–256. JSTOR 23923398.
