= Gaianus of Alexandria =

Patriarch of Alexandria in 535 CE

Gaianus (also spelled Gaian or Gainas) was the Patriarch of Alexandria for three months in 535.

Following the death of Patriarch Timothy IV on 7 February 535, there was a double election to fill the vacant patriarchate. The two main parties in Alexandria at the time were the Severans, followers of Severus of Antioch, and the Julianists, followers of Julian of Halicarnassus. The former elected the deacon Theodosius while the latter elected Gaianus, who had been archdeacon under Timothy IV. According to Leontius of Byzantium, "the magnates of the city were with Theodosius; the people with Gaianus."

The rival patriarchs were consecrated on the same day, 9 or 11 February. Gaianus' consecration was performed by Julian of Halicarnassus. A groundswell of popular support for Gaianus forced Theodosius to go into exile before even the funeral of Timothy IV had been celebrated, according to Leontius. According to Zacharias Rhetor, Gaianus was able to maintain his position for three months. Liberatus of Carthage, more exactly, gives him 103 days, which places the end of his rule on 23 or 25 May. An imperial envoy, Narses, was sent to investigate the disputed election. He ruled in favour of Theodosius and Gaianus was exiled to Carthage, according to Liberatus, "by judges". According to Michael the Syrian, writing several centuries later, the riots that followed the banishment of Gaianus left 3,000 dead. Theodosius returned to the city two months later, in late July or early August. Narses, who had 6,000 troops under his command in Egypt, had to leave 2,000 in Alexandria for Theodosius' protection.

The History of the Patriarchs of Alexandria claims that Gaianus and Theodosius eventually reconciled, but this seems unlikely in light of the persistence of the Gaianite faction in Alexandria. He was later moved to Sardinia, where he died.

Preceded by Theodosius I	Patriarch of Alexandria; 535	Succeeded by Paul
