= Joseph Lebon (disambiguation) =

Joseph Le Bon may refer to:

- Joseph Le Bon (29 September 1765 – 10 October 1795), a French politician
- Joseph Lebon (Tamines, 1879–1957), a Belgian priest and professor of theology at the University of Louvain
