= De virginitate =

De virginitate ('On Virginity') may refer to:

- De virginitate, work by Gregory of Nyssa
- De virginitate, work by Pseudo-Athanasius
- De virginitate, poem by Venantius Fortunatus
- De virginitate, either of two works by Aldhelm:
  - Carmen de virginitate, a poem
  - De laude virginitatis, work in prose
