= Theodosians (miaphysite faction) =

The Theodosians, also known as Severians or Severans, were a faction within the non-Chalcedonian Christian movement in the 6th and 7th centuries, characterised by their adherence to the theological views of Severus of Antioch and Theodosius I of Alexandria. Out of all the miaphysite sects, which numbered over 20, the Theodosians were the largest, the most mainstream, and relatively close in their theology to Chalcedonian Christianity. Their faction eventually became the Coptic Orthodox Church and the Syriac Orthodox Church. The Armenian Apostolic Church initially espoused a form of aphthartodocetism at the 555 Second Council of Dvin, but later adopted Theodosianism at the 726 Council of Manzikert.

== History ==
The Council of Chalcedon in 451 faced immediate opposition, especially in Egypt and Syria. However, this opposition was divided into many factions, united by little more than their acceptance of Ephesus and rejection of Chalcedon. These included the Dioscorians (who rejected every pope since Dioscorus's death in 454, due to disagreements with Timothy Ailuros), the Akephaloi (who rejected the Henotikon and broke off in 482), the Agnoetai (who believed that Jesus, as a man, shared human ignorance), the tritheists (like John Philoponus and Theodora's grandson Athanasius), and many other sects which were listed by Timothy of Constantinople.

In 520, while Severus of Antioch was the main spokesman of non-Chalcedonian Christianity, Julian of Halicarnassus claimed that Christ's body was incorruptible since his Incarnation, and that therefore his humanity was different to ours. Severus corrected him, arguing that Christ's body only became incorruptible following his Resurrection. Julian responded with insults, and soon the Miaphysite movement was divided between Severians and Julianists (who were also known as Aphthartodocetae or Phantasists). From then on, Severus had to fight on two fronts: on one side against the Chalcedonians, and on the other against the Aphthartodocetae.

When Pope Timothy IV of Alexandria died in 535, the Severians elected Theodosius to succeed him. However, he was deposed by the Julianists even before Timothy's funeral had ended, and Julian of Halicarnassus instead appointed Gaianus as patriarch. The imperial envoy Narses, (Note: The Claremont Coptic Encyclopedia identifies this Narses as the one who died in 543, but the Oxford Classical Dictionary identifies him as the one who died in 573.) at the instigation of Empress Theodora, had Gaianus banished and Theodosius reinstalled at the cost of 3000 dead Gaianites. Thus, the Severians became also known as Theodosians, and the Julianists as Gaianites. During this period, the Theodosians were seen as the "imperial" faction, while the Gaianites were seen as representatives of the "Coptic national spirit". According to the tract De sectis, "The magnates of the city were with Theodosius; the demes with Gaianus". The Alexandrians rioted in support of Gaianus, while Theodosius was apparently only able to keep his position with the help of Narses' troops. However, by the reign of Justin II the Gaianites had lost significant ground to the Theodosians and were no longer the majority.

Some Julianists from Syria, who were excommunicated by the mainstream Severians, sought protection from the Armenian catholicos Nerses II. He consecrated for them a bishop named Abdisho, and held the Second Council of Dvin in 555. Alongside condemnations of Eutyches, the Three Chapters, Nestorius, the Tome of Leo, the Council of Chalcedon, and so on, it also condemned Severus of Antioch for teaching that Christ's body is corruptible, essentially adopting a form of Julianism. This condemnation remained an official part of the Armenian church's doctrine until the Council of Manzikert in 726, but Armenian scholars do not agree on its significance.

Paul the Black, who in 564 was ordained by Theodosius as the Patriarch of Antioch, was expelled from his see by Syrian tritheists who saw him as a representative of the Theodosians. He took refuge with the Ghassanid phylarchs al-Harith and al-Mundhir, then in 567 he went to Egypt and ordained Theodore of Rhamnis in Scetes as its next Patriarch. However, the Egyptians were unhappy with his selection and instead ordained Peter, whom Jacob Baradaeus recognised as the legitimate Pope of Alexandria. This resulted in a schism (and even bloodshed) within the Theodosian movement between the supporters of Jacob and Paul.

Following the death of Jacob and the exile of Paul, the new Pope of Alexandria Damian appointed Peter of Callinicum as the Patriarch of Antioch, hoping to reconcile the opposing parties. However, this did not happen. Instead, Damian and Peter soon fell into theological quarrels, with Peter accusing Damian of Sabellianism and Damian in turn accusing Peter of tritheism. This resulted in a schism between the Theodosian sees of Alexandria and Antioch, which lasted past both Damian's and Peter's deaths. The schism ended in 616, when the governor of Egypt, Nicetas, invited Athanasius of Antioch to Egypt to meet with Anastasius of Alexandria.

The non-Theodosian factions within Oriental Orthodoxy gradually disappeared over the next few centuries, with one of the last mentions of them being Pope Jacob of Alexandria's anathema against the Gaianites and Phantasists in 819. Pope Michael I of Alexandria (743–767) referred to himself as "Khail, by the Grace of God Bishop of the city of Alexandria and of the Theodosian people", and as late as the 10th century Severus ibn al-Muqaffa indicates that the Copts still called themselves "Theodosians".

== Sources ==
- Butler, Albert J. (1903). The Arab Conquest of Egypt and the Last Thirty Years under Roman Dominion (PDF). Oxford University Press. ISBN 1724498029.
- Frend, William (1972). The Rise of the Monophysite Movement. BoD – Books on Demand. ISBN 978-0227172414.
- Grillmeier, Aloys; Hainthaler, Theresia (1996). Christ in Christian Tradition: Volume 2 Part 4: The Churches of Jerusalem and Antioch. Translated by O.C. Dean, Jr. Mowbray.
- Hornblower, Simon; Spawforth, Antony (1996). The Oxford Classical Dictionary (III ed.). Oxford University Press. ISBN 978-0198661726.
- Meyendorff, John (1989). Imperial unity and Christian divisions: The Church, AD 450–680. St. Vladimir's Seminary Press. ISBN 978-0881410556.
- Price, Richard (2009). The Acts of the Council of Constantinople of 553 (PDF). Liverpool University Press. ISBN 978-1-84631-178-9.
- Price, Richard; Gaddis, Michael (2007). The Acts of the Council of Chalcedon (PDF). Liverpool University Press. ISBN 978-1-84631-100-0. Archived from the original (PDF) on 2014-02-11.
