= Themistians =

Themistians may refer to:

- Asteroids of the Themis family
- Agnoetae, Christian sect founded by Themistius Calonymus
