= John the Grammarian =

John the Grammarian can refer to:

- John of Caesarea (theologian), the first neo-Chalcedonian theologian
- John Philoponus, an early Byzantine philosopher
- John VII of Constantinople, Patriarch of Constantinople from January 21, 837 to March 4, 843
