= Agnoetae =

Monophysite Christian sect of Late Antiquity

The Agnoetae (Greek ἀγνοηταί agnoetai, from ἀγνοέω agnoeo, to be ignorant of) or Themistians were a Monophysite Christian sect of Late Antiquity that maintained that the nature of Jesus Christ was like other men's in all respects, including limited knowledge despite being divine.

The sect grew out of the dispute between Severus of Antioch and Julian of Halicarnassus concerning the nature of Christ's body. Julian held the view, termed Aphthartodocetism, that Christ's body was incorruptible from birth. The followers of Severus, the Severans, rejected this, holding that only after the Resurrection was Christ's body incorruptible. Around 534, a Severan deacon of Alexandria in Egypt, Themistius Calonymus, published his views on Christ's knowledge under the title Apology for Theophilus. Although he saw himself as defending the Severan view, he ended up founding a new sect.

Themistius' views were based on his exegesis of Mark 13:32 and John 11:34, in which Christ appears ignorant of the Day of Judgement and of the location of Lazarus' body. Agnoetae could also cite Luke 2:52, in which Christ is said to grow in knowledge. According to Liberatus of Carthage, he also attributed to Christ the feeling of fear. His interpretations, however, were not widely accepted among the Monophysites, being notably rejected by Patriarch Timothy IV of Alexandria, who died in 535. Themistius attacked the views of John Philoponus, often considered a tritheist, who attacked his views in turn.

Themistius' successor was Theodosius, not the Patriarch Theodosius I, whose views were opposed by Themistius. John of Damascus calls the movement the Themistiani. There is evidence of an Agnoete monastery in Egypt, the monastery of Salamites near Thunis. It spread out of Egypt into the monastic communities of Palestine. There are surviving fragments of a Syriac treatise Against Themistius.

In 599, Pope Gregory I wrote to Patriarch Eulogius of Alexandria to draw his attention to the Agnoetae and to ask him for his advice on the issue. Gregory I condemned the Agnoetae as heretics, as did Eulogius, who had written a treatise against them. Patriarch Sophronius of Jerusalem (r. 634–638) condemned Agnoetism and it was condemned at the Lateran Council of 649 and the Third Council of Constantinople in 680 or 681, the council declaring Themistius a heretic alongside Severus of Antioch and Apollinaris of Laodicea.

No Agnoetic texts survive, but some of Themistius' works are quoted in Greek in the acts of the councils of 549 and 680/1, in the works of Maximus the Confessor (d. 661) and in the compendium Doctrina patrum de incarnatione verbi. These quotations, however, demonstrate his Monophysitism and not his Agnoetism.

== Modern sense ==
More generally, the name Agnoetae may be applied to all those who deny the omniscience either of God or of Christ. The Catholic Encyclopedia identifies:

- The Theophronians, so named from their leader, Theophronius of Cappadocia (370), denied that God knew the past by memory or the future with certainty; and taught that even for a knowledge of the past he required study and reflection. According to Sozomen's account, Theophronius believed that:

"Though God foreknows that which is not, and knows that which is, and remembers what has happened, he does not always have that knowledge in the same manner with respect to the future and present, and changes his knowledge of the past".

- The Arians, regarding the nature of Christ as inferior to that of his Father, claimed that he was ignorant of many things, as appears from his own statements about the Day of Judgment and by the fact that he frequently asked questions of his companions and of the Jews.
- The Apollinarians, denying that Christ had a human soul, or, at least, that he had an intellect, necessarily regarded him as devoid of human knowledge.
- The Nestorians, generally, and the Adoptionists believed that the knowledge of Christ was limited; that he grew in learning as he grew in age.
- Certain prominent Protestant Reformers, such as Martin Bucer, John Calvin and Huldrych Zwingli, denied the omniscience of Christ incarnate.
- In the 19th and early 20th centuries, some Roman Catholic theologians, such as Louis-Victor-Emile Bougaud, Anton Günther, Heinrich Klee and Alfred Loisy, questioned the omniscience of the human intellect of Christ.
