= Neo-Chalcedonism =

6th-century Byzantine theological movement

Neo-Chalcedonism (also neo-Chalcedonianism) was a sixth-century theological movement in the Byzantine Empire. The term however is quite recent, first appearing in a 1909 work by J. Lebon.

== Overview ==
The main preoccupation of neo-Chalcedonians was specifying the nature of the hypostatic union of two natures in Christ, which was left vague in the definition of Chalcedon. The dyophysite neo-chaldeconians were chiefly opposed by the monophysites, who increasingly labelled them Nestorians, that is, deniers of the deity of Christ.

Major neo-Chalcedonians include Nephalios, John of Caesarea and Leontios of Jerusalem. They sought a middle ground with the so-called "verbal" (moderate) monophysites. They emphasised the synthesis of natures in Christ, employing a word favoured by the verbal monophysites, and the hypostatic as opposed to natural union of the natures. They continued to accept the proposition that only "one of the Trinity has suffered" and the twelve anathemas of Cyril of Alexandria.

The movement achieved supremacy in Egypt during the pontificates of Anastasius I (559–569, 593–599) and Gregory (569–593) of Antioch. Emperor Justinian I accepted the neo-Chalcedonian interpretation, and it was approved officially at the Second Council of Constantinople in 553. This provoked the Schism of the Three Chapters, which lasted over a century.
