= Gaianites =

Egyptian Christian group, 6th–9th centuries

The Gaianites were a Julianist faction within the Egyptian miaphysite church between the sixth and ninth centuries.

== History ==
By the time of the death of Patriarch Timothy IV of Alexandria in 535, Julianism (Aphthartodocetism) had become the dominant theology of Egyptian monasticism, of the rural Christian population and of the lower classes in the city of Alexandria itself. In 535, the Julianists elected as patriarch the archdeacon Gaianus, while their rivals the Severans elected the deacon Theodosius with the support of the Empress Theodora. While the Severans are considered the "imperial" faction, the Gaianites are seen as representing the "Coptic national spirit".

After a little over three months in office, Gaianus was exiled by the Roman authorities. In the rioting that followed, 3 000 Alexandrians died. Theodosius was installed with Roman military help, but went into voluntary exile a little over a year later. The Gaianites were the strongest party in the city when in 564 or 565 they elected a successor to Gaianus, a certain Elpidius. He was arrested on the orders of the Emperor Justinian I in 565 and died at Lesbos en route to Constantinople. He was succeeded by Dorotheus, who headed the Gaianite church until 580.

The reign of Justin II (568–578), however, was a period of declining influence for the Gaianites, who until then had been the dominant faction within the Egyptian miaphysite movement, a position they eventually ceded to the Severans. According to Theophanes of Byzantium, between 570 and 573 the Gaianites recognized the Theodosian patriarch John IV. In 581, they again reunited with the Theodosian party. The anti-miaphysite patriarch Eulogius I of Alexandria, elected in 581, wrote a treatise Contra Theodosianos et Gaianitas ("Against the Theodosians and Gaianites").

The Gaianites are mentioned as a sect into the ninth century. Patriarch Sophronius of Jerusalem (634–638) distinguishes between them and the Julianists in his Narratio miraculorum sancti Cyri et Iohanni ("Narration of the Miracles of Saints Cyrus and John"). Around the same time there were also Gaianites in Ephesus where previously there had been a Julianist bishop in the mid-sixth century. Late in the seventh century, Anastasius of Sinai still regarded the Gaianites as an important sect in his Viae dux ("Guide to the Path"). According to the History of the Patriarchs of Alexandria, around 695 there was a Gaianite patriarch named Theodore who dispatched a Gaianite bishop to India.

According to the History of the Patriarchs, the Severan patriarch Alexander II (704–729) brought the Gaianites back into union and even subjected the 170-year-old Gaianite monastic community of Wadi Habib to his authority. There were still some holdouts, however. Patriarch Jacob, in his inaugural sermon in 819, pronounced the anathema on Gaianites and Phantasiasts.

== Beliefs ==
Like all Julianists, the Gaianites were aphthartodocetes, that is, they denied the corruptibility of the physical body of Jesus Christ. In the early eighth century, Timothy of Constantinople described three factions among the Gaianites: those who held that Jesus' body was incorruptible from the moment of the hypostatic union, those who held that his body was corruptible in itself but was preserved from any corruption by the Logos and those who held that body of Jesus was not only incorruptible but uncreated. These last were called Actistites.

In the treatise De sectis, the Gaianites are the preeminent heretical group. As miaphysites, they believe that there is only one nature in Christ, so that the body can be no more corruptible than the Logos after their union. Although he suffered, it was unlike our suffering in that it was wholly voluntary, the laws of nature having no power over him.

== Patriarchs ==
- Gaianus (535)
- Elpidius (d. 565)
- Dorotheus (565/573–580)
- Theodore (c. 695)
