= Pseudo-Athanasius =

Works falsely attributed to Athanasius of Alexandria

Epistula 51, to Lucifer

Pseudo-Athanasius is the conventional designation for the author of any work falsely attributed to Athanasius of Alexandria, either through misattribution or forgery. Athanasius himself wrote in Greek, but his pseudepigrapha are found also in Arabic, Armenian, Coptic, Ethiopic, Georgian, Latin, Slavonic and Syriac. These non-Greek pseudepigrapha are a mix of translations from Greek and original compositions in another language. Many of these works are conventionally known by Latin titles. Collectively, they are known as Pseudo-Athanasiana. According to Ibrahim Seweros, however:

Literary works falsely attributed to Athanasius of Alexandria form neither a single corpus nor even a cycle. The name of Athanasius is the only common feature among them, and even his name is sometimes missing ...

[E]ach is an independent text in sources, genre, purpose, and date. When examining false attributions, in some cases the name of Athanasius only appears in the title ... and he plays no role in the text itself. This gives the impression that ... at a certain point the name of Athanasius was added to lend it a better reputation. This might have happened during a time of haste, for instance, while copying texts under the difficult circumstances after the Arab conquest.

Consequently, this false attribution happened mostly intentionally and rarely by mistake during the transmission of these texts. All of the texts have several recensions and are preserved in many manuscripts with different dates and places of composition; additionally, all of them have a long history of editorial process.

In addition to whole works, quotations are occasionally attributed to Athanasius by other writers that do no correspond to anything in his known writing, although it is no always possible to determine if these quotations are misattributed or derived from lost works.

== List ==
- Account of Salvation Addressed to the Virgin
- Athanasian Creed
- Adversus quinque haereses, actually by Quodvultdeus
- Apocalypse of Paul, attributed to Athanasius in Arabic
- Apocalypse of Pseudo-Athanasius
- Canons of Pseudo-Athanasius
- Concernining Brothers Who Came to Us
- Contra Apollinarium in two books, possibly originally independent works:
  - De incarnatione contra Apollinarium
  - De salutari epiphania contra Apollinarium
- Contra Sabellianos
- De exemplo ex natura hominis allato, possibly by Eutherios of Tyana
- De incarnatione Dei Verbi et contra Arianos
- De incarnatione Dei Verbi ad Jovinianum
- De observatione monachorum
- De ratione Paschae
- De Trinitate libri duodecim, in twelve books
- Dialogues:
  - Dialexis Montanistae et Orthodoxi, against the Montanists
  - Dialogus Athanasii et Zacchaei, against the Jews
  - Dialogus I de sancta Trinitate, against the Anomoeans
  - Dialogus II de sancta Trinitate, against the Anomoeans
  - Dialogus III de sancta Trinitate, against the Pneumatomachi
  - Dialogus IV de sancta Trinitate, against the Apollinarians
  - Dialogus V de sancta Trinitate, against the Apollinarians
  - Dialogus I contra Macedonianos, against the Pneumatomachi
  - Dialogus II contra Macedonianos, against the Pneumatomachi
  - Disputatio contra Arium, against the Arians
- Enarratio sancti Athanasii de symbolo
- Exhortatio ad sponsam Christi, also called Epistula ad Claudiam de virginitate (Latin)
- Expositio fidei
- Expositiones in Psalmos
- Homilies and sermons:
  - De fallacia diaboli
  - De semente
  - In Lazarum (Greek), actually by Leontius, presbyter of Constantinople
  - On Being Discerning About Salvation (Slavonic)
  - On Lazarus Whom Christ Raised from the Dead (Coptic)
  - On Luke 11:5–9 (Coptic)
  - On Matthew 20:1–16 (Coptic)
  - On Murder and Greed and on Michael, the Archangel (Coptic)
  - On Not Passing Judgment, three Slavonic homilies
  - On Pentecost I (Arabic)
  - On Pentecost II (Arabic)
  - On Pentecost (Coptic)
  - On Soul and Body, attributed to Athanasius in Coptic, but to Alexander I of Alexandria in Syriac
  - On the Suffering of Christ Jesus and on Fear of the Judgment-place (Coptic)
  - On Transgressing the Law (Slavonic)
  - Sermo contra Latinos
  - Sermo contra omnes haereses
  - Sermo de descriptione Deiparae
  - Sermo de patientia
  - Sermo in annuntiationem Deipare
  - Sermo in caecum a nativitate
  - Sermo in nativitatem Christi
  - Sermo in occursum Domini
  - Sermo in ramos palmarum
- In nativitatem praecursoris
- In Michaelem et Gabrielem archangelos, an encomium
- Interpretatio in Symbolum
- Letters:
  - Ad Castorem de octo malitiae cogitationibus
  - Epistle on the Celebration of Easter
  - Epistula 50, a Luciferian forgery
  - Epistula 51, a Luciferian forgery
  - Epistula ad Amun
  - Epistula ad Castorem, actually by John Cassian
  - Epistula ad Episcopum Persarum, traditionally considered authentic
  - Letter to the Antiochenes
- Life and Regimen of the Blessed and Holy Syncletica
- On Endurance
- On Leviticus 21:9, a Coptic apocalypse
- On Virginity (Syriac)
- Oratio contra Arianos IV (the Orationes contra Arianos I–III are authentic)
- Praise of the Angels on the Day of the Carnal Birth of Our Lord, an addition to the liturgical Gloria in excelsis Deo
- Quaestiones ad Antiochum ducem
- Story of Melchizedek
- Synopsis of Holy Scripture
- Teachings and Commandments Concerning Virgins
- Testaments of the Three Patriarchs, attributed to Athanasius only in the Bohairic version
- Vitae monasticae institutio

Some works not attributed to Athanasius per se are made to depend on his authority:

- Contra Arianos dialogus, a dialogue involving Athanasius originally attributed to Vigilius of Thapsus and later to Athanasius himself
- The Prophecy of Daniel to Athanasius, an Arabic apocalypse
- The Great Letter that Fell Down from Heaven to Pope Athanasius, a letter from Heaven
