= Joseph Lebon =

Belgian priest and theologist

Joseph Lebon (Tamines, 1879–1957) was a Belgian priest and professor of theology at the University of Louvain.

He is best known for his immense work devoted to the reception of the Council of Chalcedon in the Syriac and Armenian domains. His 1909 thesis devoted to Monophysite resistance to the Chalcedonian definition or horos centred on the writings of Severus of Antioch and the influence of Cyril of Alexandria. Editions of the surviving Syriac translations of Severus in the Corpus Scriptorum Christianorum Orientalium and ground-breaking articles in Le Muséon followed at regular intervals. The climax of Lebon's work in this area consisted in a contribution to the commemorative volumes for the fifteen hundredth anniversary of the Council (Das Konzil von Chalkedon I-III, eds. Alois Grillmeier, Heinrich Bacht, Wuerzburg 1951–1954). He also edited an early Sources Chrétiennes volume of Athanasius' Letter to Serapion.
