= Leontius of Byzantium =

Byzantine Christian monk and author

Leontius of Byzantium (Greek: Λεόντιος, 485–543) was a Byzantine Christian monk and the author of an influential series of theological writings on sixth-century Christological controversies. Though the details of his life are scarce, he is considered by some a groundbreaking innovator in Christian theological reflection for having introduced Aristotelian definitions into theology.

== Problems of identification ==
The identity of Leontius has been a matter of controversy for scholars. For many years he was considered to be the same person as Leontius of Jerusalem, but now a clear identification may be made between the two. The first scholar to identify and challenge the ambiguity of the writings that come down to us under the name of "Leontius" was Friedrich Loofs in 1887, arguing for a single author of the corpus leontianum. That hypothesis influenced scholarship until the publication of Marcel Richard's 1944 article Léonce de Jérusalem et Léonce de Byzance, which aimed to distinguish two figures among the works which had formerly been attributed to a single person. Since the publication of that article, Richard's conclusions have been accepted by all scholars writing about Leontius.

The attribution of various works to one or the other Leontius is widely accepted. Richard identified Leontius of Jerusalem as the author of Contra Monophysitas and Contra Nestorianos, while assigning to Leontius of Byzantium the three books Contra Nestorianos et Eutychianos, the treatise against Severus of Antioch known as Epilysis, and the Triginta capita contra Severum. Leontius of Byzantium is also considered the author of the Dialogue against the Aphthartodocetists, and possibly other works as well.

== Biography ==
Current scholarship identifies Leontius of Byzantium as the Leontius mentioned in documents from the reign of Justinian (527–565) and in the biographies of the sixth-century ascetics written by Cyril of Scythopolis, though the latter identification has been challenged.

Based on the works that are currently attributed to him, certain determinations about his biography can be made. He was, perhaps, born at Constantinople, which accounts for his being identified as from Byzantium. He has been given the epithets Hierosolymitanus ("of Jerusalem", due to a possible connection with the Lavra of St. Saba) and Scholasticus (because he is considered to be the first "schoolman," as the introducer of the Aristotelian definitions into theology, though according to others, this name refers to his having been an advocate, a special meaning of the word scholasticus). He himself states that in his early years he belonged to a Nestorian community. For a time, it seems he was also a member of the so-called community of "Scythian monks."

According to Cyril's Vita Sabae, Leontius was a monk of the Lavra of St. Saba near Jerusalem, a disciple of Nonnus of Edessa and one of the leaders of the Origenist party on Palestine. In 531 he accompanied Saba to Constantinople, where he was condemned for his Origenist views. Brian Daley, however, considers this association very tenuous, both for historical reasons and because the text of the corpus leontianum does not seem to contain Origenist views.

== Theology ==
Attributable to Leontius we have five polemical writings in defense of the dogma of Chalcedon, a collection of writings referred to as the corpus leontianum. From this body of writings it may be inferred that Leontius was a monk, ascetic, and hermit. From the introduction of his third treatise Against the Nestorians we learn that as a young man, he was a member of the circle of Diodorus of Tarsus and Theodore of Mopsuestia.

Leontius is best known for the theory of the enhypostasia (ἐνυποστασία) of the human nature of Christ in the divine hypostasis of the Logos. According to Carlo Dell'Osso, the first scholar to translate his writings into a modern language, his theology is dominated by the theme of dyophysitism (a reaction to the heretical doctrine of monophysitism), which is an affirmation of the permanence and distinction of the two natures of Christ — divine and human — after the Incarnation, a condition which Leontius identified as hypostatic union.

== Works ==
The works that comprise the corpus leontianum are the following; they are contained in the Patrologia Graeca, volume 86. The first complete critical edition of these works was prepared by Brian Daley and published in 2017.

- Contra Nestorianos et Eutychianos, against the two extreme positions of Eutychianism and Nestorianism
- Dialogue against the Aphthartodocetists, against those who Aphthartodocetism of Christ's human nature
- Contra Nestorianos, another work against the followers of Theodore of Mopsuestia
- Epilysis, also called Solutio argumentorum a Severo obiectorum, a work against the arguments of Severus of Antioch
- Epaporemata, also called Triginta capita contra Severum, another work against Severus
