= Acephali =

Various leaderless Christian sects

In church history, the term acephali (from Koine Greek: ἀκέφαλοι aképhaloi, 'headless', singular ἀκέφαλος aképhalos from ἀ- a-, 'without', and κεφαλή kephalé, 'head') has been applied to several sects that supposedly had no leader. E. Cobham Brewer wrote, in Dictionary of Phrase and Fable, that acephalites, "properly means men without a head." Jean Cooper wrote, in Dictionary of Christianity, that it characterizes "various schismatical Christian bodies". Among them were Nestorians who rejected the Council of Ephesus’ condemnation of Patriarch Nestorius of Constantinople, which deposed Nestorius and declared him a heretic.

== Fifth-century acephali ==
Those who refused to acknowledge the authority of the Council of Chalcedon were originally called Haesitantes; the Acephali developed from among them, and, according to Blunt, the earlier name – Haesitantes – seems to have been used for only a short time.

With the apparent purpose of bringing the Orthodox and heretics into unity, Patriarch Peter III of Alexandria and Patriarch Acacius of Constantinople had elaborated a new creed in which they expressly condemned both Nestorius and Eutyches, a presbyter and archimandrite, but at the same time rejected the decisions of the Council of Chalcedon. This ambiguous formula, though approved by Byzantine Emperor Zeno and imposed in his Henoticon, could only satisfy the indifferent.

The term applied to a 5th-century faction among the Eutychians, who seceded from Peter, a Miaphysite, in 482, after Peter signed the Henoticon and was recognised by Zeno as the legitimate patriarch of Alexandria, by which they were "deprived of their head". They remained "without king or bishop" until they were reconciled with Coptic Orthodox Pope Mark II of Alexandria (799–819). The condemnation of Eutyches irritated the rigid Monophysites; the equivocal attitude taken towards the Council of Chalcedon appeared to them insufficient, and many of them, especially the monks, deserted Peter, preferring to be without a head, rather than remain in communion with him. Later, they joined the adherents of the non-Chalcedonian Patriarch Severus of Antioch. They were, according to Oxford English Dictionary Online, a "group of extreme Monophysites" and "were absorbed by the Jacobites".

Liberatus of Carthage wrote, in Breviarium causae Nestorianorum et Eutychianorum, that those at the Council of Ephesus who followed neither Patriarch Cyril I of Alexandria nor Patriarch John I of Antioch were called Acephali.

Esaianites were one of the sects into which the Alexandrian Acephali separated at the end of the 5th century. They were the followers of Esaias, a deacon of Palestine, who claimed to have been consecrated to the episcopal office by the Bishop Eusebius. His opponents averred that after the bishop's death, his hands had been laid upon the head of Esaias by some of his friends.

Paulitae were a sect of Acephali who followed Chalcedonian Patriarch Paul of Alexandria, who was deposed by a synod at Gaza, in 541, for his uncanonical consecration by the Patriarch of Constantinople, and who, after his deposition, sided with the Miaphysites. (Note: They are mentioned as Paulianists in a treatise on the reception of heretics written by Patriarch Timothy I of Constantinople.)

Barsanians, later called Semidalites, were a sect of Acephali at the end of the 5th century. They had no succession of priests, and professed to keep up the celebration of a valid Eucharist by placing a few crumbs of some of the bread which had been consecrated by Dioscorus into a vessel of meal, and then using as fully consecrated the bread baked from it.

The Barsanuphians separated from the Acephali in the late 6th century and developed their own episcopal hierarchy.

== Other acephali ==
According to Brewer, acephalites were also certain bishops exempt from the jurisdiction and discipline of their patriarch. Cooper explains that they are "priests rejecting episcopal authority or bishops that of their metropolitans." Blunt described clerici acephali as those clergy who were ordained with a sinecure benefice and who generally obtained their orders by paying for them, that is, by simony. The Council of Pavia, in 853, legislated its canons 18 and 23 against them, from which it appears, according to Blunt, that they were mostly chaplains to noblemen, that they produced much scandal in the Church, and that they disseminated many errors.

In the Middle Ages the term denoted clerici vagantes, clergy without title or benefice.

According to Brewer, acephalites were also a sect of Levellers during the reign of Henry I of England who acknowledged no leader. They were, according to Oxford English Dictionary Online, "a group of free socagers having no feudal superior except the king." This usage is now considered obsolete.
