= Sergius of Cyrrhus =

5th-century Syrian bishop

Sergius I of Cyrrhus was a bishop of Cyrrhus, a Roman city in what is today Syria. He lived at a time when Cyrrhus was the center of a number of theological controversies, that birthed the Nestorian and Jacobite churches.

He was a late 5th century Nestorian bishop and was deposed by Byzantine Emperor Justin I in the theological controversies following the first four ecumenical councils. Sergius I of Cyrrhus was replaced by another bishop called Sergius II, who was of the directly opposite theological opinion, being a Jacobite. This bishop was subsequently expelled in 522 and replaced by an Orthodox bishop.
