= Monophysitism =

Christological doctrine

'Spectrum' of Christology, with monophysitism at far right

Monophysitism (/məˈnɒfɪsaɪtɪzəm/ mə-NOF-ih-seye-tih-zəm) or monophysism (/məˈnɒfɪzɪzəm/ mə-NOF-ih-zih-zəm; from Greek μόνος monos, "solitary" and φύσις physis, "nature") is a Christological doctrine that states that there was only one nature—the divine—in the person of Jesus Christ, who was the incarnated Word. It is rejected as heretical by the Catholic Church, Eastern Orthodox Church, Anglicanism, Lutheranism, Reformed Christianity (Calvinist), and all mainstream Protestant denominations, which hold to the dyophysitism of the 451 Council of Chalcedon—as well by Oriental Orthodoxy, which holds to miaphysitism.

== Background ==
The First Council of Nicaea (325) declared that Christ was both divine (homoousios, consubstantial, of one being or essence, with the Father) and human (was incarnate and became man). In the fifth century a heated controversy arose between the sees and theological schools of Antioch and Alexandria about how divinity and humanity existed in Christ, with the former stressing the humanity, the latter the divinity of Christ. Cyril of Alexandria succeeded in having Nestorius, a prominent exponent of the Antiochian school, condemned at the Council of Ephesus in 431, and insisted on the formula "one physis of the incarnate Word", claiming that any formula that spoke of two physeis represented Nestorianism. Some taught that in Christ the human nature was completely absorbed by the divine, leaving only a divine nature. In 451, the Council of Chalcedon, on the basis of Pope Leo the Great's 449 declaration, defined that in Christ there were two natures united in one person.

Those who insisted on the "one physis" formula were referred to as monophysites (/məˈnɒfɪsaɪts/), while those who accepted the "two natures" definition were called dyophysites, a term also applied to followers of Nestorianism.

== Groups called monophysite ==
The forms of monophysism were numerous, and included the following:

- Acephali were monophysites who in 482 broke away from Peter III of Alexandria who made an agreement with Acacius of Constantinople, sanctioned by Emperor Zeno with his Henotikon edict that condemned both Nestorius and Eutyches, as the Council of Chalcedon had done, but ignored that council's decree on the two natures of Christ. They saw this as a betrayal of S. Cyril's use of "mia physis" and refused to be subject to the Chalcedonian Patriarch of Alexandria, preferring to be instead ecclesiastically 'headless' (Latin: acephalī). For this, they were known as 'the headless' or 'headless ones'.
- Agnoetae, Themistians or Agnosticists, founded by Themistius Calonymus around 534, held that the nature of Jesus Christ, although divine, was like other men's in all respects, including limited knowledge. They must be distinguished from a fourth-century group called by the same name, who denied that God knew the past and the future.
- Aphthartodocetae, Phantasiasts or, after their leader Julian of Halicarnassus, Julianists believed "that the body of Christ, from the very moment of his conception, was incorruptible, immortal and impassible, as it was after the resurrection, and held that the suffering and death on the cross was a miracle contrary to the normal conditions of Christ's humanity". Emperor Justinian I wished to have this teaching adopted as orthodox, but died before he could put his plans into effect.
- Apollinarians or Apollinarists, named after Apollinaris of Laodicea (who died in 390) proposed that Jesus had a normal human body but had a divine mind instead of a regular human soul. This teaching was condemned by the First Council of Constantinople (381) and died out within a few decades. Cyril of Alexandria declared it a mad proposal.
- Docetists, not all of whom were monophysites, held that Jesus had no human nature: his humanity was only a phantasm, which, united with the impassible, immaterial divine nature, could not really suffer and die.
- Eutychians taught that Jesus had only one nature, a union of the divine and human that is not an even compound, since what is divine is infinitely larger than what is human: the humanity is absorbed by and transmuted into the divinity, as a drop of honey, mixing with the water of the sea, vanishes. The body of Christ, thus transmuted, is not consubstantial homoousios with humankind. In contrast to Severians, who are called verbal monophysites, Eutychianists are called real or ontological monophysites, and their teaching is "an extreme form of the monophysite heresy that emphasizes the exclusive prevalence of the divinity in Christ".
- Tritheists, a group of sixth-century monophysites said to have been founded by a monophysite named John Ascunages of Antioch. Their principal writer was John Philoponus, who taught that the common nature of Father, Son and Holy Spirit is an abstraction of their distinct individual natures.
- The Oriental Orthodox, or Severians, accept the reality of Christ's human nature to the extent of insisting that his body was capable of corruption, but argue that, since a single person has a single nature and Christ is one person, not two, he has only a single nature. Agreeing in substance, though not in words, with the Definition of Chalcedon, they are called "verbal monophysites" by some Eastern Orthodox. The Oriental Orthodox reject the label of monophysitism and consider monophysitism a heresy, preferring to label their non-Chalcedonian beliefs as miaphysitism.

== Verbal monophysitism ==
Concerning verbal declarations of monophysitism, Justo L. González stated, "in order not to give an erroneous idea of the theology of the so-called monophysite churches, that have subsisted until the twentieth century, one should point out that all the extreme sects of monophysism disappeared within a brief span, and that the Christology of the present so-called monophysite churches is closer to a verbal than to a real monophysism".

== Political situation of monophysitism after Chalcedon ==
Under Emperor Basiliscus, who ousted Emperor Zeno in 475, "the monophysites reached the pinnacle of their power". In his Encyclion, which he issued in the same year, he revoked the Council of Chalcedon and recognized the Second Council of Ephesus of 449 except for its approval of Eutyches, whom Basiliscus condemned. He required his edict to be signed by each bishop. Among the signatures he obtained were those of three of the four Eastern Patriarchs, but the Patriarch and the populace of the capital protested so resolutely that in 476, seeing that his overthrow was imminent, he issued his Anti-Encyclion revoking his former edict. In the same year, Zeno returned victoriously.

Events had made it clear that there was a split between the population, staunchly Chalcedonian in sympathies, of Constantinople and the Balkans and the largely anti-Chalcedonian population of Egypt and Syria. In an attempt to reconcile both sides, Zeno, with the support of Acacius of Constantinople and Peter III of Alexandria, tried to enforce the compromise Henoticon (Formula of Union) decree of 482, which condemned Eutyches but ignored Chalcedon. Schisms followed on both sides. Rome excommunicated Acacius (leading to the 35-year Acacian schism), while in Egypt the Acephali broke away from Peter III. The Acacian schism continued under Zeno's successor, the monophysite Anastasius I Dicorus and ended only with the accession of the Chalcedonian Justin I in 518.

Justin I was succeeded by the Chalcedonian Justinian I (527–565), whose wife Empress Theodora protected and assisted the monophysites. Ghassanid patronage of the monophysite Syrian Church under phylarch Al-Harith ibn Jabalah was crucial for its survival, revival, and even its spread. Justinian I was followed by Justin II, who after being a monophysite, perhaps because of Theodora's influence, converted to the Chalcedonian faith before obtaining the imperial throne. Some time later, he adopted a policy of persecuting the monophysites. From Justinian I on, no emperor was a declared monophysite, although they continued their efforts to find compromise formulas such as monoenergism and monothelitism.

== See also ==
- Miaphysitism
- Chalcedonian Christianity
- Non-Chalcedonian Christianity
- Barsanuphians, an Egyptian non-Chalcedonian sect of Monophysitism
