= Leontius of Jerusalem =

Byzantine Christian theologian

Leontius of Jerusalem (Greek: Λεόντιος, ca.485 - ca.543, though debated) was a Byzantine Christian theologian, monk and proponent of the Council of Chalcedon.

Virtually all of Egypt and much of Palestine and Syria had rejected Chalcedon (451). By the 530s this reached a breaking point with the risk of schism - as eventually happened, with Oriental Orthodoxy being descended of those who rejected the council. Leontius involved himself in trying to convince anti-Chalcedonians of the validity of Chalcedonian Christology.

He is known only from two of his works:

- Contra Monophysitas (Against the Monophysites)
- Contra Nestorianos (Against the Nestorians)

== Integrity of Citations ==
Several scholars have questioned Leontius' use of sources. In P. T. R. Gray's (Professor of Religious Studies York University) Leontius of Jerusalem: Against the Monophysites: Testimonies of the Saints, he states, "he is not at all scholarly–he is downright sloppy, in fact–when it comes to the texts he himself wishes to cite. Something more, then, is at work here than scholarly capabilities." Similarly, in a work entitled Forgery, Gray (based on unpublished research of M. Richard), writes: "Of the one hundred and fourteen texts in his dyophysite florilegium, twenty-six are forgeries in the strict sense or else misattributions, and a further ten are suspect. All five texts attributed to Justin Martyr, and eight of the eleven attributed to John Chrysostom are forgeries!".

== Confusion with Leontius of Byzantium ==
Historically, there has been a problem of misidentification between Leontius of Byzantium and Leontius of Jerusalem. The first scholar to identify and challenge the ambiguity of the writings that come down to us under the name of "Leontius" was Friedrich Loofs in 1887, arguing for a single author of the corpus leontianum. That hypothesis influenced scholarship until the publication of Marcel Richard's 1944 article Léonce de Jérusalem et Léonce de Byzance, which aimed to distinguish two figures among the works which had formerly been attributed to a single person. Since the publication of that article, Richard's conclusions have been accepted by all scholars writing about Leontius. It is therefore Richard who is responsible for establishing the identity of Leontius as an author in his own right.

The attribution of various works to one or the other Leontius has been widely accepted. Richard identified Leontius of Jerusalem as the author of Contra Monophysitas and Contra Nestorianos. To Leontius of Byzantium, on the other hand, he assigned the three books Contra Nestorianos et Eutychianos, the treatise against Severus of Antioch known as Epilysis, the Triginta capita contra Severum, and some other more minor works.

The dating of Leontius of Jerusalem's works have recently been questioned by scholars. Richard considered the two Leontii to be contemporaries living during the time of Justinian, and for decades the common opinion of scholars shared this conclusion. Certain more recent scholars, particularly Dirk Krausmüller and Carlo Dell'Osso, have broken this consensus and sided towards assigning Leontius of Jerusalem a later date than Leontius of Byzantium.

Krausmüller has suggested that the original arguments of Loofs were correct in dating the Contra Monophysitas either between the years 568 and 680, or between 580 and 640. Based on more current scholarship and his own conclusions, Krausmüller has concluded that Leontius of Jerusalem does not belong to the reign of Justinian, as formerly supposed, but to a later date, as he must have written the Contra Nestorianos in 614 at the earliest. Dell'Osso, judging these arguments favorably, echoes Krausmüller's conclusions that Leontius of Jerusalem was a theologian of the seventh century, and based on certain similarities between the writings of this later Leontius and those of Maximus the Confessor (c. 580–662), assigns them to the same time period.

== Influence on Justinian I ==
Leontius' influence on Justinian I has been a much discussed topic among scholars. In his work entitled: Leontius of Jerusalem's "Against the Monophysites" As A Possible Source For Justinian's "Letter to the Alexandrian Monks", J. MacDonald states that "One aspect of Leontius of Jerusalem's importance is his possible influence upon the Christology of the Emperor Justinian." This idea stems from the similarities between the writings of the two, especially between Leontius' Against the Monophysites Justinian's Letter to the Alexandrian Monks. This implies that Justinian based his writings on Leontius'. He goes on to assert that "Through his edicts, theological writings and sponsorship of the Fifth Ecumenical council in Constantinople in 533, Justinian played a crucial role in the victory of neo-Chalcedonian theology".
