= Aphthartodocetae =

6th-century non-Chalcedonian Christian sect

The Aphthartodocetae (Greek Ἀφθαρτοδοκῆται, from ἄφθαρτος, aphthartos, "incorruptible" and δοκεῖν, dokein, "to seem"), also called Julianists or Phantasiasts by their opponents, were members of a 6th-century Non-Chalcedonian sect. Their leader, Julian of Halicarnassus, taught that Christ's body was always incorruptible and only appeared to corrupt and exhibit blameless passions. This was in disagreement with another Non-Chalcedonian leader, Severus of Antioch, who insisted that Christ's body was passible, truly manifested blameless passions, was corruptible, and only became incorruptible following the resurrection.

In the words of Severus, in his letter approving of the synodical letter of Theodosios I of Alexandria, the Julianists taught "the flesh of our Saviour, from its very establishment through the womb and the union, was impassible and immortal, and who assign to it the incorruptibility which is recognized in impassibility and immortality (and not simply in holiness and sinlessness)." Due to Christ being impassible, the doctrine of Julian made "the sufferings...false" and illusory: "For an impassible and immortal body does not admit of sufferings and death, but is considered to have suffered and died only in surmise, and as it were in an illusion of sleep." Severus asserts that such a doctrine where Christ only appears to have suffered places mankind "unavoidably...under the servitude of death...redeemed by nocturnal hallucinations and not in reality by the blood of his cross."

This is in contrast to what Severus approves in Theodosios' letter, which taught: "Your Holiness had affirmed well and fittingly that the body of our Lord and Saviour was consubstantial with us and suffered natural and voluntary sufferings like us, but without sin. And by this means you have put away those who have dared to assert that he suffered in an impassible and immortal body." Christ's sufferings are voluntary because "in that flesh united to the Word...there was nothing of the ancient sin which made our race wither: for when he became incarnate in a flesh which was of this sort, it was proper that he should draw near to death [i.e. voluntarily]."

Elsewhere, Severus summed up Julian's theology as follows:

This foolish man, who confesses the passions with his lips only, hiding his impiety, wrote thus: 'Incorruptibility was always attached to the body of our Lord, which was passible of His own will for the sake of others.' And in brotherly love I wrote and asked him : 'What do you mean by "incorruptible," and "suffered of His own will for the sake of others," and "was attached to the body of our Lord," if without any falsehood you confess it to be by nature passible? For, if by the incorruptibility possessed by it you mean holiness without sin, we all confess this with you, that the holy body from the womb which He united to Himself originally by the Holy Spirit of the pure Virgin, the Theotokos, was conceived and born in the flesh without sin and conversed with us men, because "He did no sin, neither was guile found in His mouth," according to the testimony of the Scriptures. But, if you call impassibility and immortality incorruptibility, and say that the body which suffered in the flesh on our behalf was not one that was capable of suffering with voluntary passions and dying in the flesh, you reduce the saving passions on our behalf to a phantasy; for a thing which does not suffer also does not die, and it is a thing incapable of suffering.' And upon receiving such remarks as these from me he openly refused to call the holy body of Emmanuel passible in respect of voluntary passions; and therefore he did not hesitate to write thus, without shame and openly: 'We do not call Him of our nature in respect of passions, but in respect of essence. Therefore, even if He is impassible, and even if He is incorruptible, yet He is of our nature in respect of nature.'

In synopsis, Christ's body was passible and thereby had the capacity to actually corrupt according to Severus and Theodosios. In contrast, Julian allegedly taught Christ's body to be impassible, which would (according to Severus) make corruption impossible and thereby necessitate any corruption and suffering to be illusory. While Julian asserts Christ's corruptibility to be voluntary as a response to "impassibility" making it otherwise impossible, Severus and Theodosios assert that Christ's corruptibility is voluntary as a response to "sinlessness," which otherwise would not permit corruption as it is a punishment for sin.

In 564, Emperor Justinian I, who was in his 80's and had already reigned for almost 40 years, adopted the tenets of the Aphthartodocetae and issued an "edict compelling assent to the notion that the body of Christ was 'incorruptible and not susceptible to the natural and blameless passions,'” (i.e. suffering) and attempted to elevate their beliefs to the rank of Orthodox dogma. Patriarch Eutychius of Constantinople, who had presided over the Fifth General Council, resisted Justinian's efforts by arguing the incompatibility of the Aphthartodocetic beliefs with scripture. Justinian ensured that John Scholasticus replaced Eutychius who was exiled from his see by Justinian. The Patriarch of Antioch, Anastasius, was also threatened with replacement and exile. Justinian prepared further plans to enforce the tenets among the communions throughout the empire, but its issue was prevented when Justinian died. Scholasticus was eventually able to negotiate a compromise but this did not last.

== See also ==
- Catechetical School of Alexandria
- Celestial flesh
- Docetism
- Eutychianism
- Gaianites
- Monoenergism
- Monophysitism
- Non-Chalcedonianism
- Second Council of Constantinople
- State church of the Roman Empire

== Sources ==
- Allen, Pauline; Hayward, C.T.R. (2005). Severus of Antioch. Routledge. ISBN 9780415234016.
- Ostrogorsky, George (1956). History of the Byzantine State. Oxford: Basil Blackwell.
- Meyendorff, John (1989). Imperial unity and Christian divisions: The Church 450-680 A.D. The Church in history. Vol. 2. Crestwood, NY: St. Vladimir's Seminary Press. ISBN 9780881410563.
