= Julian of Halicarnassus =

6th cent. Christian theologian, aphthartodocetist

Julian, bishop of Halicarnassus (Greek: Ίουλιανός Άλικαρνασσού, d. after 527), also known as Julian the Phantastiast, was an anti-Chalcedonian theologian who contested with Severus of Antioch over the phthartos of Christ. His followers were known as the Aphthartodocetae. He lived in exile for a time in the monastery of the Enaton in Egypt.

Julian believed "that the body of Christ, from the very moment of his conception, was incorruptible, immortal and impassible, as it was after the resurrection, and held that the suffering and death on the cross was a miracle contrary to the normal conditions of Christ's humanity", known as aphthartodocetism.

== Episcopate ==
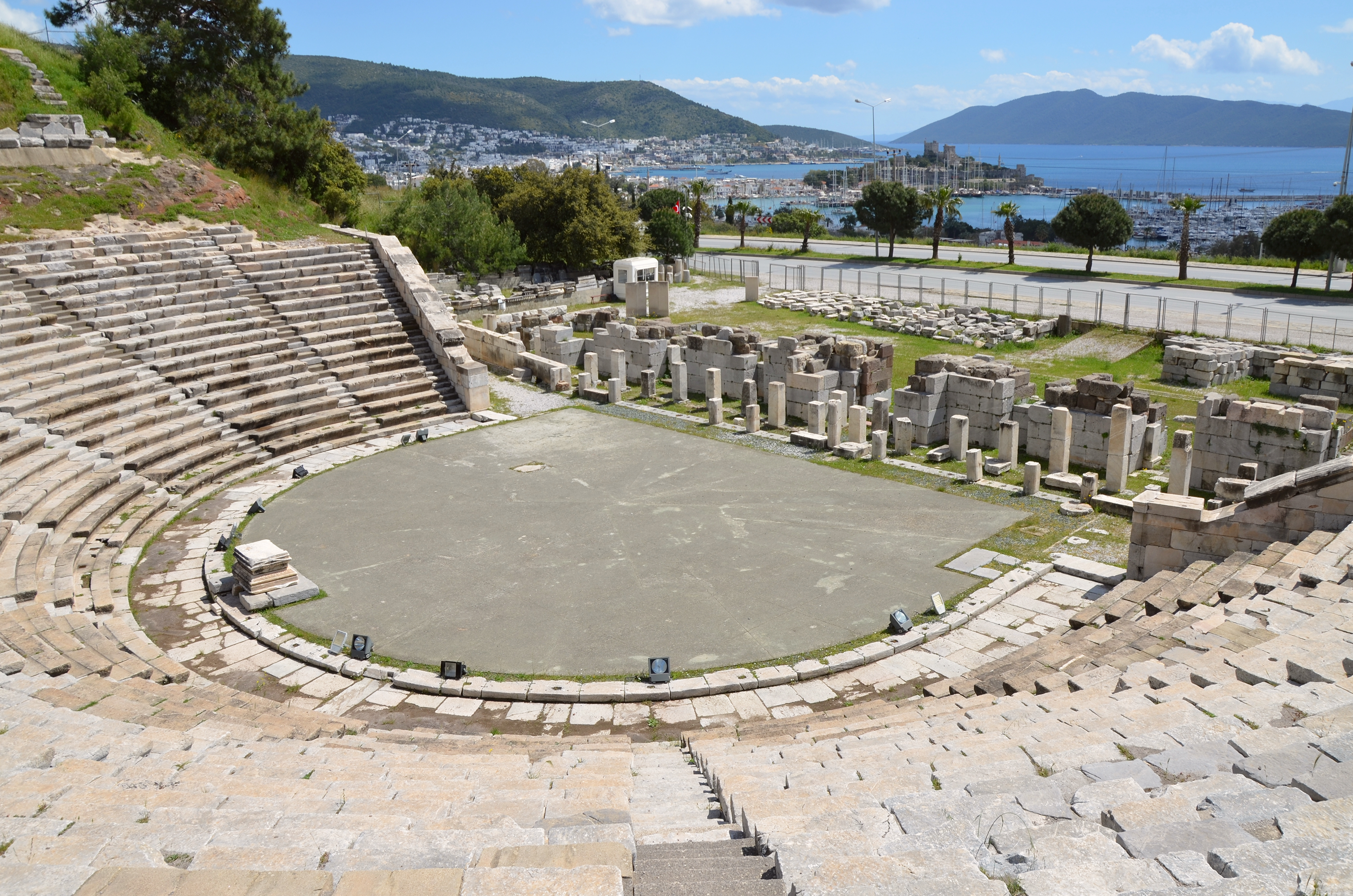
Theatre of Halicarnassus in modern Bodrum, with the crusader Bodrum Castle seen in the background.

In 511, Julian, bishop of Halicarnassus, initially allied with Severus, the future Patriarch of Antioch, in deposing Macedonius, the Chalcedonian Patriarch of Constantinople. However, when Emperor Justinian began persecuting the Miaphysite faithful throughout the Byzantine Empire, both Julian and Severus sought refuge in Egypt. It was there that a disagreement arose between them, as Julian asserted that his doctrine of aphthartodocetism — the belief that Christ’s body was naturally incorruptible—was not only orthodox but derived from the writings of Severus himself. The dispute intensified and soon developed into an intra-Miaphysite schism that persisted for centuries.

By the late 520s contact between Julian and Severus had ceased, yet their conflict had already divided the wider Miaphysite community, especially in Egypt. Patriarch Timothy IV of Alexandria showed sympathy toward Julian’s position, and following his death, the pro-Julianist Gaianus was elected patriarch. Although Emperor Justinian replaced him with Theodosius, a supporter of Severus, Gaianus continued to enjoy popular backing for several months. The controversy eventually spread to the Levant and Asia Minor, prompting Justinian himself to issue an edict around 564-565 addressing the question of the incorruptibility of Christ’s body.

Julianism survived well into the eighth century. The Armenian Church in particular displayed Julianist tendencies, before later adopting Severian Miaphysitism formally at the Third Council of Dvin.

== Theology ==
The central issue in the dispute between Severus and Julian concerned the nature of the physical body of Jesus Christ. While both agreed that Christ’s body was incorruptible after the Resurrection, Julian insisted that it had also been incorruptible (aphthartos) before the Passion. He held that, unlike the fallen human nature, the body of Christ did not, by its nature, experience change that included fatigue, sleep, or death, but rather that Christ voluntarily submitted to suffering and mortality through his will to do so. For Julian, this affirmed a stronger one-nature Christology and safeguarded the absolute sinlessness of Christ.

Severus, in contrast, repudiated this doctrine as compromising the reality of the Incarnation. He imitated Cyril of Alexandria in his critique of Nestorius, asserting that Christ had taken on a corruptible human body to fully partake in humanity, and to make a true redemptive sacrifice; otherwise, there would be an incomplete incarnation and thus, an incomplete salvation. It is for this reason that he characterized Julian as a follower of Eutyches, Mani, and the early docetists, all of whom he accused of diminishing Christ's real humanity.

== Works ==
Julian’s three surviving letters to Severus, along with most of Severus’s polemical responses, were preserved in Syriac translation by Pawlos of Kallinikos in 528. A further 154 fragments attributed to Julian survive, also mostly in Syriac. Although these texts provide only limited information about his life, they nonetheless allow for a partial reconstruction of his theological position and the development of the Julianist controversy.

== See also ==
- Dyophysitism
- Adoptionism
- Manichaeism
- Mark Ibn Kunbar

== Sources ==
- Hovorun, Cyril (2008). Will, Action and Freedom: Christological Controversies in the Seventh Century. Leiden-Boston: BRILL. ISBN 978-9004166660.
