= Apollinarism =

Christian heretical belief

Apollinarism or Apollinarianism is a Christological position proposed by Apollinaris of Laodicea that argues that Jesus had a human body and sensitive soul, but not a human rational mind, the Divine Logos taking the place of the latter. It was deemed heretical by the First Council of Constantinople in 381 and virtually died out within the following decades.

== History ==
The Trinity had been recognized at the First Council of Nicaea in 325, but debate about exactly what it meant continued. A rival to the common Dyophysite belief of Jesus having two natures what would later become the Chalcedonian Churches, was the belief known as Miaphysitism, the doctrine that Christ had only one nature fully human and fully divine, another smaller rival was that of Monophysitism. Apollinarism and Eutychianism were two forms of Monophysitism, the doctrine that Christ had one nature and it was only divine, which is not to be confused with miaphysitism, as miaphysites condemn monophysitism and vice versa. Apollinaris's rejection of Christ having a human mind was considered an over-reaction to Arianism and its teaching that Christ was a lesser god.

Theodoret charged Apollinaris with confounding the persons of the Godhead and giving in to the heretical ways of Sabellius. Basil of Caesarea accused him of abandoning the literal sense of the scripture, and taking it up wholly with the allegorical sense. His views were condemned in a Synod at Alexandria, under Athanasius of Alexandria, in 362, and later subdivided into several different heresies, the main ones of which were the Polemians and the Antidicomarianites.

Apollinaris, considering the rational soul and spirit as essentially liable to sin and capable, at its best, of only precarious efforts, saw no way of saving Christ's impeccability and the infinite value of Redemption, except by the elimination of the human spirit from Jesus' humanity, and the substitution of the Divine Logos in its stead. Apollinarism was declared to be a heresy in 381 by the First Council of Constantinople.

== Neo-Apollinarianism ==
Christian philosopher William Lane Craig has proposed a neo-Apollinarian Christology in which the divine Logos completes the human nature of Christ. Craig says his proposal is tentative and he welcomes critique and interaction from other scholars.

Craig also clarifies "what I called a Neo-Apollinarian Christological model" by stating that

What I argue in my Neo-Apollinarian proposal is that the Logos brought to the human body just those properties which would make it a complete human nature – things like rationality, self-consciousness, freedom of the will, and so forth. Christ already possessed those in his divine nature, and it is in virtue of those that we are created in the image of God. So when he brought those properties to the animal body – the human body – it completes it and makes it a human nature. Against Apollinarius, I want to say that Christ did have a complete human nature. He was truly God and truly man. Therefore his death on our behalf as our representative before God was efficacious.

== Christians accused of Apollinarianism ==
- William Lane Craig – Proposed a "Neo-Apollinarian" Christological model, in which the divine Logos completes or supplies the rational faculties of Christ, while explicitly affirming that Christ possesses a full human nature.
- Avery Austin aka GodLogic – During a March 2026 debate at the Bless God Summit on the Trinity with Latter-day Saint apologist Jacob Hansen, Austin rejected the view that Christ possesses both a divine and a human mind, and instead stated that Christ has only one, divine mind. This formulation was interpreted by critics as Apollinarian. In a subsequent livestream, he stated that he had made a mistake and offered clarification of his position.

== See also ==
- Dyophysitism – Christological position
- Miaphysitism – Christological doctrine
- Nestorianism – Umbrella term used for several related but distinct sets of Christian teachings
- Christology – Theological Study of Jesus Christ

== Sources ==
- Artemi, E., «Mia physis of God Logos sesarkomeni» a)The analysis of this phrase according to Cyril of Alexandria b)The analysis of this phrase according to Apollinaris of Laodicea», Ecclesiastic Faros t. ΟΔ (2003), 293 – 304.
- Chan, Joyce (2021). Apollinarianism, Carey Theological College, University of British Columbia.
- McGrath, Alister. 1998. Historical Theology, An Introduction to the History of Christian Thought. Oxford: Blackwell Publishers. Chapter 1.
- Edwards, Mark (2009). Catholicity and Heresy in the Early Church. Ashgate. ISBN 9780754662914.
