= Non-Chalcedonian Christianity =

Branches of Christianity

Non-Chalcedonian Christianity comprises the branches of Christianity that do not accept and uphold theological resolutions of the Council of Chalcedon, the council following Ephesus, held in 451. Non-Chalcedonian denominations reject the Christological Definition of Chalcedon (which asserted a carefully balanced compromise between Miaphysitism and Dyophysitism), for varying reasons. Non-Chalcedonian Christianity thus stands in contrast to Chalcedonian Christianity.

Today, the Oriental Orthodox Churches predominantly comprise most of non-Chalcedonian Christianity.

== Overview ==
The most substantial non-Chalcedonian tradition is known as Oriental Orthodoxy. Within this tradition are a number of ancient Christian churches including the Coptic Orthodox Church of Alexandria, the Syriac Orthodox Church of Antioch (sometimes referred to as "Jacobite"), the Armenian Apostolic Church, the Ethiopian Orthodox Tewahedo Church, the Eritrean Orthodox Tewahedo Church and the Malankara Orthodox Syrian Church.

The official Christology of the Oriental Orthodox Churches is Miaphysitism, which affirms one composite nature of God the Word Incarnate, fully divine and fully human, as articulated by the Council of Ephesus and Cyril of Alexandria. The Church also affirms Trinitarian Triadology.

The Christology of the Church of the East (i.e., "Nestorian" Christianity) may be called "non-Ephesine" for not accepting the Council of Ephesus, but did finally gather to ratify the Council of Chalcedon at the Synod of Mar Aba I in 544.

Within the Patriarchates of Alexandria and Antioch, the rejection of the Chalcedonian definition led to a significant schism. The common people of Egypt and Syria largely opposed the council, while the Byzantine-Greek minority, which constituted the ruling class, generally accepted it. These two groups competed for control of the ancient sees of Alexandria and Antioch, which were important centers of influence in Christendom at the time. Ultimately, neither faction achieved complete dominance over either church, resulting in the existence of two distinct, parallel patriarchates of Alexandria and Antioch for nearly 1,500 years, a situation that continues to the present day.

The Coptic Orthodox Church of Alexandria represented the native Egyptian patriarchal faction that rejects Chalcedon, while the Greek Orthodox Church of Alexandria comprised those who accept the Council's decisions. In Mesopotamia and the Levant, the Syriac Orthodox Church serves as the patriarchal faction for the local Assyrian population, whereas the Greek Orthodox Church was primarily concentrated in coastal regions with a Greek and Hellenized Syrian majority, continuing today as the Rum.

In India and to a lesser degree in Persia, the schism that occurred was between the Syriac Orthodox Church and the Assyrian Church of the East, which continues to exist in Kerala as the two churches Syriac churches today. Moreover, there exists another Oriental Orthodox church separated from Syriac Orthodox Church called the Malankara Orthodox Syrian Church.

In the 18th century and onwards, Nontrinitarian and Unitarian Christians are necessarily non-Chalcedonian having their own separate traditions, different nontrinitarian theologies, and polities. The largest such groups are The Church of Jesus Christ of Latter-day Saints (Latter Day Saint movement), Jehovah's Witnesses and the Iglesia ni Cristo.

== See also ==
- Conference of Addis Ababa

== Sources ==
- Edwards, Mark J. (2009). Catholicity and Heresy in the Early Church. Farnham: Ashgate. ISBN 9780754662914.
- Grillmeier, Aloys (1975) [1965]. Christ in Christian Tradition: From the Apostolic Age to Chalcedon (451) (2nd revised ed.). Louisville: Westminster John Knox Press. ISBN 9780664223014.
- Gwynn, David M. (2009). "The Council of Chalcedon and the Definition of Christian Tradition". Chalcedon in Context: Church Councils 400–700. Liverpool: Liverpool University Press. pp. 7–26. ISBN 9781846316487.
- Kelly, John N. D. (2006) [1972]. Early Christian Creeds (3rd ed.). London-New York: Continuum. ISBN 9780826492166.
- Louth, Andrew (2009). "Why Did the Syrians Reject the Council of Chalcedon?". Chalcedon in Context: Church Councils 400–700. Liverpool: Liverpool University Press. pp. 107–116. ISBN 9781846316487.
- Meyendorff, John (1966). Orthodoxy and Catholicity. New York: Sheed & Ward.
- Meyendorff, John (1989). Imperial unity and Christian divisions: The Church 450-680 A.D. Crestwood, NY: St. Vladimir's Seminary Press. ISBN 9780881410563.
- Millar, Fergus (2009). "The Syriac Acts of the Second Council of Ephesus (449)". Chalcedon in Context: Church Councils 400–700. Liverpool: Liverpool University Press. pp. 45–69. ISBN 9781846316487.
- Millar, Fergus (2015). Empire, Church and Society in the Late Roman Near East: Greeks, Jews, Syrians and Saracens. Leuven: Peeters Publishers. ISBN 9789042932913.
- Ostrogorsky, George (1956). History of the Byzantine State. Oxford: Basil Blackwell.
- Price, Richard; Gaddis, Michael, eds. (2005a). The Acts of the Council of Chalcedon. Vol. 1. Liverpool: Liverpool University Press. ISBN 9780853230397.
- Price, Richard; Gaddis, Michael, eds. (2005b). The Acts of the Council of Chalcedon. Vol. 2. Liverpool: Liverpool University Press. ISBN 9780853230397.
- Price, Richard; Gaddis, Michael, eds. (2005c). The Acts of the Council of Chalcedon. Vol. 3. Liverpool: Liverpool University Press.
- Price, Richard (2009a). "The Council of Chalcedon (451): A Narrative". Chalcedon in Context: Church Councils 400–700. Liverpool: Liverpool University Press. pp. 70–91. ISBN 9781846316487.
- Price, Richard (2009b). "Truth, Omission, and Fiction in the Acts of Chalcedon". Chalcedon in Context: Church Councils 400–700. Liverpool: Liverpool University Press. pp. 92–106. ISBN 9781846316487.
- Price, Richard (2009c). "The Second Council of Constantinople (553) and the Malleable Past". Chalcedon in Context: Church Councils 400–700. Liverpool: Liverpool University Press. pp. 117–132. ISBN 9781846316487.
- Roueché, Charlotte (2009). "Acclamations at the Council of Chalcedon". Chalcedon in Context: Church Councils 400–700. Liverpool: Liverpool University Press. pp. 169–177. ISBN 9781846316487.
- Whitby, Michael (2009). "An Unholy Crew? Bishops Behaving Badly at Church Councils". Chalcedon in Context: Church Councils 400–700. Liverpool: Liverpool University Press. pp. 178–196. ISBN 9781846316487.
- Chesnut, Roberta C. (1985). Three Monophysite Christologies: Severus of Antioch, Philoxenus of Mabbug, and Jacob of Sarug. Oxford: Oxford University Press. ISBN 978-0198267126.
- de Vries, Wilhelm (1940). Sakramententheologie bei den Syrischen Monophysiten. Rome.
- Lebon, Joseph (1909). Le monophysisme sévérien. Étude historique, littéraire et théologique de la résistance monophysite au concile de Chalcédoine jusqu'à la constitution de l'Église jacobite. Louvain.
