= Severus of Antioch =

Patriarch of Antioch from 512 to 538

Saint Severus of Antioch
- Patriarch of Antioch
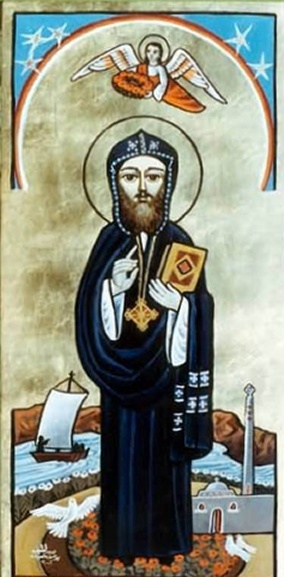
- Coptic icon of Severus of Antioch
- Church: Syriac Orthodox Church
- Installed: 16 November 512
- Term ended: 5 February 538
- Predecessor: Flavian II of Antioch
- Successor: Sergius of Tella

Personal details
- Born: c. 459 or c. 465 Sozopolis, Eastern Roman Empire
- Died: 5 February 538 Xois, Eastern Roman Empire
- Buried: Zogag Monastery
- Denomination: Oriental Orthodoxy

Sainthood
- Feast day: 8 February (Coptic Church), 29 September (Syriac Orthodox)
- Venerated in: Oriental Orthodox Churches

Severus of Antioch (Note: Greek: Σεβῆρος; Syriac: ܣܘܝܪܝܘܣ ܕܐܢܛܝܘܟܝܐ) also known as Severus of Gaza and nicknamed the Crown of the Syrians (Note: Syriac: ܬܓܐ ܕܣܘܪ̈ܝܝܐ, romanized: Tagha d'Suryoye; Arabic: تاج السريان, romanized: Taj al-Suriyan), was the Patriarch of Antioch and head of the Syriac Orthodox Church from 512 until his death in 538.

Born in Sozopolis, Severus studied grammar, rhetoric and philosophy in the city of Alexandria, Egypt. He then travelled to Berytus to study law and dedicated his time to study the works of the Church Fathers. After his baptism at the Church of Saint Leontius, Severus became a monk and entered the monastery of Peter the Iberian near Maiuma, which was a center of non-Chalcedonianism.

In 512, when Patriarch Flavian II of Antioch was deposed by Anastasius, Severus was elected as the Patriarch of Antioch after a synod was conducted in Laodicea, Syria. During the consecration ceremony, he affirmed the Councils of Nicaea, Constantinople, Ephesues and condemned the Council of Chalcedon as well as the Tome of Leo. Failing to accept the Council of Chalcedon, Justin I ordered Severus to be arrested and his tongue cut. Severus fled to Alexandria after discovering the emperor's orders. He was continued to be seen as the legitimate Patriarch of Antioch by the non-Chalcedonians. Severus continued to reside in the city of Sakha until his death on 5 February 538. His body was later shifted to Zogag monastery.

== Life ==
=== Early life ===
Severus was born in the city of Sozopolis in Pisidia in c. 459, or c. 465, into an affluent Christian family, however, later Miaphysite sources would assert that his parents were pagan. His father was a senator in the city, and his paternal grandfather, also named Severus, was the Bishop of Sozopolis and had attended the Council of Ephesus in 431. According to Severus' hagiography, he was named after his paternal grandfather as he had received a vision in which he was told, "the child who is for your son will strengthen Orthodoxy, and his name will be after your name".

After his father's death in 485, Severus travelled to Alexandria in Egypt to study grammar, rhetoric, and philosophy, in both Greek and Latin. At Alexandria, he met Zacharias of Mytilene, a fellow student and friend, who persuaded him to read the works of Gregory of Nazianzus, and Basil of Caesarea, in particular his correspondence with Libanius. According to Zacharias, whilst students at Alexandria, he and Severus discovered and destroyed a hoard of pagan idols at the neighbouring city of Menouthis.

In the autumn of 486, Severus travelled to Berytus and studied law and philosophy at its law school, where he was later joined by Zacharias in 487. At Berytus, Severus and Zacharias led the expulsion of necromancers and enchanters from the city, and Severus began to dedicate his free time to studying the works of the Fathers of the Church. At this time, he joined a group of students led by a certain Evagrius who prayed together at the Church of the Resurrection every evening. Severus was convinced to be baptised, as he had not yet undergone baptism due to the Pisidian custom in which men could not be baptised until they had grown a beard. In 488, he was baptised at the Church of Saint Leontius at Tripolis with Evagrius as his sponsor.

=== Monkhood ===
Severus subsequently adopted an ascetic life whereby he rejected bathing and also adopted fasting. He initially intended to return to Pisidia and practise law, but, after a pilgrimage to the Church of Saint Leontius in Tripolis, the head of John the Baptist at Emesa, and Jerusalem, he resolved to join Evagrius and become a monk. Severus entered the monastery of Peter the Iberian near Maiuma in Palestine, a prominent centre of non-Chalcedonianism, and remained there for several years. He later joined a monastic brotherhood in the desert near Eleutheropolis under the archimandrite Mamas. Severus practised asceticism in the desert until c. 500, at which time he became ill and was forced to recover at the Monastery of Saint Romanus in Maiuma, where he was ordained a priest by Epiphanius, Bishop of Magydus. At Maiuma, Severus received his inheritance from his parents; he shared the property with his brothers, donated most of his share to the poor, and constructed a monastery.

On a walk outside the city, Severus came upon a hermit who left his cave to call out, "Welcome to you Severus, teacher of Orthodoxy, and Patriarch of Antioch", despite never meeting Severus, the hermit thus prophesied Severus' ascension to the patriarchal throne. He remained at his monastery until 507 or 508, at which time Nephalius, a Chalcedonian monk, arrived at Maiuma and preached against Severus and other non-Chalcedonians. In 508, Nephalius wrote an apologia of the Council of Chalcedon, to which Severus replied in his two Orationes ad Nephalium. In the same year, Patriarch Elias I of Jerusalem commissioned Nephalius to expel non-Chalcedonian monks from their monasteries in Palestine, and Severus was sent to Constantinople in order to complain this to Emperor Anastasius I.

Severus travelled to Constantinople alongside 200 non-Chalcedonian monks, and gained favour with the emperor soon after his arrival. Patriarch Macedonius II of Constantinople attempted to sway Anastasius to support the Council of Chalcedon and presented the emperor with a collection of edited excerpts from the works of Cyril of Alexandria, an important Father of the Church who had died prior to the council. Severus, however, wrote Philalethes, and refuted Macedonius as the work of Cyril presented to the emperor was shown to be taken out of context. At Constantinople, Severus became friends with Julian, Bishop of Halicarnassus. Under Severus' influence, in 510, Anastasius allowed non-Chalcedonians to retake their monasteries. In c. 511, the emperor issued a typos (edict) that adopted the non-Chalcedonian interpretation of the Henotikon as law. After Macedonius' deposition and his succession by Timothy I of Constantinople, a non-Chalcedonian, in August 511, Severus returned to his monastery in Palestine.

=== Patriarch of Antioch ===
In 512, Flavian II, Patriarch of Antioch, was deposed by Anastasius, and a synod was held at Laodicea in Syria to elect a successor. Severus was elected on 6 November and consecrated at the Great Church of Antioch on 16 November. The consecration ceremony was attended by the bishops Dionysius of Tarsus, Nicias of Laodicea, Philoxenus of Mabbug, Peter of Beroea, Simeon of Chalcis, Marion of Sura, Eusebius of Gabbula, Silvanus of Urima, Sergius of Cyrrhus, John of Europus, Philoxenus of Doliche, and Iulianus of Salamias. During the consecration ceremony, he affirmed the councils of Nicaea, Constantinople, and Ephesus, and the Henotikon. Despite orders from Anastasius to not act or speak against the Council of Chalcedon, Severus condemned the council, as well as Pope Leo's Tome, Nestorius, Eutyches, Diodorus of Tarsus, Theodore of Mopsuestia, Ibas of Edessa, Barsauma, and Cyrus and John of Aigai. However, Severus could not be heard due to the shouting and commotion by the people who attended the ceremony. He signed a declaration of faith at the ceremony's conclusion which was witnessed by 13 bishops.

Upon his consecration, Severus had the baths at the patriarchal palace destroyed and the cooks sent away, in keeping with his abstinence from luxurious bathing and eating. He was accepted as Patriarch of Antioch by Patriarch Timothy I of Constantinople and Pope John II (III) of Alexandria, but Patriarch Elias I of Jerusalem and other bishops refused to acknowledge him. Couriers taking synodical letters from Severus to Jerusalem were expelled from the city by Sabbas the Sanctified and a crowd congregated at the Church of the Holy Sepulchre and chanted, "anathema to Severus and his fellow communicants". Within Syria, Severus was popular amongst the population of the province of Syria Prima, which had largely adopted non-Chalcedonianism, whereas the province of Syria Secunda, which was home to a large Greek population who favoured Chalcedonianism, was hostile towards Severus.

A synod was held at Tyre in Phoenicia in c. 514, at which the Council of Chalcedon and Leo's Tome was denounced, and Severus declared that the Henotikon had annulled the acts of the Council of Chalcedon. Severus began to exchange letters with Sergius the Grammarian at this time as Sergius had written to Antoninus, Bishop of Aleppo, who had asked Severus to respond. Sergius argued that the Synod of Tyre had made serious concessions to Chalcedonians, to which Severus responded with a treatise against Sergius. As patriarch, Severus and Peter of Apamea, Archbishop of Apamea, were alleged to have hired Jewish mercenaries to kill 250 Chalcedonian pilgrims and leave their bodies unburied by the roadside. Chalcedonians also claimed that the monasteries that the pilgrims had fled to were set alight and the monks that had protected them were also killed. Between 514 and 518, John of Caesarea wrote an apologia of the Council of Chalcedon in response to Severus' Philalethes. Severus wrote a treatise in defence of Philalethes, and began work on a reply to John of Caesarea.

=== Exile and death ===
Following Anastasius' death and his succession by Emperor Justin I in July 518, the bishops of Syria Secunda travelled to Constantinople and clamoured for Severus' deposition. Justin I demanded Severus to affirm the Council of Chalcedon, to which he refused. The emperor subsequently ordered Irenaeus, Count of the East, to arrest Severus and cut out his tongue. On 29 September 518, Severus fled Antioch by boat to Alexandria, where he was well received by Pope Timothy III of Alexandria and the city's inhabitants. Severus' arrival in Egypt is celebrated by the Coptic Orthodox Church on 12 October. Despite his deposition, Severus did not cease to be seen as the legitimate Patriarch of Antioch by non-Chalcedonians.

During his exile in Egypt, Severus resided at the monastery of the Ennaton with Pope Timothy, and is known to have performed a number of miracles. He completed his three volume book, liber contra impium grammaticum, against John of Caesarea in c. 519. In his exile, Julian of Halicarnassus also took up residence at the monastery of the Ennaton and exchanged letters with Severus on the topic of the body of Christ. Whereas Julian had adopted aphthartodocetism, which argued that the body of Christ was incorruptible, Severus argued that the body of Christ was corruptible until the resurrection. He wrote five treatises against Julian, who responded in peri aphtharsias and an apologia. The non-Chalcedonian community was quickly divided between "Severians", followers of Severus, and aphthartodocetae, and divisions remained unresolved until 527. The Severians were also known as the Pthartolatrae.

Emperor Justinian, who succeeded his uncle Justin I in 527, held a three-day synod at the Palace of Hormisdas in the spring of 532 at Constantinople to restore unity to the church through dialogue between five Chalcedonians and five or more non-Chalcedonians. The emperor invited Severus and promised immunity, however, he chose not to attend on the grounds of age and as he was accused of corruption and bribery, which he vehemently denied. In c. 534, the non-Chalcedonian community faced further division with the separation of the Themistians from the Severians. Their leader, Themistius Calonymus, a deacon at Alexandria, saw himself as defending the Severan view, nevertheless, a new sect was founded after him advocating a more extreme belief of Christ's corruptibility. At the invitation of Justinian, in the winter of c. 534, Severus travelled to Constantinople alongside Peter of Apamea and the monk Zooras. At this time, Anthimus I of Constantinople, Archbishop of Trebizond, was consecrated the Patriarch of Constantinople and he refused to affirm the Council of Chalcedon. Severus successfully convinced Anthimus I to adopt a position in line with himself and Pope Theodosius I of Alexandria.

Severus' fortunes were quickly overturned as Pope Agapetus I of Rome arrived at Constantinople in March 536. Agapetus swayed Justinian to adopt a firm Chalcedonian position and Anthimus I was replaced by Menas of Constantinople. Menas held a synod from 2 May to 4 June, at the conclusion of which Severus, Anthimus, Peter of Apamea, and Zooras were excommunicated. On 6 August 536, Justinian issued an edict that charged Severus, Anthimus, Peter, and Zooras with Nestorianism and Eutychianism, banned Severus' books, and banished them from the capital and all major cities. Severus fled Constantinople with the aid of Empress Theodora and returned to Egypt. He resided at the residence of Dorotheus in the city of Sakha until his death on 5 February 538. Dorotheus had Severus' body moved to the Zogag Monastery, and the relocation of his body is celebrated on 19 December.

== Works ==
Severus' known writings were composed in Greek, his native language. Through his education in Beirut he acquired proficiency in Latin, allowing him to quote Western church fathers like Cyprian of Carthage and Augustine of Hippo. However, because his writings were condemned by the emperor in 536, they are better preserved in Syriac translation. Although he must have been well exposed to Syriac during his time as patriarch, there is no evidence Severus ever learned it.

Severus' best-preserved writings are homilies and theological treatises. Although he wrote many letters in Greek, only a few survive in Syriac translation. Several hymns attributed to him are found in the Syriac Octoechos, and some excerpts of biblical exegesis are found in various Greek catenae.

=== Homilies ===
The Cathedral Homilies is a collection of 123 sermons preached while Severus was patriarch. They survive in two Syriac recensions: the original translation, probably by Paul of Callinicum, and a later revision made by Jacob of Edessa. The 77th homily is the only one that survives in its original Greek, and only because it was mistakenly attributed to Gregory of Nyssa or Hesychius of Jerusalem.

The 123rd homily is famously anti-Manichaean. Parts of it have been translated by Kugener and Cumont. In this work he mentions an unnamed book by Mani, which is possibly The Pragmateia, a Manichaean work now lost, but not certain. Although he opposed the Manichaeans, as he writes "From where did the Manichaeans, who are more wicked than any other, get the idea of introducing two principles, both uncreated and without beginning, that is good and evil, light and darkness, which they also call matter?", his direct citations and explanations of Manichaean beliefs are considered a valuable source by Western scholarship, as the works he cites from are otherwise lost, and his citations of Manichaean texts are among the longest we possess.

=== Theological treatises ===
His theological treatises are mostly polemical. Among them are the anti-Chalcedonian works:

- Against the Grammarian, directed against John of Caesarea
- Discourses addressed to Nephalius
- Philalethes

He also wrote against more extreme anti-Chalcedonians, like Julian of Halicarnassus and Sergius the Grammarian.

== Bibliography ==
- Allen, Pauline; Hayward, Charles T. R. (2004). Severus of Antioch. Routledge. ISBN 978-1-134-56780-5.
- Arthur, Rosemary A. (2008). Pseudo-Dionysius as Polemicist - The Development and Purpose of the Angelic Hierarchy in Sixth Century Syria. Ashgate Publishing. ISBN 978-0-7546-6258-7.
- Atiya, Aziz Suryal, ed. (1991). "Agnoetae". Coptic Encyclopedia. Vol. 1. Macmillan Publishers. cols. 70b–71a.
- Bacchus, Francis Joseph (1911). "Mennas" . In Herbermann, Charles (ed.). Catholic Encyclopedia. Vol. 10. New York: Robert Appleton Company.
- Baker-Brian, Nicholas J. Manichaeism - An ancient faith rediscovered. T&T Clark.
- Barsoum, Ignatius Aphrem (2003). The Scattered Pearls: A History of Syriac Literature and Sciences. Translated by Moosa, Matti (2nd rev. ed.). Gorgias Press.
- Bates, William (1852). College Lectures on Ecclesiastical History, 3rd ed. John W. Parker and Son.
- Brock, Sebastian P. (1975). "Some New Letters of the Patriarch Severos". Studia Patristica. 12: 17–24. ISBN 978-0-8028-0581-2.
- Brock, Sebastian P. (2010). "Jacob the Annotator - Jacob's Annotations to His Revised Translation of Severus' Cathedral Homilies". Studies on Jacob of Edessa. Gorgias Press. pp. 1–13. doi:10.31826/9781463216634-002. ISBN 978-1-4632-1663-4.
- Brock, Sebastian P. (2011). "Severus of Antioch". Gorgias Encyclopedic Dictionary of the Syriac Heritage. Beth Mardutho.
- Brock, Sebastian P. (2016). "A Letter from the Orthodox Monasteries of the Orient Sent to Alexandria, Addressed to Severos". Severus of Antioch - His Life and Times. Brill Publishers. pp. 32–46. ISBN 978-90-04-30799-5.
- Brock, Sebastian P. (2016). "Miaphysite, not Monophysite!". Cristianesimo Nella Storia. 37 (1): 45–52. ISBN 978-88-15-26168-7.
- Brock, Sebastian P. (2017). "Patriarch Severos' Letter on his Flight from Antioch in 518" (PDF). Hugoye - Journal of Syriac Studies. 20 (1): 25–50. doi:10.31826/hug-2018-200103. S2CID 212688775.
- Chapman, John (1911). "Monophysites and Monophysitism". Catholic Encyclopedia. Vol. 10. New York: Robert Appleton Company.
- Constantelos, Demetrios J. (1987). "Julian of Halicarnassus". Encyclopedia of Religion – via Encyclopedia.com.
- Cross, F. L.; Livingstone, E. A., eds. (2009) [2005]. "Agnoetae". The Oxford Dictionary of the Christian Church (3rd rev. ed.). Oxford University Press. ISBN 978-0-19-280290-3.
- Evans, J. A. S. (2000). The Age of Justinian: The Circumstances of Imperial Power. Routledge. doi:10.4324/9780203133033.
- Gardner, Iain; Lieu, Samuel N. C. Manichaean Texts from the Roman Empire. Cambridge University Press. doi:10.1017/CBO9780511616891.
- Gregory, Timothy E. (1991). "Severos". In Kazhdan, Alexander P. (ed.). Oxford Dictionary of Byzantium. Oxford University Press. doi:10.1093/acref/9780195046526.001.0001. ISBN 978-0-19-504652-6.
- Honigmann, Ernest (1947). "The Patriarchate of Antioch - A Revision of Le Quien and the Notitia Antiochena". Traditio. 5: 135–161. doi:10.1017/S0362152900013544. JSTOR 27830138. S2CID 151905022.
- Horn, Cornelia B. (2006). Asceticism and Christological Controversy in Fifth-Century Palestine - The Career of Peter the Iberian. Oxford University Press. ISBN 978-0-19-927753-7.
- Kazhdan, Alexander (1991). "John of Caesarea". Oxford Dictionary of Byzantium. Oxford University Press. ISBN 978-0-19-504652-6.
- Knezevich, Linda (1991). "Severus of Antioch". Coptic Encyclopedia. Vol. 7.
- Kugener, M.-A.; Cumont, Franz (1912). Recherches sur le Manichéisme - II Extrait de la CXXIIIe Homélie de Sévère d'Antioche (in French). Lamertin.
- Menze, Volker (2012). Encyclopedia of Ancient History. Wiley. doi:10.1002/9781444338386.wbeah12190. ISBN 978-1-4443-3838-6.
- Meyendorff, John (1989). Imperial unity and Christian divisions - The Church 450-680 A.D. St. Vladimir's Seminary Press. ISBN 978-0-88141-055-6.
- Roche, P. (2003). "Peter of Apamea". New Catholic Encyclopedia – via Encyclopedia.com.
- Stokes, G. T. (1887). "Themistius (1)". In Smith, William; Wace, Henry (eds.). A Dictionary of Christian Biography. Vol. 4. John Murray. p. 898.
- Torrance, Iain (1998). Christology After Chalcedon - Severus of Antioch and Sergius the Monophysite. Wipf and Stock Publishers. ISBN 978-1-57910-110-7.
- Wace, Henry; Piercy, William C., eds. (1911a). "Severus, patriarch of Antioch" . Dictionary of Christian Biography and Literature to the End of the Sixth Century (3rd ed.). London: John Murray.
- Wace, Henry; Piercy, William C., eds. (1911b). "Petrus, bp. of Apamea" . Dictionary of Christian Biography and Literature to the End of the Sixth Century (3rd ed.). London: John Murray.
- Witakowski, Witold (2004). "Severus of Antioch in Ethiopian Tradition". Studia Aethiopica. Harrassowitz Verlag. ISBN 978-3-447-04891-0.
- Youssef, Youhanna Nessim (2015). "Severus of Antioch". Wiley Blackwell Companion to Patristics. John Wiley & Sons. ISBN 978-1-118-43871-8.
- Zachhuber, Johannes (2018). "Personhood in Miaphysitism - Severus of Antioch and John Philoponus". Personhood in the Byzantine Christian Tradition - Early, Medieval, and Modern Perspectives. Routledge. pp. 29–43. doi:10.4324/9781315600185-4.
- Zissis, Theodore (1987). "Severus of Antioch, trans. Philip M. McGhee". Encyclopedia of Religion – via Encyclopedia.com.

Preceded by Flavian II	Patriarch of Antioch; 512–518	Succeeded by Paul the Jew
Preceded by Office created	Syriac Orthodox Patriarch of Antioch; 512–538	Succeeded by Sergius of Tella
