= Miaphysitism =

Christological doctrine

Miaphysitism (/maɪˈæfɪsaɪtɪzəm, miː-/) is the Christological doctrine that holds Jesus, the Incarnate Word, is fully divine and fully human, in one nature or physis (Ancient Greek: φύσις). It is the position held by the Oriental Orthodox Churches. It differs from the dyophysitism of the Catholic Church, Eastern Orthodox Church, the Church of the East and major Protestant denominations, which holds that Jesus is one person with two natures (divine and human) as defined by the Council of Chalcedon in 451.

While historically a major point of controversy within Christianity, some modern declarations by both Chalcedonian and Miaphysite churches claim that the difference between the two Christological formulations does not reflect any significant difference in belief about the nature of Christ. Other statements from both Chalcedonian and Miaphysite churches claim that such difference is indeed theological but has been "widened by non-theological factors".

== Terminology ==
The word miaphysite derives from the Ancient Greek terms μία (mía, 'one') and φύσις (phýsis, 'nature'). Miaphysites claim that the teaching is based on Cyril of Alexandria's formula mia physis tou theou logou sesarkomene, meaning 'One incarnate physis of God the Word' (or 'One enfleshed physis...'). The word sesarkomene (meaning 'enfleshed') is given in the nominative feminine case, and hence is describing the physis as incarnate. This is often incorrectly translated as 'One physis of God the incarnate Word', which would require the genitive masculine case sesarkomenou. In his Second Letter to Succensus, Cyril clarifies that the nature (physis) is incarnate:

For if we say that the Only Begotten Son of God, who was incarnate and became man, is One, then this does not mean as they would suppose that he has been 'mixed' or that the nature of the Word has been transformed into the nature of flesh, or that of the flesh into the Word's. No, each nature is understood to remain in all its natural characteristics for the reasons we have just given, though they are ineffably and inexpressibly united, and this is how he demonstrated to us the one nature of the Son; though of course, as I have said, it is the 'incarnate nature' I mean.

Early miaphysite Christians (including Cyril and his successor, Dioscoros) claim such terminology was furthermore present in early patristic writers such as Athanasius of Alexandria, Julius I of Rome, and Gregory Thaumaturgus. This is disputed, with the scholarly consensus suggesting that this formula originated from the writings of Apollinaris of Laodicea, who espoused a form of monophysitism called Apollinarism. Apollinarism was condemned in the First Council of Constantinople, and was also explicitly rejected by Cyril in his First Letter to Succensus, though Cyril does support the mia physis formula in the same letter.

The 451 Council of Chalcedon used physis to mean a set of properties appropriate to an ousia ('essence'), and defined that there is in Christ one hypostasis but two physeis ('natures'). It is disputed whether Cyril used physis in that sense. John Anthony McGuckin says that in Cyril's formula "physis serves as a rough semantic equivalent to hypostasis". The 431 Council of Ephesus used physis to signify the single subjecthood of Christ and also condemned speaking of two physeis ('natures') in various homilies contained within the official minutes.

Others interpret the miaphysite term physis in line with its use by the Council of Chalcedon and speak of "miaphysitism" as "monophysitism", a word used for all forms of denial of the Chalcedonian doctrine. However, they add that "miaphysitism" is "the more accurate term for the position held by the Syriac, Coptic and Armenian churches". The Second Council of Constantinople, held in 553 following Chalcedon, accepted Cyril's phrase but warned against misinterpreting it.

Etymologically, mia‑physis and mono‑physis both mean 'one nature'. However, mia‑physis has come to denote the specific Severian theology that understands the union of Christ's natures as a single nature by composition, interpreted by Miaphysites as Cyrillian (the formula mia physis being drawn from his writings), rather than the Eutychian view of union by mixing or other forms of 'one‑nature' (monophysite) theology (e.g., one purely human nature, one purely divine nature). Strictly speaking, by meaning alone, Miaphysites (Severians) are a type of monophysite, but a distinct kind and not to be confused with other non‑miaphysite monophysites (such as Eutychians or Ebionites). In recent times, Miaphysites have adopted "miaphysite" as a self‑designation; conversely, "monophysite" has been used to label non‑miaphysite monophysites (especially Eutychians) and is considered by many miaphysites to be pejorative and inaccurate to describe their theology.

The broad term "dyophysitism" covers not only Chalcedonian teaching but also interpretations like Nestorianism which held that Jesus is not only of two natures but is in fact two centers of attribution, which may imply two persons, a view nominally rejected by Chalcedonians. Likewise, "monophysitism" includes both Oriental Orthodox teaching and Eutychianism, the latter maintaining that after the union, the eternal Son possessed a single synthesized nature, neither purely divine nor purely human, identical with neither. Miaphysites reject Eutychianism: they hold that the incarnate Christ has one nature that is fully divine and fully human, retaining the properties of both without mingling, confusion ("pouring together"), or change.

To avoid confusion with Eutychians, the Oriental Orthodox Churches reject the label "monophysite". The Coptic Metropolitan Bishop of Damiette declared it a misnomer to call them monophysites, for "they always confessed the continuity of existence of the two natures in the one incarnate nature of the Word of God. Non[e] of the natures ceased to exist because of the union and the term 'mia physis' denoting the incarnate nature is completely different from the term 'monophysites' [...] The Oriental Orthodox do not believe in a single nature in Jesus Christ but rather a united divine-human nature."

The Agreed Statement by the Anglican–Oriental Orthodox International Commission in 2014 also declared:

The term 'monophysite', which has been falsely used to describe the Christology of the Oriental Orthodox Churches, is both misleading and offensive as it implies Eutychianism. Anglicans, together with the wider oikumene, use the accurate term 'miaphysite' to refer to the Cyrilline teaching of the family of Oriental Orthodox Churches, and furthermore call each of these Churches by their official title of "Oriental Orthodox". The teaching of this family confesses not a single nature but one incarnate united divine-human nature of the Word of God. To say "a single nature" would be to imply that the human nature was absorbed in his divinity, as was taught by Eutyches.

== Conflict ==
Christological spectrum c. 5th–7th centuries (miaphysitism in red)

The conflict over terminology was to some extent a conflict between two renowned theological schools. The Catechetical School of Alexandria focused on the divinity of Christ as the Logos or Word of God and thereby risked leaving his real humanity out of proper consideration (cf. Apollinarism). The stress by the School of Antioch was on the humanity of Jesus as a historical figure. Layered onto this theological rivalry was political competition between Alexandria on one side, and Antioch and Constantinople on the other.

The condemnation of Nestorius at the Council of Ephesus (431) was a victory for the Alexandrian school, but acceptance required compromise: the Formula of Reunion agreed by Cyril of Alexandria and John of Antioch in 433. Cyril died in 444, and under his successor, Dioscurus I of Alexandria, a Constantinople‑based archimandrite named Eutyches, whose responses were judged heretical by Bishop Flavian of Constantinople, accused Flavian himself of heresy. The emperor convoked another council in Ephesus and placed Dioscurus as the presiding bishop. This Second Council of Ephesus (449) rehabilitated Eutyches after his confession was deemed orthodox by the bishops, and condemned & deposed Flavian and other bishops. They appealed to Pope Leo I, who denounced the assembly as a latrocinium (robber council) instead of a regular concilium, declaring it null and void. Today the Oriental Orthodox Churches recognize that council as valid.

The Council of Chalcedon (451) annulled the earlier council presided over by Dioscurus. It was not accepted by the Oriental Orthodox Churches, who do not defend Eutyches and instead accept his implicit condemnation by the Third Council of Ephesus (475). Chalcedon accepted by acclamation Leo's Tome — the letter by Pope Leo I setting out, as he saw it, the imperial church's doctrine on the matter — and issued the Chalcedonian Definition. The clause most relevant to miaphysitism states:"

Following, then, the holy Fathers, we all unanimously teach that our Lord Jesus Christ is to us One and the same Son, the Self-same Perfect in Godhead, the Self-same Perfect in Manhood; truly God and truly Man; the Self-same of a rational soul and body; co-essential with the Father according to the Godhead, the Self-same co-essential with us according to the Manhood; like us in all things, sin apart; before the ages begotten of the Father as to the Godhead, but in the last days, the Self-same, for us and for our salvation (born) of Mary the Virgin Theotokos as to the Manhood; One and the Same Christ, Son, Lord, Only-begotten; acknowledged in Two Natures unconfusedly, unchangeably, indivisibly, inseparably; the difference of the Natures being in no way removed because of the Union, but rather the properties of each Nature being preserved, and (both) concurring into One Person and One Hypostasis; not as though He was parted or divided into Two Persons, but One and the Self-same Son and Only-begotten God, Word, Lord, Jesus Christ; even as from the beginning the prophets have taught concerning Him, and as the Lord Jesus Christ Himself hath taught us, and as the Symbol of the Fathers hath handed down to us.

— Bindley, T. Herbert, ed. (1899). The Oecumenical Documents of the Faith. London: Methuen.

Dissent from this definition did not at first lead to a clean break between what are now the Eastern Orthodox Church and the Oriental Orthodox Churches. While in the West, Rome tended to uphold steadfastly the text of Leo's Tome and of the Chalcedonian definition, the situation in the East was fluid for a century after the council, with compromise formulas imposed by the emperors and accepted by the church and leading at times to schisms between East and West (cf. Acacian Schism, Henotikon, Monoenergism). Initially, before the campaigns of Justin and Justinian against the miaphysites, they comprised the majority of the East at the time. The situation then hardened into a fixed division between the Oriental Orthodox Churches and the Chalcedonian churches, the latter which later split into the Eastern Orthodox Church and the Catholic Church (and its Protestant offshoots).

== Thoughts of resolution ==
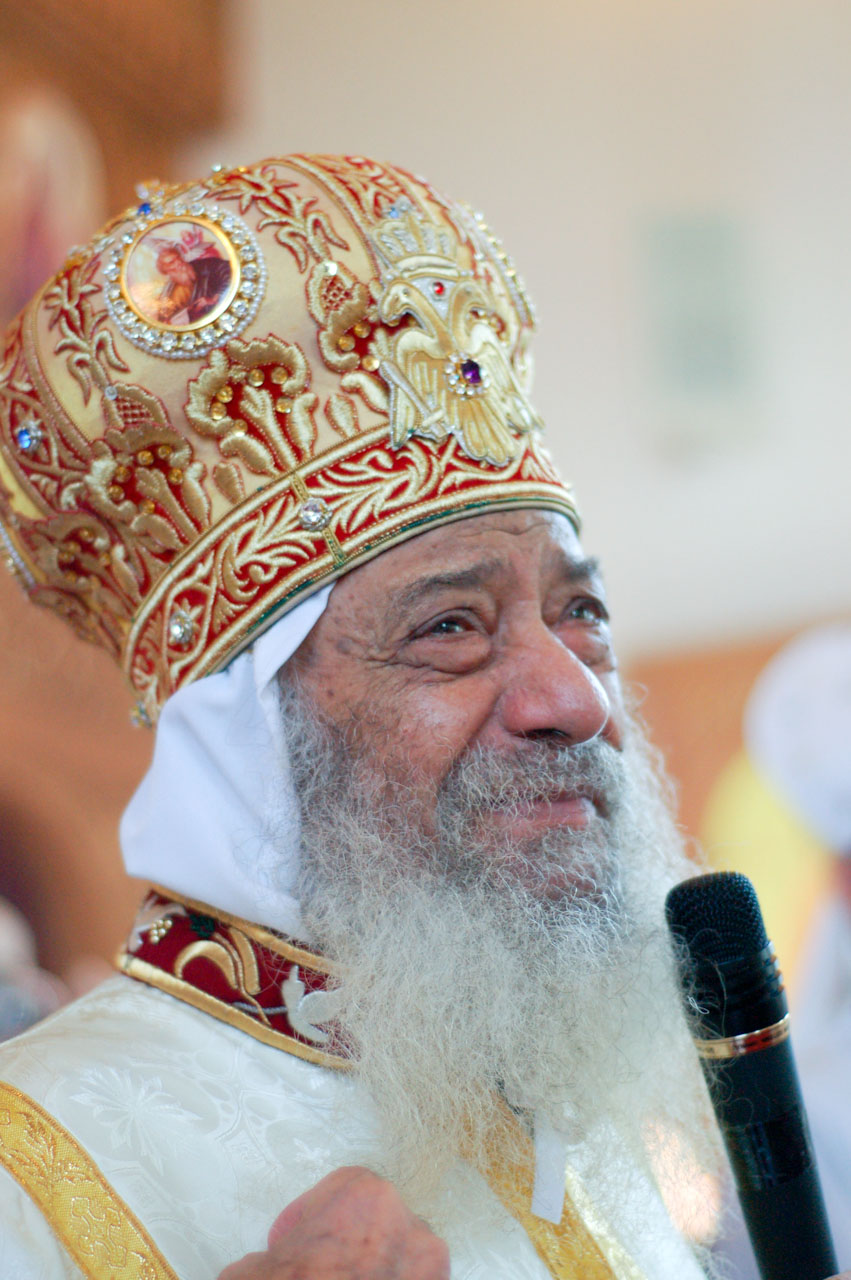
Pope Shenouda III, Patriarch of Alexandria and All Africa, was among the forerunners of ecumenical dialogue between the Oriental Orthodox Churches and other Christian communions

In recent decades, a number of Christological agreements between Miaphysite and Chalcedonian churches have been signed by theologians and church leaders, including with the Eastern Orthodox Church, Roman Catholic Church, Eastern Catholic Churches, the Anglicans and other Protestant churches.

=== Catholic Church ===
On 20 May 1973, Pope Shenouda III of Alexandria and Pope Paul VI of Rome jointly signed a common declaration that explicitly distinguishes Christ's divinity and humanity without necessarily using the phrase "two natures":

We confess that our Lord and God and Saviour and King of us all, Jesus Christ, is perfect God with respect to His Divinity, perfect man with respect to His humanity. In Him His divinity is united with His humanity in a real, perfect union without mingling, without commixtion, without confusion, without alteration, without division, without separation. His divinity did not separate from His humanity for an instant, not for the twinkling of an eye. He who is God eternal and invisible became visible in the flesh, and took upon Himself the form of a servant. In Him are preserved all the properties of the divinity and all the properties of the humanity, together in a real, perfect, indivisible and inseparable union.

— Common Declaration of Pope of Rome Paul VI and of the Pope of Alexandria Shenouda III

At that meeting they agreed to establish an official theological dialogue between the two Churches. On 12 February 1988 the commission conducting that dialogue signed "a common formula expressing our official agreement on Christology", which had already been approved by the Holy Synod of the Coptic Orthodox Church on 21 June 1986. The brief common formula was as follows:

We believe that our Lord, God and Saviour Jesus Christ, the Incarnate-Logos, is perfect in His Divinity and perfect in His Humanity. He made His Humanity one with His Divinity without mixture nor mingling, nor confusion. His Divinity was not separated from His Humanity even for a moment or twinkling of an eye. At the same time, we anathematize the doctrines of both Nestorius and Eutyches.

— Mixed Commission of the Dialogue between the Catholic Church and the Coptic Orthodox Church: Common formula on Christology

A "Doctrinal Agreement on Christology" was signed on 3 June 1990 by Baselios Mar Thoma Mathews I, Catholicos of the Malankara Orthodox Syrian Church, and Pope John Paul II, in which they explicitly spoke of "divine and human natures":

Our Lord Jesus Christ is one, perfect in his humanity and perfect in his divinity – at once consubstantial with the Father in his divinity, and consubstantial with us in his humanity. His humanity is one with his divinity – without change, without commingling, without division and without separation. In the Person of the Eternal Logos Incarnate are united and active in a real and perfect way the divine and human natures, with all their properties, faculties and operations. ... It is this faith which we both confess. Its content is the same in both communions; in formulating that content in the course of history, however, differences have arisen, in terminology and emphasis. We are convinced that these differences are such as can co-exist in the same communion and therefore need not and should not divide us, especially when we proclaim Him to our brothers and sisters in the world in terms which they can more easily understand.

— Doctrinal Agreement on Christology approved by Pope John Paul II and Catholicos Mar Baselius Marthoma Mathews I of the Malankara Orthodox Syrian Church, 3 June 1990

Similar accords were signed by the head of the Catholic Church and the heads of the Syriac Orthodox Church and the Armenian Apostolic Church.

In 1984, John Paul II and the head of the Syriac Orthodox Church, Patriarch Ignatius Zakka I, signed a declaration allowing, "in certain circumstances", the faithful to receive the sacraments of penance, Eucharist, and anointing of the sick from either Community. Another 1994 agreement permitted Catholics and members of the Malankara Orthodox Syrian Church to receive the sacrament of matrimony from either church.

Ecumenical dialogue between the two churches was suspended following Rome's declarations on Fiducia supplicans (same‑sex blessings) and further statements by Pope Francis on homosexual unions.

=== Eastern Orthodox ===
Although unofficial dialogue between individual theologians of the Eastern Orthodox and the Oriental Orthodox began in 1964, official dialogue did not begin until 1985. By 1989 the two sides reached agreement on Christology, stating that in Cyril of Alexandria's formula the word physis refers to the hypostasis of Christ—the one eternal Person (one of the three hypostases) of the Trinity—who "became incarnate of the Holy Spirit and the Blessed Virgin Mary, Theotokos, and thus became man, consubstantial with us in his humanity but without sin. He is true God and true man at the same time, perfect in his divinity, perfect in his humanity. Because the one whom she bore was at the same time fully God as well as fully human, we call the Blessed Virgin Theotokos. When we speak of the one composite hypostasis of our Lord Jesus Christ, we do not say that in him a divine hypostasis and a human hypostasis came together. Rather, the one eternal hypostasis of the Second Person of the Trinity has assumed our created human nature, uniting it with his own uncreated divine nature to form an inseparably and unconfusedly united real divine‑human being, the natures being distinguished from each other only in contemplation."

A second agreed statement was published in the following year, 1990, declaring:

The Orthodox agree that the Oriental Orthodox will continue to maintain their traditional Cyrillian terminology of "one nature of the incarnate Logos" (μία φύσις τοῦ θεοῦ λόγου σεσαρκωμένη), since they acknowledge the double consubstantiality of the Logos which Eutyches denied. The Orthodox also use this terminology. The Oriental Orthodox agree that the Orthodox are justified in their use of the two-natures formula, since they acknowledge that the distinction is "in thought alone" (τῇ θεωρίᾳ μόνῃ). ... we have now clearly understood that both families have always loyally maintained the same authentic Orthodox Christological faith, and the unbroken continuity of the apostolic tradition, though they have used Christological terms in different ways. It is this common faith and continuous loyalty to the Apostolic Tradition that should be the basis for our unity and communion.

— Joint Commission Of The Theological Dialogue Between The Orthodox Church And The Oriental Orthodox Churches, Second Agreed Statement (1990)

Implementing the recommendations of these two Agreed Statements would theoretically restore full communion between the Eastern Orthodox and the Oriental Orthodox Churches, but as of 2021 they have not been enacted. Among the Eastern Orthodox, only the patriarchates of Alexandria, Antioch, and Romania have accepted the Statements; among the Oriental Orthodox, the Coptic, Syriac, and Malankara churches have accepted them. The Russian Orthodox Church (Moscow Patriarchate) has requested clarification on some points, and the monastic community of Mount Athos rejects any form of dialogue, whether with the Oriental Orthodox or others.

== See also ==
- Incarnation (Christianity)
- Communicatio idiomatum
- Documenta Monophysitarum
- Arianism
- Soteriology
- Ecumenism
- East–West Schism
- Schism of 1552
