= Eutychianism =

Specific understanding of how the human and divine relate within the person of Jesus

The Eutychianist view of Christ's nature

Eutychianism, also known as Real Monophysitism, is a set of Christian theological doctrines derived from the ideas of Eutyches of Constantinople (c. 380 – c. 456). Eutychianism is a monophysite understanding of how the human and divine relate within the person of Jesus Christ, with Christ being in one nature and of two, with the humanity of Christ subsumed by the divinity.

Eutychians were often labelled Phantasiasts by their adversaries, who accused their Christology of reducing Jesus' incarnation to a phantasm.

== Overview ==
At various times, Eutyches taught that the human nature of Christ was overcome by the divine or that Christ had a human nature but it was unlike the rest of humanity. One formulation is that Eutychianism stressed the unity of Christ's nature to such an extent that Christ's divinity consumed his humanity as the ocean consumes a drop of vinegar. Eutyches maintained that Christ was of two natures but not in two natures: separate divine and human natures had united and blended in such a manner that although Jesus was homoousion with the Father, he was not homoousion with the man.

Eutychianism was rejected at the Fourth Ecumenical Council in Chalcedon in 451 and the statement of faith known as the Chalcedonian Creed. The reaction against Eutychianism also led to the schism with Oriental Orthodoxy.

== Historical background ==
As the Christian Church grew and developed, the complexity of its understanding of the Triune God and the person of Christ also grew and developed. It's important to understand the controversies of Christology regarding its parallel with the organisation of the church, as they are ideally united as one, the latter seen as the body of Christ. In 325, the issue of how to reconcile the claims of monotheism with the assertion of the divinity of Jesus of Nazareth was largely settled at the First Ecumenical Council held at Nicaea.

Especially among the Greek-speaking Christians, attention turned to how to understand how the second person of the Trinity became incarnate in the person of Jesus Christ. The Nicene Creed said that Jesus was "of one Being (ousia) with (God) the Father" and that he "was incarnate of the Holy Spirit and the Virgin Mary and became truly human." However, neither the Nicene Creed nor the canons of the Council provided a detailed explanation of how God became human in the person of Jesus, leaving the door open for speculation.

One such theory of how the human and divine interact in the person of Jesus was put forward by the Patriarch of Constantinople, Nestorius (c. 386–451). Nestorius, a student of the Antiochene school of theology, taught that in the incarnation two distinct hypostases ("substances" or, as Nestorius' critics such as John Cassian and Cyril of Alexandria employed the term, "persons") were conjoined in Jesus Christ: one human (the man) and one divine (the Word). Thus, Mary should not be considered the God-bearer (Theotokos) since she only contributed to and bore the human nature of Christ, making her the Christotokos.

In 431, Nestorius and his teachings were condemned by the Third Ecumenical Council, held in Ephesus, which defined the Church of the East. The Council of Ephesus did not answer the question of how the human and divine interrelated in the person of Christ. It seemingly rejected any attempted answer that stressed the duality of Christ's natures to the expense of his unity as a single hypostasis (understood to mean "person").

== Eutyches and Chalcedon ==
In response to Eutychianism, the Council adopted dyophysitism, which clearly distinguished between person and nature, by stating that Christ is one person in two natures but emphasized that the natures are "without confusion, without change, without division, without separation".

Miaphysites rejected that definition as verging on Nestorianism and instead adhered to the wording of Cyril of Alexandria, the chief opponent of Nestorianism, who had spoken of the "one (mia) nature of the Word of God incarnate" (μία φύσις τοῦ θεοῦ λόγου σεσαρκωμένη mia physis tou theou logou sesarkōmenē). The distinction of the stance was that the incarnate Christ has one nature, but it is still of both a divine character and a human character and retains all the characteristics of both, with no mingling, confusion or change of either nature. Miaphysites condemned Eutychianism.
