= List of 5th-century religious leaders =

This is a list of the top-level leaders for religious groups with at least 50,000 adherents, and that led anytime from January 1, 401, to December 31, 500. It should likewise only name leaders listed on other articles and lists.

== Christianity ==
=== Chalcedonian Christianity ===
- Church of Rome (complete list) –

- Anastasius I, Pope (399–401)
- Innocent I, Pope (401–417)
- Zosimus, Pope (417–418)
- Boniface I, Pope (418–422)
- Celestine I, Pope (422–432)
- Sixtus III, Pope (432–440)
- Leo I the Great, Pope (440–461)
- Hilarius, Pope (461–468)
- Simplicius, Pope (468–483)
- Felix III, Pope (483–492)
- Gelasius I, Pope (492–496)
- Anastasius II, Pope (496–498)
- Symmachus, Pope (498–514)

- Church of Constantinople (complete list) –

- John Chrysostom, Archbishop (398–404)
- Arsacius of Tarsus, Archbishop (404–405)
- Atticus, Archbishop (406–425)
- Sisinnius I, Archbishop (426–427)
- Nestorius, Archbishop (428–431)
- Maximianus, Archbishop (431–434)
- Proclus, Archbishop (434–446)
- Flavian, Archbishop (446–449)
- Anatolius –

- Archbishop of Constantinople (449–451)
- Patriarch of Constantinople (451–458)

- Gennadius I, Patriarch of Constantinople (458–471)
- Acacius, Patriarch of Constantinople (471–488)
- Fravitas, Patriarch of Constantinople (488–489)
- Euphemius, Patriarch of Constantinople (489–495)
- Macedonius II, Patriarch of Constantinople (495–511)

- Church of Alexandria (complete list) –

- Theophilus I, Patriarch of Alexandria (385–412)
- Cyril I, Patriarch of Alexandria (412–444)

As recognized by Chalcedonian Christianity
- Dioscorus I, Patriarch of Alexandria (444–451; deposed by Chalcedon)
- Proterius, Patriarch of Alexandria (451–457)
- Timothy II Aelurus, Patriarch of Alexandria (457–460, 475–477)
- Timothy III Salophakiolos, Patriarch of Alexandria (460–475, 477–481)
- Timothy II Aelurus, Patriarch of Alexandria (457–460, 475–477)
- Peter III Mongus, Patriarch of Alexandria (477, 482–490)
- Timothy III Salophakiolos, Patriarch of Alexandria (460–475, 477–481)
- John I Talaias, Patriarch of Alexandria (481–482)
- Peter III Mongus, Patriarch of Alexandria (477, 482–490)

As recognized by Coptic Christianity
- Dioscorus I, Pope & Patriarch (444–454)
- Timothy II Aelurus, Pope & Patriarch (454–477)
- Peter III Mongus, Pope & Patriarch (477–490)

- Athanasius II Kelitis, Patriarch of Alexandria (490–496)
- John II the Monk, Patriarch of Alexandria (496–505)

- Church of Antioch (complete list) –

- Flavian I, Patriarch of Antioch (399–404)
- Porphyrus, Patriarch of Antioch (404–412)
- Alexander, Patriarch of Antioch (412–417)
- Theodotus, Patriarch of Antioch (417–428)
- John I, Patriarch of Antioch (428–442)
- Domnus II, Patriarch of Antioch (442–449) – deposed at Ephesus II
- Maximus, Patriarch of Antioch (449–455)
- Basil of Antioch, Patriarch of Antioch (456–458)
- Acacius of Antioch, Patriarch of Antioch (458–461)
- Martyrius, Patriarch of Antioch (461–469)

- Peter the Fuller (469/470–471), Non-Chalcedonian supported by Zeno

- Julian, Patriarch of Antioch (471–476)

- Peter the Fuller (476), Non-Chalcedonian supported by Basiliscus
- John II Codonatus (476–477), Non-Chalcedonian

- Stephanus II, Patriarch of Antioch (477–479)
- Calendion, Patriarch of Antioch (479–485)

- Peter the Fuller (485–488), Non-Chalcedonian supported by Zeno

- Palladius, Patriarch of Antioch (488–498)
- Flavian II, Patriarch of Antioch (498–512)

- Church of Jerusalem –

- Juvenal –

- Bishop of Jerusalem (422–451)
- Patriarch of Jerusalem (451–458)

- Anastasius I, Patriarch of Jerusalem (458–478)
- Martyrius, Patriarch of Jerusalem (478–486)
- Sallustius, Patriarch of Jerusalem (486–494)
- Elias I, Patriarch of Jerusalem (494–516)

== Judaism ==
=== Rabbinic Judaism ===
- Nasi of the Sanhedrin

- Raban Gamaliel VI, Nasi (c.400–425)

- Babylon

- Ravina I, prominent Talmudist and Rabbi (?–420)
- Rav Ashi, prominent Talmudist and Rabbi (352–427)
- Mar bar Rav Ashi, prominent Talmudist and Rabbi (c.430–c.465)
- Ravina II, prominent Talmudist and Rabbi (?–474/499)
- Rav Rahumi III, prominent Talmudist and Rabbi (c.465–c.500)

== See also ==
- Religious leaders by year
- List of state leaders in the 5th century
- Lists of colonial governors by century
