= 480s =

Decade

The 480s decade ran from January 1, 480, to December 31, 489.

== Events ==
=== By place ===
==== Byzantine Empire ====
- Emperor Zeno officially dissolves the east/west co-emperorship, ruling as the first sole emperor of Rome in 85 years. The position of emperor is never again divided.

==== Balkans ====
- Julius Nepos, former emperor of the Western Roman Empire, dies in exile in Dalmatia (he is murdered by his own soldiers, in his villa, near Salona).
- December 9 – Odoacer occupies Dalmatia and prosecutes Nepos's killers. He later establishes his political power with the co-operation of the Roman Senate.

==== Europe ====
- King Chilperic I dies and is succeeded by his nephew Gundobad, whose realm covers much of eastern Gaul and has two capitals, at Lyon and Geneva. He rules the Kingdom of Burgundy with his brothers Chilperic II, Gundomar and Godegisel.
- Syagrius, ruler of Domain of Soissons, manages to maintain the Roman authority in northern Gaul. He defends his "kingdom" against the neighbouring Salian Franks.
- The Visigoths under King Euric extend their rule from the Loire to Gibraltar (approximate date).
- Ireland: The Diocese of Connor is erected.

==== Asia ====
- Budhagupta, ruler of the Gupta Empire, establishes diplomatic relations with the Kannauj Kingdom and drives the Huns out of the fertile plains of northern India.
- Prince Seinei succeeds his father Yūryaku and becomes the 22nd emperor of Japan.

=== By topic ===
==== Religion ====
- Constantius of Lyon begins his research for his book Vita sancta Germani ("on the Life of Germanus"). He also writes a hagiography of Germanus of Auxerre (approximate date).

=== By place ===
==== Europe ====
- King Childeric I dies at Tournai after a 24-year reign. He is succeeded by his 15-year-old son Clovis, who becomes ruler of the Salian Franks in the province Gallia Belgica (modern Belgium) until his death in 511.
- Theodoric Strabo defeats the Bulgars in Thrace, and moves with an army (13,000 men) towards Constantinople. After logistical problems, he is forced to return to Greece. In an encampment at Stabulum Diomedis, near Philippi, he falls from an unruly horse onto a spear and dies.

==== Persia ====
- The Armenians revolt against Persian rule, in an uprising that continues until 484. Led by Vahan Mamikonian, nephew of the late Vartan, they obtain religious and political freedom in return for military aid. Vahan is installed as governor (marzban).

==== Asia ====
- Jangsu of Goguryeo invades Silla with the Mohe. Baekje and Gaya come to Silla's aid and defeats the Goguryeo troops.

=== By place ===
==== Byzantine Empire ====
- Emperor Zeno promulgates an Edict of Union (Henotikon), in an unsuccessful effort to soften the decision made at the Council of Chalcedon (451), and resolve differences between the Eastern and Western Churches. Zeno wishes to placate the Monophysite churches of Egypt, Palestine and Syria for political reasons.

==== Eastern Europe ====
- Legendary founding of Kyiv, on the banks of the Dnieper River.

==== China ====
- Prince Qi Wudi succeeds his father Qi Gaodi, and becomes emperor of Southern Qi.

=== By place ===
==== Byzantine Empire ====
- Byzantine general Illus (magister officiorum), and Verina (widow of the late emperor Leo I), attempt to overthrow Emperor Zeno and place another general named Leontius on the throne.

==== Europe ====
- The Ostrogoths are given status as foederati; they control a large part of Macedonia and Thrace (Balkans).

=== By topic ===
==== Religion ====
- March 10 – Pope Simplicius dies at Rome after a 15-year reign, and is succeeded by Felix III as the 48th pope; Rome is without a pope for 10 days in the interim. Felix III is a widower with two children.

=== By place ===
==== Byzantine Empire ====
- July 19 – Leontius, Roman usurper, is crowned emperor at Tarsus (modern Turkey). Empress dowager Verina sends a letter to the governors of the Diocese of the East and the Diocese of Egypt for support. He is recognized in Antioch and makes it his capital.
- Leontius raises a rebellion against emperor Zeno, who also faces a revolt from the Ostrogoth king Theodoric the Great. He sends an army to Syria, but is defeated by the Byzantine general Illus.
- Zeno signs a peace treaty with Theodoric the Great. He appoints him to magister militum and becomes a consul. The Eastern Empire is saved by diplomatic negotiations, and the imperial army is strengthened behind the walls of Constantinople.

==== Europe ====
- King Gundobad proclaims the Lex Burgundionum, a law code of the Burgundians concerning marriage and inheritance, as well as regulating weregild and other penalties (approximate date).
- December 28 – The Visigoth king Euric dies and is succeeded by his son Alaric II. Euric has built a rampart to protect the city of Carcassonne southeast of Toulouse, on a bend of the Aude River.

==== Africa ====
- February 24 – King Huneric passes the Edict of 484, a law banning Catholicism within the Vandal Kingdom. A few weeks later, King Huneric removes Catholic bishops from their offices and banishes some to Corsica. A few are martyred, including former proconsul Victorian along with Frumentius and other merchants. They are killed at Hadrumetum after refusing to become Arians.
- December 23 – Huneric dies and is succeeded by his nephew Gunthamund, who becomes king of the Vandals. During his reign the Catholics are free from persecutions and he stabilises the kingdom's economy.

==== Asia ====
- The Hephthalites (White Huns) invade Persia. King Peroz I gathers an army of 50,000-100,000 men, and places his brother Balash at the head of the government in Ctesiphon. At the Battle of Herat, the Persians are ambushed and defeated. Peroz I is killed, whose body is not found. Balash is crowned and becomes king of Persia.
- The Nvarsak Treaty is concluded between the Persians and Armenians.

=== By topic ===
==== Religion ====
- Pope Felix III excommunicates Acacius of Constantinople and Peter III of Alexandria, for their role in having Zeno issue his Edict of Union (Henotikon) 2 years ago. He considers the edict to be heretical and the schism between the Church of Rome and the Church of Constantinople widens. The Acacian Schism will not be resolved until 519.

=== By place ===
==== Britannia ====
- Aelle of Sussex, king of the South Saxons, fights the Britons at the stream of Mercredesburne. The battle ends in a draw (according to the Anglo-Saxon Chronicle).
- Period of Arthur's "twelve battles", during which he gains reputation for invincibility (approximate date).

==== Asia ====
- Emperor Xiaowen institutes an "equal-field" system of agriculture (juntian), assigning each peasant family about 19 acres (140 mu) of land. The land will be part minority divided by the farmer to be kept indefinitely and rest will revert to the state if the farmer dies or retires. The population is then divided by each other with the role of supervising one another. The result of this reform is that farmers mostly did not sell their holdings to large landowners. This provided the fiscal basis for the formation of the Sui and Tang dynasties.
- Fearing of a war with the Southern Qi, Jiaozhou governor Lý Thúc Hiến surrendered, officially marking the end of nearly 20 years of Lý clan rule in the region.
- Prince Kenzō succeeds his adoptive father Seinei, and becomes the 23rd emperor of Japan.

=== By topic ===
==== Religion ====
- Peter the Fuller, patriarch of Antioch, is condemned and excommunicated by a synod of Western bishops at Rome.

=== By place ===
==== Europe ====
- Franco-Roman War of 486 – Battle of Soissons (Gaul): Frankish forces under King Clovis I defeat the Roman army of Syagrius. Roman rule under Syagrius ends. The land between the Somme and the Loire becomes a part of the Frankish Empire. Syagrius flees to the Visigoths (under King Alaric II), but Clovis threatens war, and he is handed over for execution.
- Clovis I establishes his new residence at Soissons. He appoints Ragnachar, Frankish petty king (regulus), as his deputy ruler.

=== By topic ===
==== Religion ====
- Persian Christians who follow Nestorianism gather in the second Council of Seleucia (modern Turkey).

=== By place ===
==== Europe ====
- King Odoacer leads an army to victory against the Rugians in Noricum (modern Austria).

==== Asia ====
- Emperor Kenzō of Japan, age 38, dies after a reign of only three years.

==== Central America ====
- July 28 – Bʼutz Aj Sak Chiik becomes the new ruler of the Mayan city-state of Palenque, in what is now the state of Chiapas in southern Mexico, and reigns until his death in 501.

=== By topic ===
==== Religion ====
- The Lateran Council, convened by Pope Felix III, establishes conditions for readmitting to the Church those Christians who have been rebaptized by the Vandals.

=== By place ===
==== Byzantine Empire ====
- Emperor Zeno regains power from the usurper Leontius and the Isaurian patrician Illus, who are captured and executed, ending a 4-year rebellion (see 484).
- Zeno orders Theodoric the Great to overthrow his rival Odoacer, who has established himself as king of Italy (see 476). He marches with an Ostrogoth army to the West.

==== Europe ====
- According to the Anglo-Saxon Chronicle, Hengist dies and is succeeded by his son Oisc as king of Kent.
- Among the peoples who live on the south bank of the Danube in Noricum ripense and who are de facto ruled by the Rugii, whose empire has its centre near Krems on the north bank, are Romii who had been evacuated earlier from Danube settlements above the River Enns. They include members of the Severin convent. Because some of the Rugii want to fight for East Rome against Odoacer, they destroy the Rugian Empire and allow the Romii to be evacuated to Italy by his brother, Hunulf, in order to prevent the re-establishment of the Rugian Empire by a surviving prince. The northern Danubian Limes of the Roman Empire are effectively abandoned. Even the relics of Severinus of Noricum are carried with them.
- The Gepids capture Belgrade.

==== Persia ====
- Kavadh I is crowned by the nobles, and succeeds his blind uncle Balash as the 19th king of Persia.

==== Asia ====
- Ninken, adopted heir of Seinei, succeeds his brother Kenzō and becomes new emperor of Japan.

=== By topic ===
==== Religion ====
- Peter the Fuller is succeeded by Palladius as patriarch of Antioch.
- Fravitta becomes patriarch of Constantinople.

=== By place ===
==== Byzantine Empire ====
- Emperor Zeno closes the School of Edessa (modern Turkey) for their teaching of Nestorian doctrine, whereupon the scholars seek refuge at the Syriac Church of the East.

==== Europe ====
- August – Battle of Sirmium in Pannonia: The Ostrogoths under Theodoric the Great, moving to invade Northern Italy at the behest of Eastern Roman Emperor Zeno, defeat the Gepids attempting to stop their advance.
- August 28 – After crossing the Julian Alps, the Ostrogoths defeat the overwhelming forces of Odoacer at the Battle of Isonzo (near Roman Aquileia or modern Soča) and enter Italy. This date is subsequently used by Theodoric to establish a 30-year statute of limitations (tricennium) ending on 28 August 519, after which any unlawful seizure of land during this period can no longer be contested.
- September 30 – Battle of Verona: Odoacer is defeated again by Theodoric for a second time. He retreats to the impregnable capital of Ravenna.
- The Ostrogoths capture the cities Pavia and Milan. The majority of Odoacer's army, including his magister militum Tufa, surrenders to Theodoric.

=== By topic ===
==== Religion ====
- The first Temple of Confucius is constructed in Northern China (outside the ancestral temple at Qufu).

== Significant people ==
- Dongseong, King of Baekje (479–501)
- Gundobad, King of Burgundy (473–516)
- Zeno, Emperor of the Byzantine Empire (476–491)
- Acacius of Constantinople, Patriarch of Constantinople (471-488)
- Fravitta of Constantinople, Patriarch of Constantinople (488-489)
- Euphemius, Patriarch of Constantinople 489–495
- Emperor Xiaowen, Emperor of Northern Wei (471–499)
- Emperor Gao of Southern Qi, Emperor of Qi (479–482)
- Emperor Wu, Emperor of Qi (482–493)
- Loarn, King of Dál Riata (474–500)
- Erbin of Dumnonia, King of Dumnonia (443-480)
- Gerren Llyngesic ab Erbin, King of Dumnonia (c. 480–514)
- Jangsu, King of Goguryeo (413–490)
- Buddha Gupta, Gupta Emperor (477–496)
- Einion Yrth ap Cunedda, King of Gwynedd (c. 470–500)
- Khingila I, Tegin of Hephthalite Empire (AKA White Huns) (c. 440-490)
- Ernakh, Ruler of the Huns (469–503)
- Vakhtang I, King of Iberia (447–522)
- Lughaid mac Loeguire, High King of Ireland (479–503)
- Odoacer, King of Italy (476–493)
- Pope Simplicius, Pope of the Roman Catholic Church, p. 468–483
- Felix II (excluding Antipope Felix II), Pope of the Roman Catholic Church, p. 483–492
- Emperor Seinei, Emperor of Japan (c. 480-c. 484)
- Emperor Kenzō, Emperor of Japan (c. 485-c. 487)
- Emperor Ninken, Emperor of Japan (c. 488-c. 498)
- Hengist and Horsa, Co-Kings of Kent (455-488)
- Oisc, King of Kent (488-512)
- "Casper", Ajaw of Palenque (435–487)
- B'utz Aj Sak Chiik, Ajaw of Palenque (487–501)
- Skanda Varman IV, King of Pallava (460–480)
- Nandi Varman I, King of Pallava (480–500)
- Peroz I, Sassanid King (459–484)
- Balash, Sassanid King (484–488)
- Kavadh I, Sassanid dynasty King of Persia (488–496, 498–531)
- Rhuddfedel Frych, King of Powys (c. 480–500)
- Yujiulü Yucheng, Khan of the Rouran Khaganate (450-485)
- Yujiulü Doulun, Khan of the Rouran Khaganate (485-492)
- Childeric I, King of Salian Franks (457–481)
- Clovis I, King of Salian Franks (481–509)
- Soji, King of Silla (479–500)
- Aelle, King of the South Saxons (c. 477–c. 514) and first Bretwalda of the Anglo-Saxon Heptarchy (488-514)
- Huneric, King of the Vandals and Alans (477–484)
- Gunthamund, King of the Vandals and Alans (484–496)
- Euric, King of the Visigothic Kingdom (466–484)
- Alaric II, King of the Visigothic Kingdom (484–507)

== Births ==
480

- Baderic, king of the Thuringi (approximate date)
- Benedict of Nursia, monasticist (approximate date)
- Boethius, Roman philosopher and writer (d. 524)
- Dignāga, Buddhist founder of Indian logic (d. 540)
- Eutharic, Visigothic prince (approximate date)
- Gelimer, king of the Vandals and Alans (d. 553)
- Scholastica, Christian nun (approximate date)
- Xiao Zhaowen, emperor of Southern Qi (d. 494)
- Zu Gengzhi, Chinese mathematician (d. 525)

482

- Justinian I, emperor of the Byzantine Empire (d. 565)

483

- Xiao Baojuan, emperor of Southern Qi (d. 501)
- Xuan Wu Di, emperor of Northern Wei (d. 515)
- Yuan Xun, crown prince of Northern Wei (d. 497)
- Zhu Yi, high official of Southern Liang (d. 549)

484

- Antonina, Byzantine patrikia and wife of Belisarius (approximate date)
- Brendan, Irish abbot and saint (approximate date)

485

- Cassiodorus, Roman statesman and writer (approximate date)
- Samson of Dol, bishop and saint (approximate date)

487

- Sacerdos of Lyon, French archbishop (d. 551)
- Theuderic I, king of the Franks (approximate date) (d. 534)
- Xiao Baoyin, prince of Southern Qi (d. 530)

488

- He Di, emperor of Southern Qi (d. 502)
- Senán mac Geirrcinn, Irish saint
- Yu, empress of Northern Wei (d. 507)

== Deaths ==
480

- Chilperic I, king of Burgundy
- Conall Cremthainne, king of Uisneach (Ireland)
- Erbin of Dumnonia, Brythonic king (approximate date)
- Julius Nepos, Western Roman Emperor
- Nechtan I, king of the Picts
- Tydfil, female saint (approximate date)

481

- Childeric I, king of the Salian Franks (or 482)
- Sabinianus Magnus, Roman general
- Theodoric Strabo, Ostrogothic chieftain
- Timothy III, patriarch of Alexandria

482

- January 8 – Severinus of Noricum, monk and saint
- Ailill Molt, High King of Ireland (approximate date)
- Qi Gaodi, Chinese emperor of Southern Qi (b. 427)

483

- March 10 – Pope Simplicius
- Crimthann mac Énnai, king of Leinster (Ireland)

484

- December 23 – Huneric, king of the Vandals
- Euric, king of the Visigoths
- Peroz I, king of the Persian Empire
- Seinei, emperor of Japan
- Verina, wife of former emperor Leo I

485

- April 17 – Proclus, Greek Neoplatonist philosopher (b. 412)
- Asclepigenia, Athenian philosopher and mystic (b. 430)
- Fincath mac Garrchu, king of Leinster

486

- Syagrius, Roman official in Gaul (approximate date)

487

- Gao Yun, duke of Northern Wei (b. 390)
- Kenzō, emperor of Japan (approximate date)
- Syagrius, "king of the Romans" (approximate date)

488

- Balash, king of the Persian Empire
- Hengest, leader of Kent
- Illus, Byzantine general
- Leontius, Byzantine usurper
- Peter the Fuller, patriarch of Antioch

489

- Acacius, patriarch of Constantinople
- Modest, bishop of Trier
- Sidonius Apollinaris, bishop and diplomat
- Wang Jian, official of Liu Song and Southern Qi (b. 452)
