= Patriarch John =

Patriarch John may refer to:

- John Talaia (Patriarch John I), Patriarch of Alexandria in 481–482
- Pope John I of Alexandria, Patriarch of Alexandria in 496–505
- Pope John II (III) of Alexandria, Patriarch of Alexandria in 505–516
- Patriarch John IV of Alexandria, Greek Patriarch of Alexandria in 569–579
- Patriarch John V of Alexandria, Greek Patriarch of Alexandria in 610–619
- Patriarch John VI of Alexandria, Greek Patriarch of Alexandria in 1062–1100
- Patriarch John I of Antioch, ruled in 428–442
- Patriarch John IV of Antioch, ruled in 846–873
- John the Oxite, Greek Orthodox Patriarch of Antioch (as John IV or V) in 1089–1100
- Patriarch John X of Antioch, ruled since 2012
- John Chrysostom, Patriarch John I of Constantinople, Archbishop in 398–404
- John of Cappadocia, Patriarch John II of Constantinople, Ecumenical Patriarch in 518–520
- John Scholasticus, Patriarch John III of Constantinople, Ecumenical Patriarch in 565–577
- Patriarch John IV of Constantinople, Ecumenical Patriarch in 582–595
- Patriarch John V of Constantinople, Ecumenical Patriarch in 669–675
- Patriarch John VI of Constantinople, Ecumenical Patriarch in 712–715
- Patriarch John VII of Constantinople, Ecumenical Patriarch in 837–843
- Patriarch John VIII of Constantinople, Ecumenical Patriarch in 1064–1075
- Patriarch John IX of Constantinople, Ecumenical Patriarch in 1111–1134
- Patriarch John X of Constantinople, Ecumenical Patriarch in 1198–1206
- Patriarch John XI of Constantinople, Ecumenical Patriarch in 1275–1282
- Patriarch John XII of Constantinople, Ecumenical Patriarch in 1294–1303
- Patriarch John XIII of Constantinople, Ecumenical Patriarch in 1315–1320
- Patriarch John XIV of Constantinople, Ecumenical Patriarch in 1334–1347

== See also ==
- Patriarch John I (disambiguation)
- Patriarch John II (disambiguation)
- Patriarch John III (disambiguation)
- Patriarch John of Alexandria (disambiguation)
- Patriarch John of Constantinople (disambiguation)
- Pope John (disambiguation)
- John (name)
