= July 28 =

July 28 this year in various calendars
- Tuesday, 28 July 2026
Akan	Fobene
Armenian	8 Nawasardi 1476
Aztec	Quecholli 19, 5 Mazātl
Babylonian	13 Du'uzu, 2337 SE
Balinese pawukon	Menga, Pasah, Sri, Umanis, Tungleh, Anggara of Krulut, Sri, Nohan, Dewa
Bengali	13 Shrabon, BS 1433
Chinese	Yin Water Rabbit・Tail Mansion; Fire Horse Year, Month 6, Day 15 (Dashu, 10 days until Liqiu)
Common Era	28 July 2026 CE
Coptic	21 Epip, AM 1742
Egyptian	13 Choiak, 2775 NE
Ethiopian	21 Ḥamlē, 2018 Amätä Məhrät
French Republican	Décade I, Décadi de Thermidor de l'Année 234 de la République
Gregorian	28 July, AD 2026
Hebrew	14 Av, AM 5786
Hindu	Pūrvāṣāḍha・Vaidhṛti; Solar: 12 Śrāvaṇa, 1948 SE; Lunisolar: Caturdaśī, Śukla pakṣa of Āṣāḍha, 2083 VE; Rāudra・5127 KY・1,872,784
Icelandic	Þriðjudagur, 3 Heyannir 2026
Islamic	12 Safar, AH 1448 (using tabular method)
ISO week date	2026-W31-2
Japanese	15 Minazuki, Reiwa 8 (Taisho, 10 days until Risshū)
Julian	15 July, AD 2026 (AM 7534)
Julian day	2461250
Korean	15 Yangdal, 4359 DE
Maya	13.0.13.14.7; 0 Yaxkin, 5 Manik
Roman	Idibus Iuliis, MMDCCLXXIX AUC
Solar Hijri	6 Mordad, SH 1405
Tibetan	14 chu stod, me pho rta 2153 or 1772 or 1000

<<	July					>>
Su	Mo	Tu	We	Th	Fr	Sa
			1	2	3	4
5	6	7	8	9	10	11
12	13	14	15	16	17	18
19	20	21	22	23	24	25
26	27	28	29	30	31
2026

July 28 in recent years
2026 (Tuesday)
2025 (Monday)
2024 (Sunday)
2023 (Friday)
2022 (Thursday)
2021 (Wednesday)
2020 (Tuesday)
2019 (Sunday)
2018 (Saturday)
2017 (Friday)

July 28 is the 209th day of the year (210th in leap years) in the Gregorian calendar; 156 days remain until the end of the year.

== Events ==
=== Pre-1600 ===
- 484 – Pope Felix III excommunicated patriarch Acacius of Constantinople for his support of the Henoticon and his support of the removal of patriarch John Talaia, leading to the Acacian schism.
- 1364 – Troops of the Republic of Pisa and the Republic of Florence clash in the Battle of Cascina.
- 1402 – Ottoman-Timurid Wars: Battle of Ankara: Timur, ruler of Timurid Empire, defeats forces of the Ottoman Empire sultan Bayezid I.
- 1540 – Henry VIII of England marries his fifth wife, Catherine Howard.
- 1540 – Thomas Cromwell is executed after having been condemned untried, using a bill of attainder which Cromwell had used against his opponents.
- 1571 – La Laguna encomienda, known today as the Laguna province in the Philippines, is founded by the Spaniards as one of the oldest encomiendas (provinces) in the country.

=== 1601–1900 ===
- 1635 – Eighty Years' War: The Spanish capture the strategic Dutch fortress of Schenkenschans.
- 1656 – Second Northern War: Battle of Warsaw begins.
- 1778 – Constitution of the province of Cantabria ratified at the Assembly Hall in Bárcena la Puente, Reocín, Spain.
- 1794 – French Revolution: Maximilien Robespierre and Louis Antoine de Saint-Just are executed by guillotine in Paris, France.
- 1808 – Mahmud II became Sultan of the Ottoman Empire and Caliph of Islam.
- 1809 – Peninsular War: Sir Arthur Wellesley's British, Portuguese and Spanish army repulse a French force led by Joseph Bonaparte in the Battle of Talavera.
- 1821 – José de San Martín declares the independence of Peru from Spain.
- 1854 – USS Constellation (1854), the last all-sail warship built by the United States Navy and current museum ship in Baltimore Harbor, is commissioned.
- 1864 – American Civil War: In the Battle of Ezra Church, Confederate troops make a third unsuccessful attempt under General John Bell Hood to prevent Union forces led by General William T. Sherman from approaching Atlanta, Georgia.
- 1866 – At the age of 18, Vinnie Ream becomes the first and youngest female artist to receive a commission from the United States government for a statue (of Abraham Lincoln).
- 1868 – The 14th Amendment to the United States Constitution is certified, establishing African American citizenship and guaranteeing due process of law.
- 1883 – A moderate earthquake measuring magnitude 4.3–5.2 strikes the Italian island of Ischia, killing over 2,300 people.
- 1896 – The city of Miami is incorporated.

=== 1901–present ===
- 1911 – The Australasian Antarctic Expedition began as the SY Aurora departed London.
- 1914 – World War I: In the culmination of the July Crisis, Austria-Hungary declares war on the Kingdom of Serbia and begins the Great War.
- 1915 – The United States begins a 19-year occupation of Haiti.
- 1917 – Anti-lynching movement: The Silent Parade takes place in New York City, in protest against murders, lynchings, and other violence directed towards African Americans.
- 1932 – During the Great Depression, U.S. president Herbert Hoover orders the United States Army to forcibly evict the "Bonus Army" of World War I veterans gathered in Washington, D.C.
- 1935 – First flight of the Boeing B-17 Flying Fortress.
- 1938 – Hawaii Clipper disappears between Guam and Manila as the first loss of an airliner in trans-Pacific China Clipper service.
- 1939 – The Sutton Hoo helmet is discovered.
- 1942 – World War II: Soviet leader Joseph Stalin issues Order No. 227. In response to alarming German advances, all those who retreat or otherwise leave their positions without orders to do so are to be tried in a military court, with punishment ranging from duty in a shtrafbat battalion, imprisonment in a Gulag, or execution.
- 1943 – World War II: Operation Gomorrah: The Royal Air Force bombs Hamburg, Germany causing a firestorm that kills 42,000 German civilians.
- 1945 – A U.S. Army B-25 bomber crashes into the 79th floor of the Empire State Building killing 14 and injuring 26.
- 1957 – Heavy rain and a mudslide in Isahaya, western Kyushu, Japan, kills 992.
- 1960 – The German Volkswagen Act comes into force.
- 1962 – Beginning of the 8th World Festival of Youth and Students.
- 1965 – Vietnam War: U.S. president Lyndon B. Johnson announces his order to increase the number of United States troops in South Vietnam from 75,000 to 125,000.
- 1973 – Summer Jam at Watkins Glen: Nearly 600,000 people attend a rock festival at the Watkins Glen International Raceway.
- 1974 – Spetsgruppa A, Russia's elite special force, was formed.
- 1976 – The Tangshan earthquake measuring between 7.8 and 8.2 moment magnitude flattens Tangshan in the People's Republic of China, killing 242,769 and injuring 164,851.
- 1984 – Olympic Games: Games of the XXIII Olympiad: The summer Olympics were opened in Los Angeles.
- 1996 – The remains of a prehistoric man are discovered near Kennewick, Washington. Such remains will be known as the Kennewick Man.
- 2001 – Australian Ian Thorpe becomes the first swimmer to win six gold medals at a single World Championship meeting.
- 2002 – Nine coal miners trapped in the flooded Quecreek Mine in Somerset County, Pennsylvania, are rescued after 77 hours underground.
- 2002 – Pulkovo Aviation Enterprise Flight 9560 crashes after takeoff from Sheremetyevo International Airport in Moscow, Russia, killing 14 of the 16 people on board.
- 2005 – The Provisional Irish Republican Army calls an end to its thirty-year-long armed campaign against British rule in Northern Ireland.
- 2010 – Airblue Flight 202 crashes into the Margalla Hills north of Islamabad, Pakistan, killing all 152 people aboard. It is the deadliest aviation accident in Pakistan history and the first involving an Airbus A321.
- 2011 – While flying from Seoul, South Korea to Shanghai, China, Asiana Airlines Flight 991 develops an in-flight fire in the cargo hold. The Boeing 747-400F freighter attempts to divert to Jeju International Airport, but crashes into the sea South-West of Jeju island, killing both crew members on board.
- 2017 – Nawaz Sharif was disqualified from office for life by Supreme Court of Pakistan after finding him guilty of corruption charges.
- 2018 – Australian Wendy Tuck becomes the first female skipper to win the Clipper Round the World Yacht Race.
- 2022 – Catastrophic floods devastate Eastern Kentucky, resulting in 45 fatalities and causing damage to thousands of homes and businesses.

== Births ==
=== Pre-1600 ===
- 1347 – Margaret of Durazzo, Queen of Naples and Hungary (died 1412)
- 1458 – Jacopo Sannazaro, Italian poet, humanist and epigrammist (died 1530)
- 1516 – William, Duke of Jülich-Cleves-Berg, German nobleman (died 1592)

=== 1601–1900 ===
- 1609 – Judith Leyster, Dutch painter (died 1660)
- 1645 – Marguerite Louise d'Orléans, French princess (died 1721)
- 1659 – Charles Ancillon, French jurist and diplomat (died 1715)
- 1746 – Thomas Heyward Jr., American judge and politician (died 1809)
- 1750 – Fabre d'Églantine, French actor, playwright, and politician (died 1794)
- 1783 – Friedrich Wilhelm von Bismarck, German army officer and writer (died 1860)
- 1796 – Ignaz Bösendorfer, Austrian businessman, founded the Bösendorfer Company (died 1859)
- 1804 – Ludwig Feuerbach, German anthropologist and philosopher (died 1872)
- 1815 – Stefan Dunjov, Bulgarian colonel (died 1889)
- 1844 – Gerard Manley Hopkins, English poet (died 1889)
- 1849 – James Edson White, American author and publisher, second son of Ellen G. White and James S. White
- 1857 – Ballington Booth, English-American activist, co-founded Volunteers of America (died 1940)
- 1860 – Elias M. Ammons, American businessman and politician, 19th Governor of Colorado (died 1925)
- 1860 – Grand Duchess Anastasia Mikhailovna of Russia (died 1922)
- 1863 – Huseyn Khan Nakhchivanski, Russian general (died 1919)
- 1866 – Beatrix Potter, English children's book writer and illustrator (died 1943)
- 1866 – Albertson Van Zo Post, American fencer (died 1938)
- 1867 – Charles Dillon Perrine, American-Argentinian astronomer (died 1951)
- 1872 – Albert Sarraut, French journalist and politician, 106th Prime Minister of France (died 1962)
- 1874 – Ernst Cassirer, Polish-American philosopher and academic (died 1945)
- 1879 – Lucy Burns, American activist, co-founded the National Woman's Party (died 1966)
- 1879 – Stefan Filipkiewicz, Polish painter (died 1944)
- 1887 – Marcel Duchamp, French-American painter and sculptor (died 1968)
- 1887 – Willard Price, Canadian-American journalist and author (died 1983)
- 1893 – Rued Langgaard, Danish organist and composer (died 1952)
- 1893 – Bullet Rogan, American baseball player (died 1967)
- 1896 – Barbara La Marr, American actress and screenwriter (died 1926)
- 1898 – Lawrence Gray, American actor (died 1970)

=== 1901–present ===
- 1901 – Freddie Fitzsimmons, American baseball player, coach, and manager (died 1979)
- 1901 – Rudy Vallée, American actor, singer, and saxophonist (died 1986)
- 1902 – Albert Namatjira, Australian painter (died 1959)
- 1902 – Karl Popper, Austrian-English philosopher and academic (died 1994)
- 1907 – Earl Tupper, American inventor and businessman, founded Tupperware Brands (died 1983)
- 1909 – Aenne Burda, German publisher (died 2005)
- 1909 – Malcolm Lowry, English novelist and poet (died 1957)
- 1914 – Carmen Dragon, American conductor and composer (died 1984)
- 1915 – Charles H. Townes, American physicist and academic, Nobel Prize laureate (died 2015)
- 1915 – Dick Sprang, American illustrator (died 2000)
- 1915 – Frankie Yankovic, American polka musician (died 1998)
- 1916 – David Brown, American journalist and producer (died 2010)
- 1920 – Andrew V. McLaglen, English-American director and producer (died 2014)
- 1922 – Jacques Piccard, Belgian-Swiss oceanographer and engineer (died 2008)
- 1923 – Ray Ellis, American conductor and producer (died 2008)
- 1924 – Luigi Musso, Italian racing driver (died 1958)
- 1925 – Baruch Samuel Blumberg, American physician and academic, Nobel Prize laureate (died 2011)
- 1926 – Charlie Biddle, American-Canadian bassist (died 2003)
- 1927 – John Ashbery, American poet (died 2017)
- 1929 – Jacqueline Kennedy Onassis, American journalist and socialite, 37th First Lady of the United States (died 1994)
- 1930 – Firoza Begum, Bangladeshi singer (died 2014)
- 1930 – Junior Kimbrough, American singer and guitarist (died 1998)
- 1930 – Jean Roba, Belgian author and illustrator (died 2006)
- 1930 – Ramsey Muir Withers, Canadian general (died 2014)
- 1931 – Alan Brownjohn, English poet and author (died 2024)
- 1931 – Darryl Hickman, American actor (died 2024)
- 1931 – Johnny Martin, Australian cricketer (died 1992)
- 1932 – Natalie Babbitt, American author and illustrator (died 2016)
- 1932 – Carlos Alberto Brilhante Ustra, Brazilian colonel (died 2015)
- 1933 – Charlie Hodge, Canadian ice hockey player and scout (died 2016)
- 1934 – Jacques d'Amboise, American dancer and choreographer (died 2021)
- 1935 – Neil McKendrick, English historian and academic
- 1936 – Russ Jackson, Canadian football player and coach
- 1936 – Garfield Sobers, Barbadian cricketer (died 2026)
- 1937 – Peter Duchin, American pianist and bandleader
- 1937 – Francis Veber, French director and screenwriter
- 1938 – Luis Aragonés, Spanish footballer, coach, and manager (died 2014)
- 1938 – Arsen Dedić, Croatian singer-songwriter and poet (died 2015)
- 1938 – Alberto Fujimori, Peruvian engineer, academic, and politician, President of Peru (died 2024)
- 1938 – Chuan Leekpai, Thai lawyer and politician, 20th Prime Minister of Thailand
- 1941 – Bill Crider, American author (died 2018)
- 1941 – Peter Cullen, Canadian voice actor (died 2026)
- 1941 – Riccardo Muti, Italian conductor and educator
- 1941 – Susan Roces, Filipino actress and producer (died 2022)
- 1942 – Tonia Marketaki, Greek director and screenwriter (died 1994)
- 1942 – John Sattler, Australian rugby league player (died 2023)
- 1943 – Mike Bloomfield, American guitarist and songwriter (died 1981)
- 1943 – Bill Bradley, American basketball player and politician
- 1943 – Richard Wright, English singer-songwriter and keyboard player (died 2008)
- 1945 – Jim Davis, American cartoonist, created Garfield
- 1946 – Jonathan Edwards, American singer-songwriter and guitarist
- 1946 – Linda Kelsey, American actress
- 1946 – Fahmida Riaz, Pakistani poet and activist (died 2018)
- 1947 – Peter Cosgrove, Australian general and politician, 26th Governor General of Australia
- 1947 – Sally Struthers, American actress
- 1948 – Gerald Casale, American singer-songwriter, guitarist, and director
- 1948 – Eiichi Ohtaki, Japanese singer-songwriter and producer (died 2013)
- 1948 – Georgia Engel, American actress and comedian (died 2019)
- 1949 – Vida Blue, American baseball player and sportscaster (died 2023)
- 1949 – Randall Wallace, American screenwriter and producer
- 1949 – Simon Kirke, English drummer
- 1950 – Shahyar Ghanbari, Iranian singer-songwriter
- 1950 – Tapley Seaton, Kittitian politician, 4th Governor-General of Saint Kitts and Nevis (died 2023)
- 1951 – Santiago Calatrava, Spanish architect and engineer, designed the Athens Olympic Sports Complex
- 1951 – Doug Collins, American basketball player and coach
- 1951 – Gregg Giuffria, American rock musician and businessman
- 1951 – Ray Kennedy, English footballer (died 2021)
- 1952 – Glenn A. Baker, Australian journalist and author (died 2026)
- 1952 – Vajiralongkorn, King of Thailand
- 1954 – Hugo Chávez, Venezuelan colonel and politician, President of Venezuela (died 2013)
- 1954 – Gerd Faltings, German mathematician and academic
- 1954 – Nnenna Freelon, American jazz singer, composer, and arranger
- 1954 – Steve Morse, American singer-songwriter and guitarist
- 1954 – Mikey Sheehy, Irish footballer
- 1956 – John Feinstein, American sportswriter and commentator (died 2025)
- 1956 – Robert Swan, English explorer
- 1957 – Scott Pelley, American journalist and author
- 1958 – Terry Fox, Canadian runner and activist (died 1981)
- 1958 – Michael Hitchcock, American actor, producer, and screenwriter
- 1959 – Mark Meadows, American politician, Donald Trump's former Chief of Staff
- 1959 – William T. Vollmann, American novelist, short story writer and journalist
- 1960 – Luiz Fernando Carvalho, Brazilian director, producer, and screenwriter
- 1960 – Jon J. Muth, American author and illustrator
- 1960 – Yōichi Takahashi, Japanese illustrator
- 1961 – Yannick Dalmas, French racing driver
- 1962 – Rachel Sweet, American singer, television writer, and actress
- 1964 – Lori Loughlin, American actress
- 1965 – Priscilla Chan, Hong Kong singer
- 1965 – Delfeayo Marsalis, American jazz musician (trombonist), member of the Marsalis family
- 1966 – Liz Cheney, American politician, daughter of Dick Cheney
- 1966 – Sossina M. Haile, Ethiopian American chemist
- 1966 – Miguel Ángel Nadal, Spanish footballer
- 1966 – Jimmy Pardo, American stand-up comedian, actor, and host
- 1966 – Shikao Suga, Japanese singer-songwriter and guitarist
- 1967 – Taka Hirose, Japanese bass player
- 1969 – Alexis Arquette, American actress (died 2016)
- 1969 – Garth Snow, American ice hockey player and manager
- 1969 – Dana White, American businessman, president of the Ultimate Fighting Championship
- 1970 – Michael Amott, Swedish guitarist and songwriter
- 1970 – Isabelle Brasseur, Canadian figure skater
- 1970 – Paul Strang, Zimbabwean cricketer and coach
- 1971 – Abu Bakr al-Baghdadi, Iraqi leader of the Islamic State of Iraq and the Levant (died 2019)
- 1971 – Ludmilla Lacueva Canut, Andorran writer
- 1971 – Stephen Lynch, American singer-songwriter and actor
- 1971 – Annie Perreault, Canadian speed skater
- 1972 – Robert Chapman, English cricketer
- 1973 – Marc Dupré, Canadian singer-songwriter and guitarist
- 1973 – Steve Staios, Canadian ice hockey player
- 1974 – Afroman, American rapper and comedian
- 1974 – Elizabeth Berkley, American actress
- 1974 – Alexis Tsipras, Greek engineer and politician, 186th Prime Minister of Greece
- 1975 – Leonor Watling, Spanish actress
- 1976 – Jacoby Shaddix, American singer-songwriter
- 1977 – Aki Berg, Finnish-Canadian ice hockey player
- 1977 – Manu Ginóbili, Argentinian basketball player
- 1977 – Miyabiyama Tetsushi, Japanese sumo wrestler
- 1978 – Kārlis Vērdiņš, Latvian poet
- 1978 – Hitomi Yaida, Japanese singer-songwriter and guitarist
- 1979 – Henrik Hansen, Danish footballer
- 1979 – Birgitta Haukdal, Icelandic singer-songwriter and producer
- 1979 – Lee Min-woo, South Korean singer-songwriter and dancer
- 1979 – Alena Popchanka, Belarusian-French swimmer and coach
- 1981 – Michael Carrick, English footballer and coach
- 1981 – Willie Green, American basketball player and coach
- 1982 – Cain Velasquez, Mexican-American mixed martial artist and wrestler
- 1983 – Sam Dastyari, Iranian-Australian politician
- 1983 – Cody Hay, Canadian figure skater
- 1983 – Ilir Latifi, Swedish-Kosovar mixed martial artist
- 1984 – Ali Krieger, American soccer player
- 1984 – Zach Parise, American ice hockey player
- 1984 – DeMeco Ryans, American football player and coach
- 1984 – John David Washington, American actor and football player
- 1985 – Mathieu Debuchy, French footballer
- 1985 – Dustin Milligan, Canadian actor, producer, and screenwriter
- 1986 – Alexandra Chando, American actress
- 1986 – Lauri Korpikoski, Finnish ice hockey player
- 1986 – Essence Carson, American basketball player
- 1986 – Nolan Gerard Funk, Canadian actor
- 1987 – Yevhen Khacheridi, Ukrainian-Greek footballer
- 1987 – Pedro, Spanish footballer
- 1987 – Christofer Ranzmaier, Austrian politician
- 1988 – Gunnar Nelson, Icelandic professional fighter and mixed martial artist
- 1990 – Soulja Boy, American rapper, producer, and actor
- 1990 – Simone Pizzuti, Italian footballer
- 1992 – Spencer Boldman, American actor
- 1993 – Harry Kane, English footballer
- 1993 – Evan Rodrigues, Canadian ice hockey player
- 1993 – Cher Lloyd, English singer
- 1994 – Walker Buehler, American baseball player
- 1994 – Hyojung, South Korean singer
- 1996 – Harriet Dart, British tennis player
- 1999 – GloRilla, American rapper
- 2000 – Emile Smith Rowe, English footballer
- 2003 – Malik Nabers, American football player

== Deaths ==
=== Pre-1600 ===
- 450 – Theodosius II, Roman emperor (born 401)
- 631 – Athanasius I Gammolo, Syriac Orthodox Patriarch of Antioch.
- 938 – Thankmar, half-brother of Otto I (during Siege of Eresburg) (born c. 908)
- 942 – Shi Jingtang, emperor of Later Jin (born 892)
- 1057 – Victor II, pope of the Catholic Church (born 1018)
- 1128 – William Clito, English son of Sybilla of Conversano (born 1102)
- 1230 – Leopold VI, Duke of Austria (born 1176)
- 1271 – Walter de Burgh, 1st Earl of Ulster (born 1220)
- 1285 – Keran, Queen of Armenia ( b. before 1262)
- 1333 – Guy VIII of Viennois, Dauphin of Vienne (born 1309)
- 1345 – Sancia of Majorca, queen regent of Naples (born c. 1285)
- 1458 – John II, king of Cyprus and Armenia (born 1418)
- 1488 – Edward Woodville, Lord Scales (at the Battle of St. Aubin-du-Cormier)
- 1508 – Robert Blackadder, bishop of Glasgow
- 1527 – Rodrigo de Bastidas, Spanish explorer, founded the city of Santa Marta (born 1460)
- 1540 – Thomas Cromwell, English lawyer and politician, Chancellor of the Exchequer (born 1495)
- 1585 – Francis Russell, 2nd Earl of Bedford (born 1527)

=== 1601–1900 ===
- 1631 – Guillén de Castro y Bellvis, Spanish playwright (born 1569)
- 1655 – Cyrano de Bergerac, French poet and playwright (born 1619)
- 1667 – Abraham Cowley, English poet and author (born 1618)
- 1675 – Bulstrode Whitelocke, English lawyer and politician (born 1605)
- 1685 – Henry Bennet, 1st Earl of Arlington, English politician and diplomat, Secretary of State for the Southern Department (born 1618)
- 1718 – Étienne Baluze, French scholar and academic (born 1630)
- 1741 – Antonio Vivaldi, Italian violinist and composer (born 1678)
- 1750 – Johann Sebastian Bach, German organist and composer (born 1685)
- 1762 – George Dodington, 1st Baron Melcombe, English politician, Lord Lieutenant of Somerset (born 1691)
- 1794 – Maximilien Robespierre, French politician, (born 1758)
- 1794 – Louis Antoine de Saint-Just, French soldier and politician (born 1767)
- 1808 – Selim III, Ottoman sultan (born 1761)
- 1809 – Richard Beckett, English cricketer and captain (born 1772)
- 1818 – Gaspard Monge, French mathematician and engineer (born 1746)
- 1835 – Édouard Mortier, duc de Trévise, French general and politician, 15th Prime Minister of France (born 1768)
- 1836 – Nathan Mayer Rothschild, German-English banker and financier (born 1777)
- 1838 – Bernhard Crusell, Finnish composer (born 1775)
- 1842 – Clemens Brentano, German author and poet (born 1778)
- 1844 – Joseph Bonaparte, French diplomat and brother of Napoleon (born 1768)
- 1849 – Charles Albert of Sardinia (born 1798)
- 1869 – Jan Evangelista Purkyně, Czech anatomist and physiologist (born 1787)
- 1878 – George Law Curry, American publisher and politician (born 1820)
- 1885 – Moses Montefiore, British philanthropist, sheriff and banker (born 1784)
- 1895 – Edward Beecher, American minister and theologian (born 1803)

=== 1901–present ===
- 1928 – Édouard-Henri Avril, French painter (born 1849)
- 1930 – John DeWitt, American hammer thrower (born 1881)
- 1930 – Allvar Gullstrand, Swedish ophthalmologist and optician, Nobel Prize laureate (born 1862)
- 1933 – Nishinoumi Kajirō III, Japanese sumo wrestler, 30th yokozuna (born 1890)
- 1934 – Marie Dressler, Canadian-American actress and singer (born 1868)
- 1934 – Louis Tancred, South African cricketer and pilot (born 1876)
- 1935 – Meletius IV of Constantinople (born 1871)
- 1942 – Flinders Petrie, English archaeologist and academic (born 1853)
- 1946 – Saint Alphonsa, first woman of Indian origin to be canonized as a saint by the Catholic Church (born 1910)
- 1957 – Edith Abbott, American economist, social worker, and educator (born 1876)
- 1957 – Isaac Heinemann, German-Israeli scholar and academic (born 1876)
- 1963 – Carl Borgward, German engineer, founder of Borgward Group
- 1965 – Edogawa Ranpo, Japanese author and critic (born 1894)
- 1965 – Attallah Suheimat, Jordanian politician (born 1875)
- 1967 – Karl W. Richter, American lieutenant and pilot (born 1942)
- 1968 – Otto Hahn, German chemist and academic, Nobel Prize laureate (born 1879)
- 1969 – Ramón Grau, Cuban physician and politician, 6th President of Cuba (born 1882)
- 1969 – Frank Loesser, American composer (born 1910)
- 1971 – Lawrence Moore Cosgrave, Canadian colonel and diplomat (born 1890)
- 1971 – Myril Hoag, American baseball player (born 1908)
- 1971 – Charles E. Pont, French-American minister and painter (born 1898)
- 1972 – Helen Traubel, American soprano and actress (born 1903)
- 1976 – Maggie Gripenberg, Finnish dancer and choreographer (born 1881)
- 1979 – Don Miller, American football player and coach (born 1902)
- 1979 – Charles Shadwell, English conductor and bandleader (born 1898)
- 1980 – Rose Rand, Austrian-born American logician and philosopher (born 1903)
- 1981 – Stanley Rother, American priest and missionary (born 1935)
- 1982 – Keith Green, American singer-songwriter and pianist (born 1953)
- 1987 – Jack Renshaw, Australian politician, 31st Premier of New South Wales (born 1909)
- 1990 – Jill Esmond, English actress (born 1908)
- 1992 – Sulev Nõmmik, Estonian actor and director (born 1931)
- 1993 – Stanley Woods, Irish motorcycle racer (born 1903)
- 1996 – Roger Tory Peterson, American ornithologist and academic (born 1908)
- 1997 – Rosalie Crutchley, English actress (born 1920)
- 1997 – Seni Pramoj, Thai lawyer and politician, 6th Prime Minister of Thailand (born 1905)
- 1998 – Zbigniew Herbert, Polish poet and author (born 1924)
- 1998 – Lenny McLean, English boxer, actor, and author (born 1949)
- 1998 – Consalvo Sanesi, Italian racing driver (born 1911)
- 1999 – Trygve Haavelmo, Norwegian economist and mathematician, Nobel Prize laureate (born 1911)
- 2000 – Abraham Pais, Dutch-American physicist and historian (born 1918)
- 2001 – Ahmed Sofa, Bangladeshi poet, author, and critic (born 1943)
- 2002 – Archer John Porter Martin, English chemist and academic, Nobel Prize laureate (born 1910)
- 2003 – Valerie Goulding, Irish activist and politician (born 1918)
- 2004 – Francis Crick, English biologist and biophysicist, Nobel Prize laureate (born 1916)
- 2004 – Tiziano Terzani, Italian journalist and author (born 1938)
- 2006 – David Gemmell, English author (born 1948)
- 2007 – Karl Gotch, Belgian-American wrestler and trainer (born 1924)
- 2007 – Jim LeRoy, American soldier and pilot (born 1961)
- 2009 – Jim Johnson, American football player and coach (born 1941)
- 2011 – Abdul Fatah Younis, Libyan general (born 1944)
- 2012 – Colin Horsley, New Zealand-English pianist and educator (born 1920)
- 2012 – Sepp Mayerl, Austrian mountaineer (born 1937)
- 2012 – William F. Milliken Jr., American race car driver and engineer (born 1911)
- 2013 – Mustafa Adrisi, Ugandan general and politician, 3rd Vice President of Uganda (born 1922)
- 2013 – Eileen Brennan, American actress and singer (born 1932)
- 2013 – Rita Reys, Dutch jazz singer (born 1924)
- 2013 – William Scranton, American captain and politician, 13th United States Ambassador to the United Nations (born 1917)
- 2013 – Ersilio Tonini, Italian cardinal (born 1914)
- 2014 – Alex Forbes, Scottish footballer and manager (born 1925)
- 2014 – Alakbar Mammadov, Azerbaijani footballer and manager (born 1930)
- 2015 – Jan Kulczyk, Polish businessman (born 1950)
- 2015 – Edward Natapei, Vanuatuan politician, 6th Prime Minister of Vanuatu (born 1954)
- 2015 – Clive Rice, South African cricketer and coach (born 1949)
- 2016 – Émile Derlin Zinsou, Beninese politician (born 1918)
- 2016 – Mahasweta Devi, Indian Bengali fiction writer and socio-political activist (born 1926)
- 2018 – Wanny van Gils, Dutch footballer (born 1959)
- 2020 – Junrey Balawing, Filipino record holder (born 1993)
- 2021 – Dusty Hill, American musician (born 1949)
- 2022 – Bernard Cribbins, British actor (born 1928)
- 2024 – John Anderson, Scottish television personality, teacher and coach (born 1931)
- 2024 – Doug Creek, American baseball player (born 1969)
- 2024 – Reyes Moronta, Dominican baseball player (born 1993)
- 2024 – Francine Pascal, American author (born 1932)
- 2025 – Laura Dahlmeier, German biathlete, Olympic champion (born 1993)

== Holidays and observances ==
- Christian feast day:
  - Alphonsa Muttathupadathu (Syro-Malabar Catholic Church)
  - Botvid
  - Jaime Hilario Barbal
  - Johann Sebastian Bach, George Frederick Handel, Henry Purcell (Episcopal Church commemoration)
  - Johann Sebastian Bach, Heinrich Schütz, George Frederick Handel (Lutheran commemoration)
  - Nazarius and Celsus
  - Pedro Poveda Castroverde
  - Pope Victor I
  - Samson of Dol
  - July 28 (Eastern Orthodox liturgics)
- Day of Commemoration of the Great Upheaval (Canada)
- Fiestas Patrias, celebrates the independence of Peru from Spain by General José de San Martín in 1821.
- Liberation Day (San Marino)
- Ólavsøka Eve (Faroe Islands)
- World Hepatitis Day
