= 484 =

Calendar year

484 in various calendars
- Gregorian calendar: 484; CDLXXXIV
- Ab urbe condita: 1237
- Assyrian calendar: 5234
- Balinese saka calendar: 405–406
- Bengali calendar: −110 – −109
- Berber calendar: 1434
- Buddhist calendar: 1028
- Burmese calendar: −154
- Byzantine calendar: 5992–5993
- Chinese calendar: 癸亥年 (Water Pig); 3181 or 2974 — to — 甲子年 (Wood Rat); 3182 or 2975
- Coptic calendar: 200–201
- Discordian calendar: 1650
- Ethiopian calendar: 476–477
- Hebrew calendar: 4244–4245
- Hindu calendars
- Vikram Samvat: 540–541
- Shaka Samvat: 405–406
- Kali Yuga: 3584–3585
- Holocene calendar: 10484
- Iranian calendar: 138 BP – 137 BP
- Islamic calendar: 142 BH – 141 BH
- Javanese calendar: 370–371
- Julian calendar: 484; CDLXXXIV
- Korean calendar: 2817
- Minguo calendar: 1428 before ROC 民前1428年
- Nanakshahi calendar: −984
- Seleucid era: 795/796 AG
- Thai solar calendar: 1026–1027
- Tibetan calendar: ཆུ་མོ་ཕག་ལོ་ (female Water-Boar); 610 or 229 or −543 — to — ཤིང་ཕོ་བྱི་བ་ལོ་ (male Wood-Rat); 611 or 230 or −542

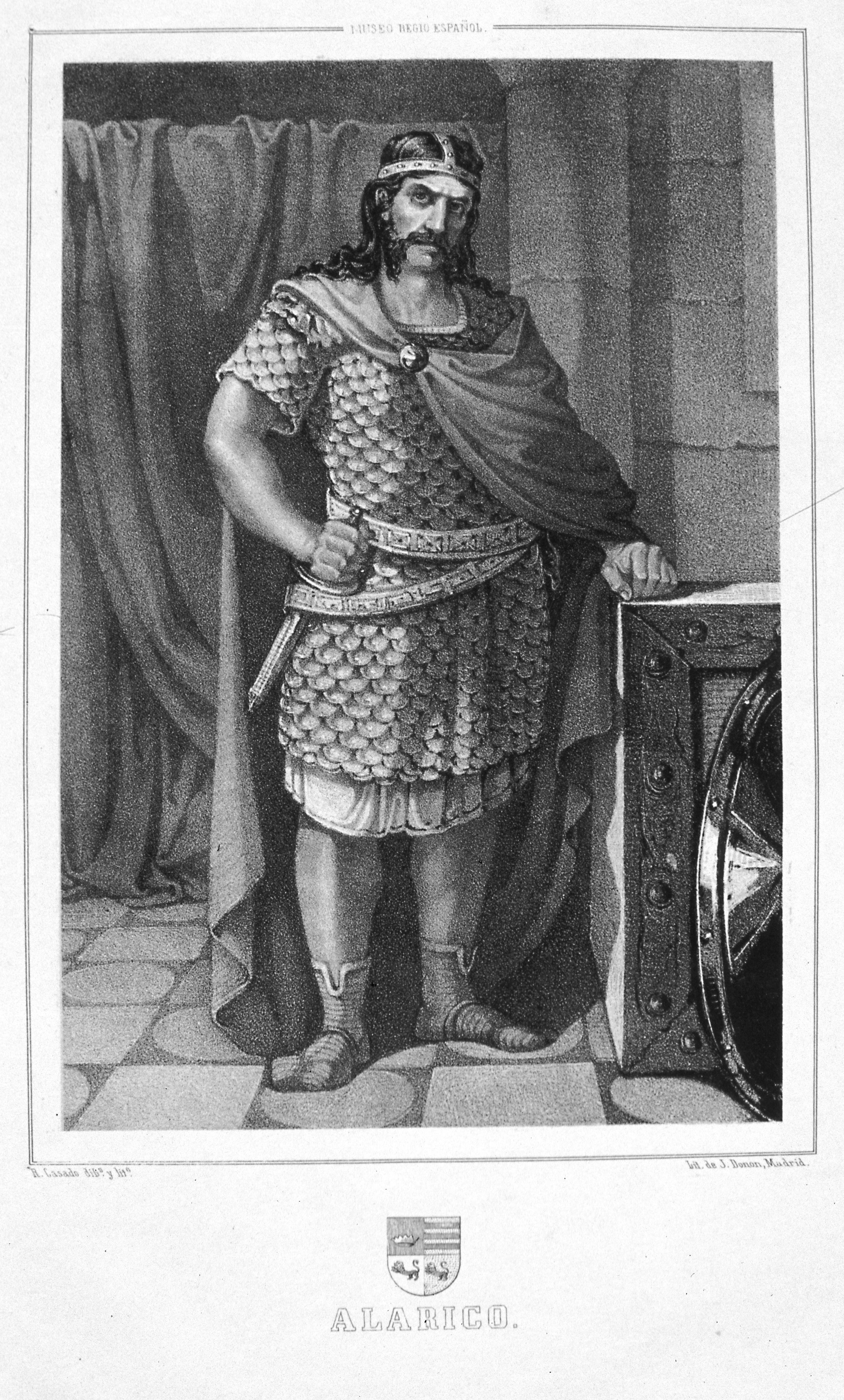
King Alaric II (484–507)

The Visigothic Kingdom

Year 484 (CDLXXXIV) was a leap year starting on Sunday of the Julian calendar. At the time, it was known as the Year of the Consulship of Venantius and Theodoricus (or, less frequently, year 1237 Ab urbe condita). The denomination 484 for this year has been used since the early medieval period, when the Anno Domini calendar era became the prevalent method in Europe for naming years.

== Events ==
=== By place ===
==== Byzantine Empire ====
- July 19 – Leontius, Roman usurper, is crowned emperor at Tarsus (modern Turkey). Empress dowager Verina sends a letter to the governors of the Diocese of the East and the Diocese of Egypt for support. He is recognized in Antioch and makes it his capital.
- Leontius raises a rebellion against emperor Zeno, who also faces a revolt from the Ostrogoth king Theodoric the Great. He sends an army to Syria, but is defeated by the Byzantine general Illus.
- Zeno signs a peace treaty with Theodoric the Great. He appoints him to magister militum and becomes a consul. The Eastern Empire is saved by diplomatic negotiations, and the imperial army is strengthened behind the walls of Constantinople.

==== Europe ====
- King Gundobad proclaims the Lex Burgundionum, a law code of the Burgundians concerning marriage and inheritance, as well as regulating weregild and other penalties (approximate date).
- December 28 – The Visigoth king Euric dies and is succeeded by his son Alaric II. Euric has built a rampart to protect the city of Carcassonne southeast of Toulouse, on a bend of the Aude River.

==== Africa ====
- February 24 – King Huneric passes the Edict of 484, a law banning Catholicism within the Vandal Kingdom. A few weeks later, King Huneric removes Catholic bishops from their offices and banishes some to Corsica. A few are martyred, including former proconsul Victorian along with Frumentius and other merchants. They are killed at Hadrumetum after refusing to become Arians.
- December 23 – Huneric dies and is succeeded by his nephew Gunthamund, who becomes king of the Vandals. During his reign the Catholics are free from persecutions and he stabilises the kingdom's economy.

==== Asia ====
- The Hephthalites (White Huns) invade Persia. King Peroz I gathers an army of 50,000-100,000 men, and places his brother Balash at the head of the government in Ctesiphon. At the Battle of Herat, the Persians are ambushed and defeated. Peroz I is killed, whose body is not found. Balash is crowned and becomes king of Persia.
- The Nvarsak Treaty is concluded between the Persians and Armenians.

=== By topic ===
==== Religion ====
- Pope Felix III excommunicates Acacius of Constantinople and Peter III of Alexandria, for their role in having Zeno issue his Edict of Union (Henotikon) 2 years ago. He considers the edict to be heretical and the schism between the Church of Rome and the Church of Constantinople widens. The Acacian Schism will not be resolved until 519.

== Births ==
- Antonina, Byzantine patrikia and wife of Belisarius (approximate date)
- Brendan, Irish abbot and saint (approximate date)

== Deaths ==
- December 23 – Huneric, king of the Vandals
- Euric, king of the Visigoths
- Peroz I, king of the Persian Empire
- Seinei, emperor of Japan
- Verina, wife of former emperor Leo I
