= Patriarch John of Alexandria =

Patriarch John of Alexandria may refer to:

- John Talaia, Patriarch of Alexandria in 481–482
- Pope John I (II) of Alexandria, Patriarch of Alexandria in 496–505
- Pope John II (III) of Alexandria, Patriarch of Alexandria in 505–516
- Patriarch John IV of Alexandria, Greek Patriarch of Alexandria in 569–579
- Patriarch John V of Alexandria, Greek Patriarch of Alexandria in 610–619
- Patriarch John VI of Alexandria, Greek Patriarch of Alexandria in 1062–1100

== See also ==
- Patriarch John (disambiguation)
- John of Alexandria (disambiguation)
