= Pope Hormisdas =

Head of the Catholic Church from 514 to 523

Pope Saint Hormisdas
- Bishop of Rome
- Church: Catholic Church
- Papacy began: 20 July 514
- Papacy ended: 6 August 523
- Predecessor: Symmachus
- Successor: John I

Orders
- Created cardinal: before 514 by Symmachus
- Rank: Cardinal-Deacon

Personal details
- Born: c. 450 Frusino, Western Roman Empire
- Died: 6 August 523 (aged 72 – 73) Rome, Kingdom of the Ostrogoths
- Children: 1, Pope Silverius

Sainthood
- Feast day: 6 August

Pope Hormisdas (/hɔːrˈmɪzdəs/; c. 450 – 6 August 523) was the bishop of Rome from 20 July 514 to his death on 6 August 523. His papacy was dominated by the Acacian schism, started in 484 by Acacius of Constantinople's efforts to placate the non-Chalcedonians. His efforts to resolve this schism were successful, and on 28 March 519, the reunion between Constantinople and Rome was ratified in the cathedral of Constantinople before a large crowd.

== Family and early career ==
Hormisdas was born in Frusino in the moribund era of the Western Roman Empire. His Persian name was probably given in honour of an exiled Persian noble, Hormizd, "celebrated in the Roman martyrology (8 August) but not so honoured in the East." The names of his father and son suggest he had an otherwise "straightforward Italian pedigree". However, according to Iranica he was probably related to Hormizd.

Before becoming a deacon, Hormisdas was married and had a son, Silverius, who later became pope. During the Laurentian schism, Hormisdas was one of the most prominent clerical partisans of Pope Symmachus. He was notary at the synod held at St. Peter's in 502. Two letters of Magnus Felix Ennodius, bishop of Pavia, survive addressed to him, written when the latter tried to regain horses and money he had lent the Pope.

== Pontificate ==
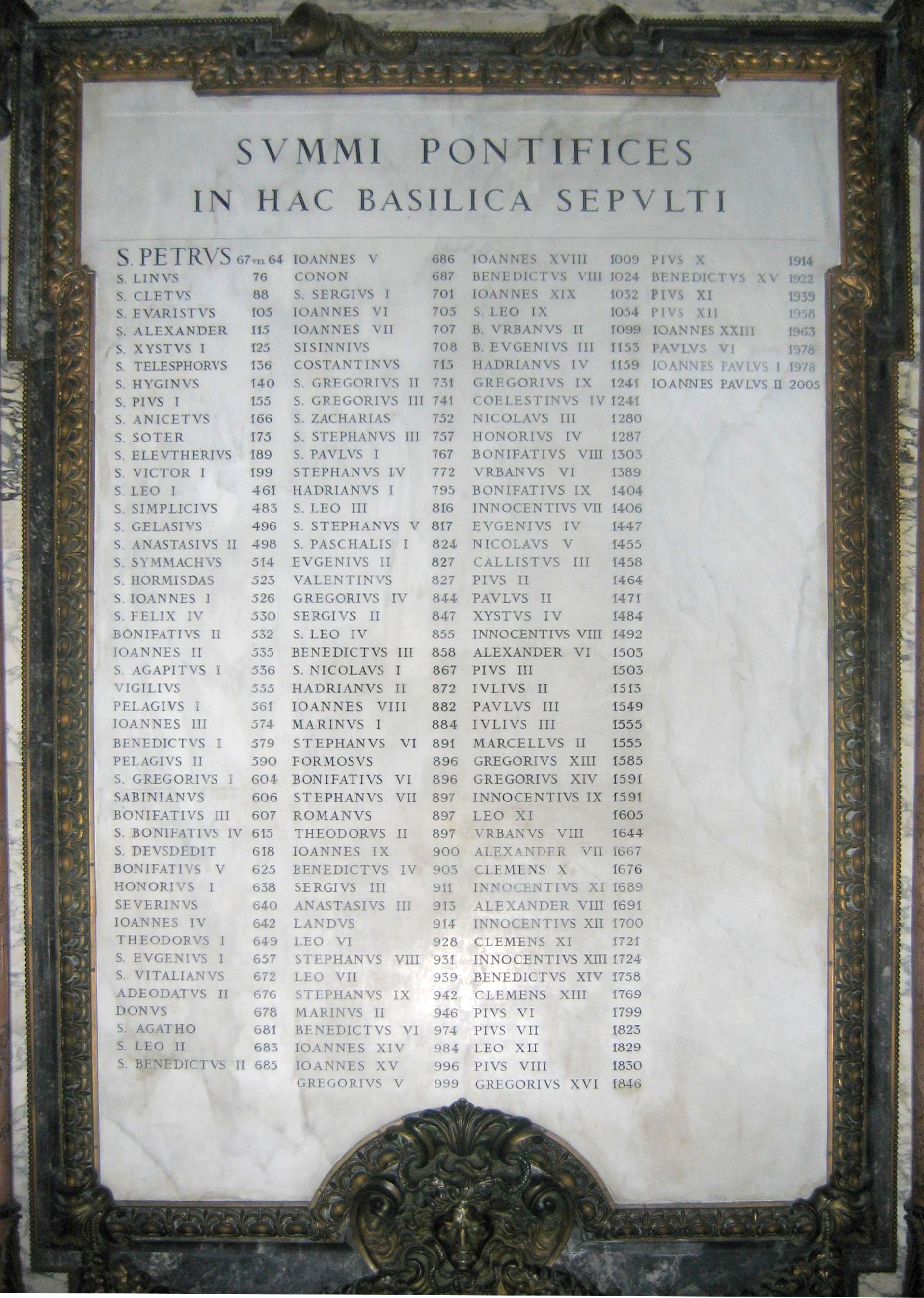
List of popes buried in St. Peter's, with Hormisdas listed in the first column.

Unlike that of his predecessor Symmachus, the election of Hormisdas lacked any notable controversies. Upon becoming pope, one of Hormisdas' first actions was to remove the last vestiges of the schism in Rome, receiving back into the Church those adherents of the Laurentian party who had not already been reconciled. "The schism had lingered on largely out of personal hatred to Symmachus," writes Jeffrey Richards, "something with which Hormisdas was apparently not tainted."

The account of his tenure in the Liber Pontificalis, as well as the overwhelming bulk of his surviving correspondence, is dominated by efforts to restore communion between the Sees of Rome and Constantinople, which had been broken by the Acacian schism. This schism occurred over the "Henotikon" of Emperor Zeno, which was also accepted by his Miaphysite successor Anastasius I.

Anastasius took the first steps to resolve this schism, under pressure from Vitalian, the commander of the imperial cavalry. Vitalian, opposed to the Henotikon, led Thracia, Scythia Minor, and Mysia in revolt, and marched with an army of Huns and Bulgars to the gates of Constantinople. Richards also notes that some tentative efforts from Constantinople were likely, "if only because there was a new man on the throne of St. Peter. Relations between Symmachus and the emperor Anastasius had been virtually non-existent."

Anastasius wrote to Hormisdas on 28 December 514, inviting him to a synod that would be held 1 July of the following year. Anastasius also sent second, less courteous invitation, dated 12 January 515, was by to the pope, which reached Rome before the first. On 4 April Hormisdas answered, expressing his delight at the prospect of peace, but at the same time defending the position of his predecessors, and welcoming a synod, but believing it unnecessary. The emperor's first letter at last reached Rome on 14 May. The pope guardedly carried on negotiations, convened a synod at Rome, and wrote to the emperor on 8 July to announce the departure of an embassy for Constantinople. Meanwhile, the two hundred bishops who had assembled on 1 July at Heraclea separated without accomplishing anything.

The pope's embassy to the imperial court consisted of two bishops, Ennodius of Pavia and Fortunatus of Catina, the priest Venantius, the deacon Vitalis, and the notary Hilarius. According to Rev. J. Barmby, Hormisdas made several demands: (1) The emperor should publicly announce his acceptance of the Council of Chalcedon and the letters of Pope Leo; (2) the Eastern bishops should make a similar public declaration, and in addition anathematize Nestorius, Eutyches, Dioscorus, Aelurus, Peter Mongus, Peter the Fuller, and Acacius, with all their followers; (3) everyone exiled in this dispute should be recalled and their cases reserved for the judgment of the Apostolic See; (4) those exiles who had been in communion with Rome and professed Catholicism should first be recalled; and (5) bishops accused of having persecuted the Orthodox should be sent to Rome to be judged. "Thus the emperor proposed a free discussion in council; the pope required the unqualified acceptance of orthodoxy, and submission to himself as head of Christendom, before he would treat at all."

An imperial embassy of two high civil officials came to Rome bringing one letter dated 16 July 516 for the pope, and one dated 28 July for the Roman Senate; the aim of the latter was to convince the senators to take a stand against Hormisdas. However both the Senate, as well as King Theodoric, stayed loyal to the pope. Meanwhile, Hormisdas reported to Avitus of Vienne that an additional number of Balkan bishops had entered into relations with Rome, and Bishop John of Nicopolis, who was also the archbishop of Epirus, had broken communion with Constantinople and resumed it with Rome.

A second papal embassy consisting of Ennodius and Bishop Peregrinus of Misenum was as unsuccessful as the first. Anastasius even attempted to bribe the legates, but was unsuccessful. Secure now that Vitalian had been defeated outside Constantinople, forced into hiding, and his supporters executed, Anastasius announced on 11 July 517 that he was breaking off the negotiations. But less than a year later the emperor died; the Liber Pontificalis claims he was struck dead by a thunderbolt. His successor, the Catholic Justin I, immediately reversed Anastasius' policies. All the demands of Pope Hormisdas were granted: the name of the condemned Patriarch Acacius as well as the names of the Emperors Anastasius and Zeno were stricken from the church diptychs, and the Patriarch John II accepted the formula of Hormisdas. Some maintain that he did so with some qualifications. This argument is based on the following quote:"I declare that the see of apostle Peter and the see of this imperial city are one."

However, the East continued to disregard papal demands by not condemning Acacius. On 28 March 519, in the cathedral of Constantinople in the presence of a great throng of people, the end of the schism was concluded in a solemn ceremony.

Hormisdas died in AD 523 and was buried in Old St. Peter's Basilica; his tomb was destroyed during the construction of the new basilica.

== Sources ==
- Meyendorff, John (1989). Imperial unity and Christian divisions: The Church 450–680 A.D. The Church in history. Vol. 2. Crestwood, NY: St. Vladimir's Seminary Press. ISBN 978-0-88-141056-3.
- "ORMISDA".

Catholic Church titles
Preceded by Symmachus	Pope; 514–523	Succeeded by John I
