= John II of Alexandria =

John II of Alexandria may refer to:

- Pope John I (II) of Alexandria (Patriarch John II of Alexandria), ruled in 496–505
- Pope John II (III) of Alexandria (Patriarch John III of Alexandria), ruled in 505–516
