= Patriarch John I =

Patriarch John I may refer to:

- John Talaia, Patriarch John I of Alexandria in 481–482
- Pope John I (II) of Alexandria, ruled in 496–505
- John I, Maronite Patriarch (designation contended among various people)

== See also ==
- Patriarch John (disambiguation)
