= John I of Alexandria =

John I of Alexandria may refer to:

- John Talaia, ruled in 481–482
- Pope John I of Alexandria (Patriarch John II of Alexandria), ruled in 496–505
