= Timothy of Alexandria =

Timothy of Alexandria may refer to:

- Timothy I of Alexandria, patriarch of Alexandria from 381 to 384
- Timothy II of Alexandria, patriarch of Alexandria from 457 to 477
- Timothy Salophakiolos, patriarch of Alexandria from 460 to 475 and from 477 to 481; not recognized by the Coptic Church
- Timothy IV of Alexandria, known within the Coptic Church as Timothy III, patriarch of Alexandria from 517 to 535
