= Timothy III =

Timothy III may refer to:

- Timothy Salophakiolos, patriarch of Alexandria in 460–475 and 477–481, considered Timothy III by the Greek Orthodox Church
- Timothy IV of Alexandria, patriarch of Alexandria in 517–535, considered Timothy III in the Coptic Church
