= 519th =

519th may refer to:

- 519th Air Defense Group, disbanded United States Air Force organization
- 519th Fighter-Interceptor Squadron, inactive United States Air Force unit
- 519th Military Intelligence Battalion (United States), unit of the United States Army

== See also ==
- 519 (number)
- 519, the year 519 (DXIX) of the Julian calendar
- 519 BC
