= Pizzuti =

Pizzuti is an Italian surname. Notable people with the surname include:

- Juan Flere Pizzuti (born 1998), Argentine footballer
- Juan José Pizzuti (1927–2020), Argentine footballer and manager
- Simone Pizzuti (born 1990), Italian footballer
