= Gennadius of Constantinople =

Patriarch of Constantinople from 458 to 471

Saint Gennadius of Constantinople
- Patriarch of Constantinople
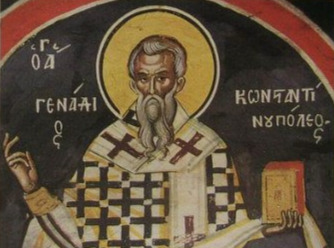
- Fresco from Dionysiou Monastery
- Installed: August 458
- Term ended: 17 November 471
- Predecessor: Anatolius of Constantinople
- Successor: Acacius of Constantinople

Personal details
- Born: Antioch, Syria Prima
- Died: 17 November 471 Moro Nero, Roman Cyprus
- Denomination: Chalcedonian Christianity

Sainthood
- Feast day: 17 November
- Venerated in: Eastern Orthodox Church

Gennadius of Constantinople (Greek: Γεννάδιος; died 17 November 471) was the patriarch of Constantinople from August 458 until his death. Gennadius is known to have been a learned writer who followed the School of Antioch of literal exegesis, although few writings have been left about him. He is commemorated in the Eastern Orthodox Church on 17 November but is not listed in the Roman Martyrology.

== Biography ==
His first public writing was quoted by Facundus (Defensio, II, iv) against Cyril of Alexandria in two works, probably in 431 or 432, including a passage to show that his work was more violent even than the letter of Ibas. The 12 Anathemas of Saint Cyril and Two Books to Parthenius were criticised. In the latter he exclaims, "How many times have I heard blasphemies from Cyril of Alexandria? Woe to the scourge of Alexandria!". In 433 Gennadius probably reconciled with Cyril. If Cyril's letter of 434 (Ep. LVI) is to the same Gennadius, they were friends in that year. Gennadius was a presbyter at Constantinople when he succeeded Anatolius of Constantinople in 458 as the Bishop of Constantinople. From the beginning of his episcopate Gennadius proved his zeal for the Christian faith and the maintenance of discipline. His discretion was before long tested.

Timothy II of Alexandria, the monophysite who made himself the Patriarch of Alexandria and was later chased from the Patriarchate by order of the Roman emperor, had obtained leave to come to Constantinople, intending to re-establish himself on his throne. On 17 June 460, Pope Leo I warned Gennadius (Ep. CLXX) against Timothy II, and urged him to prevent the voyage of Timothy II and to secure the immediate consecration of an Orthodox Patriarch for Alexandria. Timothy II was banished to the Chersonese, and Timothy Salophakiolos was chosen bishop of Alexandria in his stead. About the same time, Gennadius' liberality and desire for order was observed in his appointment of Marcian, a Novatianist who had come over to the Catholic Church, the oeconomus of the goods of the church of Constantinople.

Two Egyptian solitaries told John Moschus a story which is also recorded by Theodorus Lector. The church of Saint Pope Eleutherius at Constantinople was served by a reader named Carisius, who led a disorderly life. Gennadius first reprimanded him and then had him flogged. When both measures proved ineffectual, the patriarch prayed to Eleutherius to either correct the unworthy reader or to take him from the world. Next day Carisius was found dead, to the terror of the whole town. Theodorus also relates how a painter, presuming to depict the Saviour under the form of Jupiter, had his hand withered, but was healed by the prayers of Gennadius.

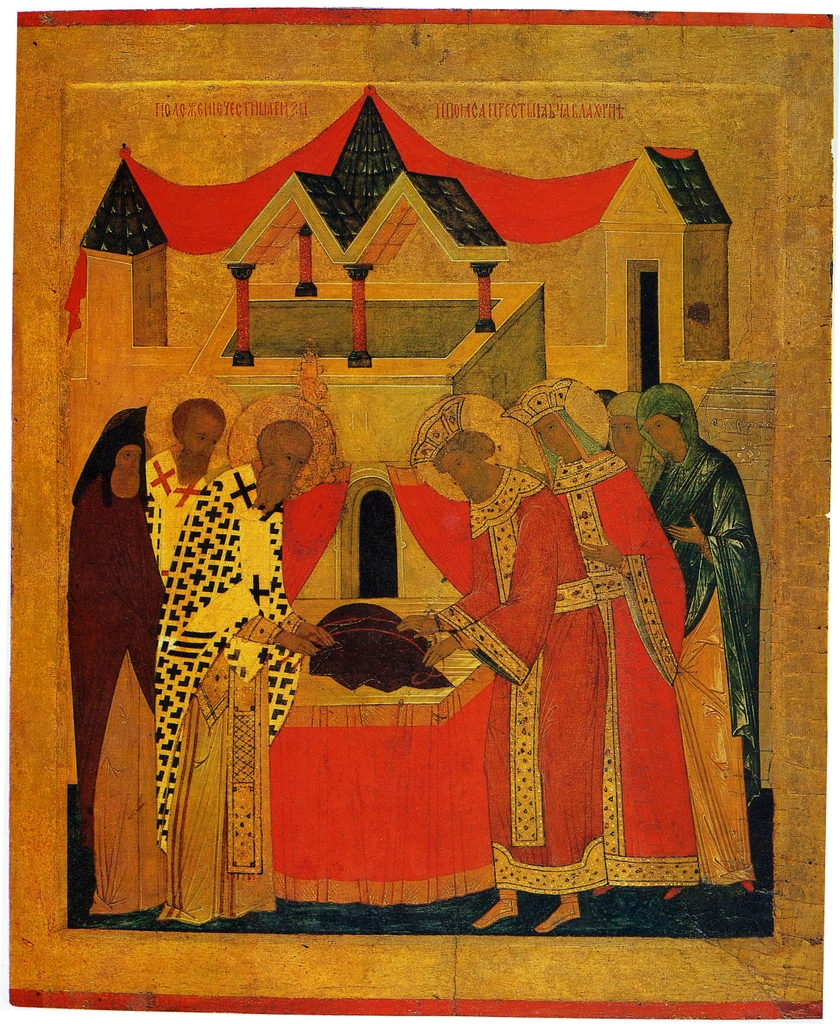
Deposition of the Robe of the Virgin Mary (XVth century)

About the same time Daniel the Stylite began to live on a column near Constantinople, apparently without the permission of the Patriarch or the owner of the property where the pillar stood, who strongly objected to this strange invasion of his land. The Emperor Leo I protected the ascetic, and some time later sent Gennadius to ordain him priest, which he is said to have done standing at the foot of the column because Daniel objected to being ordained and refused to let the bishop mount the ladder. At the end of the rite, however, the patriarch ascended to give Holy Communion to the stylite and to receive it from him. Whether he then imposed his hands on him is not said. Possibly he considered it sufficient to extend them from below towards Daniel. According to Theodorus Lector, Gennadius would allow no one to become a cleric unless he had learned the Psalter by heart.

Measures had been taken against simony, the buying and selling of holy orders, by the Council of Chalcedon. It seems not later than 459, Gennadius celebrated a great council of 81 bishops, many of whom were from the East and even from Egypt, including those who had been dispossessed of their sees by Timothy II of Alexandria. The letter of this council against simony is still preserved (Giovanni Domenico Mansi, VII, 912). An encyclical was issued, adding anathema to the former sentence.

His career performance was summarized by a twentieth century biographer as:

"an able and successful administrator, for whom no historian has anything but praise, if we except the criticism naturally aroused by his attack in his younger days against Cyril of Alexandria, an attack which the unmeasured language of Cyril perhaps excuses."

== Biblical works ==
John Moschus described Gennadius as very mild and of great purity. Gennadius of Massilia said Gennadius was lingua nitidus et ingenio acer (refined tongue and sharp intellect), and so rich in knowledge of the ancients that he composed a commentary on the whole Book of Daniel. The continuation of Jerome's Chronicle by Marcellinus Comes tells us (according to some manuscripts) that Gennadius commented on all epistles of Paul of Tarsus.

Gennadius wrote a commentary on Daniel and many other parts of Old Testament and on all the Pauline epistles, and a great number of homilies. Of these only a few fragments remain. The principal fragments of his biblical works include Genesis, Exodus, Psalms, Romans, 1 and 2 Corinthians, Galatians, and Hebrews, and are interesting specimens of 5th century exegesis. Some fragments are collected in Jacques Paul Migne, Patrologia Graeca, LXXXV, chiefly from the two catena of John Antony Cramer on Romans; a few passages are found in the catena of Oecumenius, others in the catena of Nikephoros Kallistos Xanthopoulos, and a few in the Vienna MS. gr. 166 (46).

Gennadius exhibited a learned style and followed the Antiochene school of literal exegesis. Romans, a series of explanatory remarks on isolated texts, is his most significant work.

== Notes and references ==
=== Attribution ===
Titles of Chalcedonian Christianity
Preceded by Anatolius	Patriarch of Constantinople; 458 – 471	Succeeded by Acacius
