= Christofer =

Christofer is a male given name and surname. It is a variant of Christopher.

== People with the given name ==
- Christofer Bergenblock (born 1974), Swedish politician
- Christofer Blomstrand (born 1991), Swedish professional golfer
- Christofer Clemente, Australian scientist
- Christofer Drew (born 1991), American painter and former musician
- Christofer Erixon (born 1987), Swedish songwriter, composer and music producer
- Christofer Fjellner (born 1976), Swedish politician
- Christofer Gonzáles (born 1992), Peruvian professional footballer
- Christofer Gyllenstierna (1942–2025), Swedish diplomat
- Christofer Heimeroth (born 1981), German professional footballer
- Christofer Johnsson (born 1972), Swedish musician and producer
- Christofer Jurado (born 1995), Panamanian cyclist
- Christofer Löfberg (born 1986), Swedish ice hockey player
- Christofer Malmström, Swedish lead guitarist
- Christofer Olivius Ferslew (1874–1940), Norwegian jurist and politician
- Christofer Rahm (born 1998), Swedish professional golfer
- Christofer Ranzmaier (born 1987), Austrian politician
- Christofer Stevenson (born 1982), Swedish professional cyclist

== See also ==
- Christopher
