= Patriarch John II =

Patriarch John II may refer to:

- Patriarch John II Codonatus of Antioch (ruled in 476–477)
- Pope John I (II) of Alexandria (Patriarch John II of Alexandria), ruled in 496–505
- Pope John II (III) of Alexandria (Patriarch John III of Alexandria), ruled in 505–516
- John II, Maronite Patriarch (designation contended among various people)
