= Pope John of Alexandria =

John has been the papal name of several Coptic Popes.

- Pope John I of Alexandria (496–505)
- Pope John II (III) of Alexandria (505–516)
- Pope John III of Alexandria (677–688)
- Pope John IV of Alexandria (776–799)
- Pope John V of Alexandria (1147–1166)
- Pope John VI of Alexandria (1189–1216)
- Pope John VII of Alexandria (1261–1268, 1271–1293)
- Pope John VIII of Alexandria (1300–1320)
- Pope John IX of Alexandria (1320–1327)
- Pope John X of Alexandria (1363–1369)
- Pope John XI of Alexandria (1427–1452)
- Pope John XII of Alexandria (1480–1483)
- Pope John XIII of Alexandria (1483–1524)
- Pope John XIV of Alexandria (1573–1589)
- Pope John XV of Alexandria (1621–1631)
- Pope John XVI of Alexandria (1676–1718)
- Pope John XVII of Alexandria (1727–1745)
- Pope John XVIII of Alexandria (1769–1796)
- Pope John XIX of Alexandria (1928–1942)

== See also ==
- List of Coptic Popes
