= Patriarch John III =

Patriarch John III may refer to:

- Pope John II (III) of Alexandria (Patriarch John III of Alexandria), ruled in 505–516
- Patriarch John III of Jerusalem, patriarch of Antioch from 846 to 873
- Patriarch John III of Antioch (ruled in 797–810)
- John III, Maronite Patriarch (designation contended among various people)
