= Pope John =

Pope John may refer to any of the following Catholic Popes John:

1. Pope John I (saint; 523–526)
2. Pope John II (533–535)
3. Pope John III (561–574)
4. Pope John IV (640–642)
5. Pope John V (685–686)
6. Pope John VI (701–705)
7. Pope John VII (705–707)
  - Antipope John VIII (844)
8. Pope John VIII (872–882)
9. Pope John IX (898–900)
10. Pope John X (914–928)
11. Pope John XI (931–935)
12. Pope John XII (955–964)
13. Pope John XIII (965–972)
14. Pope John XIV (983–984)
  - Pope John XIVb (a mistake in the numbering)
15. Pope John XV (985–996)
  - Antipope John XVI (997–998)
16. Pope John XVII (1003)
17. Pope John XVIII (1003–1009)
18. Pope John XIX (1024–1032)
  - Pope John XX (the number XX was skipped)
19. Pope John XXI (1276–1277)
20. Pope John XXII (1316–1334)
  - Antipope John XXIII (1410–1415)
21. Pope John XXIII (saint; 1958–1963)

Pope John may also refer to any of the 19 Popes John of Alexandria.

== See also ==
- John Pope (disambiguation)
- List of popes
- Pope John Paul (disambiguation)
- Pope Joan
- Pope John numbering
