= Pope Athanasius II of Alexandria =

Head of the Coptic Church from 489 to 496

- Pope of Alexandria & Patriarch of the See of St. Mark
- Papacy began: 489
- Papacy ended: 30 September 496
- Predecessor: Peter III
- Successor: John I

Personal details
- Born: Unknown Egypt
- Died: 30 September 496
- Buried: Saint Mark's Church
- Denomination: Coptic Orthodox Christian
- Residence: Saint Mark's Church

Pope Athanasius II of Alexandria, (d. 496), was the 28th Coptic Pope of Alexandria & Patriarch of the See of St. Mark.

When Pope Peter III of Alexandria died, the bishops, elders and people agreed to ordain Athanasius as the next Patriarch. He retained the post until his death three years and nine months later.

He is commemorated in the Calendar of Saints of the Coptic Church on the 20th day of Thout, the day of his death.

Preceded by Peter III	Coptic Pope; 490–496	Succeeded by John I (II)
Preceded by Peter III	Patriarch of Alexandria; 490–496	Succeeded by John I (II)
