= Rav Rahumi III =

Babylonian rabbi

Rav Rahumi (III) (or Rihumai; Hebrew: רב רחומי, read as Rav Rahumi, or Hebrew: רב ריחומי, read as Rav Rihumai) was a Babylonian rabbi of the fifth century (eighth and last generation of amoraim, and first generation of savoraim).

Some identify him also with a rabbi whose name appears as Nihumai, (Hebrew: ניחומי).

He was one of the arrangers of the Babylonian Talmud and engaged in the process of its completion. According to the Iggeret Rav Sherira Gaon he died in the year 506 (ניסן שנת ד'רס"ו; Hebrew calendar). He is known for disputing with Rabbah Jose.
