= Acacius of Constantinople =

Patriarch of Constantinople from 472 to 489

Saint Acacius of Constantinople
- Patriarch of Constantinople
- Native name: Ἀκάκιος
- Installed: February 472
- Term ended: 26 November 489
- Predecessor: Gennadius of Constantinople
- Successor: Fravitta of Constantinople

Personal details
- Died: 26 November 489
- Denomination: Eastern Christianity

Sainthood
- Feast day: 30 of the Coptic Month of Hathor
- Venerated in: Oriental Orthodox Churches (Coptic Orthodox Church)

Acacius of Constantinople (Greek: Ἀκάκιος; died 26 November 489) served as the patriarch of Constantinople from 472 to 489. He was practically the first prelate in the East and was renowned for his ambitious participation in the Chalcedonian controversy. His controversial attempts at healing the theological divisions led to the Acacian schism and his being condemned by the Chalcedonian churches. He is revered as a saint in Oriental Orthodoxy.

Acacius advised the Byzantine emperor Zeno to issue the Henotikon Edict in 482, which condemned Nestorius of Constantinople and Eutyches, accepted the Twelve Chapters of Cyril of Alexandria and ignored the Chalcedonian Definition. Though the Henotikon aimed to resolve the conflict surrounding the Chalcedon council's orthodoxy, it ultimately failed. Pope Felix III considered Acacius' slighting of Chalcedon and his predecessor Pope Leo I to be an affront to the prestige of his Holy See. Acacius was condemned and deposed by Pope Felix III, an action which was met with contempt by Acacius and resulted in a schism between the two sees, which continued after Acacius's death. The schism extended throughout the tumultuous reign of the Byzantine emperor Anastasius I Dicorus and was only resolved by emperor Justin I under Pope Hormisdas in 519.

The Coptic Orthodox Church celebrates The Departure of St. Acacius, Patriarch of Constantinople on the 30th of the Coptic month of Hathor.

== Early life and episcopate ==
Acacius first appearers in authentic history as the orphanotrophos, or an official entrusted with the care of the orphans, in the Church of Constantinople, which he administered with conspicuous success. Suda describes him as magnificent, generous, suave, noble, courtly, and showy.

The Roman emperor Leo I took notice of his abilities and, using the skills of an accomplished courtier, gained considerable influence over him, leading to his succession as Patriarch on the death of Gennadius of Constantinople in 471. The initial five to six years of his episcopate were unremarkable. However, he soon became embroiled in controversies which lasted throughout his patriarchate, culminating in a thirty-five-year (484–519) schism between the East and West churches.

He sought, first, to restore the unity of the Church, which had been divided by the divisions caused by the Eutychian debates; and, secondly, to increase the authority of his see by asserting its independence from Rome and extending its influence over Alexandria and Antioch. In terms of his actions, he seems to have behaved more like a statesman than a theologian.

== Chalcedonian controversy ==
=== Allied opposition against Basilicus and Timothy II of Alexandria ===
Acacius gained enthusiastic popular support and praise from Pope Simplicius due to his opposition to the usurped Roman emperor Basiliscus. Alongside the stylite monk, Daniel the Stylite, he led the opposition against the usurped emperor Basiliscus. Timothy II of Alexandria, the non-Chalcedonian patriarch of Alexandria under the protection of emperor Basiliscus since 476, had already induced Basiliscus to issue an encyclical or imperial proclamation (egkyklios) condemning the teaching of the Council of Chalcedon. Acacius initially hesitated to add his name to the list of Asiatic bishops who had previously signed the encyclical. However, he reconsidered this position and became actively involved in the debate after receiving a letter from Pope Simplicius. The pope had been alerted to Acacius' uncertain stance by the vigilant monastic party. This sudden change of allegiance improved his reputation among the public and gained him favour with the Chalcedonian faction, especially among the different monastic groups in the East, due to his overt commitment to sound doctrine. He even received a letter of endorsement from Pope Simplicius.

The main reason for Acacius' sudden surge in popularity was his skillful ability to lead the movement which Daniel the Stylite was both the leader and inspiration of. The uproar was undoubtedly spontaneous among the monastic promoters and the general public who genuinely abhorred Eutychian views on the Incarnation. However, it remains uncertain whether Acacius, who was now in opposition to the Chalcedonians, or later, in his attempts at compromise, was anything more complex than a politician trying to achieve his own personal ends. He lacked a consistent understanding of theological principles and had a gambler's mindset, playing solely for influence. Ultimately, Basiliscus was defeated.

Basiliscus retracted his offensive decree through a counter-proclamation, but his submission did not save him. Subsequently, the emperor Zeno, who was in exile until Acacius' opposition, regained the throne he had lost; and Basiliscus, after abject and futile concessions to the ecclesiastical power, was handed over to him (as tradition has it) by Acacius, having taken refuge in his church in 477. At this point, the relations between Zeno, Acacius and Simplicius seem to have been friendly. They agreed on the need to take vigorous measures to confirm the decrees of the Council of Chalcedon, and for a time they acted in unison.

=== Disputes over Peter III of Alexandria and John Talaia ===
In 479, Acacius consecrated the Patriarch of Antioch, thus exceeding the proper limits of his jurisdiction. Nevertheless, Pope Simplicius accepted the appointment, citing necessity.

Trouble erupted when the Non-Chalcedonian party of Alexandria tried to install Peter III of Alexandria as patriarch, instead of John Talaia, in 482. Simplicus objected to Peter III of Alexandria's appointment due to his affiliation with the Non-Chalcedonian party of Alexandria and declared his support for John Talaia.

Both candidates had notable drawbacks. Peter III had been a Non-Chalcedonian, and Talaia was bound by a solemn promise to the Emperor not to seek or (it would seem) accept the Patriarchate. Talaia immediately sought and obtained the support of Simplicius, and offended Acacius. Peter III assured Acacius that, if confirmed in his post, he would be able to heal the divisions caused by the dispute.

This occasion gave Acacius his long-awaited opportunity to claim honour and jurisdiction over the whole of the East, freeing the bishops of the capital from responsibility to the sees of Alexandria, Antioch, Jerusalem and the Roman Pontiff. Acacius, having fully won over Zeno, advised the emperor to support Peter III of Alexandria, despite Simplicius' strong opposition. Acacius then sent envoys to discuss the terms of reunion for all the churches of the East.

=== Henotikon Edict and the Acacian Schism ===
Shortly after, Acacius prepared a document or set of articles, which was at once a creed and an instrument of reunion, as his way of claiming jurisdiction over the whole of the East. This document, known to theologians as the Henotikon, was initially aimed at the opposing factions in Egypt, and was a call for reunion the grounds of restraint and compromise.

The Henotikon edict of 482 affirmed the Nicene-Constantinopolitan Creed (i.e. the Nicene Creed as completed at Constantinople) as the common, definitive and unified symbol or expression of faith. All other symbola or mathemata were rejected; Eutyches and Nestorius were unequivocally condemned in an anathema, while the Twelve Chapters of Cyril of Alexandria were accepted. The teachings of Chalcedon were not repudiated, but rather simply ignored; Jesus Christ was described as the "only-begotten Son of God ... one and not two", and there was no explicit reference to the two natures.

Peter III of Alexandria accepted the Henotikon and was confirmed in his position. John Talaia refused to accept it and withdrew to Rome, where his support was taken up with great vigour by letters from Pope Simplicius urging Acacius to control the spread of heresy elsewhere and in Alexandria. The letters were in vain, and Simplicius died soon afterwards.

His successor, Pope Felix III, zealously championed Talaia's cause and sent two bishops, Vitalis and Misenus, to Constantinople with letters to Zeno and Acacius, demanding that the latter return to Rome to answer the charges brought against him by Talaia (Felix, Epp. 1, 2). The mission completely failed. Vitalis and Misenus were persuaded to publicly communicate (i.e. receive Holy Communion) with Acacius and the representatives of Peter III. In shame, they returned to Italy in 484.

Upon their arrival in Rome, a synod convened and vehemently denounced their actions. They were subsequently deposed and excommunicated. Furthermore, a new anathema was issued against Peter III, and Acacius was irrevocably excommunicated for his association with Pierre III, for exceeding the limits of his jurisdiction, and for refusing to answer the charges of Talaia at Rome; but no direct heretical opinion was proved or urged against him. Acacius was condemned by Pope Felix for committing a sin against the Holy Spirit and apostolic authority (Habe ergo cum his ... portionem S. Spiritus judicio et apostolica auctoritate damnatus). He was subsequently subjected to perpetual excommunication (nunquamque anathematis vinculis exuendus).

Felix sent the sentence to Acacius, and at the same time wrote to Zeno and to the Church of Constantinople, ordering everyone to separate from the deposed Patriarch on pain of excommunication. Meanwhile, an additional envoy, Tutus, was appointed to personally deliver the decree of double excommunication to Acacius. Acacius declined to accept the documents presented by Tutus and demonstrated his defiance of the authority of the Roman See and the Synod that had condemned him by erasing Pope Felix's name from the diptychs. Despite the threats from Felix, there were hardly any practical consequences, as the majority of Eastern Christians continued to remain in communion with Acacius.

Talaia agreed to become Bishop of Nola, effectively conceding defeat; meanwhile, Zeno and Acacius actively pursued the widespread adoption of the Henotikon throughout the East. Some (probably biased) sources say that Acacius, together with Zeno, began a brutal policy of violence and persecution, directed mainly against his old opponents, the monks, in order to achieve the general acceptance of the Henotikon. The condemnation of Acacius made in the name of the Pope, was repeated in the name of the Council of Chalcedon, and the schism was complete in 485. Acacius disregarded the sentence to the day of his death in 489, which was followed by those of Mongus in 490 and Zeno in 491.

His successor, Fravitta of Constantinople, entered into negotiations with Felix during a very brief patriarchate, but to no avail. The policy of Acacius failed when he could no longer implement it. In a short span of years, all his efforts were undone. The Henotikon was unsuccessful in reestablishing unity in the East, and in 519, Byzantine emperor Justin I deferred to Pope Hormisdas, and the condemnation of Acacius was recognised by the Church of Constantinople.

== Bibliography ==
- Meyendorff, John (1989). Imperial unity and Christian divisions - The Church 450–680 AD. The Church in history. Vol. 2. Crestwood, NY: Saint Vladimir's Seminary Press. ISBN 978-0-88-141056-3.
- Dietmar W. Winkler: Acacius of Constantinople, David G. Hunter, Paul J. J. van Geest, Bert Jan Lietaert Peerbolte (eds.): Brill Encyclopedia of Early Christianity Online Acacius of Constantinople.

Titles of Chalcedonian Christianity
Preceded by Gennadius	Patriarch of Constantinople; 472 – 489	Succeeded by Fravitta
