= Patriarch John of Constantinople =

Patriarch John of Constantinople may refer to:

- Patriarch John I of Constantinople, Archbishop in 398–404
- Patriarch John II of Constantinople, Ecumenical Patriarch in 518–520
- Patriarch John III of Constantinople, Ecumenical Patriarch in 565–577
- Patriarch John IV of Constantinople, Ecumenical Patriarch in 582–595
- Patriarch John V of Constantinople, Ecumenical Patriarch in 669–675
- Patriarch John VI of Constantinople, Ecumenical Patriarch in 712–715
- Patriarch John VII of Constantinople, Ecumenical Patriarch in 837–843
- Patriarch John VIII of Constantinople, Ecumenical Patriarch in 1064–1075
- Patriarch John IX of Constantinople, Ecumenical Patriarch in 1111–1134
- Patriarch John X of Constantinople, Ecumenical Patriarch in 1198–1206
- Patriarch John XI of Constantinople, Ecumenical Patriarch in 1275–1282
- Patriarch John XII of Constantinople, Ecumenical Patriarch in 1294–1303
- Patriarch John XIII of Constantinople, Ecumenical Patriarch in 1315–1320
- Patriarch John XIV of Constantinople, Ecumenical Patriarch in 1334–1347
