= Proterius of Alexandria =

Patriarch of Alexandria from 451 to 457

Saint Proterius of Alexandria
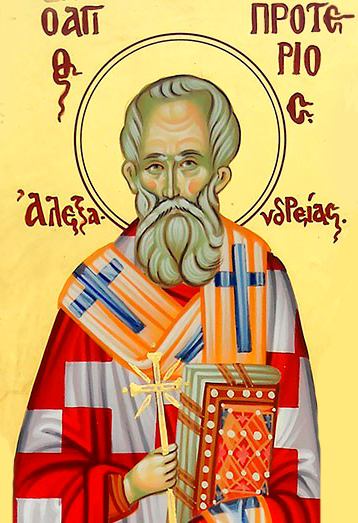
- Byzantine-rite icon of Proterius

Hieromartyr
- Died: 457; Alexandria
- Cause of death: Murder
- Venerated in: Eastern Orthodox Church; Catholic Church
- Feast: February 28

Pope Proterius of Alexandria (died 457) was Patriarch of Alexandria from 451 to 457. He had been appointed by the Council of Chalcedon to replace the deposed Dioscorus. He is regarded as hieromartyr by the Eastern Orthodox Church and the Catholic Church.

== History ==
Proterius was elected by the Council of Chalcedon in 451 to replace Dioscorus of Alexandria, who had been deposed as Patriarch by the same council. Upon his arrival in Alexandria, he was met by a riot.

His accession marks the beginning of the Schism of 451 between the Coptic Orthodox and the Greek Orthodox patriarchs of Alexandria, which has never been completely resolved. Because the church of Alexandria was largely anti-Chalcedonian, the deposition of Dioscorus, an anti-Chalcedonian, from the Patriarchate, and the elevation of Proterius, a Chalcedonian, to it, was violently opposed. Finally in 457 the anti-Chalcedonian party in Alexandria elected Timothy Aelurus as Patriarch of Alexandria, in opposition to Proterius, who was either subsequently martyred by a Coptic mob (Evagrius Scholasticus, 2, 8 ) or murdered by the Byzantine garrison in Alexandria (Zachariah of Mitylene, 4,1-3).

The murder was commented in several letters by groups of bishops from various Roman provinces (e.g. Galatia Prima) or larger regions to Byzantine emperor Leo I the Thracian (457–474).

== Veneration ==
He is regarded as a Saint by the Eastern Orthodox Church and the Catholic Church. He is not recognized as a Pope by the Coptic Orthodox, who instead recognize Dioscorus and Timothy as having been the legitimate Popes during this time. (Coptic Orthodox Church Network, Popes Chronology ).

== Sources ==
- Meyendorff, John (1989). Imperial unity and Christian divisions: The Church 450-680 A.D. The Church in history. Vol. 2. Crestwood, NY: St. Vladimir's Seminary Press. ISBN 9780881410563.
- Evans, J. A. S. (2002). The Age of Justinian: The Circumstances of Imperial Power. Taylor & Francis.
- Keough, Shawn W. J. (2011). "Episcopal Succession as Criterion of Communion: The Rise of Rival Episcopal Genealogies in Alexandria according to liberatus of Carthage". In Leemans, Johan; Van Nuffelen, Peter; Keough, Shawn W. J. (eds.). Episcopal Elections in Late Antiquity. De Gruyter. pp. 389–410.
- Wilde, Clare (2022). "The Qurʾānic Rūm: A Late Antique Perspective". In van den Bent, Josephine; van den Eijnde, Floris; Weststeijn, Johan (eds.). Late Antique Responses to the Arab Conquests. Brill. pp. 32–55.

Titles of the Great Christian Church
| Preceded by Dioscorus I | Greek Patriarch of Alexandria; 451–457 | Succeeded by Timothy II |
