= Christofer Ranzmaier =

Austrian politician (born 1987)

Member of the National Council
- Incumbent
- Assumed office 24 October 2024
- Constituency: Lowland

Personal details
- Born: 28 July 1987 (age 38)
- Party: Freedom Party

Christofer Ranzmaier (born 28 July 1987) is an Austrian politician of the Freedom Party. He has been a member of the National Council since 2024, and was a member of the Tyrolean Landtag from 2018 to 2022.
