= Simone Pizzuti =

Italian footballer

Personal information
- Date of birth: 28 July 1990 (age 36)
- Place of birth: Rome, Italy
- Height: 1.81 m (5 ft 11 1/2 in)
- Position: Defender

Team information
- Current team: Lecco

Youth career
- ?–2010: Mantova

Senior career*
Years	Team	Apps	(Gls)
2009–2010	Mantova	3	(0)
2010–	Lecco		
- * Club domestic league appearances and goals

Simone Pizzuti (born 28 July 1990) is an Italian footballer who plays for Lega Pro Seconda Divisione club Lecco.

== Biography ==
Born in Rome, Lazio, Pizzuti started his career with Lombardy club Mantova. After the club went bankrupt, he was signed by Lecco.

Pizzuti also played for feeder teams of Italy U21: for U21 Serie B team in an internal training match in November 2009 and U20 Lega Pro team in internal training match in September 2010.
