= 519 =

Calendar year

519 in various calendars
Gregorian calendar	519; DXIX
Ab urbe condita	1272
Assyrian calendar	5269
Balinese saka calendar	440–441
Bengali calendar	−75 – −74
Berber calendar	1469
Buddhist calendar	1063
Burmese calendar	−119
Byzantine calendar	6027–6028
Chinese calendar	戊戌年 (Earth Dog); 3216 or 3009 — to — 己亥年 (Earth Pig); 3217 or 3010
Coptic calendar	235–236
Discordian calendar	1685
Ethiopian calendar	511–512
Hebrew calendar	4279–4280
- Hindu calendars
Vikram Samvat	575–576
Shaka Samvat	440–441
Kali Yuga	3619–3620
Holocene calendar	10519
Iranian calendar	103 BP – 102 BP
Islamic calendar	106 BH – 105 BH
Javanese calendar	406–407
Julian calendar	519; DXIX
Korean calendar	2852
Minguo calendar	1393 before ROC 民前1393年
Nanakshahi calendar	−949
Seleucid era	830/831 AG
Thai solar calendar	1061–1062
Tibetan calendar	ས་ཕོ་ཁྱི་ལོ་ (male Earth-Dog); 645 or 264 or −508 — to — ས་མོ་ཕག་ལོ་ (female Earth-Boar); 646 or 265 or −507

Year 519 (DXIX) was a common year starting on Tuesday of the Julian calendar. At the time, it was known in the Roman Empire as the Year of the Consulship of Iustinus and Cillica (or, less frequently, year 1272 Ab urbe condita). The denomination 519 for this year has been used since the early medieval period, when the Anno Domini calendar era became the prevalent method in Europe for naming years.

== Events ==
=== By place ===
==== Britannia ====
- Cerdic becomes the first king of the Kingdom of Wessex.

==== Europe ====
- The synagogues of Ravenna are burnt down in a riot; Theodoric the Great orders them to be rebuilt at Ravenna's expense.
- August 28 – Theodoric's tricennium, a 30-year statute of limitations, after which unlawful seizures of land during his 489 invasion of Italy can no longer be contested, ends.

==== Asia ====
- Anjang becomes ruler of the Korean kingdom of Goguryeo.

=== By topic ===
==== Religion ====
- March 28 – The Eastern and Western churches reconcile their differences, ending the Acacian Schism.
- Jacob of Serugh becomes bishop of Batnan (near modern Diyarbakir, Turkey).
- The Memoirs of Eminent Monks is compiled.
- In Ireland, the Diocese of Kildare is erected.

== Births ==
- Xuan Di, emperor of the Liang Dynasty (d. 562)

== Deaths ==
- Munjamyeong of Goguryeo, 21st king of Goguryeo
