= Peter III of Alexandria =

Head of the Coptic Church from 477 to 489

Saint Peter III of Alexandria
- Pope of Alexandria and Patriarch of the See of St. Mark
- Papacy began: 477
- Papacy ended: 11 November 489
- Predecessor: Timothy II
- Successor: Athanasius II

Personal details
- Born: Egypt
- Died: 11 November 489
- Buried: Saint Mark's Church
- Denomination: Coptic Orthodox Christian
- Residence: Saint Mark's Church

Sainthood
- Feast day: 11 November (2 Hathor in the Coptic calendar)

Pope Peter III of Alexandria (d. 489) also known as Peter Mongus (from the Greek μογγός mongos, "stammerer") was the 27th Pope of Alexandria and Patriarch of the See of St. Mark.

== Biography ==
After the Council of Chalcedon, Peter Mongus was an ardent adherent of Miaphysitism and deacon of Timothy Aelurus. After Timothy expelled the Chalcedonian Patriarch Proterius in 457, Mongus took part in the persecution of the Chalcedonians.

When Timothy Aelurus, who had been expelled in 460 and returned in 475, died in 477, his followers elected Mongus to succeed him. However, the Byzantine Emperor Zeno brought Timothy Salophakiolos, a Chalcedonian who had supplanted Aelurus before in 460, back to Alexandria; he also sentenced Mongus to death.

Mongus escaped by flight and remained in hiding until 482. In the previous year, John Talaia had succeeded Timothy Salophakiolos as patriarch. However, as Talaia refused to sign Emperor Zeno's Henoticon (which glossed over the Council of Chalcedon), the emperor expelled him and recognized Mongus as the legitimate patriarch on the condition that he would sign the Henoticon. Mongus complied and after taking possession of the see, he signed the controversial document. Patriarch Acacius of Constantinople entered him into his diptych list as patriarch of Alexandria.

Talaia had meanwhile fled to Rome, where he was welcomed by Pope Simplicius and his successor Pope Felix III, who refused to recognize Mongus and defended Talaia's rights in two letters to Acacius. As Acacius maintained the Henoticon and communion with Mongus, the pope excommunicated the patriarchs in 484. This Acacian schism lasted until 519.

Mongus became the chief champion of all Miaphysites. He held a synod to condemn Chalcedon. He also desecrated the tombs of his two Chalcedonian predecessors Proterios and Timothy Salophakiolos. When Acacius died in 489, Mongus encouraged his successor Fravitta to maintain the schism with Rome. Fravitta's successor Euphemius sought to heal the schism by excommunicating Mongus.

Mongus died soon afterwards and was succeeded by Athanasius II.

== Works ==
He is said to have written many books, of which however nothing remains. A pretended correspondence between him and Acacius (in Coptic) is proved to be spurious by Amélineau in the "Memoires publiés par les membres de la mission archéologique française au Caire", IV (Paris, 1888), 196–228.

Evagrius has preserved the letter which Mongus wrote to Acacius in 482—this is the only writing of Mongus still in existence.

== Bibliography ==
- Meyendorff, John (1989). Imperial unity and Christian divisions: The Church 450-680 A.D. The Church in history. Vol. 2. Crestwood, New York: St. Vladimir's Seminary Press. ISBN 978-0-88141-056-3.
- Herbermann, Charles, ed. (1913). "Peter Mongus". Catholic Encyclopedia. New York: Robert Appleton Company.
- "Peter Mongo" in: The Oxford Dictionary of the Christian Church., F. L. Cross and E. A. Livingstone (ed.), London: Oxford University Press, 1974, p. 1074.

Preceded by Timothy II Aelurus	Patriarch of Alexandria; 477	Succeeded by Timothy III Salophakiolos
Preceded by Timothy II Aelurus	Coptic Pope; 477–490	Succeeded by Athanasius II
Preceded by John Talaia	Patriarch of Alexandria; 482–490	Succeeded by Athanasius II
