= Pope Simplicius =

Head of the Catholic Church from 468 to 483

Pope Saint Simplicius
- Bishop of Rome
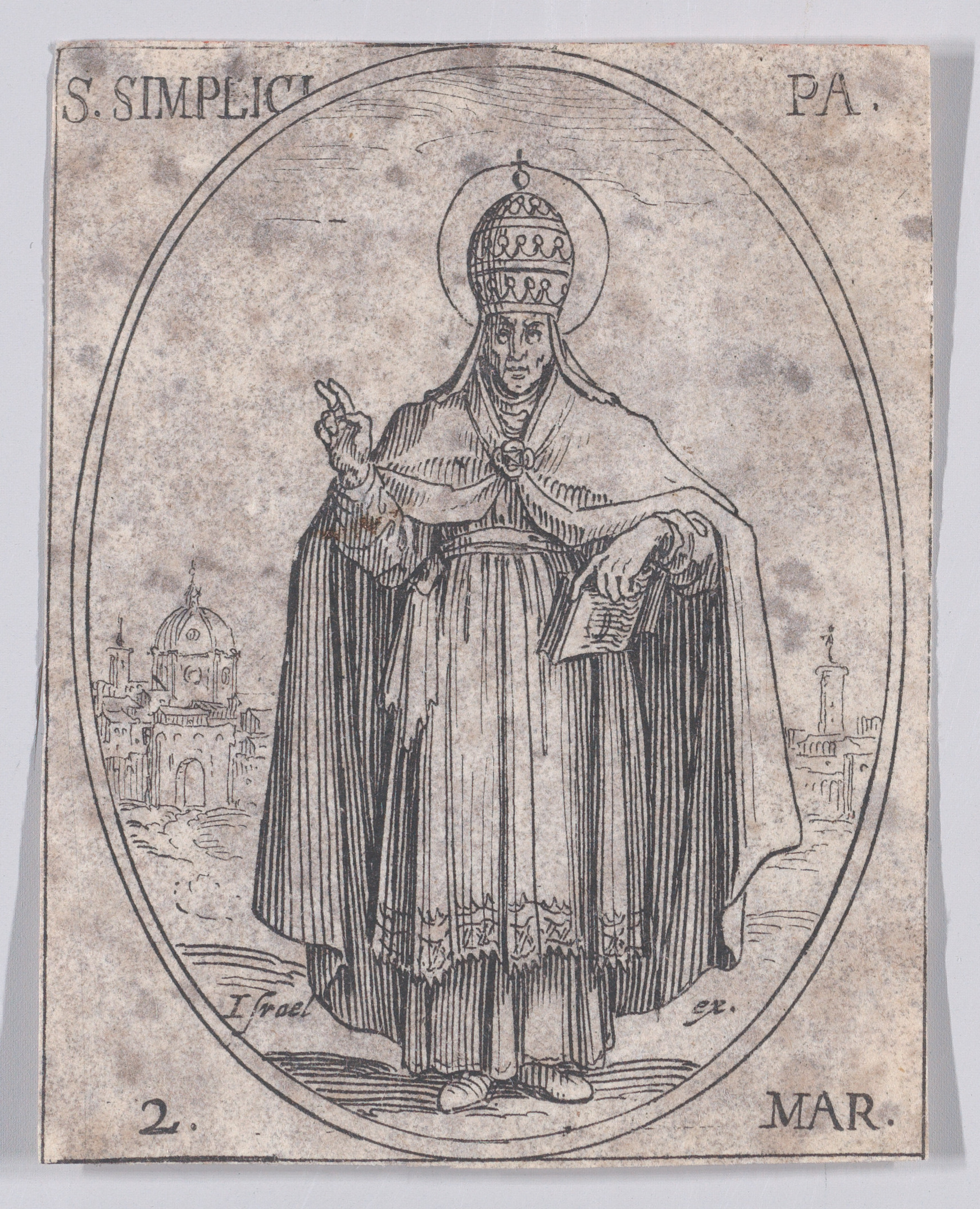
- Etching of Pope Simplicius, 1636
- Church: Catholic Church
- Papacy began: 25 February 468
- Papacy ended: 2 or 10 March 483
- Predecessor: Hilarius
- Successor: Felix III

Personal details
- Born: between 395 and 433 Tivoli, Western Roman Empire
- Died: 2 or 10 March 483 Rome, Kingdom of Odoacer

Sainthood
- Feast day: 10 March
- Venerated in: Orthodox, Catholic

Pope Simplicius (died 2 or 10 March 483) was the bishop of Rome from 468 to his death on 10 March 483. He combated the Eutychian heresy, ended the practice of consecrating bishops only in December, and sought to offset the effects of Germanic invasions. His pontificate coincided with the fall of the Western Roman Empire in 476, when Odoacer deposed the last Western Roman emperor, Romulus Augustulus, though it had little impact on the Church's administration of Rome.

== Election ==
Simplicius was born in Tivoli, Italy, the son of a citizen named Castinus. After a vacancy of 10 days following the death of Pope Hilarius, Simplicius was consecrated on 25 February 468.

== Pontificate ==
Simplicius defended the decisions of the Council of Chalcedon against the Eutychian heresy. When the Eutychians rose up in Antioch and installed Petrus Mongus, Simplicius made repeated complaints for action to Basiliscus and Leo I, emperors of the Eastern Roman Empire, for the restoration of the Catholic bishop; he did the same when Petrus Fullo usurped the seat of the patriarch of Alexandria. He rehabilitated Patriarch Timotheos Solofaciolus.

In 476, he saw the Heruliian mercenaries revolt, depose Romulus Augustulus, the last emperor of the Western Roman Empire, and proclaim Odoacer king of Italy. Odoacer made few changes in the administration in Rome, leaving the city firmly in the hands of its bishop, Simplicius.

In 478, Simplicius held a synod in Rome, which pronounced anathemas against eastern heretical bishops Peter Fullo, John of Apamea, and Paul of Ephesus. Simplicius worked to maintain the authority of Rome in the West. He named Zeno, Bishop of Hispalis (Seville) as Papal Vicar in Spain.

In 482, Bishop Gregory of Modena was consecrated a bishop against his will by Archbishop Joannes I of Ravenna. This brought the archbishop a sharp rebuke from Pope Simplicius.

According to the Carolingian liturgist Amalarius of Metz, Pope Simplicius was the first pope to carry out consecrations at any other time than in December before Christmas. He began to confer holy orders in February as well.

Simplicius is credited with the construction of a church named Santa Bibiana, in memory of the virgin and martyr St. Bibiana. He also dedicated the Church of Santo Stefano Rotondo on the Celian Hill, the church of S. Andrea near S. Maria Maggiore, and a church dedicated to Saint Lawrence in the Campo Verano. He labored to help the people of Italy against the marauding raids of barbarian invaders.

== Death and aftermath ==
He was buried in the Basilica of St. Peter on 2 March 483. Rome was without a pope for six days. Since 1971, St. Simplicius's feast day is celebrated on 10 March in the General Roman Calendar of the Catholic Church.

== See also ==
- List of Catholic saints
- List of popes

== Sources ==
- Duchesne, Louis (1886). Le Liber pontificalis (in Latin). Vol. Tome premier. Paris: E. Thorin. pp. 249–251.
- Jaffe, Philippus; Loewenfeld, S. (1885). Regesta pontificum romanorum ab condita ecclesia ad annum post Christum natum MCXCVIII (in Latin). Vol. Tomus primus (secunda ed.). Leipzig: Veit. pp. 77–80.
- Loomis, Louise Ropes, ed. (1916). The Book of the Popes (Liber Pontificalis). Records of Civilization: Sources and Studies. Vol. I. To the pontificate of Gregory I. New York: Columbia University Press. pp. 105–107.
- Opera Omnia, edited by J.-P. Migne, Patrologia Latina, with analytical indexes. This link also holds the "Vita Operaque" section of the Liber Pontificalis.
- Pennacchio, Maria Cristina (2000). "Simplicio, santo". Enciclopedia dei Papi (2000). (in Italian)
- "S. Simplicii papae Epistolae et decreta," in: Thiel, Andreas (1868). Epistolae Romanorum pontificum genuinae et quae ad eos scriptae sunt, a s. Hilario usque ad Pelagium II (in Latin). Vol. I. Brunsbergae: Peter. pp. 174–220.

Catholic Church titles
Preceded by Hilarius	Pope; 468–483	Succeeded by Felix III
