= Henotikon =

Christological document issued by Byzantine emperor Zeno in 482

The Henotikon (/həˈnɒtɪkən, həˈnɒtɪkɒn/; Ancient Greek: ἑνωτικόν henōtikón "act of union") was a Christological document issued by Byzantine emperor Zeno in 482, in an unsuccessful attempt to reconcile the differences between the supporters of the Council of Chalcedon and the council's opponents (Non-Chalcedonian Christians). It was followed by the Acacian schism. It was suppressed in 518.

== History ==
In 451, the Council of Chalcedon settled Christological disputes by condemning both Monophysitism, held by Eutyches, and Nestorianism. However, large sections of the Eastern Roman Empire, especially in Egypt, but also in Palestine and Syria, held miaphysite views. In order to restore unity, the Patriarch of Constantinople, Acacius, devised an irenic formula, which Emperor Zeno promulgated without the approval of a synod of bishops. The Henotikon endorsed the condemnations of Eutyches and Nestorius made at Chalcedon and explicitly approved the twelve anathemas of Cyril of Alexandria. It avoided any definitive statement on whether Christ had one or two natures, attempting to appease both sides of the dispute.

This act failed to satisfy either side. All sides took offence at the Emperor openly dictating church doctrine, although the Patriarch of Antioch was pressured into subscribing to the Henotikon. When Patriarch John I of Alexandria refused, the Emperor had him expelled and instead recognized the miaphysite Peter Mongos, who accepted the Henotikon. However, other miaphysites abandoned Mongos and were thenceforth called Akephaloi (headless ones), since they had lost their leader. After two years of prevarication and temporizing by Acacius, Pope Felix III of Rome condemned the act and excommunicated Acacius (484), although this was largely ignored in Constantinople, even after the death of Acacius in 489.

Zeno died in 491. His successor Anastasius I was sympathetic to the miaphysites, and accepted the Henotikon. However, Anastasius's position was at odds with the predominantly Chalcedonian population of Constantinople, and Vitalian, a Chalcedonian general, attempted to overthrow him in 514. Anastasius then attempted to heal the schism with Pope Hormisdas, but this failed when Anastasius refused to recognize the excommunication of the now deceased Acacius. Vitalian tried to overthrow the emperor a second time, but he was defeated by loyal officers.

By 518, support for the Henotikon had faded almost to extinction.

The schism caused by the Henotikon was officially settled in 519 when Emperor Justin I recognized the excommunication of Acacius and reunited the Chalcedonian churches. However, the then-Patriarchs of Alexandria and Antioch still embraced miaphysitism, and their churches came to be known in modern times as the Oriental Orthodox Churches. Meanwhile, the incident did nothing to mend the growing rift between the churches of Constantinople and Rome, which would lead in later centuries to the East–West Schism.

== See also ==
- Christology
- Hypostatic union

== Bibliography ==
- Bury, John B. (2016) [1958]. History of the Later Roman Empire: from the death of Theodosius I to the death of Justinian. Vol. 1. Dover Publications. ISBN 978-0-486-20398-0.
- Cameron, Averil; Bryan Ward-Perkins; Michael Whitby (2000). Late Antiquity. ISBN 978-0-521-32591-2.
- Kötter, Jan-Markus (2013). Zwischen Kaisern und Aposteln. Das Akakianische Schisma (485-519) als kirchlicher Ordnungskonflikt der Spätantike. Franz Steiner Verlag. ISBN 978-3-5151-0389-3.
- Meyendorff, John (1989). Imperial unity and Christian divisions: The Church 450-680 A.D. The Church in history. Vol. 2. Crestwood, NY: St. Vladimir's Seminary Press. ISBN 9780881410563.
- Ostrogorsky, George (1956). History of the Byzantine State. Oxford: Basil Blackwell.
- Richards, Jeffrey (1979). The Popes and the Papacy in the Early Middle Ages, 476–752. Routledge & Kegan Paul. ISBN 978-0-7100-0098-9.
