= Pope John II (III) of Alexandria =

Head of the Coptic Church from 505 to 516

Pope John II of Alexandria
- Pope of Alexandria & Patriarch of the See of St. Mark
- Papacy began: 29 May 505
- Papacy ended: 22 May 516
- Predecessor: John I
- Successor: Dioscorus II

Personal details
- Born: Nicius, Egypt
- Died: 22 May 516 Egypt
- Buried: Saint Mark's Church
- Denomination: Coptic Orthodox Christian
- Residence: Saint Mark's Church

Pope John II (III) of Alexandria, was the 30th Pope of Alexandria & Patriarch of the See of St. Mark.

He is counted as John III by the Eastern Orthodox Church, which acknowledges John Talaia as John I, but as John II by the Copts who reject Talaia. He is sometimes called John Niciota after his birthplace of Nicius.

He was a monk who lived a solitary life in the desert until he was consecrated Pope and Patriarch of Alexandria on 29 May 505.

He was famous for authoring many hagiographical writings and sermons.

He was a contemporary of the Roman Emperor Anastasius I, who favoured the non-Chalcedonian churches, and of Severus of Antioch, the champion of Miaphysitism in Syria. The latter wrote a message to John regarding the nature of Christ, which reads:

Jesus Christ, after the union with flesh, has become of one Nature with one Will without separation, and I believe in the same faith of Pope Cyril and Pope Dioscorus.

John replied with a message that testified to the union of the essence of God, and the trinity of His characters. He also proclaimed that by the incarnation of the eternal Son of God, the Divine and the human nature have become one and no longer two natures, without separation, mingling, or confusion. He anathematized those who separate the two natures, those who confuse them and those who said that the suffering crucified Christ was only a man, and those who say that His Divine nature also suffered and died. He said that the Orthodox faith was to profess that God the word suffered by the flesh with which he was united.

Preceded by John I (II)	Coptic Pope; 505–516	Succeeded by Dioscorus II
Preceded by John I (II)	Patriarch of Alexandria; 505–516	Succeeded by Dioscorus II
