= Pope Felix III =

Head of the Catholic Church from 483 to 492

Pope Saint Felix III
- Bishop of Rome
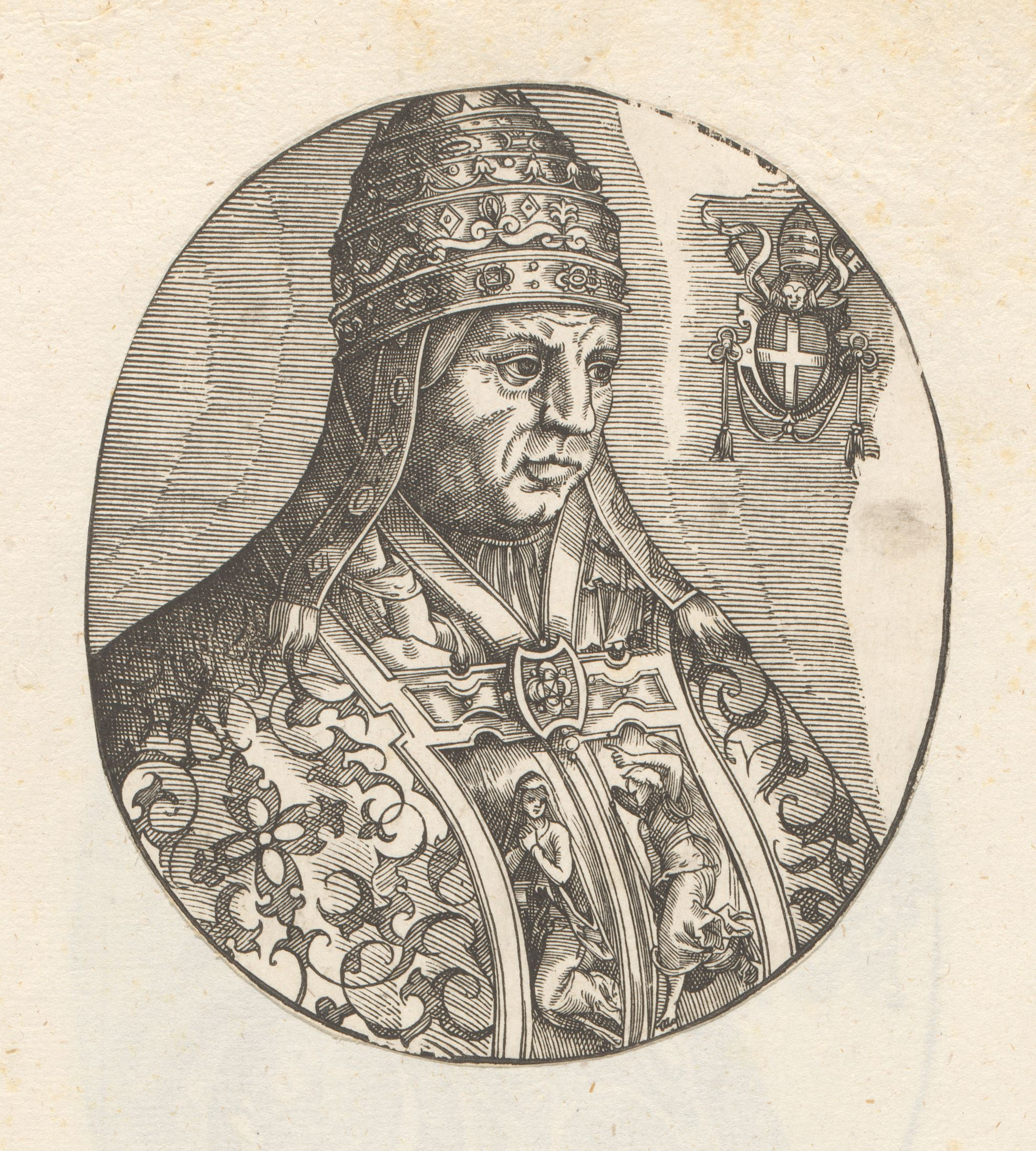
- Woodcut of Felix III, c. 1549-1573
- Church: Catholic Church
- Papacy began: 13 March 483
- Papacy ended: 1 March 492
- Predecessor: Simplicius
- Successor: Gelasius I

Personal details
- Born: Rome, Italy, Western Roman Empire
- Died: 1 March 492 Rome, Kingdom of Odoacer
- Spouse: name unknown

Sainthood
- Venerated in: Catholic Church; Eastern Orthodox Church

Pope Felix III (died 1 March 492) was the bishop of Rome from 13 March 483 to his death on 1 March 492. His repudiation of the Henotikon is considered the beginning of the Acacian schism. He is commemorated on 1 March.

== Family ==
Felix was born into a Roman senatorial family – possibly the son of a priest. He was married and widowed before he was elected as pope. He fathered two children, and through his son Gordianus (a priest) was thought to be great-great-grandfather to Pope Gregory I, and possibly related to Pope Agapetus I.

It was also said that Felix appeared as an apparition to another of his descendants, his great-granddaughter Trasilla (an aunt of Pope Gregory I), and asked her to enter Heaven, and "on the eve of Christmas Trasilla died, seeing Jesus Christ beckoning".

== Eutychian heresy ==
Eutyches was an archimandrite at Constantinople. In his opposition to Nestorianism, he seemed to have taken the opposite view to extremes. In an effort to defuse controversy regarding the teachings of Eutyches, in 482 Emperor Zeno, at the suggestion of Patriarch Acacius of Constantinople, had issued an edict known as the Henotikon. The edict was intended as a bond of reconciliation between Catholics and Eutychians, but it caused greater conflicts than ever, and split the Church of the East into three or four parties. The Henotikon endorsed the condemnations of Eutyches and Nestorius made at Chalcedon and explicitly approved the twelve anathemas of Cyril of Alexandria, but in attempting to appease both sides of the dispute, avoided any definitive statement on whether Christ had one or two natures.

Felix's first act was to repudiate the Henotikon. He also addressed a letter of remonstrance to Acacius. The latter proved refractory and sentence of deposition was passed against Acacius.

As Catholics spurned Zeno's edict, the emperor had driven the patriarchs of Antioch and Alexandria from their sees. Peter the Fuller deposed Martyrius of Antioch and assumed the See of Antioch in 470. Peter Mongus took the See of Alexandria. In his first synod, Felix excommunicated Peter the Fuller. In 484, Felix also excommunicated Peter Mongus, an act that brought about a schism between East and West that was not healed until 519.

== Aftermath of the Vandals ==
In North Africa, conquered by the fervently Arian Vandals, persecution by king Genseric and his son and successor Huneric had driven many Catholic Romans into exile. When Huneric died, the persecutions were eased, and many of those who through fear had been rebaptized as Arians desired to return to the Church. However, the Vandals remained resolutely Arian. The Catholics appealed to Felix, who convened a synod in 487 and sent a letter to the bishops of Africa, expounding the conditions under which the unwilling apostates were to be taken back.

== See also ==
- List of popes

== Sources ==
- Friedrich Wilhelm Bautz (1990). "Felix II.". In Bautz, Friedrich Wilhelm (ed.). Biographisch-Bibliographisches Kirchenlexikon (BBKL) (in German). Vol. 2. Hamm: Bautz. col. 10. ISBN 3-88309-032-8.

Catholic Church titles
| Preceded by Simplicius | Pope; 483–492 | Succeeded by Gelasius I |
