= Timothy II of Alexandria =

Head of the Coptic Church from 457 to 477

Saint Timothy II of Alexandria
- Pope of Alexandria & Patriarch of the See of St. Mark
- Papacy began: 457
- Papacy ended: 31 July 477
- Predecessor: Dioscorus the Great
- Successor: Peter III

Personal details
- Born: Egypt
- Died: 31 July 477
- Buried: Saint Mark's Church
- Denomination: Coptic Orthodox Christian
- Residence: Saint Mark's Church

Sainthood
- Feast day: 31 July Julian calendar (7 Mesra in the Coptic calendar)
- Venerated in: Coptic Orthodox Church and Syriac Orthodox Church

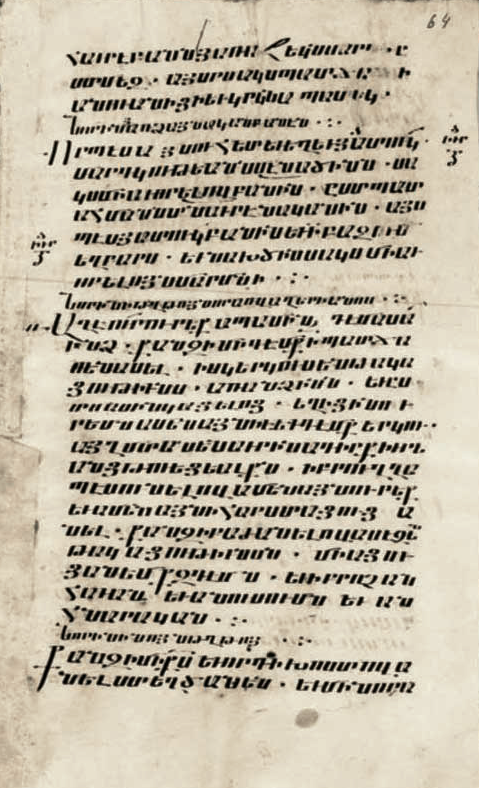
10th century Armenian translation of the writings of Timothy Ailuros

Pope Timothy II of Alexandria (died 477), also known as Timothy Ailuros or Timotheus Ælurus (from Greek Αἴλουρος, "cat", because of his small build or in this case probably "weasel"), succeeded twice in supplanting the Chalcedonian patriarch of Alexandria.

Before he became a bishop, Timothy was a monk at the Eikoston. He was elected and consecrated after the death of the exiled Dioscorus of Alexandria in 454 by the Miaphysite opponents of the Council of Chalcedon and became a rival of the pro-Chalcedon bishop Proterius.

According to pro-Chalcedon sources, after Proterius of Alexandria was installed as patriarch after the Council of Chalcedon, he was murdered at Timothy's instigation at the baptistery during Easter. In the Anti-Chalcedon Sources, Proterius was murdered on the order of the Byzantine General in Charge of Egypt after a heated exchange

In 460, Emperor Leo I expelled him from Alexandria and installed the Chalcedonian Timothy III Salophakiolos as patriarch.

In 475, Timothy was brought back to Alexandria by Basiliscus, where he ruled as patriarch until his death. According to John of Nikiu, the emperor Zeno sent an officer to summon him, but when the officer arrived, Timothy told him "The emperor will not see my face" and immediately fell ill and died.

Timothy gave his name to the sect of Christians who came to be known as the Timotheans, or alternatively, the sect of Ælurus.

== Sources ==
- Meyendorff, John (1989). Imperial unity and Christian divisions: The Church 450-680 A.D. The Church in history. Vol. 2. Crestwood, New York: St. Vladimir's Seminary Press. ISBN 9780881410563.
- البابا تيموثاوس الثاني [Pope Timothy II] (in Arabic). Official website of St. Takla Haymanot's Church.

Religious titles
Preceded by Dioscorus I	Coptic Pope; 454–477	Succeeded by Peter III
