= Acacian schism =

Schism (484–519) between Eastern and Western Christianity

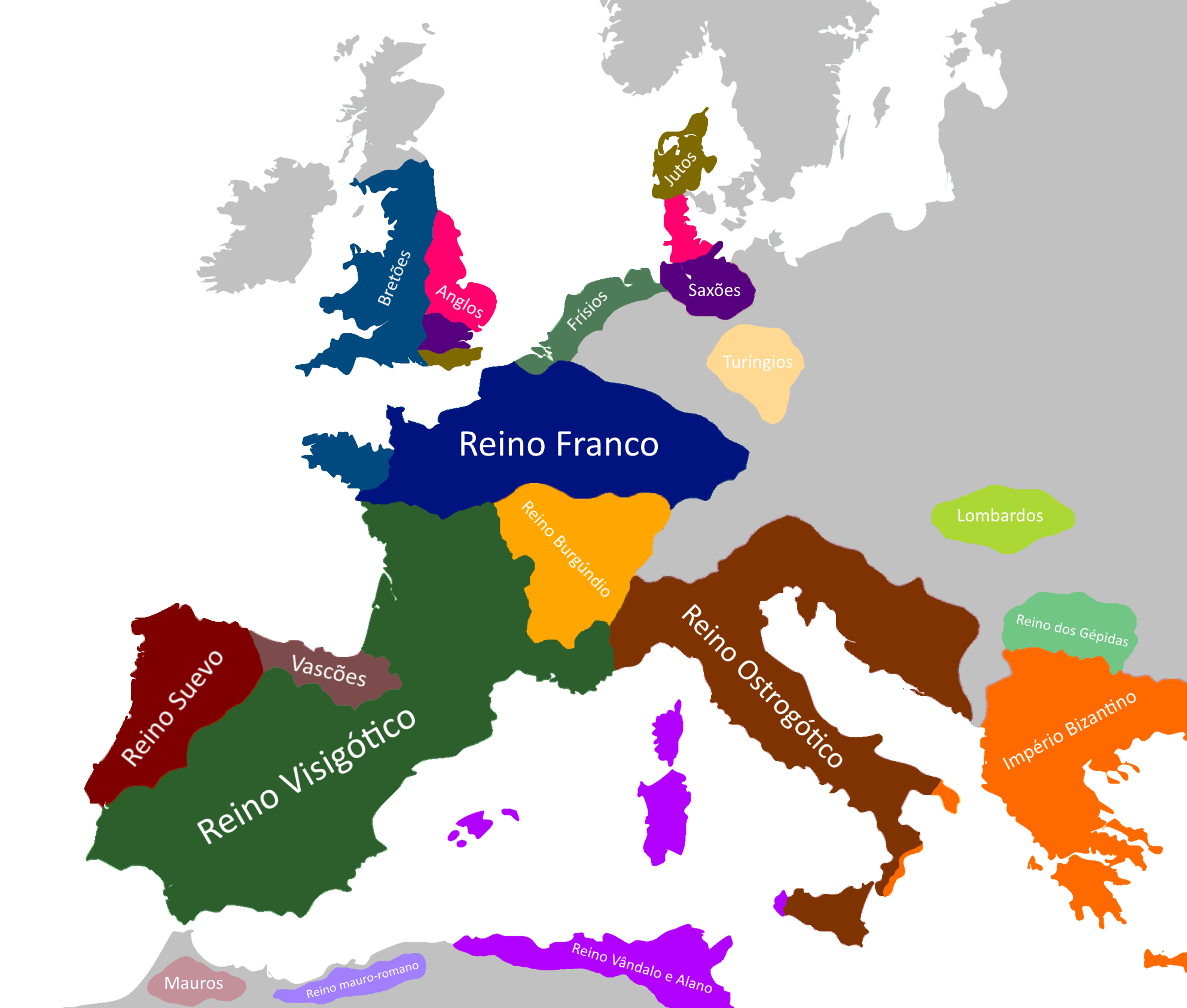
Europe c. 500 AD, in the midst of the schism (in Portuguese). Western Europe was loyal to the Bishop of Rome (then Pope Symmachus).

The Acacian schism, between the Eastern and Western Christian Churches, lasted 35 years, from 484 to 519. It resulted from a drift in the leaders of Eastern Christianity toward Miaphysitism and Emperor Zeno's unsuccessful attempt to reconcile the parties with the Henotikon. The events are described in letters in the Collectio Avellana.

In the events leading up to the schism, Pope Felix III wrote two letters, one to Emperor Zeno and one to Patriarch Acacius of Constantinople, reminding them of the need to defend the faith without compromise, as they had done previously. When former patriarch John Talaia, exiled from Alexandria, arrived in Rome and reported on what was happening in the East, Felix wrote two more letters, summoning Acacius to Rome to explain his conduct. The legates who brought these letters to Constantinople were imprisoned as soon as they landed and forced to receive communion from Acacius as part of a liturgy in which they heard Peter Mongus and other Miaphysites named in the diptychs. Felix, having heard of this from the Acoemetae monks in Constantinople, held a synod in 484 in which he denounced his legates and deposed and excommunicated Acacius.

Acacius replied to this act by striking Felix's name from his diptychs. Only the Acoemetae in Constantinople stayed loyal to Rome, and Acacius put their abbot, Cyril, in prison. Acacius died in 489, and his successor Flavitas tried to reconcile himself with Rome but refused to give up communion with Miaphysites and to omit Acacius' name in his diptychs. Felix's successor Gelasius also refused any compromise as a betrayal of the Council of Chalcedon.

Zeno died in 491; his successor Anastasius I Dicorus began by keeping the policy of the Henotikon, though he was a Miaphysite. After Anastasius' death, his successor Justin I immediately sought to end the schism with Rome, a goal shared by the new Patriarch of Constantinople, John of Cappadocia. A papal legation under Germanus of Capua was sent to Constantinople. The reunion was formalized on Easter, March 24, 519.

== Bibliography ==
- Meyendorff, John (1989). Imperial unity and Christian divisions: The Church 450–680 A.D. The Church in history. Vol. 2. Crestwood, NY: St. Vladimir's Seminary Press. ISBN 978-0-88-141056-3.
- Oden, Thomas C. (2008). How Africa Shaped the Christian Mind: Rediscovering the African Seedbed of Western Christianity. IVP Books. p. 204. ISBN 978-0-8308-2875-3.
- Cristini, Marco (2020). ‘In ecclesiae redintegranda unitate: re Teoderico e la fine dello Scisma Acaciano’, Rivista di Storia della Chiesa in Italia 73 (2019): 367–86.
- Dietmar W. Winkler. ‘Acacius of Constantinople’, in Brill Encyclopedia of Early Christianity Online. Eds. David G. Hunter, Paul J.J. van Geest, & Bert Jan Lietaert Peerbolte.
