= Pope John I of Alexandria =

Head of the Coptic Church from 496 to 505

- Pope of Alexandria and Patriarch of the See of St. Mark
- Papacy began: 29 September 496
- Papacy ended: 29 April 505
- Predecessor: Athanasius II
- Successor: John II

Personal details
- Born: Alexandria, Egypt
- Died: 29 April 505 Egypt
- Buried: Saint Mark's Church
- Denomination: Coptic Orthodox Christian
- Residence: Saint Mark's Church

Pope John I of Alexandria, (d. 505), was the 29th Coptic Pope of Alexandria and Patriarch of the See of St. Mark.

He is counted as John II by the Eastern Orthodox Church, which acknowledges John Talaia as John I. However, he is counted as John I by the Copts who reject Talaia.

John was born in Alexandria to Christian parents. He became a monk in the Nitrian Desert, at the Monastery of Saint Macarius the Great.

Against his will, he was consecrated Pope and Patriarch of Alexandria on 29 September 496, following the death of Athanasius II. He was the first Alexandrine bishop to be chosen from among the monks from the desert monasteries rather than from the learned clergy of Alexandria. He reigned for eight years and seven months.

During his time as patriarch, he is recorded as having secured gifts of wheat, wine, and oil for his former monastery from the Emperor.

He was a firm opponent of the Council of Chalcedon and held communion with those who accepted the Henotikon of Emperor Zeno without imposing a formal anathema on Chalcedon. By doing so, he largely kept the church in peace, although also continuing the schism of the Acephaloi, who opposed both the Council of Chalcedon and the conciliatory approach of the Henotikon.

During his time as patriarch, the Patriarch of Constantinople cut its ties with the Church of Alexandria.

He is commemorated in the Calendar of Saints of the Coptic Church on the 4th day of Pashons, the day of his death.

Preceded by Athanasius II	Coptic Pope; 496–505	Succeeded by John II (III)
Preceded by Athanasius II	Patriarch of Alexandria; 496–505	Succeeded by John II (III)
