= Timothy Salophakiolos =

5th-century Greek patriarch of Alexandria

Timothy III (died 481), called Salophakiolos ("wobble cap"), was the patriarch of Alexandria from 460 until 475 and again from 477 until his death. He was an adherent of the Council of Chalcedon and opponent of Monophysitism. As such, he is not recognized by the Coptic Church, which considers Timothy IV to be Timothy III.

In 460, the Emperor expelled the Miaphysite Patriarch Timothy Aelurus from Alexandria and installed the Chalcedonian Timothy Salophakiolos as patriarch.

In 475, a rebellion brought about the return of Timothy Aelurus but he died only two years later in 477. The Emperor expelled his chosen successor Peter Mongus and restored Salophakiolos to his see. He retained the see until his death in 481.

He was succeeded by John Talaia.

== Sources ==
- Meyendorff, John (1989). Imperial unity and Christian divisions: The Church 450-680 A.D. The Church in history. Vol. 2. Crestwood, NY: St. Vladimir's Seminary Press.
- "Timotheos III, Salophakiolus (460–482)". Official web site of the Greek Orthodox Patriarchate of Alexandria and All Africa.

Preceded by Timothy II Aelurus	Patriarch of Alexandria; 460–475	Succeeded by Timothy II Aelurus
Preceded by Peter III	Patriarch of Alexandria; 477–481	Succeeded by John Talaia
