= John Talaia =

5th-century Greek patriarch of Alexandria

- Installed: 481
- Term ended: 482

John Talaia was patriarch of Alexandria from 481 until 482. He was consecrated in 481, succeeding Timothy III Salophakiolos.

Talaia was a convinced adherent of the Council of Chalcedon and refused to sign Emperor Zeno's Henoticon (which glossed over the Council of Chalcedon). Because of this, the Emperor expelled him and recognized the Miaphysite claimant Peter Mongus as the legitimate patriarch on the condition that he would sign the Henoticon. Mongus complied and was recognized by the patriarchs of Antioch and Constantinople.

Talaia fled to Rome, where he was welcomed by Pope Simplicius. This pope, or his successor Felix III, refused to recognize Mongus and defended Talaia's rights in a letter to Acacius of Constantinople. As Acacius maintained the Henoticon and communion with Mongus, the pope excommunicated the patriarchs in 484. This Acacian schism lasted until 519.

Talaia eventually relinquished his claim to the see of Alexandria and became Bishop of Nola. Mongus served as Patriarch until his death in 589.

== Sources ==
- Meyendorff, John (1989). Imperial unity and Christian divisions: The Church 450-680 A.D. The Church in history. Vol. 2. Crestwood, NY: St. Vladimir's Seminary Press.
- "John I, Talaias (482)". Official web site of the Greek Orthodox Patriarchate of Alexandria and All Africa.

| Preceded by Timothy III Salophakiolos | Patriarch of Alexandria; 481–482 | Succeeded by Peter III Mongus |
