= List of 6th-century religious leaders =

This is a list of the top-level leaders for religious groups with at least 50,000 adherents, and that led anytime from January 1, 501, to December 31, 600. It should likewise only name leaders listed on other articles and lists.

== Christianity ==
- Church of Rome (complete list) –

- Symmachus, Pope (498–514)
- Hormisdas, Pope (514–523)
- John I, Pope (523–526)
- Felix IV, Pope (526–530)
- Boniface II, Pope (530–532)
- John II, Pope (533–535)
- Agapetus I, Pope (535–536)
- Silverius, Pope (536–537)
- Vigilius, Pope (537–555)
- Pelagius I, Pope (556–561)
- John III, Pope (561–574)
- Benedict I, Pope (575–579)
- Pelagius II, Pope (579–590)
- Gregory I the Great, Pope (590–604)

- Church of Constantinople (complete list) –

- Macedonius II, Patriarch of Constantinople (495–511)
- Timothy I, Patriarch of Constantinople (511–518)
- John II the Cappadocian, Patriarch of Constantinople (518–520)
- Epiphanius, Patriarch of Constantinople (520–535)
- Anthimus I, Patriarch of Constantinople (535–536)
- Menas, Patriarch of Constantinople (536–552)
- Eutychius, Patriarch of Constantinople (552–565, 577–582)
- John III Scholasticus, Patriarch of Constantinople (565–577)
- Eutychius, Patriarch of Constantinople (552–565, 577–582)
- John IV Nesteutes, Patriarch of Constantinople (582–595)
- Cyriacus, Patriarch of Constantinople (596–606)

- Church of Alexandria (complete list) –

- John II the Monk, Patriarch of Alexandria (496–505)
- John III, Patriarch of Alexandria (505–516)
- Dioscorus II, Patriarch of Alexandria (516–517)
- Timothy IV, Patriarch of Alexandria (517–535)
- Theodosius I, Patriarch of Alexandria (535–536)
- Paul, Patriarch of Alexandria (536–540)
- Zoilus, Patriarch of Alexandria (541–551)
- Apollinarius, Patriarch of Alexandria (551–569)
- John IV, Patriarch of Alexandria (569–579)
- Eulogius, Patriarch of Alexandria (580–608)

- Church of Antioch (complete list) –

- Flavian II, Patriarch of Antioch (498–512)
- Severus, Patriarch of Antioch (512–518)
- Paul II, Patriarch of Antioch (518–521)
- Euphrasius, Patriarch of Antioch (521–528)
- Ephrem, Patriarch of Antioch (528–546)
- Domnus III, Patriarch of Antioch (546–561)
- Anastasius I, Patriarch of Antioch (561–571, 594–599)
- Gregory, Patriarch of Antioch (571–594)
- Anastasius I, Patriarch of Antioch (561–571, 594–599)
- Anastasius II, Patriarch of Antioch (599–610)

- Church of Jerusalem –

- Elias I, Patriarch of Jerusalem (494–516)
- John III, Patriarch of Jerusalem (516–524)
- Peter, Patriarch of Jerusalem (524–552)
- Macarius II, Patriarch of Jerusalem (552, 564–575)
- Eustochius, Patriarch of Jerusalem (552–564)
- John IV, Patriarch of Jerusalem (575–594)
- Amos, Patriarch of Jerusalem (594–601)

== Judaism ==
=== Rabbinic Judaism ===
- Exilarch (complete list) –

- Mar-Zutra II, Exilarch (483–502/520)

- Pumbedita Academy (complete list) –

- Rabbah Jose, Dean (476–514)
- Simuna, Dean (?–540)
- Rabbai of Rob, Dean (540–?)
- Hanan of Iskiya, Dean (589–608)

- Sura Academy (complete list) –

- Rav Ena, Dean (?–540)
- Mar ben Huna, Dean (591/609–614/620)

== See also ==
- Religious leaders by year
- List of state leaders in the 6th century
- Lists of colonial governors by century
- State leaders by year
- International organization leaders by year
- Colonial governors by year
