= 536 =

Calendar year

536 in various calendars
- Gregorian calendar: 536; DXXXVI
- Ab urbe condita: 1289
- Assyrian calendar: 5286
- Balinese saka calendar: 457–458
- Bengali calendar: −58 – −57
- Berber calendar: 1486
- Buddhist calendar: 1080
- Burmese calendar: −102
- Byzantine calendar: 6044–6045
- Chinese calendar: 乙卯年 (Wood Rabbit); 3233 or 3026 — to — 丙辰年 (Fire Dragon); 3234 or 3027
- Coptic calendar: 252–253
- Discordian calendar: 1702
- Ethiopian calendar: 528–529
- Hebrew calendar: 4296–4297
- Hindu calendars
- Vikram Samvat: 592–593
- Shaka Samvat: 457–458
- Kali Yuga: 3636–3637
- Holocene calendar: 10536
- Iranian calendar: 86 BP – 85 BP
- Islamic calendar: 89 BH – 88 BH
- Javanese calendar: 423–424
- Julian calendar: 536; DXXXVI
- Korean calendar: 2869
- Minguo calendar: 1376 before ROC 民前1376年
- Nanakshahi calendar: −932
- Seleucid era: 847/848 AG
- Thai solar calendar: 1078–1079
- Tibetan calendar: ཤིང་མོ་ཡོས་ལོ་ (female Wood-Hare); 662 or 281 or −491 — to — མེ་ཕོ་འབྲུག་ལོ་ (male Fire-Dragon); 663 or 282 or −490

Year 536 (DXXXVI) was a leap year starting on Tuesday of the Julian calendar. At the time, it was known in the Roman Empire as the Year after the Consulship of Belisarius.

In 2018, medieval scholar Michael McCormick nominated this year as "the worst year to be alive" because of the volcanic winter of 536 caused by a volcanic eruption early in the year, causing average temperatures in Europe and China to decline and resulting in crop failures and famine for well over a year.

== Events ==
=== By place ===
==== Eastern Roman ("Byzantine") Empire ====
- Spring – Emperor Justinian I appoints his cousin Germanus as magister militum to deal with the crisis in Africa. He sends a mobile force of comitatenses (mostly cavalry) and an elite guard. Solomon, the previous magister militum, returns to Constantinople.
- Summer – Gothic War (535–554): Belisarius crosses the Strait of Messina and invades Italy. He conquers the city of Rhegium and advances to Naples.
- November – Siege of Naples: Belisarius captures Naples after a month's siege, by sending troops into the city through an abandoned Roman aqueduct.
- December 9 – Belisarius enters Rome through the Porta Asinaria, and the Gothic garrison of 4,000 men flees the city. He sends an urgent request for reinforcements to Justinian I, meanwhile preparing Rome for a siege, by bringing in great quantities of food and other supplies.
- Winter – Belisarius sets up his headquarters on the Pincian Hill, and repairs the neglected city walls of Rome. He stations a 5,000-man garrison, of whom half are his personal bodyguard (bucellarii). To hold parts of the city, he recruits 20,000 young Romans to man the walls.

==== Europe ====
- Early in 536 (possible) – Volcanic winter of 536: Famine is described in the Annals of Ulster.
- March – Ostrogothic King Theodahad cedes Provence and upper Alamannia to the Franks, gaining their support in the war. He sends a large Gothic army into Dalmatia. They defeat the Byzantines, Mundus is killed during the fighting at Salona, and the Byzantine army withdraws.
- Summer – Constantinianus, magister militum per Illyricum, retakes Dalmatia. The Goths abandon Salona and withdraw to the north. The Byzantines rebuild its walls and reclaim the province.
- December – Vitiges deposes his rival Theodahad at Ravenna, and marries Mataswintha (daughter of queen Amalasuintha). He becomes king of the Ostrogoths and assembles an army to fight against Belisarius.

==== Africa ====
- March – April – Belisarius sails to Carthage with 1,000 men, to suppress a mutiny against Solomon. Meanwhile, Carthage is besieged by 9,000 rebels, including many Vandals, under Stotzas.
- Battle of the River Bagradas: Belisarius defeats the mutineers, and hurries back to Sicily.

==== Asia ====
- January 26 – Senka succeeds his brother Ankan as the 28th emperor of Japan.
- August – Volcanic winter of 536: Snow falls in China, which causes the harvest to be delayed.

=== By topic ===
==== Religion ====
- Before March 13 – Anthimus I is deposed as patriarch of Constantinople in favour of Menas.
- April 22 – Pope Agapetus I dies in Constantinople, after a reign of just ten months. He is succeeded by Silverius as the 58th pope.
- May 2–June 4 – Council of Constantinople.
- September 19 – Council of Jerusalem.
- The Little Hagia Sophia in Constantinople (begun in 527) is completed as the Church of Saints Sergius and Bacchus.

==== Climate ====
- The volcanic winter of 536, thought to have been caused by an extensive veil of dust in the atmosphere, began in the Northern Hemisphere. It continued until the following year, causing unseasonal weather and crop failure worldwide.

== Births ==
- unknown date – Li Ezi, Chinese empress dowager of Northern Zhou (d. 588)
- probable
  - Evagrius Scholasticus, Syrian church historian (or 537) (d. 594)
  - Venantius Fortunatus, Merovingian bishop and poet (d. c. 600/609)

== Deaths ==
- January 25 – Ankan, emperor of Japan (b. c. 466)
- April 22 – Pope Agapetus I
- December – Theodahad, king of the Ostrogoths (assassinated) (b. c. 480)
- unknown date – Mundus, Gepid Byzantine general (killed in action)
