= Council of Jerusalem (536) =

Synod in 536

The Council of Jerusalem of 536 was a meeting of Chalcedonian representatives of the church of the Three Palestines (Prima, Secunda, Tertia) to condemn certain persons accused of the Monophysite heresy. It was convoked at the initiative the Roman emperor Justinian I following the forced resignation of the Patriarch Anthimus I of Constantinople in February or March, an event in which Pope Agapetus I had played the main role.

Following the Council of Constantinople in May–June 536, Patriarch Menas of Constantinople wrote to Patriarch Peter of Jerusalem urging him to hold a council of the Three Palestines to condemn the same heretics as had Constantinople: Anthimus, Severus of Antioch, Zaʿūra the Stylite and Peter of Apamea. The emperor also sent a letter. These letters were delivered by the monks of the Judaean Desert who had traveled to Constantinople to take part in the council there. Since Jerusalem had only been raised to a patriarchate by the Council of Chalcedon in 451, the authority of the bishop of the city over the church in the Three Palestines was not accepted by anti-Chalcedonians.

The council met on 19 September 536 in Jerusalem (formally Aelia Capitolina). It conducted its business in Greek. Its acts are preserved in the collection known as the Collectio Sabbaitica. The verdicts of the Council of Constantinople were read into the record and the assembled clergy at Jerusalem discussed all four condemned clerics. Their own verdict, however, only explicitly condemned Anthimus. It was subscribed by 47 bishops, which was almost every bishop in the Three Palestines. There is no logical sequence to the subscriptions and they were all made in Greek.

== List of signatory bishoprics ==
The list of 47 bishops appears to be nearly complete for the Three Palestines. Among the known sees of ancient Palestine, only the bishoprics of Diospolis, Maiuma of Ascalon, Maiuma of Gaza and Zoara were probably in existence in 536 and are unrepresented in the subscriptions.

1. Aelia (Jerusalem)
2. Caesarea
3. Scythopolis
4. Tiberias
5. Sariphaia
6. Gabae
7. Raphia
8. Joppe
9. Augustopolis
10. Abila
11. Azotus
12. Sozousa
13. Arda, possibly Orda in Gerar
14. Eleutheropolis
15. Jericho
16. Areopolis
17. Diara, probably Dora
18. Charachmouba
19. the city of the Menutai, that is, Menois
20. Pella
21. Bitulion
22. Iotabe
23. Elousa
24. Gaza
25. Petra
26. Nicopolis
27. Gadara
28. Helenopolis
29. Diocaesarea
30. the city of the Bakanoi, probably Bacatha
31. Ascalon
32. Phaino
33. Arindela
34. Sycomazon
35. Neapolis
36. Parembolai
37. the city of the Libisioi, possibly Livias
38. Maximianopolis
39. Sebaste
40. Jamnia
41. Exalos
42. Gazara
43. Aila
44. Hippos
45. Capitolias
46. Amathous
47. Anthedon

== Bibliography ==
- Menze, Volker L. (2008). Justinian and the Making of the Syrian Orthodox Church. Oxford University Press.
- Millar, Fergus (2008). "Rome, Constantinople and the Near Eastern Church under Justinian: Two Synods of CE 536". The Journal of Roman Studies. 98: 62–82. doi:10.3815/007543508786239102.
- Millar, Fergus (2009). "Linguistic Co-existence in Constantinople: Greek and Latin (and Syriac) in the Acts of the Synod of 536 CE". The Journal of Roman Studies. 99: 92–103. doi:10.3815/007543509789745287.
