= Zoora =

Saint Zoora
- Church: Syriac Orthodox Church

Personal details
- Born: 6th century Amida, modern-day Diyarbakır
- Denomination: non-Chalcedonian Christianity

Sainthood
- Feast day: 8 October
- Venerated in: Oriental Orthodox Church

Zoora (Syriac: ܙܥܘܪܐ, Zʿura; (Note: Other romanizations include Zaʿūra and Zʿōrā.) Greek Ζωόρας, Zooras), also called Z'ura the Stylite, was a Syrian (Note: He is called suryāyā by the Chalcedonians in John of Ephesus' account, a term which probably referred to "a religiou identity, meaning Syrian Orthodox".) monk and stylite in the Eastern Roman Empire in the 530s. He was a prominent Miaphysite theologian and a close associate of Severus of Antioch, and is highly venerated within the Syriac Orthodox Church tradition.

== Life ==
The life of Z'ura is mainly known through a hagiography written by his contemporary, John of Ephesus, who likely encountered him in Constantinople around 536. The first part of it is missing. Z'ura hailed from the region around Amida. He received his spiritual training under a certain Habib. Sometime before the Hunnic invasion of 515, during the reign of Anastasius I, he ascended a pillar. He was reportedly short in stature, and John of Ephesus humorously notes the linguistic coincidence that his name means "small" in Syriac.

Z'ura remained a stylite until at least the end of Justin I's reign in 527, though he was compelled to descend by the Chalcedonians. He travelled to Constantinople early in the reign of Justin's successor, Justinian I, (Note: He "had been some time in the royal city" by 536 and had been greeted on his arrival by Justinian, but John's account of his life makes no mention of the Constantinopolitan earthquake of November 533.) with an entourage of ten disciples. By this time he was renowned locally, and when he arrived in Constantinople, he had a stormy interview with Justinian, during which he cursed the emperor for persecuting the faithful (i.e., the Miaphysites) and the emperor reminded him that he had proclaimed the death penalty for all who cursed the Council of Chalcedon, to which he paid little attention to. Despite having limited formal education, Z'ura's spiritual authority and parrhesia (forthrightness) derived from his strict ascetic practices, and his theological rivals initially regarded his rhetorical skills with apprehension

Justinian's wife, Empress Theodora, who was a Miaphysite and close friend of Severus of Antioch, intervened to protect Z'ura. When Justinian suffered from swelling, she had the monk pray for him, which reportedly healed him. She established him in the posh district of Sykai, where he officiated at baptisms and celebrated the Miaphysite liturgy, otherwise illegal in the empire. For this reason he was identified as a priest at the council of 536. He also reportedly set up 100 tables a day to feed the poor, which contributed immensely to his popularity. He even baptised many children of the Imperial Guards.

John of Ephesus claimed that the fame of Z'ura drew Pope Agapetus I to Constantinople in 536. Whatever the case, the pope consented to the deposition of Anthimus I, Miaphysite patriarch of Constantinople, and consecrated a new patriarch, Mennas, after confirming Justinian's declaration of faith. According to John, the pope's sudden death on April 22 was a result of a curse placed on him by Z'ura. Mennas called a council to meet in August and on August 13, in response to the council's concerns, Justinian banned Z'ura and other Miaphysites from Constantinople. The monk did not immediately leave, but he eventually moved to Dercus in Thrace.

At Dercus, Z'ura was joined by the deposed Patriarch Theodosius of Alexandria in 537. Empress Theodora soon had both of them moved into the Palace of Hormisdas. The date of his death is unknown.

== Veneration ==
Many miracles were attributed to Z'ura after his death. In the Syriac Orthodox Church, he is regarded as a saint. His feast may be celebrated on 16 March, 11 May, 1 October or 8 October. In the 7th century, there was a church at Amida dedicated to Z'ura. There were also many monasteries dedicated to him as far away as Palestine, which Justinian ordered closed after the council of 536.

== Bibliography ==
- Debié, Muriel (2009). "Syriac Historiography and Identity Formation". Church History and Religious Culture. 89 (1): 93–114.
- Dell'Osso, C. (2014). "Zoora, monk". In Angelo Di Berardino (ed.). Encyclopedia of Ancient Christianity. Vol. 3. IVP Academic. p. 968.
- Fiey, Jean Maurice (1975). Les Stylites syriens. Éditions de la Custodie de T.S.
- Fiey, Jean Maurice (2004). Saints Syriaques. Darwin Press.
- Harrak, Amir, ed. (1999). The Chronicle of Zuqnīn, Parts III and IV: A.D. 488–775. Pontifical Institute of Mediaeval Studies.
- Harvey, Susan Ashbrook (1990). Asceticism and Society in Crisis: John of Ephesus and the Lives of the Eastern Saints. University of California Press.
- Menze, Volker L. (2008). Justinian and the Making of the Syrian Orthodox Church. Oxford University Press.
- Potter, David (2015). Theodora: Actress, Empress, Saint. Oxford University Press.
