= Domnicus =

Flavius Domnicus (Greek: Δόμνικος) was a Byzantine military officer and patrikios, active in the reign of Emperor Justinian I (r. 527–565). He should not be confused with his contemporary Domnicus, Praetorian prefect of Illyricum (term 535–540).

== Biography ==
Domnicus is first mentioned in 536. He was a member of the Byzantine Senate. Procopius records that Domnicus was sent to the Praetorian prefecture of Africa, alongside Germanus and Symmachus. The three were tasked with facing the military rebellion of Stotzas. Domnicus took over command of the infantry forces of the area, succeeding the deceased John of Epidamnus. He served in command of the infantry at the Battle of Scalae Veteres (537). The battle was a victory for Germanus and his forces. Germanus, Domnicus, and Symmachus were recalled to Constantinople in 539.

Documents of 540 have Domnicus listing his own titles: comes domesticorum, former consul (honorary consul), and patrician. During his service in Africa, Domnicus likely held the rank of magister militum. He obviously no longer held any military tile in 540. That year, Emperor Justinian I assigned Domnicus and Maximinus as his new envoys to the court of Vitiges (reigned 536–540) in Ravenna. Domnicus also delivered a letter of Emperor Justinian to Pope Vigilius (term 537–555). He returned to Constantinople, transporting letters from Vigilius to Emperor Justinian and Patriarch Menas of Constantinople. The letters addressed matters of faith. Domnicus added his own signature to them "by way of approval".

The letters of Vigilius have survived. They support the decisions of a council of Constantinople in 536. Said decisions confirmed adherence to the rules of the Council of Chalcedon (451) and opposition to Monophysitism. Domnicus's approval of their content indicates that the patrikios was an adherent of Chalcedonian Christianity. There is no further mention of him.

== Sources ==
- Bury, John Bagnell (1958) [1923]. History of the Later Roman Empire: From the Death of Theodosius I to the Death of Justinian, Volume 2. Mineola, New York: Dover Publications. OCLC 41478187.
- Martindale, John R., ed. (1992). The Prosopography of the Later Roman Empire: Volume III, AD 527–641. Cambridge: Cambridge University Press. ISBN 0-521-20160-8.
