= Three-Chapter Controversy =

Phase in the Chalcedonian controversy

The Three-Chapter Controversy, a phase in the Chalcedonian controversy, was an attempt to reconcile the non-Chalcedonians of Syria and Egypt with Chalcedonian Christianity, following the failure of the Henotikon. The Three Chapters (τρία κεφάλαια, tría kephálaia) that Emperor Justinian I anathematized were:

1. The person and writings of Theodore of Mopsuestia
2. Certain writings of Theodoret of Cyrus
3. The letter of Ibas of Edessa to Maris

== Background ==
At a very early stage of the controversy the incriminated writings themselves came to be spoken of as the Three Chapters. In consequence those who refused to anathematize these writings were said to defend the Three Chapters, and accused of professing Nestorianism; and, conversely, those who did anathematize them, were said to condemn the Three Chapters as heretical.

At the end of 543 or the beginning of 544 the Emperor Justinian I issued an edict in which the three chapters were anathematized, in hope of encouraging the Oriental Orthodox to accept the decisions of the Council of Chalcedon and the Tome of Pope Leo I, thus bringing religious harmony to the Byzantine Empire. However, Evagrius tells us that Theodorus Ascidas, the leader of the Origenists, had raised the question of the Three Chapters to divert Justinian from a persecution of his party. Liberatus adds that Theodorus Ascidas wished to take revenge on the memory of Theodore of Mopsuestia, who had written much against Origen. In his letter to Vigilius, Domitian, Bishop of Ancyra, reports the same story of intrigue.

Although Catholic canonists admit that theological errors, and in the case of Theodore very serious ones, can be found in the writings, the mistakes of Theodoret and Ibas were chiefly but not wholly due to a misunderstanding of the language of Cyril of Alexandria. However these errors do not make the decision of condemnation easy, for there were no good precedents for dealing harshly with the memory of men who had died in peace with the Church. Facundus, Bishop of Hermiane, pointed out in his Defensio trium capitulorum that Saint Cyprian had erred about the rebaptism of heretics, yet no one would dream of anathematizing him. The condemnation of the "Three Chapters" was demanded primarily to appease opponents of the Council of Chalcedon. Both Ibas and Theodoret had been deprived of their bishoprics by condemned heretics, and both were restored by the Council of Chalcedon upon anathematizing Nestorius.

== The subscription ==
The leading Eastern bishops were coerced, after a short resistance, into subscribing. Mennas, Patriarch of Constantinople, first protested that to sign was to condemn the Council of Chalcedon, and then yielded, as he told Stephen, the Roman apocrisiarius at Constantinople, that his subscription should be returned to him if the Pope disapproved of it. Stephen and Dacius, Bishop of Milan, who was then at Constantinople, broke off communion with him. Patriarch Zoilus of Alexandria, Patriarch Ephraim of Antioch, and Patriarch Peter of Jerusalem all yielded after a brief resistance. Other bishops who subscribed were rewarded, while those who refused were deposed or had to "conceal themselves".

While the resistance of the Greek-speaking bishops collapsed, those from the Latin-speaking world, such as Dacius of Milan and Facundus, who were then at Constantinople, stood firm. Their general attitude is represented in two letters still extant. The first is from an African bishop named Pontianus, in which he entreats the emperor to withdraw the Three Chapters edict on the ground that their condemnation struck at the Council of Chalcedon. The other is from the Carthaginian deacon Ferrandus; his opinion as a most learned canonist was asked by the Roman deacons Pelagius (afterwards pope, at this time a strong defender of the Three Chapters) and Anatolius. He fastened on the epistle of Ibas: if this was received at Chalcedon, to anathematize it now was to condemn the council. An even stronger use of the benevolence of the council towards this epistle was made by Facundus at one of the conferences held by Pope Vigilius before he issued his Iudicatum. He wished it to protect the memory of Theodore of Mopsuestia because Ibas had spoken of him in terms of commendation (Cont. Moc.). When Vigilius arrived at Constantinople in January 547, Italy, Africa, Sardinia, Sicily, and the parts of Illyricum and Greece through which he journeyed were fiercely against the condemnation of the Three Chapters.

The matter was further complicated by the fact that the Latin-speaking bishops, Vigilius among them, were for the most part ignorant of Greek and therefore unable to judge the incriminated writings for themselves. Pelagius II in his third epistle to Elias, probably drawn up by the future Gregory I, ascribes all the trouble to this ignorance. This handicap should be remembered in judging the conduct of Vigilius. He came to Constantinople very resolute in his opinions, and his first step was to excommunicate Mennas, who removed Vigilius from the diptychs in turn. But he must have felt the ground was being cut from under his feet when he was supplied with translations of some of the most questionable passages from the writings of Theodore. In 548 he issued his Iudicatum in which the Three Chapters were condemned, then temporarily withdrew it when the storm it raised showed how ill-prepared the Latins were for it. He and Justinian agreed to convening a general council, in which Vigilius pledged himself to bring about the condemnation of the Three Chapters, but the emperor broke his pledge by issuing another edict condemning the Chapters. Vigilius had twice to take sanctuary, first in the Basilica of St. Peter, and then in the Church of St. Euphemia at Chalcedon, from which he issued an Encyclical letter describing the treatment he had received. An agreement was patched up and Vigilius agreed to a general council but soon withdrew his assent. Nevertheless, the council was held, and after refusing to accept the Constitutum of Vigilius, it then condemned the Three Chapters. Finally Vigilius succumbed, subscribed to the council, and was set free. But he died before reaching Italy, leaving his successor Pelagius the task of dealing with the schisms in the West.

== The schism in the West ==
The bishops of Aquileia, Milan, and of the Istrian peninsula all refused to condemn the Three Chapters, arguing that to do so would be to betray Chalcedon. They in turn were anathematized by the Council. Meanwhile, since these bishops and most of their suffragans were soon to become subjects of the Lombards in 568, they would be beyond the reach of the coercion of the Byzantine Exarch at Ravenna, and able to continue their dissent.

However, the bishop of Milan renewed communion with Rome after the death of bishop Fronto around 581. As he had fled from the Lombards to refuge at Genoa, his successor, Laurence, was dependent upon the Byzantines for support. He subscribed to the condemnation.

In 568, the schismatic bishop of Aquileia had fled eight miles south to Byzantine controlled Grado. The Byzantines allowed these freedom and archbishop Elias, already called patriarch by his suffragans, built a cathedral under the patronage of St. Euphemia as an unabashed statement of his adherence to the schism since it was the church of St. Euphemia in which the sessions of the Council of Chalcedon were approved. Gregory the Great's attempts at conciliation near the end of his pontificate, and especially through the Lombard queen, Theodelinda, began to have some effect. Thus, in 606, Elias's successor Severus died and there were many clerics favorable to reconciliation. The Byzantines encouraged these to elect Candidianus who once elected promptly restored communion. However, certain stalwart clerics were unhappy and having fled to mainland Aquileia under Lombard protection elected a John as a rival bishop who maintained the schism. Thus, the schism deepened now along political Lombard-Roman lines. Columbanus was involved in the first attempt to resolve this division through mediation in 613. The bishop of "old" Aquileia formally ended the schism at the Synod of Aquileia in 698, only after the Lombards embraced Orthodoxy in the 7th century. The division of the Patriarchate of Aquileia contributed to the evolution of the Patriarch of Grado into the present Patriarch of Venice.

The churches of the Visigothic Kingdom of Spain (Reccared having converted a short time prior) never accepted the council; when news of the later Third Council of Constantinople was communicated to them by Rome it was received as the fifth ecumenical council, not the sixth. Isidore of Seville, in his Chronicle and De Viris Illustribus, judged Justinian a tyrant and persecutor of the orthodox and an admirer of heresy, contrasting him with Facundus of Hermiane and Victor of Tunnuna, who was considered a martyr.

== Its effect in the East ==
For all of Justinian's intents, this edict was of negligible effect in the East. In the decades following Justinian's death, the local Christians were more concerned for their safety in the wars first against a resurgent Persia, then next against the Arabs, who came to permanently control the territories beyond the Taurus Mountains in the 630s. The Christians in those regions either adhered to the edicts proclaimed in Constantinople and Rome, or with determination held to their own Non-Chalcedonian beliefs.

== Bibliography ==
=== Primary sources ===
- The Acts of the Council of Constantinople of 553 with related texts on the Three Chapters Controversy. Translated Texts for Historians. Vol. 51. Translated by Richard Price. Liverpool University Press. 2009a. ISBN 978-1-84631-178-9.
- The Acts of the Council of Constantinople of 553 with related texts on the Three Chapters Controversy. Translated Texts for Historians. Vol. 51. Translated by Richard Price. Liverpool University Press. 2009b. ISBN 978-1-84631-178-9.
- On the Person of Christ: The Christology of Emperor Justinian. Translated by K. P. Wesche. New York: St Vladimir's Seminary Press. 1991. ISBN 0-88141-089-6.

=== Secondary sources ===
In English

- Amory, Patrick (1997). People and Identity in Ostrogotic Italy, 489-554. Cambridge Studies in Medieval Life and Thought. Cambridge University Press. ISBN 0-521-57151-0.
- Anastos, Milton V. (1951). "The Immutability of Christ and Justinian's Condemnation of Theodore of Mopsuestia". Dumbarton Oaks Papers. 6: 123–160. doi:10.2307/1291085. JSTOR 1291085.
- Herrin, Judith (1989). The Formation of Christendom, revised, illustrated paperback edition. London: Princeton University Press and Fontana.
- Grillmeier, Aloys (1987). Christ in Christian Tradition: Reception and Contradiction: The Development of the Discussion about Chalcedon from 451 to the Beginning of the reign of Justinian. Vol. 2/1. Atlanta: John Knox Press. ISBN 9780664221607.
- Grillmeier, Aloys; Hainthaler, Theresia (1995). Christ in Christian Tradition: The Church of Constantinople in the Sixth Century. Vol. 2/2. Louisville: Westminster John Knox Press. ISBN 9780664219970.
- Grillmeier, Aloys; Hainthaler, Theresia (2013). Christ in Christian Tradition: The Churches of Jerusalem and Antioch from 451 to 600. Vol. 2/3. Oxford: Oxford University Press. ISBN 978-0-19-921288-0.
- Gray, Patrick T. R.; Herren, Michael W. (1994). "Columbanus and the three chapters controversy — a new approach". The Journal of Theological Studies. 45 (1) (Journal of Theological Studies ed.): 160–170. doi:10.1093/jts/45.1.160. JSTOR 23966897.
- Harnack, Adolf von (1898). History of Dogma. Vol. IV. Boston.
- McGuckin, John Anthony (2004). The Westminster Handbook to Origen. Westminster John Knox Press. ISBN 0-664-22472-5.
- McLeod, Frederick (2009). Theodore of Mopsuestia. London: Routledge. ISBN 9781134079285.
- Menze, V.-L. (2008). Justinian and the making of the Syrian Orthodox Church. Oxford University Press. ISBN 978-0-19-953487-6.
- Meyendorff, John (1989). Imperial Unity and Christian Divisions: The Church 450–680 A.D. Crestwood, NY: St. Vladimir's Seminary Press. ISBN 9780881410563.
- Pavouris, Raphael (2001). The condemnation of the Christology of the three chapters in its historical and doctrinal context: the assessment and judgement of Emperor Justinian and the Fifth Ecumenical Council (553) (PhD) (PhD thesis ed.). University of Glasgow.
- Price, Richard M. (2007). "The Three Chapters Controversy and the Council of Chalcedon". The Crisis of the Oikoumene: The Three Chapters and the Failed Quest for Unity in the Sixth-century Mediterranean. Turnhout: Brepols. pp. 17–37. ISBN 9782503515205.
- Sotinel, Claire (2007). "The Three Chapters and the Transformations of Italy". The Crisis of the Oikoumene: The Three Chapters and the Failed Quest for Unity in the Sixth-century Mediterranean. Turnhout: Brepols. pp. 85–120. ISBN 9782503515205.
- Quasten, J. (1986). Patrology. Vol. III. Westminster, Maryland: Christian classics, Inc. ISBN 0-87061-086-4.

In German

- Diekamp, Franz (1899). Die Origenistischen streitigkeiten im sechsten Jahrhundert und das fünfte allegemeine Concil. Münster.
- Rammelt, C. (2008). Ibas von Edessa. Arbeiten zur Kirchengeschichte. Vol. 106. Walter de Gruyter. ISBN 978-3-11-020218-2.

In French

- Amann, É. (1946). "Trois Chaitres". XV (II) (Dictionnaire de théologie catholique ed.). Paris: 1868–1924.
- Duchesne, L. (1884). Vigile et Pélage; étude sur l'histoire de l'église romaine au milieu du VIe siècle. Paris.
- Hefele, Karl Josef von; Leclerq, H. (1908). Histoire des conciles. Vol. 2. Paris.
- Hefele C. J., Leclerq H. (1909). Histoire des conciles. Vol. 3. Paris.
- Labourt J. (1904). Le christianisme dans l'empire Perse. Paris.
- Sotinel C. (1992). "Autorité pontificale et pouvoir impérial sous le règne de Justinien : le pape Vigile". Mélanges de l'École française de Rome: Antiquité. 104 (1) (Mélanges de l'Ecole française de Rome. Antiquité ed.): 439–463. doi:10.3406/mefr.1992.1762.
