= Germanus of Capua =

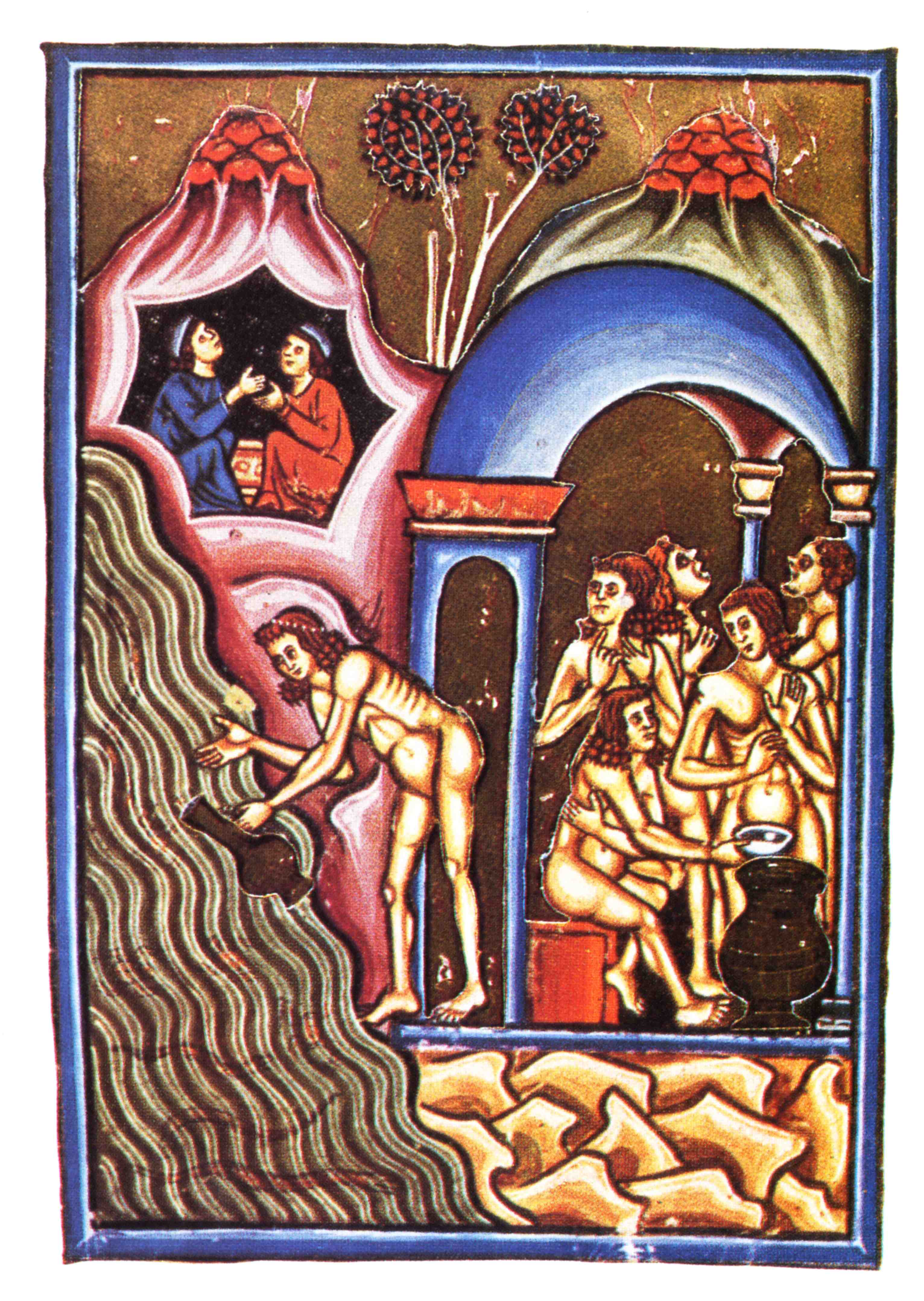
Germanus and Paschasius meet in the afterlife (upper left), from De balneis Puteolanis by Peter of Eboli (twelfth century)

Germanus (died 541) was the bishop of Capua from 519 or shortly before until his death. He played a major role in bringing to an end the Acacian schism, the first major schism that divided the Christian church between east and west.

After his death, he was venerated as a saint. His feast day is October 30 in the Roman Martyrology.

== Life ==
=== Early life and election as bishop ===
Nothing is known with certainty of Germanus's life before he was bishop. The only source to provide information about this period is a hagiography penned in the ninth century. It records his father's name as Amantius and his mother's as Juliana. He was born in Capua in the 470s. After his father's death, he sold his inheritance with his mother's blessing in order to devote himself to the ascetic life. When on the death of Bishop Alexander the Capuans elected him their bishop, Germanus at first refused the honour before being persuaded to accept. This account of his early life cannot be substantiated in other sources.

=== Mission to the East in 519–520 ===
At the time of his election, Capua lay within the Ostrogothic Kingdom. Shortly after his election, he was made a member of the legation sent by Pope Hormisdas to the court of the Emperor Justin I in Constantinople, the purpose of which was to negotiate an end to the Acacian schism between the western and eastern churches. The contemporary Liber pontificalis refers to him as "Capuan bishop" (Capuanus episcopus) in connection with this legation and provides a terminus ante quem for his assumption of episcopal office. The legation consisted of Germanus, the Alexandrian deacon Dioscorus, a bishop named John, a Roman deacon named Felix, a Roman priest named Blandus and a notary named Peter. They gathered in Rome between January and March 519. In both the Liber pontificalis and the letters of Pope Hormisdas, Germanus is always named first, indicating that he was the leader of the group.

The mission of 519 was the third such papal initiative since the schism began in 482. That of 496–497 also involved a bishop named Germanus, who in early scholarship was often identified with the Germanus of 519. It has been shown, however, that these were different people. The legate of 496 was Germanus of Pesaro. Although the two previous missions had yielded no results, that of 519 took place in propitious circumstances. It had the support of the Ostrogothic king Theoderic and of the new emperor and patriarch in Constantinople, Justin I and John of Cappadocia. In a letter to Justin's nephew, Count Justinian, Pope Hormisdas specifies that the members of his legation were selected for their "quality".

Germanus's itinerary on his legation is known primarily from various letters. They crossed the Adriatic to Aulon, then passed through Lychnidus on their way to Thessalonica, where Germanus celebrated mass. They were met by Justinian ten miles outside of Constantinople. According to a letter from Germanus to Hormisdas dated 22 April 519, the population of the city received them with cheering. They met the emperor and separately the Senate on the Monday of Holy Week (24–31 March). On Thursday, they met with the emperor, Senate and patriarch all at once in the Palace to present the libellus Hormisdae, the document entrusted to them by the pope outlining his conditions for the healing of the schism. The conditions were accepted. Germanus and his colleagues remained in the east for another year securing the acceptance of the libellus outside of Constantinople. On 9 July 520, the emperor wrote to Pope Hormisdas to commend his legates. The Liber pontificalis credits Germanus with deftly handling the Theopaschite controversy, the calculation of the date of Easter and the reintegration of bishops deposed by the Emperor Anastasius I.

=== Later career, death and veneration ===
Little is known of Germanus's pontificate after the end of his successful mission to the east. According to the tenth-century Chronicon Salernitanum, Germanus changed the dedication of the Constantinian basilica of Capua from the Apostles to Saints Stephen and Agatha after depositing there some of their relics that he had obtained as a reward from the emperor himself. According to his eighth- or ninth-century biography, Bishop Sabinus of Canosa was an acquaintance of Germanus. Both went on papal missions to fight monophysitism in the eastern churches, Sabinus in 536. Sabinus was also close to Benedict of Nursia. Pope Gregory the Great in his Dialogues mentions how Benedict, praying atop Monte Cassino, had a vision of the soul of Germanus in the form of a ball of fire being carried to heaven by angels. He later learned that this vision coincided with Germanus's death.

The death of Germanus can be placed in early 541 because of an inscription which gives the start of his successor Victor's pontificate in that year. After his death, Germanus was venerated as a saint in southern Italy throughout the early Middle Ages. In his Dialogues, Gregory the Great prays to Germanus to intercede on behalf of the soul of a deacon named Paschasius in Purgatory. When Count Lando I of Capua relocated the city of Capua in 849, Germanus's body was moved with it. In late 873, following a campaign against the Arabs harassing Capua, the Emperor Louis II of Italy took some of Germanus's relics to Monte Cassino, according to the Chronica monasterii Casinensis. The village at the foot of the hill, ancient Casinum, became known as San Germano. The Empress Engelberga took another part of his relics to endow the monastery of San Sisto that she founded in Piacenza in 874. Since the Vita sancti Germani episcopi Capuani (Life of Saint Germanus) mentions neither of these transfers, it was probably finished before 873.

== Bibliography ==
- Blaudeau, Philippe (2004). "A Stereotype of the Roman History of Monophysism? About the Violent Episode of Thessalonica (September 519)". Hortus Artium Medievalium. 10: 205–210. doi:10.1484/j.ham.2.305308.
- Johnson, Mark J. (2009). "The Constantinian Churches of Campania: Texts and Contexts". In Girolamo F. De Simone; Roger T. Macfarlane (eds.). Apolline Project Vol. 1: Studies on Vesuvius' North Slope and the Bay of Naples (PDF). Università degli Studi Suor Orsola Benincasa and Brigham Young University. pp. 247–262.
- Marazzi, Federico (2000). "Germano, santo". Dizionario Biografico degli Italiani (in Italian). Vol. 53: Gelati–Ghisalberti. Rome: Istituto dell'Enciclopedia Italiana. ISBN 978-88-12-00032-6.
- Marone, Paola (2014). "Germanus of Capua". In Angelo Di Berardino (ed.). Encyclopedia of Ancient Christianity. Vol. 2. IVP Academic. pp. 124–125.
- Watkins, Basil (2016). The Book of Saints: A Comprehensive Biographical Dictionary (8th rev. ed.). Bloomsbury.
