= Abila (Decapolis) =

Ancient city in the Levant

Abila in the Decapolis
- Abila Dekapoleos
- Seleukeia (Greek), Seleucia (Latin), Raphana (Latin), Quwaylibah (Arabic)
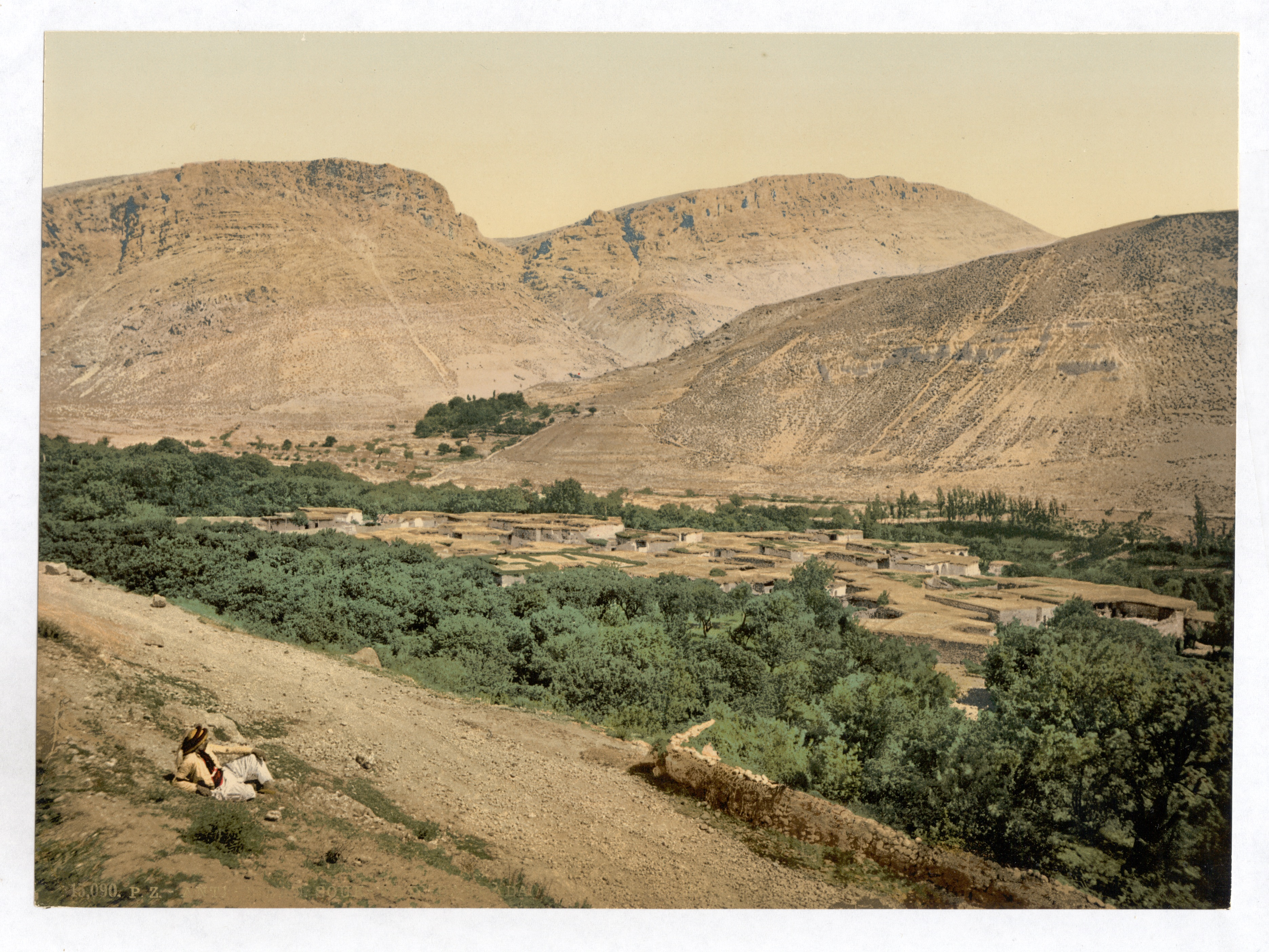
- A view into Wadi Qweilibeh from the flank of Tell Umm al-Amad. The forested strip in the foreground is the course of a stream The structures beyond the stream are a cemetery, with rock-cut tombs up on the far slope.

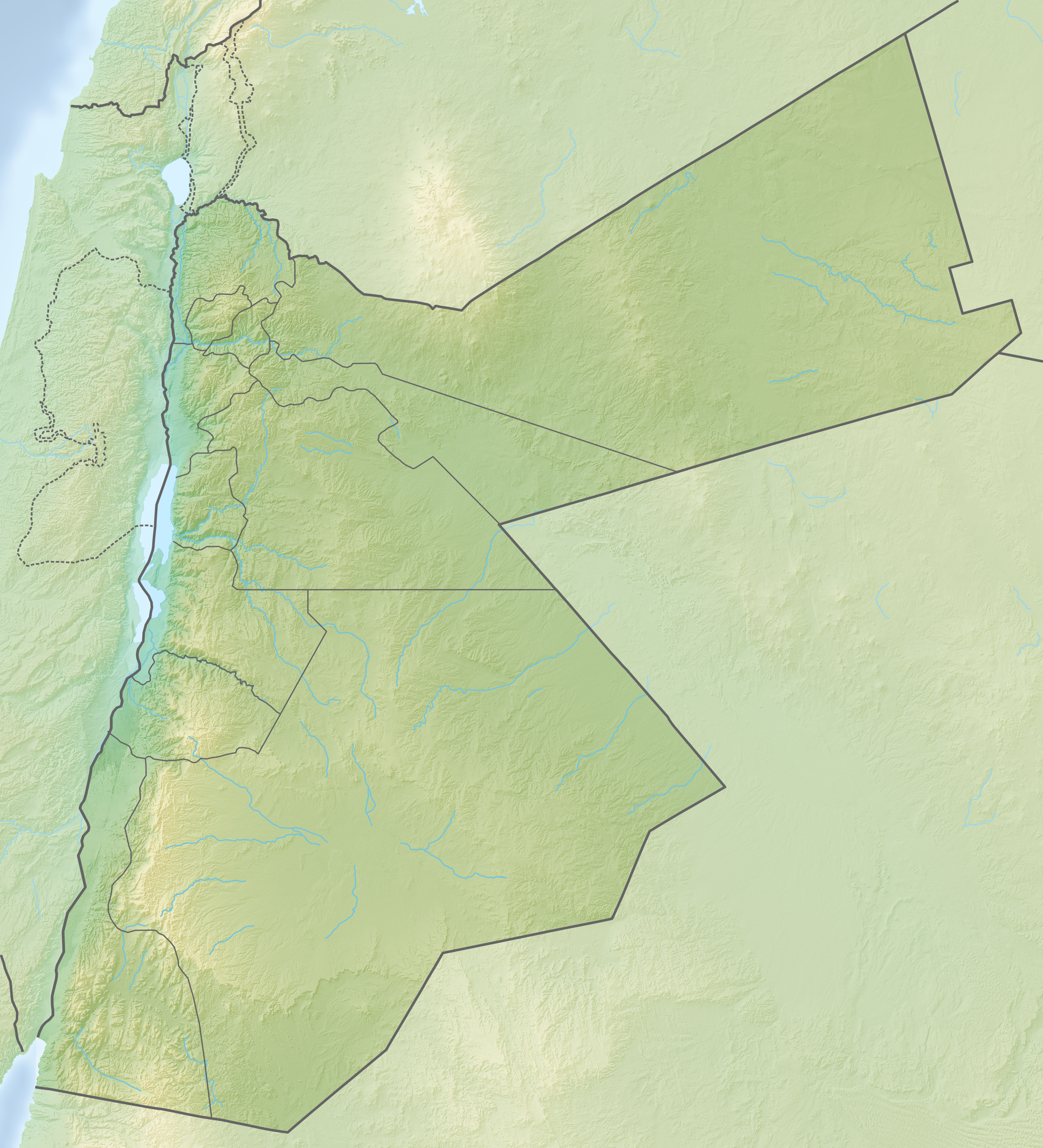
- Jordan
- 32°40′52″N 35°52′11″E
- Type: Settlement
- Location: Irbid Governorate, Jordan
- Region: Northern Region (geographic only)
- Part of: Dekapolis

History
- Built: 1950 BC, start of Middle Bronze Age

Site notes
- Material: Mainly limestone blocks quarried locally
- Elevation: 440 m (1,440 ft)
- Length: 1,500 m (0.93 mi)
- Width: 600 m (0.37 mi)

Abila, distinguished as Abila in the Decapolis (Ancient Greek: Ἄβιλα Δεκαπόλεως, Abila Dekapoleos), and also known for a time as Seleucia (Ancient Greek: Σελεύκεια, Seleúkeia), and Abila Viniferos ( by Eusebios, by Hieronymus Abela Vini fertilis), was a city in the Decapolis; the site, now referred to as Qweilbeh (Arabic: قويلبة; also Quwaylibah, Qualibah), occupies two tells, Tell al-Abila and Khirbet Tell Umm al-Amad.

The site was submitted to the list of tentative World Heritage sites under criteria I, III and IV on June 18, 2001, by the Ministry of Tourism and Antiquities of Jordan.

== Etymology ==
The name "Abila" is derived from the Semitic word Abel (in Hebrew, "meadow" and in Arabic, "green growth"). The largest site is located amidst verdant agricultural fields near the modern Ain Quweilbeh spring. Roman temples, Byzantine churches and early mosques lie amidst olive groves and wheat fields.

The name of the south hill, Umm al-Amad, means "Mother of the Columns", where large columns can be found.

== Geology ==
The natural stone of the Transjordan region is beds of limestone and chalky limestone laid down in marine deposits in the Eocene and raised above sea level as the Belqa Group in the middle Eocene. Their relatively soft stone is extensively transected by eroded wadis and is covered by meters of erosional soil termed terra rossa The Abila site is covered by approximately a meter of another, closely related soil, Rendzina. Both soils are fertile, contributing to the agriculture and arboriculture of the area.

== Topography and spatial evolution ==
Tell Umm al-Amad is also termed Khirbet Umm al-Amad, where khirbet is "ruined settlement." As the wadi is aligned north-south at that location, Tell Umm al-Amad is dubbed "the south tell." The unit of north and south tells create a defensible elevation similar to an acropolis surrounded on three sides by wadis. Tell in Arabic means only "hill", and the archaeological connotation of "hill of accumulated debris" in this case does not apply, as the city was built over two natural hills on the left bank of Wadi ("valley") Qweilibeh.. Its area is delineated by hills and escarpments.

The presence of a city wall first constructed in the Iron Age and enhanced under the Macedonians and Romans defined the defensible part of the settlement. In shape the walled city at its peak was an elongated rectangle beginning on the stream-facing slope of Tell Abila and slanting across the depression between the two hills to end at the summit of the south hill.

The archaeology bears out that the settlement on the north hill was the original Abila. Most of the city was in the saddle-shaped surface between the two hills. The slopes were overcome by terracing the saddle.

However defensible, a city on a hill could not exist without native water and food supplies.

== History and archaeology ==
The site was in use from the Neolithic period until the Abbasid/Fatimid and Ayyubid/Mamluk periods, though its use in these later periods was limited. The excavations have shown habitation at Abila from c. 4000 BCE to 1500 CE, and have yielded numerous artifacts, and unearthed remains of city walls, a temple, a large theatre, a nymphaeum, and a sixth-century church.

The first known European to visit the site was Ulrich Jasper Seetzen in 1806. G. Schumacher has given a protracted description of the site, in his work Abilah of the Decapolis, published by the Palestine Exploration Fund. The ruins have been described in published literature as early as 1889 by Guy Le Strange. The site has been extensively excavated since 1980. While several of its ancient structures have been excavated including aqueducts, tombs, gates and public buildings, much of it remains unexcavated, yet visible at the surface.

=== Bronze Age ===
Abila possibly appears in one of the 14th century BC Amarna letters as Ia-bi-li-ma.

=== Iron Age ===
The first city wall was built during the Iron Age.

=== Hellenistic period ===
Polybius and Josephus mention the capture of the Ptolemaic city by the Seleucid king Antiochus III in 218 BCE.

Hasmonean king Alexander Jannaeus (r. 103-76 BCE) conquered Abila during his expansion wars.

Among the remains from the Hellenistic period are coins from Tyre.

=== Roman period ===
Abila was taken by Roman general Pompey in 63 BCE and granted independence. In the ensuing Roman and Byzantine periods, Abila reached a position of regional importance. Abila was part of the Hellenistic city league known as the Decapolis, as proven by an inscription from the time of Emperor Hadrian (r. 117–138), in spite of it missing from the list given by Pliny.

Excavations at the site have revealed a thriving local economy during the Roman period. Archaeological finds include large‑scale glass production (lamps, bowls, bottles, goblets, and slag), pottery kilns with thousands of sherds, and wine and olive oil presses cut into bedrock. Excavations also unveiled coins of Nabataean king Aretas IV and queen Shaqillah, as well as a coin of Archelaus, ethnarch of Judaea. Further evidence, including a temple, coins, and bullae, suggests that several deities were particularly worshipped at Abila, mainly Herakles, possibly in a syncretic form as Herakles-Malqart, combined with iconographic aspects of Dionysus; as well as Tyche and Athena. Rock-cut tombs from the 2nd-3rd centuries discovered nearby partly display elaborate mural paintings.

=== Byzantine and Early Muslim periods ===
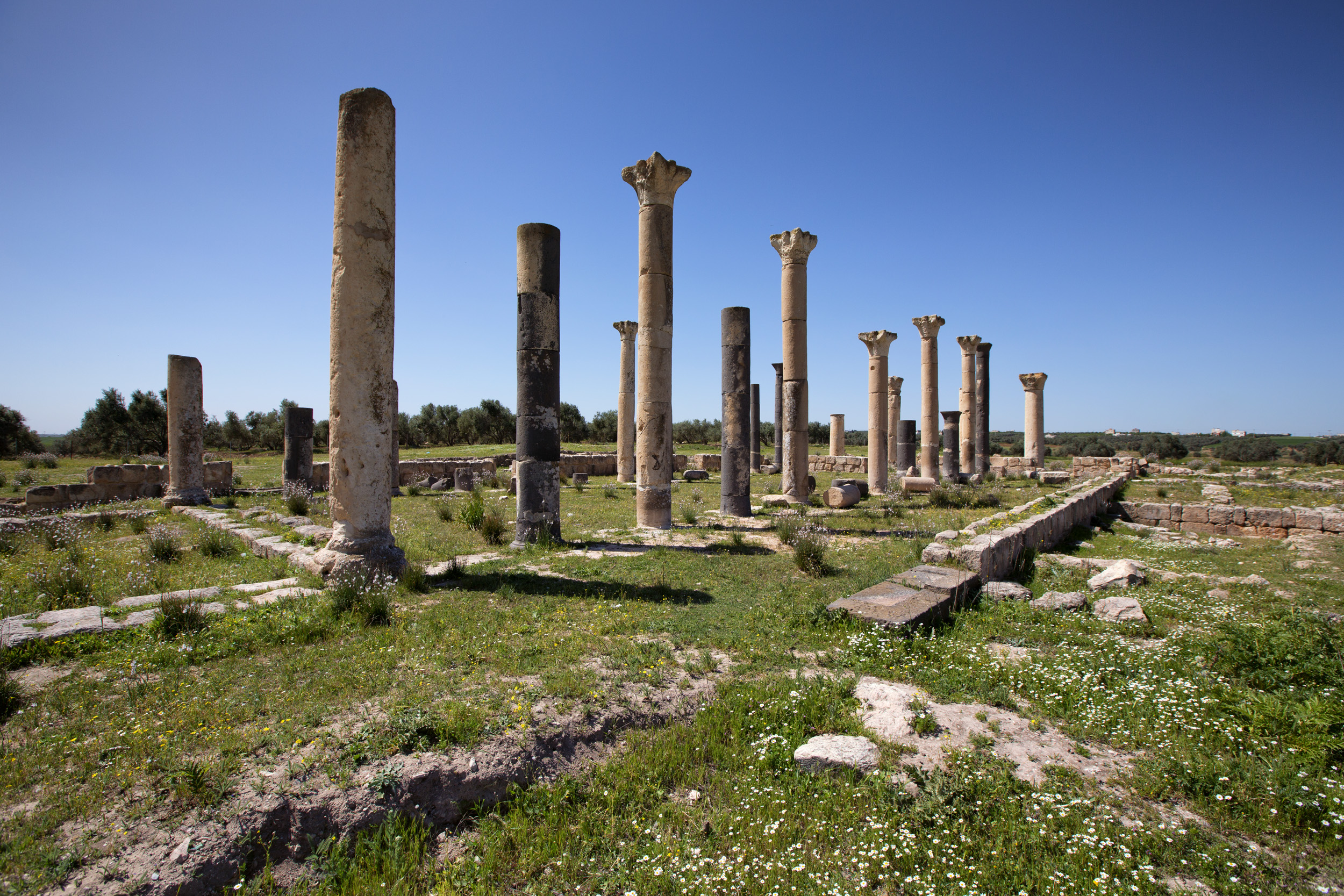
Sixth century church found on Tell Abila

Abila continued to thrive in the Byzantine period and became a prominent regional Christian centre, as proven by the presence of several large churches. Further evidence has shown that the site was used for Christian worship from at least the seventh- to eighth-century.

Destruction visited upon the city by either war (the conquest by Persian armies in 614) or the earthquake of 633 led to a period of abandonment.

The site was again inhabited in the Umayyad period, when a large building was erected over the ruins of the theatre. There was repeated destruction caused by the 749 earthquake.

==== Bishopric ====
Abila was a Christian episcopal see and, since it was part of the late Roman province of Palaestina Secunda, it is distinguished from another town and bishopric of the same name in the province of Phoenicia by being called Abila in Palaestina.

The names of three of its bishops are given in extant contemporary documents. In 518, Solomon signed the synodal letter of Patriarch John of Jerusalem Severus of Antioch. Nicostratus signed the acts of the synod of the three Palestine provinces that Patriarch Peter called in 536 against Patriarch Anthimus I of Constantinople. Alexander was deposed in 553 for refusing to sign the decisions of a council of Jerusalem against the Origenists; exiled to Constantinople, he died there in an earthquake in 557.

No longer a residential bishopric, Abila is today listed by the Catholic Church as a titular see.

== Ecological threats ==
The main threats to the site have been identified as development pressures, insufficient management, unsustainable tourism, water erosion (rain and spring). Both urban and agricultural development pressures are increasing in the area, due to its fertile soil, gentle climate and water availability. Tourism is unmonitored and there are little interpretation and no facilities provided for tourists. The site is not expected to be a large tourism draw given its proximity to the more popular Umm Qais site.

== See also ==
- List of titular sees
- Abila (Peraea)
- List of ancient Greek cities

== Sources ==
- Bennett, Claire; Rathjen, Tanja (2004). "Analysis of Abila, Jordan, from an archaeological perspective" (PDF). Study Project "Landscape Archaeology" (Report). Faculty of Archaeology and Anthropology (Yarmouk University), Brandenburg University of Technology.
- Contreras, Daniel A.; Brodie, Neil. "Quantifying Destruction: An evaluation of the utility of publicly-available satellite imagery for investigating looting of archaeological sites in Jordan". Journal of Field Archaeology. 35: 101–114. doi:10.1179/009346910x12707320296838. S2CID 129799683.
- Darabseh, Fakhrieh Majed Qasim (July 2010). "Chapter Seven: Abila of the Decapolis" (PDF). A Strategy for the Development of a Tourist Trail of the Decapolis Sites in Northern Jordan (PhD). University of Birmingham.
- Downes, Nigel; Sezgin, Ahmet (2004). "Reconstruction and tourism planning in the Decapolis region" (PDF). Study Project "Landscape Archaeology" (Report). Faculty of Archaeology and Anthropology (Yarmouk University), Brandenburg University of Technology.
- Fuller, Neathery; Fuller, Michael (September 16, 2010). "Abila of the Decapolis, Jordan".
- Khries, Nour Ismail (2010). Geoenvironmental Evaluation in Abila Archaeological Site (Umm Al A'mad Basilica) in Jordan (PDF) (Master Thesis in Applied and Environmental Geology). Aristotle University Of Thessaloniki.
- Schumacher, Gottlieb (1889). Abila of the Decapolis. Palestine exploration fund. [Publications]. London: Palestine Exploration Fund.
- Talbert, Richard (2000). Barrington Atlas of the Greek and Roman World. p. 69. ISBN 0-691-03169-X.
- Ting, Chen (2004). "Value-based archaeological site management – A case study from Abila in Jordan" (PDF). Study Project "Landscape Archaeology" (Report). Faculty of Archaeology and Anthropology (Yarmouk University), Brandenburg University of Technology.
