= Pope John II =

Head of the Catholic Church from 533 to 535

- Bishop of Rome
- Church: Catholic Church
- Papacy began: 2 January 533
- Papacy ended: 8 May 535
- Predecessor: Boniface II
- Successor: Agapetus I

Personal details
- Born: Mercurius c. 475 Rome, Italy, Western Roman Empire
- Died: 8 May 535 (aged 59–60) Rome, Ostrogothic Kingdom
- Buried: St. Peter's Basilica

Pope John II (Latin: Ioannes II; c. 475 – 8 May 535), born Mercurius, was the Bishop of Rome from 2 January 533 to his death on 8 May 535. As a priest at St. Clement's Basilica, he endowed that church with gifts and commissioned stone carvings for it. Mercurius became the first pope to adopt a new papal name upon his elevation to the office. During his pontificate, John II notably removed Bishop Contumeliosus of Riez from his office, convened a council on the readmission of Arian clergy, and approved an edict of emperor Justinian, promulgating doctrine opposed by his predecessor, Pope Hormisdas.

== Early life ==
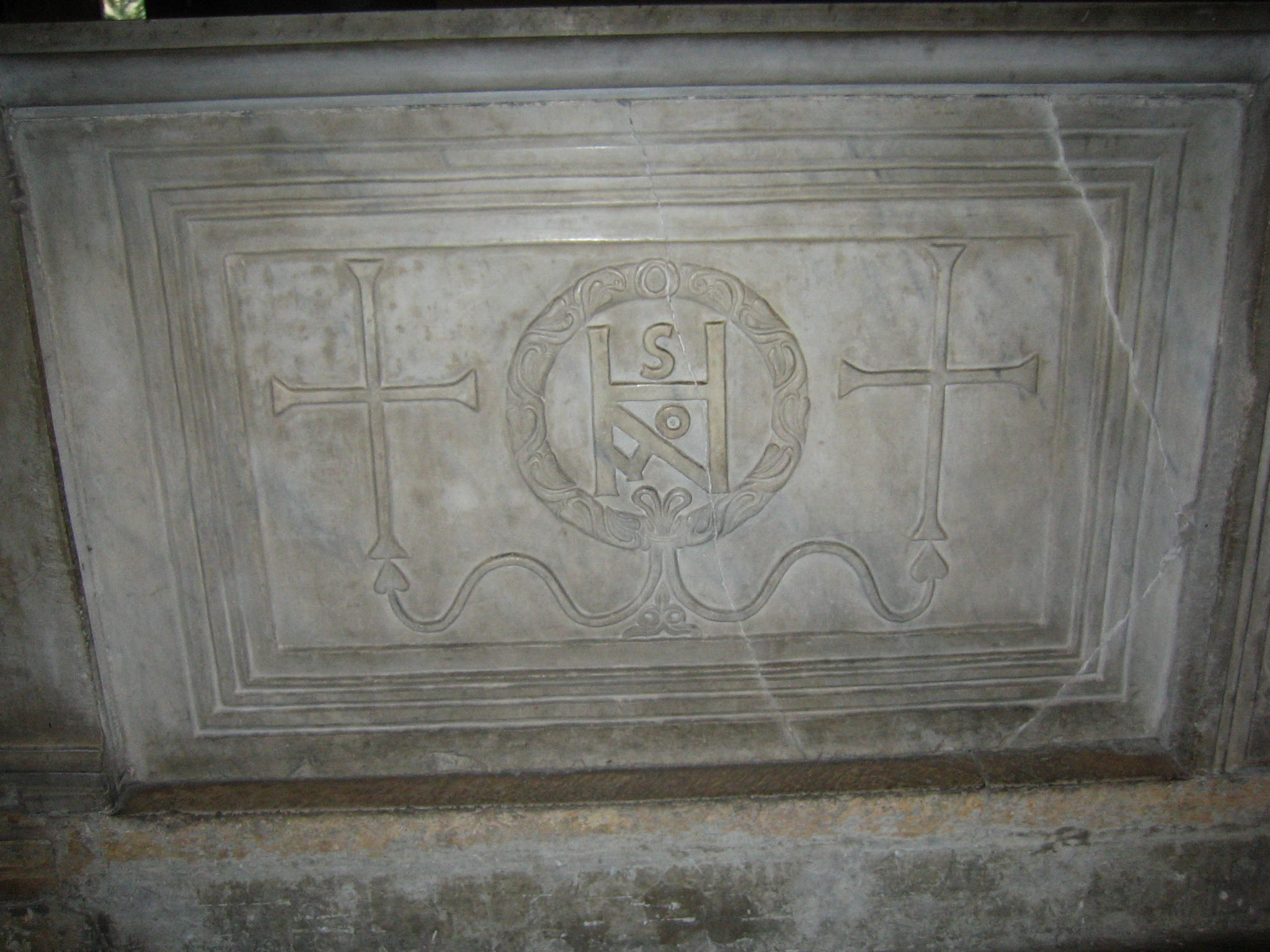
A monogram of John II on a marble slab in St. Clement's Basilica

Mercurius was born in Rome, son of Praeiectus. He became a priest at St. Clement's Basilica on the Caelian Hill, and even before becoming pope he had commissioned work for the basilica and made generous donations. The basilica still retains memorials of "Johannes surnamed Mercurius"; he donated sculpted balustrades (plutei) and carved marble transennae, grates or screens that partitioned the space without blocking light. A reference to "Presbyter Mercurius" appears on a fragment of an ancient ciborium, and his monogram, in the style of the sixth century, is found on several marble slabs that enclose the schola cantorum.

== Pontificate ==
Mercurius was elected pope on 2 January 533, apparently the first pope to adopt a new name upon elevation to the papacy, perhaps because he had been named after a pagan god.

The notoriously adulterous behavior of Bishop Contumeliosus of Riez caused John to order the bishops of Gaul to confine him in a monastery. Until a new bishop could be appointed, he bade the clergy of Riez to obey the Bishop of Arles.

Stemming from Pope Hormisdas' suppression of the statement "one of the Trinity suffered in the flesh" in Scythian monastic liturgies, the Acoemetae, or Sleepless Monks, began to support Nestorianism. Emperor Justinian I and patriarch Epiphanius of Constantinople opposed this theology and sent a deputation to Rome which prompted John II to assemble a synod, excommunicate the Acoemetae, and issue statements approving the doctrine of the emperor.

=== Arianism ===
In 535, 217 bishops assembled in a council at Carthage submitted to John II a decision about whether bishops who had lapsed into Arianism should, on repentance, keep their rank or be admitted only to lay communion. The question of re-admittance to the lapsed troubled North Africa for centuries (see Novatianism and Donatism). The answer to their question was given by Agapetus I, as John II died on 8 May 535. He was buried in St Peter's Basilica.

== See also ==
- List of popes

Catholic Church titles
Preceded by Boniface II	Pope; 533–535	Succeeded by Agapetus I
