= 588th =

588th may refer to:

- 588th Bombardment Squadron, inactive United States Air Force unit
- 588th Night Bomber Regiment or Night Witches, the female military aviators of the 588th Night Bomber Regiment of the Soviet Air Forces

== See also ==
- 588 (number)
- 588 (disambiguation)
- 588, the year 588 (DLXXXVIII) of the Julian calendar
- 588 BC
