= John IV of Alexandria =

John IV of Alexandria may refer to:

- Patriarch John IV of Alexandria, Greek Patriarch of Alexandria in 569–579
- Pope John IV of Alexandria, ruled in 777–799
