= Metropolis of Derkoi =

The Metropolis of Derkoi (Greek: Ἱερὰ Μητρόπολις Δέρκων) is a residential see of the Eastern Orthodox Church subject to the Ecumenical Patriarch of Constantinople and situated in the Istanbul suburb of Yesilköy (historically San Stefano). The cathedral is that of St. Parakevi in Therapia (Tarabya). The metropolitan is a member of the Patriarchal Synod. The present Metropolitan is Apostolos Daniilidis.

== History ==
The village of Derkos/Derkoi (modern Durusu or Terkos) is attested since Classical Antiquity, but Emperor Anastasius I (r. 491–518) raised it to the status of a city and rebuilt it as a forward stronghold for the defence of Constantinople. Probably at the same time it was created as an episcopal see ("Bishopric of Derkoi and Chele", Επισκοπή Δέρκων και Χηλής). In the first half of the 6th century, the town and the see were known as a stronghold of the Monophysites. The Monophysite ascetic Zoora took refuge there after the Council of Constantinople (536).

The see was a suffragan of the metropolis of Heraclea until the 10th century, when it became an autocephalous archbishopric. Bishop Gregory I took part in the Second Council of Nicaea in 787; Macarius I participated in the council of 879, Archbishop Constantine participated in the anti-Jacobite council of 1030, and an unnamed archbishop took part in the Council of Blachernae against John Italos in 1082. In 1166, Archbishop John II tried repeatedly, but without success, to have his see moved to nearby Philea. An archbishop Michael is attested in a latter of 1177 to the Catholicos of Armenian Cilicia Gregory IV the Young, and an archbishop Gregory in a synod in February 1197. During Latin rule in 1204–47, a Catholic bishop was installed over the see (Derkensem), which was subordinated directly to the Latin Patriarch of Constantinople.

The anonymous archbishop of Derkoi co-signed the Acts of Union with the Catholic Church in July 1274. In 1285, Archbishop Constantine co-signed the tomos against the deposed Patriarch of Constantinople John Bekkos. Archbishop Macarius presided over the see in ca. 1289–94, but it seems to have fallen vacant in the early 14th century: during the patriarchate of Nephon I (1310–14), the proceeds of the see were transferred directly to the patriarchal see and, in April 1316, Metropolitan Theodoulos of Nymphaion was appointed acting administrator (proedros).

The see was restored by March 1324, when Archbishop Loukas is attested, serving at least until 1329. In the same year (1324), the see's annual contributions to the patriarchate were fixed at 24 hyperpyra. Archbishop Gabriel is attested as a signatory of the tomos of 1351, endorsing the views of Gregory Palamas and ending the Hesychast controversy. In 1355, the see was briefly united with the Metropolis of Bizye, under Neophytus.

Following the conquest of Heraclea Pontica by the Ottoman Turks in 1360, in January 1365 the Archbishopric of Derkoi was assigned to the Metropolitan of Heraclea to support him through its proceeds. This lasted until ca. March 1371, when the archbishop is again attested as a separate entity. By September 1379, Derkoi was itself raised to a metropolitan see, with the first metropolitan being Paul, who remained in office at least until May 1384. From February 1389 to October 1400, the see was under Metropolitan Joseph. An anonymous incumbent is attested in 1403, but after that the see probably remained vacant due to the Ottoman devastation of the area until about August 1409, when a new incumbent (Basil) is attested. The last metropolitan before the Fall of Constantinople was Acacius, mentioned in late 1452, shortly before the town itself was captured by the Ottomans.

Under Ottoman rule it was a little village south-west of Karaburun, a promontory on the Black Sea, and on the southern bank of Lake Derkos, the waters of which are brought to Constantinople by an aqueduct. There were about 300 inhabitants. In 1466, it was ruled directly by the Patriarch of Constantinople [Kambouroglou, Monuments for History of Athens (Gr.), II, 354]. It was not re-established until the beginning of the seventeenth century, when the titular resided at Therapia on the Bosporus.

In October 1746, it was raised to the eighth rank of the Greek hierarchy (Mansi, Col. concil., XXXVIII, 527). The diocese included 41 villages in the vicinity of Constantinople and along the shores of the Black Sea and the Sea of Marmara, among them San Stefano, Makriköy and Büyükdere, with Catholic parishes conducted by Capuchins, Dominicans and Minor Conventuals.

In 1821, during the massacre that broke out in Constantinople, as a retaliation of the Greek War of Independence, the metropolitan bishop of Derkoi, Gregory, was among the Greek Orthodox upper clergy that was executed by the Ottoman authorities.

During the anti-Greek Istanbul pogrom, in September 1955, six churches under the jurisdiction of the metropolis of Derkoi were destroyed, while the remaining two church buildings were saved. Moreover, the metropolitan mansion was burnt to the ground by the fanatical mob. Latter, the site that once hosted the metropolitan mansion was appropriated by the Turkish authorities and, in 1958, a hotel was built.

== Sources ==
- Kiminas, Demetrius (2009). The Ecumenical Patriarchate: A History of Its Metropolitanates with Annotated Hierarch Catalogs. Wildside Press LLC. ISBN 9781434458766.
