= Patriarch John IV =

Patriarch John IV may refer to:

- Patriarch John IV of Alexandria, Greek Patriarch of Alexandria in 569–579
- Patriarch John IV of Constantinople, ruled in 582–595
- Patriarch John IV of Antioch (designation contended among various people)
- John IV, Maronite Patriarch (designation contended among various people)
