= Acacius (Alexandria) =

Byzantine military officer in Alexandria from c. 539–540

- Ἀκάκιος
- Military career
- Allegiance: Byzantine
- Rank: Comes rei militaris or tribunus

Acacius (Greek: Ἀκάκιος) was a Byzantine military officer, active in Alexandria during the reign of Justinian I (r. 527–565).

== Life ==
Acacius was a native of Amida, and Zacharias Rhetor calls him "Bar Eshkhofo", which seems to mean "son of a cobbler. Zacharias further reports that after the deposition of Patriarch Paul of Alexandria and his replacement by Zoilus (in 539/540), Acacius was the military officer tasked to protect Zoilus from the hostile population of Alexandria. Acacius was probably a professional soldier, but seems to have held a lower position, perhaps a comes rei militaris or a tribunus (cavalry regimental commander).

== Sources ==
- Hamilton, Frederick John; Brooks, Ernest Waller (1899), The Syriac chronicle known as that of Zachariah of Mitylene, Methuen & co
- Martindale, John R., ed. (1992). The Prosopography of the Later Roman Empire: Volume III, AD 527–641. Cambridge: Cambridge University Press. ISBN 0-521-20160-8.
