= 588 (disambiguation) =

588 may refer to:

- The year 588
- The 588th Night Bomber Regiment, a World War II Soviet women-only combat regiment.
- 588 Achilles, an asteroid.
- Cheongnyangni 588, a red light district in Seoul, South Korea.
- Meadow Lake No. 588, Saskatchewan, a rural municipality in the Canadian province of Saskatchewan.
- Texas House Bill 588

Roads:

- Pennsylvania Route 588
- Highway 588 (Ontario)
- Ohio State Route 588

== See also ==
- 588th (disambiguation)
