= Pontianus Africae =

6th-century bishop from Africa

Pontianus was a sixth-century Christian bishop from an African diocese (not known) and Bishop of Constantinople who was a figure in the Three-Chapter Controversy.

He wrote a critical letter to Emperor Justinian in 544–5, in reply to a request for his signature to an edict of condemnation. In it he asked Justinian to withdraw the anathematization of Theodore of Mopsuestia and other Monothelites involved in the matter of the Three Chapters. This letter is extant. He argues that the condemned writings were not known to him, and that dead men shouldn't be damned by the living, which is God's prerogative stating "and what cause have we to enter into a war with the dead, where there is no victory?" In this he ignored precedents for posthumous condemnation. He also argued that the outcome of the Council of Chalcedon of 451, against Eutychianism, should not be undermined.

== Other sources ==
- William Smith and Hery Wace, A Dictionary of Christian Biography, Literature, Sects and Doctrines (1887), vol.IV-1, article p. 438.
