= Augustopolis in Palaestina =

Augustopolis in Palaestina was a city in the Roman province of Palaestina Tertia, whose capital was Petra. It corresponds to the site of Adhruh in modern-day Jordan.

== Description ==
It was also a Christian bishopric. There are documentary records of two of its bishops. One named John took part in the Council of Ephesus of 431. Another of the same name was a signatory of the acts of the council called by Patriarch Peter of Jerusalem in 536 against Patriarch Anthimus I of Alexandria, a council attended by bishops of Palaestina Prima, Palaestina Secunda and Palaestina Tertia.

No longer a residential bishopric, Augustopolis in Palaestina is today listed by the Catholic Church as a titular see.
