= Council of Constantinople (518) =

Christian Church oecumenical council

The council (or synod) of Constantinople that took place in the Great Church on 20 July 518 affirmed the Council of Chalcedon of 451 and denounced its opponents. It was held by the Patriarch John the Cappadocian in response to the pleas of the people following the accession of the Emperor Justin I. This was a decisive shift in the Christological attitude of the imperial church.

An allegedly eyewitness account of the council was incorporated into the Acts of the council of Constantinople of 536 under the title "How the Synods Were Proclaimed in the Church" in the fifth session.

== Bibliography ==
- Forness, Philip Michael (2020). "Representing Lay Involvement in the Christological Controversies: The Acclamations of the People and the Synod of Constantinople (518)". In Wolfram Brandes; Alexandra Hasse-Ungeheuer; Hartmut Leppin (eds.). Konzilien und kanonisches Recht in Spätantike und frühem Mittelalter: Aspekte konziliarer Entscheidungsfindung. De Gruyter. pp. 57–80. doi:10.1515/9783110684377-007.
