= Peter of Apamea =

Peter (Syriac: Peṭrūs or Peṭrā) was the bishop of Apamea from at least 514/515 until his removal in 519.

A protégé of Severus of Antioch, Peter was the only non-Chalcedonian bishop in the province of Syria Secunda and appears to have been the only non-Chalcedonian clergyman in his diocese. He succeeded Cosmas, who resigned. He was present at the Council of Tyre in 514/515, which approved the Henoticon, and at the Council of Antioch in 515/516. He purged the names of Apamea's Chalcedonian bishops from the diptychs of the cathedral of Saint John in Apamea. He sent a force of Isaurians (probably mercenary soldiers) to subdue the Monastery of Saint Maron, which had evidently rebelled against his authority and may have been threatening violence themselves. There were casualties and Peter was accused of using violence to settle religious scores.

On 10 February 518, Peter was anathematized by Pope Hormisdas in a letter to the clergy, deacons and monastic leaders of Syria Secunda. Following the deposition of Severus at the Council of Constantinople in 518, Peter was deposed by a provincial council. The legality of this council is questionable, since it involved the deposition of their superior by a group of inferior clergy. He left Apamea sometime after 6 January 519. Among the accusations against Peter was that he used prostitutes, but this is probably baseless. After he left Apamea, his name was erased from the diptychs and he was considered excommunicated.

Peter went to Constantinople at some point before 535, possibly as early as 532/533. There he preached the Miaphysite doctrine openly against the Chalcedonian. Condemned by the Council of Constantinople in 536, he left the city later that year. The Emperor Justinian I issued a novella condemning Peter as a heretic on 8 August 536. Peter was explicitly prohibited from spreading his doctrine. He was banned from the capital and other major cities and is not heard of again. He probably died not long after 536. He was certainly dead by 544/545 (year 856 of the Seleucid era).

== Bibliography ==
- Harrak, Amir (1995). "Notes on Syriac Inscriptions, I: The Inscription of Maʿar-zaytā (Syria)". Orientalia. 64: 110–119.
- Menze, Volker L. (2008). Justinian and the Making of the Syrian Orthodox Church. Oxford University Press.
