= Hermiana =

Africa Proconsularis (125 AD)

Hermiana was a town in the Roman province of Byzacena. It may have been situated in the plain of Bled Hammiane, and had its own bishop. The diocese is now a titular see of the Catholic Church.

The Latin adjective relating to the episcopal see is Hermianensis.

A bishop of the town was the Church Father, Facundus of Hermiane.

The first titular bishop of the see was appointed on 1 April 1952.
