= Facundus of Hermiane =

Facundus of Hermiana was a 6th-century Christian author, and bishop of Hermiana in North Africa.

About his career little is known. His place in history is due entirely to the opposition which he offered to the condemnation (by the edict of Justinian in 543 or 544) of the "Three Chapters". At the instance of Theodore Ascidas, and with the ostensible purpose of reuniting to the Church the Acephali, a sect of Monophysites, Justinian was induced to censure the "Three Chapters". By this act certain writings of the fifth-century Theodore of Mopsuestia, Theodoret of Cyrus, and Ibas of Edessa were condemned.

Facundus was in Constantinople when this censure was pronounced, and shortly after its publication he and several other western bishops refused to subscribe to the decree, alleging that it was an attack on the Council of Chalcedon, which had accepted at least the letter of Ibas to the Persian Maris. This document was especially aimed at the decree of the emperor. Facundus also drew up a memorial in protest, but was prevented from presenting it by the arrival of Pope Vigilius. The conduct of the pontiff and his acquiescence in the condemnation of the "Three Chapters" spurred Facundus to complete this work, which he entitled Pro Defensione Trium Capitulorum.

It is not known when the work was completed nor when it was presented to the emperor, so that nothing can be said of its immediate effect on the controversy. After its publication Facundus was compelled to flee from Constantinople and find safety in concealment. Because of the attitude of Vigilius in acceding to the emperor's insistence that he subscribe to the censure of the "Three Chapters", Facundus and many African bishops cut themselves off from communion with him.

This schism lasted for many years, and during that time Facundus wrote two other works at the request of his fellow-bishops, in response to reproaches of insubordination (Liber contra Mocianum Scholasticum and Epistola Fidei Catholicae in defensione trium capitulorum).
