= Contumeliosus of Riez =

Deposed Bishop of Riez in Gaul in the 6th century

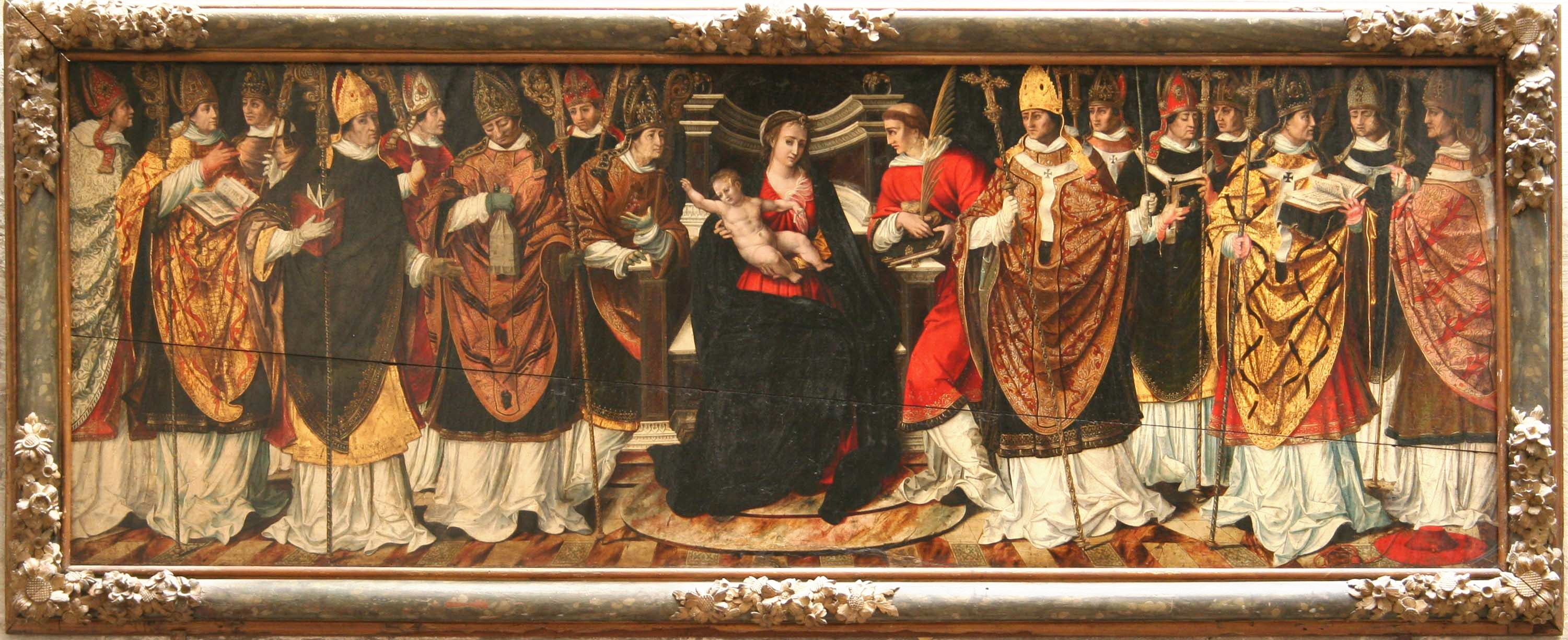
provincial council representing probably the condemnation of the bishop Contumeliosus, sixth from the left

Contumeliosus of Riez was a sixth century Bishop of Riez in Gaul. Pope John II deposed Contumeliosus in 534 for adulterous behaviour and authorized Caesarius of Arles to appoint a temporary bishop to the diocese. Contumeliosus' deposition is notable for being the first act of jurisdiction of this kind recorded of a bishop of Rome.

== Life and death ==
Contumeliosus was the bishop of Riez in Gaul, and a sufficiently learned man that Bishop Avitus of Vienne forwarded to him some of his works for editing. Contumeliosus was accused of adultery and alienation of church property. At a Council of Marseilles, convened in 533 by Caesarius, Metropolitan Archbishop of Arles, Contumeliosus admitted to the charges and was deposed. Archbishop Caesarius then wrote Pope John II regarding the disposition of the case.

In 534, Pope John wrote to Caesarius, to the bishops of Gaul, and to the clergy of Riez, directing the guilty bishop be confined to a monastery where he might perform an appropriate penance. No time period was apparently specified. John's successor, Pope Agapetus I, accepted an appeal from Contumeliosus, and he ordered Caesarius of Arles to grant the accused a new trial before papal delegates. Agapetus charged Caesarius with cruelty and injustice in his proceedings against Contumeliosus, although he had acted in accord with Gallican usage and had defended the discipline of the Church. Of two surviving letters of John to Caesarius, both dated 18 July 535, one is about the dispute over Contumeliosus (Mansi, viii. p. 856).

== Sources ==
- Schaff-Herzog
- Henry Wace, A Dictionary of Christian Biography: "Agapetus"
- Klingshirn, William E. 1994. Caesarius of Arles: Life, Testament, Letters. Liverpool: Liverpool University Press.
