= James Whelan (bishop) =

Irish-born American Catholic bishop

His Excellency, The Right Reverend James Whelan O.P.
- Bishop of Nashville; Titular Bishop of Diocletianopolis
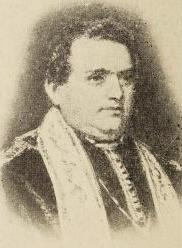
- Church: Catholic Church
- See: Diocese of Nashville
- In office: February 21, 1860 – February 12, 1864
- Predecessor: Richard Pius Miles
- Successor: Patrick Feehan
- Previous posts: Coadjutor Bishop of Nashville (1859 to 1860); Titular Bishop of Marcopolis (1859 to 1864)

Orders
- Ordination: August 2, 1846 by John Baptist Purcell
- Consecration: May 8, 1859 by Peter Richard Kenrick

Personal details
- Born: December 8, 1823 Kilkenny, Ireland
- Died: February 18, 1878 (aged 54) Zanesville, Ohio, U.S.
- Motto: In cruce salus (In salvation on the cross)

James Whelan, O.P. (December 8, 1823 – February 18, 1878) was an Irish-born prelate of the Catholic Church. He served as the second bishop of the Diocese of Nashville in Tennessee from 1860 to 1864. Whelan was a member of the Dominican Order.

== Biography ==
=== Early life ===
James Whelan was born in Kilkenny, Ireland on December 8, 1823. He family immigrated to the United States when he was age 10 or 12, settling in New York. He joined the Dominican Order in 1839 at the novitiate in Springfield, Kentucky, and made his profession in 1842. He studied philosophy and theology at the Dominican convent at Somerset, Ohio.

=== Priesthood ===
Whelan was ordained a priest in Somerset for the Dominican Order by Bishop John Purcell on August 2, 1846. The Dominicans assigned Whelan to missionary work until 1852, when he was appointed president of St. Joseph's College in Somerset. In 1854, Whelan became provincial superior of St. Joseph's Province (which included all the United States except the Pacific Coast).

=== Coadjutor Bishop and Bishop of Nashville ===
On April 15, 1859, Whelan was appointed coadjutor bishop of Nashville and Titular Bishop of Marcopolis by Pope Pius IX. He received his episcopal consecration on May 8, 1859, from Archbishop Peter Kenrick, with Bishops John Miège and Henry Juncker serving as co-consecrators, at the Cathedral of St. Louis in St. Louis, Missouri.

Whelan succeeded Bishop Richard Miles as bishop of Nashville upon the latter's death on February 21, 1860. Whelan requested the Dominican Sisters of St. Mary in Somerset establish a school in his diocese. Four sisters opened an academy in 1862 specializing in music and the fine arts. Whelan enlarged the cathedral and established a boarding school, and an orphanage.

As a border state, Tennessee was the scene of some of the most severe battles during the American Civil War . While passing through the front line after a visit with Bishop Martin Spalding in Louisville, Whelan was accused of making remarks within Union lines which the Confederates thought had influenced the movements of the Union Army.

=== Resignation and legacy ===
The suspicions of his political loyalties coupled with the stresses of being bishop prompted Whelan to submit his resignation as bishop of Nashville to the Vatican. On September 23, 1863, Pius IX accepted his resignation and on February 12, 1864, appointed him as Titular Bishop of Diocletianopolis in Palaestina.

Whelan briefly retired to St. Joseph's Convent before taking up residence at St. Thomas Parish in Zanesville, Ohio. He devoted his time to theological, historical, and chemical studies, and published a defense of papal infallibility in 1871.

James Whelan died on February 18, 1878, at age 54, in Zanesville.

== Publications ==
Defense of papal infallibiliy

== Episcopal succession ==
Catholic Church titles
Preceded by Richard Pius Miles, O.P.	Bishop of Nashville; 1860–1864	Succeeded by Patrick Feehan
