= Patriarch Apollinarius of Alexandria =

6th-century patriarch of Alexandria

Apollinarius served as Greek Patriarch of Alexandria between 551 and 569. Before his appointment by Justinian I, he was a reader of the monastery of Salama. According to both Chalcedonian and Non-Chalcedonian sources, he killed over 200,000 Coptic Christians during his reign.

== Sources ==
- "Apollinarius (551–569)". Official web site of the Greek Orthodox Patriarchate of Alexandria and All Africa.
- Ghattas, Mary (2017). "Toward the Localization of the Hennaton Monastic Complex". In Gawdat Gabra; Hany N. Takla (eds.). Christianity and Monasticism in Northern Egypt: Beni Suef, Giza, Cairo, and the Nile Delta. American University in Cairo Press.

Preceded by Zoilus	Greek Patriarch of Alexandria; 551–569	Succeeded by John IV
