= Diocletianopolis (Palestine) =

Palestinian city

Diocletianopolis (Ancient Greek: Διοκλητιανούπολις) was a city near Ascalon. It was given the status of a city under the name Diocletianopolis as part of a Roman policy of urbanization, what had been the territory of Ascalon was divided into three municipal districts, those of Ascalon, Maiumas Ascalon, and Diocletianopolis. Ken Butcher says that what was given the name Diocletianopolis was the port of Ascalon.

== History ==
This arrangement occurred probably in the reign of Diocletian (284–311). so that the city of Diocletianopolis then belonged to the Roman province of Syria Palaestina. In about 390, it became part of the newly created province of Palestina Prima, which had Caesarea Maritima as capital.

Diocletianopolis was also called Sarafia a name that survives in the present name of Khirbat al-Sharaf or Khirbat al-Ashraf and that Christians seem to have preferred to the official name that recalled the persecuting emperor.

== Ecclesiastical History ==
Diocletianopolis was a Christian episcopal see by the mid-4th century, but the only bishop of the see who is known by name is Eliseus, who took part in the Semi-Arian synod of Seleucia in 359.

=== Titular see ===
No longer a residential diocese, the bishopric is today listed by the Catholic Church as a titular see.

The diocese was initially (18th century?) restored nominally under the name Diocletianopolis, only in 1933 the titular bishopric was renamed Diocletianopolis in Palæstina.

It is vacant, having had the following incumbent, all of the lowest (episcopal) rank :

- Bazilije Božičković, Basilian Order of Saint Josaphat (O.S.B.M., Byzantine Rite Eastern Catholic) (1759.09.04 – 1777.06.17)
- Johann Michael Josef von Pidoll de Quitenbach (1794.02.21 – 1802.05.25)
- Johann Michael Leonhard (1836.02.01 – 1863.01.19)
- James Whelan, Dominican order (O.P.) (1864.02.12 – 1878.02.18)
- Anton Johann Zerr (1883.03.15 – 1889.12.30)
- Fedele Abati, Friars Minor (O.F.M.) (1890.06.06 – 1915.04.08)
- Antônio Augusto de Assis (1918.08.02 – 1922.02.24), as Auxiliary Bishop of Mariana (Brazil) (1918.08.02 – 1931.07.31); previously Titular Bishop of Sura (1907.07.10 – 1909.11.29), Coadjutor Bishop of Pouso Alegre (Brazil) (1907.07.10 – 1909.11.29), succeeding as Bishop of Pouso Alegre (1909.11.29 – 1916.02.07), Bishop of Guaxupé (Brazil) (1916.02.07 – 1918.08.02); later Titular Archbishop of Berytus (1922.02.24 – 1931.07.31), Bishop of Jaboticabal (Brazil) (1931.07.31 – 1961.02.07)
- Gerard Vesters, Sacred Heart Missionaries (M.S.C.) (1923.02.16 – 1954.08.30)
- Aníbal Maricevich Fleitas (1957.02.05 – 1965.12.04)

== Source and External links ==
- GigaCatholic, with titular incumbent biography links
