= Council of Constantinople (536) =

The Council of Constantinople was a conference of the endemic synod held in Constantinople, the capital of the Eastern Roman Empire, in May–June 536. It confirmed the deposition of the Patriarch Anthimus I of Constantinople and condemned three prominent anti-Chalcedonians living in Constantinople, causing the Emperor Justinian I to ban all four from the capital. The Council of Jerusalem held in September was convoked to condemn the same four as heretics. The condemned were the deposed Patriarch Severus of Antioch, the deposed Bishop Peter of Apamea and the monk Zoora.

== Background ==
The council had its roots in the Chalcedonian–Miaphysite controversy that peaked in Constantinople in 535–536 under Patriarch Anthimus I of Constantinople, who was accused of having Miaphysite sympathies. The Chalcedonians launched a campaign for his removal and condemnation. Four concerned monks of Palestine sent a petition to the Emperor Justinian I. A further 96 signed a petition to Pope Agapetus I. Finally, 47 bishops and clerics endoumentes (resident) in Constantinople sent a petition to the pope.

Agapetus arrived in Constantinople in February or March 536 on a diplomatic mission for the Ostrogothic king Theodahad. He refused to receive communion with Anthimus ostensibly on the grounds that the latter had been elected uncanonically. While this was true—he had transferred from the diocese of Trebizond—the real reason for the pope's refusal was probably his suspicions of the patriarch's theology. Agapetus may even have excommunicated the Empress Theodora, as Liberatus thought. Lacking support from the emperor, who had called for a council to meet in Constantinople in May, Anthimus resigned. He was replaced by Menas, who was consecrated by Agapetus on March 13. Shortly after, Justinian issued an order (keleusis) to the new patriarch to convoke a synod to investigate Anthimus.

It is probable that the removal of Anthimus had been planned for some time since the participation of Palestinian monks in the synod would only have been possible had they been apprised of the council before the arrival of the pope in Constantinople. As it went, they did not receive a formal invitation from the emperor until after Menas' election, when they must have already been on their way. The pope died suddenly in Constantinople on April 22.

== Meetings ==
The synod met in the church of the Theotokos in Chalkoprateia. Five sessions were held. The first took place on 2 May with 62 participants and 87 Palestinian monks as witnesses, the second on 6 May with 64 participants and 87 Palestinian monks, the third on 10 May with 77 participants and 91 monks, the fourth on 21 May with 75 participants (but 76 signing the acts) and 93 monks and the fifth on 4 June with 62 participants (but 93 signatories). At the final session, three short books (libelloi) in support of the condemnations were read into the record: one by the bishops to Justinian (7 signatories), one by the monks to Justinian (97 signatories) and one by the monks to Menas (139 signatories). There were about sixty bishops present from the Greek East, all in Constantinople before the council was called. In addition, there were five bishops from Italy, sent by Agapetus before he decided to go to Constantinople himself. Among the lower clergy from Italy who were present at the council with their bishops was the future Pope Pelagius I. The five Italian bishops plus Pelagius and the deacon Theophanes subscribed the acts of the council in Latin, while the bishops of Circesium and Gabboula subscribed in Syriac.

Although Anthimus was summoned to appear several times, he never did. Along with Severus of Antioch, another prominent Miaphysite, he remained in the Palace of Hormisdas under the protection of Theodora. The assembled clergy, monks and bishops issued a series of condemnations of the teachings of Anthimus, Severus, Peter of Apamea and Zooras of Amida. Anthimus took up all of the first three sessions and most of the fourth, at which he was condemned. At the end of the fourth session, Severus, Peter and Zooras came under attack. The fifth session deals exclusively with Severus and Peter. The minutes of the sessions are extensive and are preserved in the Collectio Sabbaitica. A synod held at Jerusalem on 19 September continued the work of that of Constantinople and the acts of both synods are combined in the manuscripts.

In response to the council, on August 6 Justinian issued an imperial rescript (diataxis) declaring Anthimus, Severus, Peter and Zooras to be heretics and prohibiting them from living in Constantinople. This rescript was incorporated into the Novellae Constitutiones as number 42.

A unique Syriac account of the council is found in the Melkite Chronicle of 641.

== Bibliography ==
- Brimioulle, Patrick (2020). Das Konzil von Konstantinopel 536. Franz Steiner Verlag.
- Kaufhold, Hubert (2012). "Sources of Canon Law in the Eastern Churches". In Wilfried Hartmann; Kenneth Pennington (eds.). The History of Byzantine and Eastern Canon Law to 1500. Catholic University of America Press. pp. 215–342.
- Menze, Volker L. (2008). Justinian and the Making of the Syrian Orthodox Church. Oxford University Press.
- Millar, Fergus (2008). "Rome, Constantinople and the Near Eastern Church under Justinian: Two Synods of CE 536". The Journal of Roman Studies. 98: 62–82. JSTOR 20430666.
- Millar, Fergus (2009). "Linguistic Co-existence in Constantinople: Greek and Latin (and Syriac) in the Acts of the Synod of 536 CE". The Journal of Roman Studies. 99: 92–103. JSTOR 40599741.
- Potter, David (2015). Theodora: Actress, Empress, Saint. Oxford University Press.
- Speigl, Jakob [in German] (1994). "Die Synode von 536 in Konstantinopel". Ostkirchliche Studien. 43 (2): 105–153.
