= John III (bishop of Jerusalem) =

Bishop

John III, was a 6th Century bishop of Jerusalem.

John of Jerusalem was the son of a certain Marcian, who was bishop of Sebaste in Samaria. He was bishop in 516–524 AD.

John III anathematized all the opponents of the Council of Chalcedon. He died on April 20, 524, according to Cyril of Scythopolis. The feast of John III, together with that of the Emperor Marcian (450–457) was in the Church of the Apostles on July 9, according to the Palestinian-Georgian calendar.

Religious titles
Preceded by Elias I	Patriarch of Jerusalem; 516–524	Succeeded by Peter
