= Epiphanius of Constantinople =

Patriarch of Constantinople from 520 to 535

- Patriarch of Constantinople
- Installed: 25 February 520
- Term ended: 5 June 535
- Predecessor: John Cappadocia
- Successor: Anthimus I of Constantinople

Personal details
- Died: 5 June 535
- Denomination: Chalcedonian Christianity

Epiphanius of Constantinople (also Epiphanios; Greek: Ἐπιφάνιος; died 5 June 535) was the patriarch of Constantinople from 25 February 520 to 5 June 535, succeeding John Cappadocia.

== Biography ==
The Byzantine Empire experienced a period of significant growth and success due to the military victories achieved by its generals, Belisarius and Narses. As part of the empire's religious policies, efforts were made to suppress idolatry, leading to the burning of pagan books, destruction of images, and imprisonment and flogging of adherents of the old religion. During the patriarchate of Epiphanius in Constantinople, Emperor Justinian I demonstrated his strong commitment to church affairs through the introduction of laws regulating episcopal elections and duties. These enactments, along with the compliance of Epiphanius and his clergy, indicate the absence of exclusive clerical legislation for spiritual matters at that time.

Epiphanius initially held the position of overseeing the catechumens in Constantinople. In 519, a year prior to his election, he was sent, along with John Cappadocia and count Licinius, to Macedonia to collect documents known as "libellos" or subscriptions from those seeking reunification with the Catholic Church, upon the request of Dorotheus, bishop of Thessalonica's apocrisiarius.

On 25 February 520, Epiphanius was elected bishop by Emperor Justin I, with the consent of bishops, monks, and the people. In a letter from the synod of Constantinople to Pope Hormisdas, Epiphanius is described as someone who held the correct faith and exhibited a fatherly concern for orphans.

Epiphanius accepted the peace conditions previously established between the East and West by his predecessor, Patriarch John Cappadocia, and Pope Hormisdas, and ratified them at a council held in Constantinople. At the same council, he also affirmed the decrees of Chalcedon. Antipope Dioscorus, the representative of Pope Hormisdas in Constantinople, noted Epiphanius's promising words but remained uncertain about his ability to fulfill them, as he had not yet requested communion with the pope. Four letters from Epiphanius to Hormisdas have survived, in which he informs the pope of his election, sends him his creed, and declares his condemnation of those whose names the pope had forbidden to be mentioned in the diptychs.

Epiphanius adhered to the symbols of Nicaea, the decrees of Ephesus, Constantinople, and Chalcedon, as well as the letters of Pope Leo I in defense of the faith. Accompanying his second letter to the pope were several gifts, including a gold chalice adorned with precious stones, a gold patina, a silver chalice, and two silk veils, which he presented to the Roman church. In his effort to ensure widespread peace, he advised the pope to show leniency in removing the names of former bishops from the diptychs. His excuse for the bishops of Pontus, Asia, and the East was expressed in eloquent language. The responses from Hormisdas can be found in the Acts of the Council of Constantinople held under Menas of Constantinople, where he expresses trust in Epiphanius's prudence and experience and recommends leniency towards those who are returning while advocating for severity towards the obstinate. Epiphanius was tasked with finalizing the reunification process himself.

The strict measures implemented by Emperor Justin to establish Catholic supremacy in the East provoked Theodoric the Great, the Arian and Ostrogothic ruler of Italy, to retaliate in the West. Pope John I, who succeeded Hormisdas, became concerned, and in 525, he traveled to Constantinople in response to Theodoric's demands to revoke the edict against the Arians and restore their churches (according to Marcellinus Comes).

Pope John I received great honor during his visit to the Eastern capital. The people greeted him twelve miles outside the city, carrying ceremonial tapers and crosses. Emperor Justin prostrated himself before the pope and expressed a desire to be crowned by his hand. Patriarch Epiphanius invited the Pope to celebrate Mass, but due the traditional policy of encroachment, the Pope refused to proceed until he was offered the primary seat. With great solemnity, the Pope conducted the Latin office on Easter Day, communing with all the bishops of the East except for Patriarch Timothy IV of Alexandria, a staunch opponent of Chalcedon.

In 531, the dispute between Rome and Constantinople was reignited by the appeal of Stephen, the metropolitan of Larissa, to Pope Boniface II, contesting a decision made by Epiphanius. Despite Stephen's appeal, he was eventually deposed.

Epiphanius died after an episcopate of 15 years and 3 months. The information available about him portrays him in a positive light. In addition to his letters to Hormisdas, we also have records of the council's ruling against Severus of Antioch and Peter III of Alexandria. Epiphanius is attributed with forty-five canons.

== Notes and references ==
=== Attribution ===
Titles of Chalcedonian Christianity
| Preceded by John of Cappadocia | Patriarch of Constantinople; 520 – 535 | Succeeded by Anthimus I |
