= Patriarch Zoilus of Alexandria =

6th-century Greek patriarch of Alexandria

Zoilus served as Greek Patriarch of Alexandria between 541 and 551.

Zacharias Rhetor reports on how Patriarch Paul of Alexandria was involved in a murder. He was consequently deposed and replaced by Zoilus (in 539/540). Acacius was the military officer tasked to protect Zoilus from the hostile population of Alexandria. Zacharia details: "Ephraim of Antioch was sent to Alexandria, and Abraham Bar Khili [accompanied him]; and, as they passed through Palestine, they took with them a monk named Zoilus. And they went to Alex[andria and] investigated the action of Paul;and they drove him from his see and enthroned Zoilus, a Synodite, in the city: and in order to protect this man from the violence [of] the people of the city, they appointed Acacius Bar Eshkhofo of Amida tribune of the Romans there."

== Bibliography ==
- Hamilton, Frederick John; Brooks, Ernest Waller (1899). The Syriac chronicle known as that of Zachariah of Mitylene. Methuen & co.

| Preceded by Paul | Greek Patriarch of Alexandria; 541–551 | Succeeded by Apollinarius |
