= David Stone Potter =

American classical historian (born 1957)

David S. Potter
- Born: David Stone Potter; 1957 (age 68–69); Cambridge, Massachusetts, U.S.
- Spouse: Ellen Ann Bauerle
- Awards: The Cory Prize (1979); The Conington Prize (1988); John H. D'Arms Award (2005)

Academic background
- Education: Harvard University; Oxford University

David Stone Potter (born 1957) is the Francis W. Kelsey Collegiate Professor of Greek and Roman History and the Arthur F. Thurnau Professor, Professor of Greek and Latin in Ancient History at The University of Michigan. Potter is a graduate of Harvard (A.B. 1979) and Oxford (D.Phil. 1984) universities and specializes in Greek and Roman Asia Minor, Greek, and Latin historiography and epigraphy, Roman public entertainment, and the study of ancient warfare.

== Life and education ==
Potter is the son of H. David Potter and Elizabeth S. Potter. His mother Elizabeth was a science teacher, and his father David spent most of his career at the Newmont Mining Corporation and the law firm Tofel, Berelson, and Saxl. For high school, David Potter attended Phillips Exeter Academy in Exeter, New Hampshire. Potter then attended Harvard University where he was voted into Phi Beta Kappa. He received his DPhil in ancient history from Oxford University.

== Career ==
Potter began his professorial career as a Salvesen Junior Research Fellow at New College, Oxford, before joining the Department of Latin at Bryn Mawr College as a visiting assistant professor between 1984 and 1986. In 1986 he began working for the University of Michigan's Classics Department as an assistant professor. He was awarded an Arthur F. Thurnau professorship in 1996, which "is awarded annually to tenured faculty who have made outstanding contributions to undergraduate education at the University of Michigan and who have had a demonstrable impact on the intellectual development and lives of their students." In 2018 Potter spent a year as the UCLA Ronald J. Mellor Professor of Roman History.

== Scholarship ==
He has written and edited several books and articles about empire, politics, sports, and entertainment in the ancient world. He has also written many opinion columns and letters to the editor about ancient Rome to a range of outlets including CNN, Financial Times and Huffington Post. In some of these letters, Potter connects his expertise on ancient Rome to contemporary politics and crises. He has also reached the public with his historical knowledge through appearances on various media platforms including NBC's The Today Show, CNN, The History Channel and a range of local radio stations. In an interview about why Potter works to reach the public with historical information, he said that "it's sort of an extension of teaching. You're reaching out to a different audience, and I think it's important to reach as many people as you can." Using media appearances to make ancient history applicable to the present moment for the public is one of his goals with his publicly available contributions.

In one of his first published books, Prophets and Emperors: Human and Divine Authority from Augustus to Theodosius, Potter explored "how prophecy worked, how it could empower, and how the diverse inhabitants of the Roman Empire used it to make sense of their world." Potter's book, The Roman Empire at Bay, AD 180–395, is the seventh book in publisher Routledge's eight-part series on the history of the Ancient World. Routledge writes that this volume "is the only one-volume history of the critical years 180–395 AD, which saw the transformation of the Roman Empire from a unitary state centered on Rome, into a new polity with two capitals and a new religion—Christianity."

== Reception ==
David Potter's work has been reviewed and commented upon by other historians in numerous academic journals.

The second edition of his book, The Roman Empire at Bay, AD 180–395, has been reviewed by many. Historian David Neal Greenwood describes Potter's method of historical analysis as choosing "select key individuals that dominated an era, including emperors, intellectuals, and religious leaders, and use them as a lens through which to examine the period at hand." Greenwood also notes that the range of time of which Potter is writing history is useful because it "straddles and engages periods of great transformation, rather than allowing the work to be demarcated by it, thereby treating the Roman Empire as a continuous and evolving organization."

One of the reviews of his book, The Victor's Crown: A History of Ancient Sport from Homer to Byzantium, recognizes the broad scope with which he does historical analysis. This enables Potter to write about sports and spectatorship in the ancient world over a great variation of time and space. The reviewer, historian James Lunt, points out that "the discussion of athletics within the vast extent of Bronze Age, Greek, and Roman history makes for occasionally clumsy generalizations and distracting diversions." The scope of this book is also commented on by another reviewer, historian Donald G. Kyle, who wrote that "few scholars would attempt a work of such chronological and geographical scope, from Homeric funeral games to the “classical” athletic contests of Greece, and from Roman spectacles to Byzantine chariot races."

== Bibliography ==
=== Selected books ===
- Prophecy and History in the Crisis of the Roman Empire: A Historical Commentary on the Thirteenth Sibylline Oracle. Oxford Classical Monographs. Oxford: New York: Clarendon Press; Oxford University Press, 1990.
- Prophets and Emperors: Human and Divine Authority from Augustus to Theodosius. Revealing Antiquity; 7. Cambridge, Mass.: Harvard University Press, 1994.
- Literary Texts and the Roman Historian. Approaching the Ancient World. London; New York: Routledge, 1999.
- The Roman Empire at Bay, AD 180–395, London: Routledge, 2004; 2nd edition, 2014.
- Emperors of Rome: Imperial Rome from Julius Caesar to the Last Emperor. London: Quercus, 2008. ISBN 9781847245526
- Rome in the Ancient World: From Romulus to Justinian. London: Thames and Hudson Ltd, 2016.
- The Victor's Crown: A History of Ancient Sport from Homer to Byzantium. Oxford; New York: Oxford University Press, 2012.
- Constantine the Emperor. Cary: Oxford University Press, Incorporated, 2012.
- Theodora : Actress, Empress, Saint. Women in Antiquity. New York, NY: Oxford University Press, 2015.
- The Origin of Empire: Rome from the Republic to Hadrian. First Harvard University Press ed. Cambridge, Massachusetts: Harvard University Press, 2019.
- Disruption: Why Things Change. Oxford; New York: Oxford University Press, 2024.

=== Selected articles ===
- Potter, David. "The Mysterious Arbaces." American Journal of Philology 100, no. 4 (1979): 541–42.
- Potter, David. "Telesphoros, Cousin of Demetrius: A Note on the Trial of Menander." Historia: Zeitschrift Für Alte Geschichte 36, no. 4 (1987): 491–95.
- Potter, David. "Where Did Aristonicus' Revolt Begin?" Zeitschrift Für Papyrologie Und Epigraphik 74 (1988): 293–95.
- Potter, David. "Empty Areas and Roman Frontier Policy." The American Journal of Philology 113, no. 2 (1992): 269–74. doi:10.2307/295560.
- Potter, David. "Holding Out Court in Republican Rome (105-44)." The American Journal of Philology 132, no. 1 (2011): 59–80.
