= Peter of Jerusalem =

Peter of Jerusalem was the Patriarch of Jerusalem from 524 to 544. He held to the Chalcedonian belief.

== Life ==
Patriarch Peter, as John III's successor and following in his Chalcedonian position, convened in September 536 a synod in Jerusalem in which he proclaimed his orthodoxy and adherence to the Council of Chalcedon. He agreed in the deposition of Anthimus I, the Monophysite patriarch of Constantinople who was deposed that year.

Peter also corresponded with Barsanuphius, a famous hermit who lived close to a monastery in Gaza, whom he asked various questions relating to the governance of the Church. This included for instance asking Barsanuphius for guiding principles in choosing adequate candidates for ordination or about how to deal with an influential donor who was pressing him to appoint a lay protégé to a position of the church.

In 544, emperor Justinian issued an edict condemning Theodore of Mopsuestia, Theoderet of Cyrrhus, and Ive of Edessa, who supposedly were Nestorians, but who were never excommunicated and who had died in the fifth century. Peter signed the edict but included a proviso that if it would not be signed by the Pope of Rome, his signature would be invalid. Eventually, the emperor forced the Pope to sign the edict.

Patriarch Peter died in 544.

Religious titles
Preceded by John III	Patriarch of Jerusalem; 524-552	Succeeded by Macarius II
