= Lay communion =

Lay communion is a term applied in the Catholic Church, to describe the status of a cleric who is in communion with the Church, but only with the standing of a lay person. In modern times lay communion is sometimes imposed, but only in exceptional cases.

== Origins ==
The primitive discipline of the Church established a different punishment for certain crimes according as they were committed by laymen or clerics. The former entailed a shorter and ordinarily lighter penance than the latter, which were punished with a special penalty. The layman was excluded from the community of the faithful, the cleric was excluded from the hierarchy and reduced to the lay communion, that is to say, he was forbidden to exercise his functions. The nature of this latter punishment is not quite certain.

According to one opinion, it consisted in excommunication, together with a prohibition to receive the Eucharist; according to another, the penitent was allowed to receive Holy Communion but only with the laity. Canon xv of the so-called Apostolical Canons forbids any priest, residing outside his diocese without authorization, to celebrate the Holy Sacrifice, but grants him permission to receive the Eucharist along with the faithful. The canon lxii ordained that clerics who apostatized during the persecutions were to be received among the laity.

In 251, a letter of Pope Cornelius to Fabius, Bishop of Antioch, informs us that the pope, in presence of all the people received into his communion, but as a layman, one of the bishops guilty of having conferred sacerdotal ordination on the heretic Novatian. A letter of Cyprian of Carthage mentions a certain Trophimus, who was admitted to communion among the laity. There are similar cases, in which we find it stated that the penitent was admitted to receive communion among the laity.

The Council of Elvira (c. 300) which reveals to us in many ways the religious life of an entire ecclesiastical province, in canon lxxvi, about a deacon, mentions the same discipline. This is the most ancient canonical text that speaks of the custom of lay communion.

== Conciliar canons ==
Not citing the Council of Cologne (346) since its authenticity may be questioned, from that time forward there is, in a series of councils, declarations which show conclusively that, when lay communion is mentioned, there is question of the reception of the Eucharist. Besides the Council of Sardica, those of Hippo (393), canon xli; Toledo (400), canon iv; Rome (487) canon ii, are too explicit to admit of any doubt that we have here an established discipline. We may also cite the Councils of Agde (506), canon 1; Lerida (524), canon v; Orléans (538), canon ii.

== Relationship to the Eucharist ==
Speaking generally, the expression "lay communion" does not necessarily imply the idea of the Eucharist, but only the condition of a layman in communion with the Church. But as the Eucharist was granted only to those in communion with the Church, to say that a cleric was admitted to the lay communion is equivalent to saying that he received the Holy Eucharist.

The person who passed from the condition of a penitent to the lay communion, had necessarily to be received by the bishop into the Church, before being admitted to communion. There are no grounds for supposing that this transition implied an intermediate stage in which he who was admitted to the communion was deprived of the Eucharist. This discipline applied not only to those who were guilty of a secret sin, but also to those who had for some time belonged to an heretical sect. But there was no absolute rule, since the Council of Nicæa (325) received back the Novatian clergy without imposing this penalty on them, while we see it enforced in the case of the Donatists.
