= Patriarch Paul of Alexandria =

6th-century Greek patriarch of Alexandria

Patriarch Paul of Alexandria or Paul of Tabennesis was Greek Patriarch of Alexandria between 537 and 542.

He was elected Patriarch in 537 when the Greek Church of Alexandria, which had previously recognized the Miaphysite Theodosius I, then exiled Gainas. He was the first Chalcedonian to be elected Patriarch since 482. He was deposed by the Synod of Gaza, but later reinstated. This election was the final split between the Miaphysite and Chalcedonian lineage in the see of Alexandria, which lasts until today.

According to Procopius, when Justinian made Paul patriarch, he gave him authority over the praefectus Aegypyi, Rhodon. As patriarch, Paul's first act was to have Psoes, a Miaphysite deacon who wrote in Coptic and was a thorn in the government's side, delivered to Rhodon to be tortured to death. The people of Alexandria revolted in fury, and to pacify them Justinian recalled Rhodon and executed him in Constantinople for his role in the martyrdom of Psoes, despite having previously send thirteen dispatches ordering Rhodon to obey Paul. The next governor of Egypt, Liberius, crucified a man named Arsenius who was instrumental in Psoes’ torture and death, avenging Psoes.

== Notes ==
Preceded by Gainas	Greek Patriarch of Alexandria; 537–542	Succeeded by Zoilus
