= Encyclopedia of Ancient Christianity =

Reference work on Christianity

- Original title: Nuovo dizionario patristico e di antichita cristiane
- Language: English
- Subject: Christianity
- Publisher: InterVarsity Press
- Publication date: 2014
- Media type: Print
- OCLC: 856977030

The Encyclopedia of Ancient Christianity is a three-volume work presenting the ancient history of the Christian faith around the world. It was produced by the Institutum Patristicum Augustinianum, edited by Angelo Di Berardino and published by the InterVarsity Press. It contains over three thousand entries on a variety of Christian topics and themes such topic as archaeology, art and architecture, biography, culture, doctrine, ecclesiology, geography, history, philosophy, and theology.

In 2014 it was translated from the Nuovo dizionario patristico e di antichita cristiane (2006-2008), produced by the Institutum Patristicum Augustinianum, under the direction of Angelo Di Berardino, and it updates and expands the 1992 Encyclopedia of the Early Church published by the Oxford University Press and by James Clarke.

== Awards ==
- 2014 Midwest Publishing Association Award of Excellence (Scholarly/Reference).
- 2014 Readers' Choice Awards Honorable Mention.
