= 588 =

Calendar year

588 in various calendars
- Gregorian calendar: 588; DLXXXVIII
- Ab urbe condita: 1341
- Armenian calendar: 37; ԹՎ ԼԷ
- Assyrian calendar: 5338
- Balinese saka calendar: 509–510
- Bengali calendar: −6 – −5
- Berber calendar: 1538
- Buddhist calendar: 1132
- Burmese calendar: −50
- Byzantine calendar: 6096–6097
- Chinese calendar: 丁未年 (Fire Goat); 3285 or 3078 — to — 戊申年 (Earth Monkey); 3286 or 3079
- Coptic calendar: 304–305
- Discordian calendar: 1754
- Ethiopian calendar: 580–581
- Hebrew calendar: 4348–4349
- Hindu calendars
- Vikram Samvat: 644–645
- Shaka Samvat: 509–510
- Kali Yuga: 3688–3689
- Holocene calendar: 10588
- Iranian calendar: 34 BP – 33 BP
- Islamic calendar: 35 BH – 34 BH
- Javanese calendar: 477–478
- Julian calendar: 588; DLXXXVIII
- Korean calendar: 2921
- Minguo calendar: 1324 before ROC 民前1324年
- Nanakshahi calendar: −880
- Seleucid era: 899/900 AG
- Thai solar calendar: 1130–1131
- Tibetan calendar: མེ་མོ་ལུག་ལོ་ (female Fire-Sheep); 714 or 333 or −439 — to — ས་ཕོ་སྤྲེ་ལོ་ (male Earth-Monkey); 715 or 334 or −438

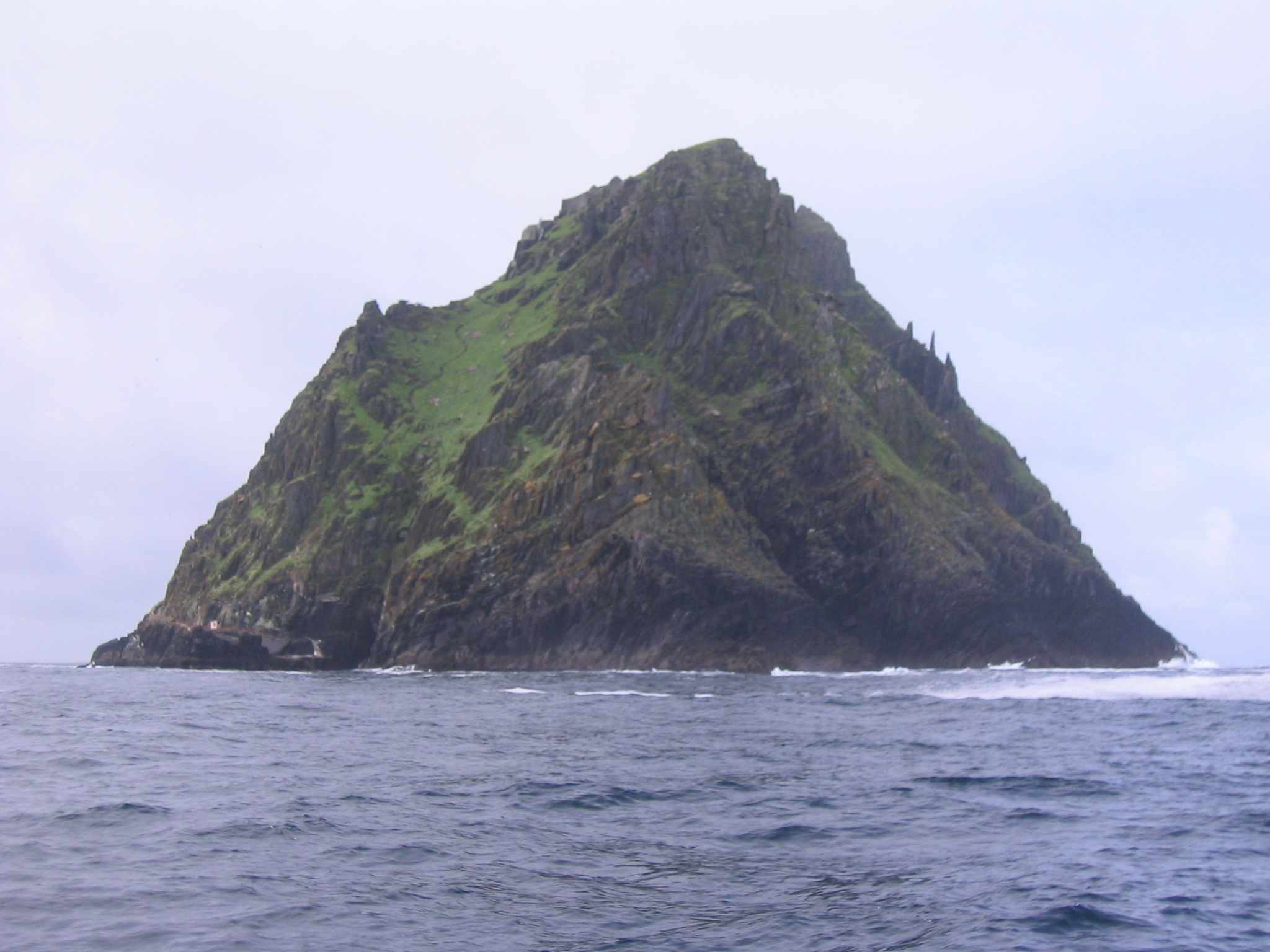
The monastery of Skellig Michael (Ireland)

Year 588 (DLXXXVIII) was a leap year starting on Thursday of the Julian calendar. The denomination 588 for this year has been used since the early medieval period, when the Anno Domini calendar era became the prevalent method in Europe for naming years.

== Events ==
=== By place ===
==== Byzantine Empire ====
- Byzantine-Sassanid War: Unpaid Byzantine troops mutiny against Priscus (magister militum per Orientem). King Hormizd IV begins a Persian offensive, but is defeated at Martyropolis (modern Turkey).
- Summer – Guaram I of Iberia, Georgian prince in exile, is sent by Emperor Maurice to the city of Mtskheta (Georgia). He restores the monarchy and is bestowed with the Byzantine court title of curopalates.

==== Europe ====
- The Franks and Burgundians under King Guntram and his nephew Childebert II invade Northern Italy, but suffer a disastrous defeat against the Lombards.
- The Lombard Kingdom (Italy) is converted to Roman Catholicism under the rule of King Authari (approximate date).

==== Britain ====
- Æthelric succeeds his father Ælla as king of Deira in Northern England.

==== Persia ====
- First Perso-Turkic War: A Persian army (12,000 men) under Bahrām Chobin, supported by Cataphracts (heavy cavalry), ambush the invading Turks, and win a great victory at the Battle of the Hyrcanian Rock.

==== Asia ====
- Emperor Wéndi of the Sui dynasty prepares a campaign against the Chen dynasty. He amasses 518,000 troops along the northern bank of the Yangtze River, stretching from Sichuan to the Pacific Ocean.

=== By topic ===
==== Religion ====
- The Skellig Michael monastery is founded on a steep rocky island off the coast of Ireland (approximate date).
- The Guanghua Temple in Putian (China) is built during the Chen dynasty, under Emperor Chen Wu Di.

== Births ==
- Eligius, bishop and saint (approximate date)
- Suintila, king of the Visigoths (approximate date)
- Yu Zhining, chancellor of the Tang dynasty (d. 665)

== Deaths ==
- Áed mac Bricc, Irish bishop and saint
- Ælla, king of Deira (approximate date)
- Agericus, bishop of Verdun
- Fridianus, Irish prince and saint
- Li Ezi, empress of Northern Zhou (b. 536)
- Monulph, bishop of Maastricht
