= Patriarch John IV of Alexandria =

6th-century Greek patriarch of Alexandria

John IV served as Greek Patriarch of Alexandria between 569 and 579.

Preceded by Apollinarius	Greek Patriarch of Alexandria; 569–579	Succeeded by Eulogius I
