= Pope Agapetus I =

Head of the Catholic Church from 535 to 536

Pope Saint Agapetus I
- Bishop of Rome
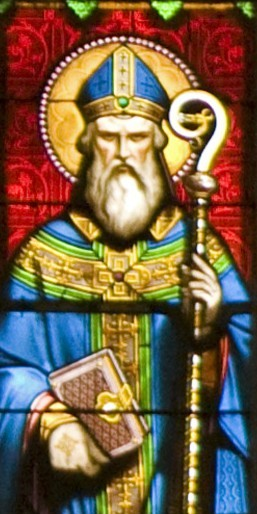
- Stained glass depiction of Pope Agapetus I with anachronistic papal tiara (Saint-Maixent-l'École, France
- Church: Catholic Church
- Papacy began: 13 May 535
- Papacy ended: 22 April 536
- Predecessor: John II
- Successor: Silverius

Personal details
- Born: c. 489–490 Rome, Ostrogothic Kingdom
- Died: 22 April 536 (aged 46) Constantinople, Eastern Roman Empire

Sainthood
- Feast day: 22 April or 20 September (West); 17 April (East)
- Venerated in: Catholic Church; Eastern Orthodox Church

Pope Agapetus I (489/490 – 22 April 536) was the bishop of Rome from 13 May 535 to his death on 22 April 536. His father, Gordianus, was a priest in Rome and he may have been related to two popes, Felix III and Gregory I.

In 536, Agapetus traveled to Constantinople at the behest of King Theodahad of the Ostrogoths and unsuccessfully tried to persuade Emperor Justinian I to call off a Byzantine invasion of the Ostrogoth kingdom. While in Constantinople, Agapetus also deposed the patriarch Anthimus I and personally consecrated his successor who is Menas of Constantinople. Four of Agapetus’ letters from this period have survived: two addressed to Justinian, one to the bishops of Africa, and one to the Bishop of Carthage.

Agapetus was canonized in both the Catholic and Orthodox traditions; his feast day is April 22.

== Family ==
Agapetus was born in Rome, although his exact date of birth is unknown. He was the son of Gordianus, a Roman priest who had been slain during the riots in the days of Pope Symmachus (term 498–514). The name of his father might point to a familial relation with popes: Felix III (483–492) and Gregory I (590–604).

== Pontificate ==
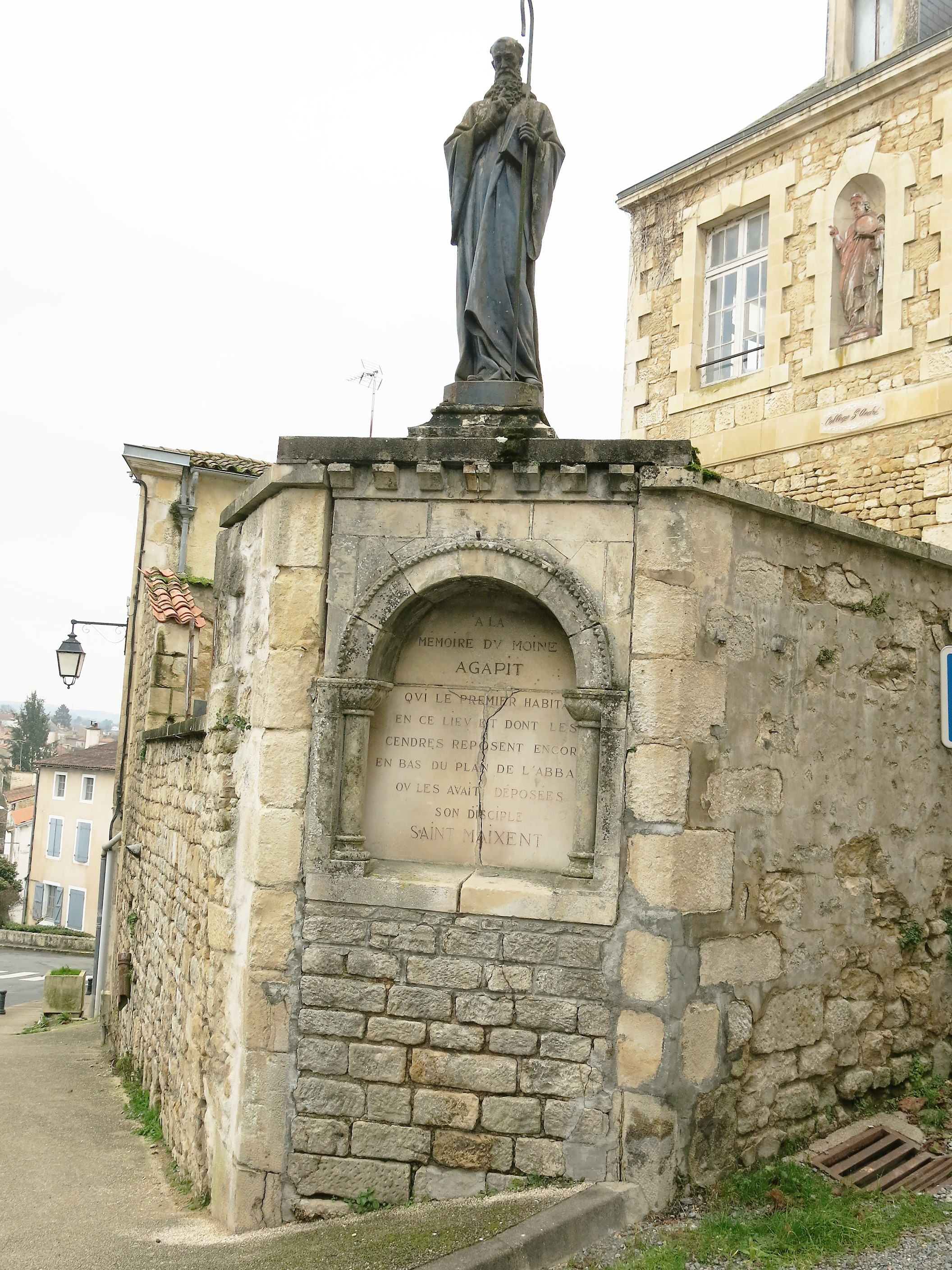
Statue of Agapetus I in Saint-Maixent-l'École

Jeffrey Richards describes him as "the last survivor of the Symmachan old guard", having been ordained as a deacon perhaps as early as 502, during the Laurentian schism. He was elevated from archdeacon to pope in 535. His first official act was to burn, in the presence of the assembled clergy, the anathema which Boniface II had pronounced against the latter's deceased rival Dioscurus on a false charge of simony and had ordered to be preserved in the Roman archives.

Agapetus assisted Cassiodorus in the founding of his monastery at Vivarium. He confirmed the decrees of the Council of Carthage, after the retaking of North Africa from the Vandals, according to which converts from Arianism were declared ineligible to Holy Orders and those already ordained were merely admitted to lay communion. He accepted an appeal from Contumeliosus, Bishop of Riez, whom the Council of Marseilles had condemned for immorality, and he ordered Caesarius of Arles to grant the accused a new trial before papal delegates.

Meanwhile, the Byzantine general Belisarius was preparing for an invasion of Italy. King Theodahad of the Ostrogoths begged Agapetus to proceed on an embassy to Constantinople and use his personal influence to appease Emperor Justinian I following the death of Amalasuntha. To defray the costs of the embassy, Agapetus pledged the sacred vessels of the Church of Rome. He set out in mid-winter with five bishops and a large retinue. In February 536, he appeared in the capital of the East. Justinian declined to call a halt to the planned invasion as preparations were far too advanced. Agapetus immediately turned his attention from the political matter Theodahad had sent him to address to a religious one.

The occupant of the Byzantine patriarchal see was Anthimus I, who had left his episcopal see of Trebizond. Against the protests of the orthodox, the Empress Theodora finally seated Anthimus in the patriarchal chair. When Agapetus arrived members of the clergy entered charges against Anthimus as an intruder and a heretic. Agapetus ordered him to make a written profession of faith and to return to his forsaken see; upon Anthimus' refusal, Agapetus deposed him. The Emperor threatened Agapetus with banishment. Agapetus is said to have replied, "With eager longing have I come to gaze upon the Most Christian Emperor Justinian. In his place I find a Diocletian, whose threats, however, terrify me not." Agapetus, for the first time in the history of the Church, personally consecrated Anthimus' legally elected successor, Menas. Justinian delivered to the Pope a written confession of faith, which the latter accepted with the proviso that "although he could not admit in a layman the right of teaching religion, yet he observed with pleasure that the zeal of the Emperor was in perfect accord with the decisions of the Fathers". Four of Agapetus' letters have survived. Two are addressed to Justinian in reply to a letter from the emperor, in the latter of which Agapetus refuses to acknowledge the Orders of the Arians. A third is addressed to the bishops of Africa, on the same subject. The fourth is a response to Reparatus, Bishop of Carthage, who had sent him congratulations upon his elevation to the Pontificate.

Shortly afterwards, Agapetus fell ill and died on 22 April 536, after a reign of just ten months. His remains were brought in a lead coffin to Rome and deposited in St. Peter's Basilica. On the Clivus Scauri the archeological remains known as the 'apsidal Hall of the Library of Pope Agapitus I' is located near the ancient Church of St. Andrew on the Caelian Hill.

== Veneration ==
Agapetus I has been canonised by both the Catholic and Orthodox traditions. The Roman Martyrology commemorates him on 22 April, the day of his death, as do the Eastern churches, but some Catholic sources list his feast day as 20 September, the date of his deposition.

== See also ==
- List of Catholic saints
- List of popes

== Bibliography ==
- Dudden, Frederick H. (1905), Gregory the Great, London: Longmans, Green, and Co
- Louise Ropes Loomis, The Book of Popes (Liber Pontificalis). Merchantville, New Jersey: Evolution Publishing. ISBN 1-889758-86-8 (Reprint of the 1916 edition. English translation with scholarly footnotes, and illustrations).
- Martindale, John R.; Jones, A.H.M.; Morris, John (1992), The Prosopography of the Later Roman Empire, Volume III: AD 527–641, Cambridge University Press, ISBN 978-0-521-20160-5
- Friedrich Wilhelm Bautz (1975). "AGAPET I.". In Bautz, Friedrich Wilhelm (ed.). Biographisch-Bibliographisches Kirchenlexikon (BBKL) (in German). Vol. 1. Hamm: Bautz. col. 52. ISBN 3-88309-013-1.

Catholic Church titles
| Preceded by John II | Pope; 535–536 | Succeeded by Silverius |
