= Menas of Constantinople =

Patriarch of Constantinople from 536 to 552

Saint Menas of Constantinople
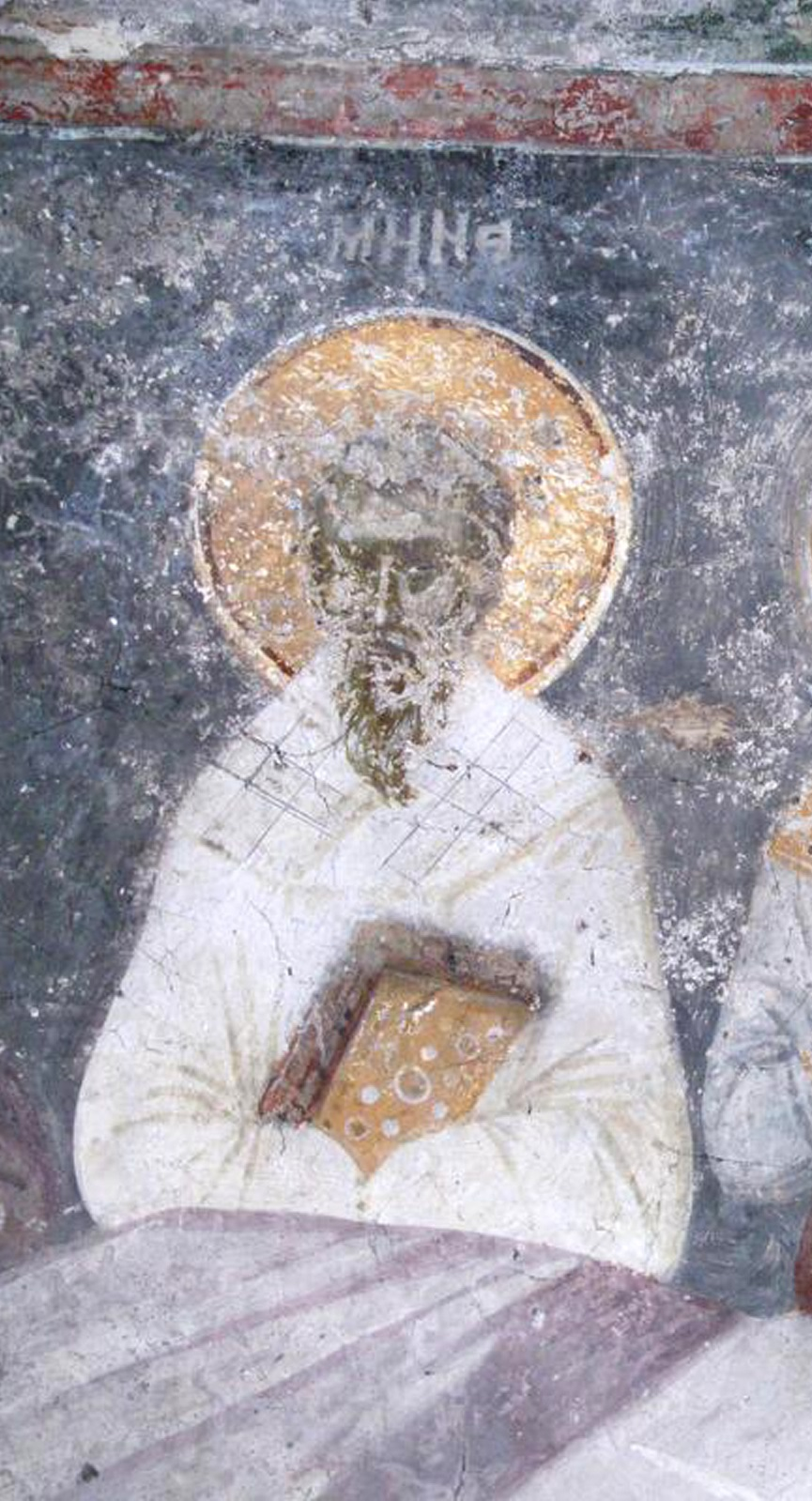
- Saint Menas of Constantinople

Patriarch of Constantinople
- Born: Alexandria
- Died: 25 August 552
- Venerated in: Eastern Orthodox Church; Catholic Church
- Feast: 25 August
- Controversy: Three-Chapter Controversy

Saint Menas of Constantinople
- Patriarch of Constantinople
- Installed: 13 March 536
- Term ended: 25 August 552
- Predecessor: Anthimus I of Constantinople
- Successor: Eutychius of Constantinople

Personal details
- Denomination: Chalcedonian Christianity

Menas of Constantinople (also Minas; Ancient Greek: Μηνᾶς; died 25 August 552) was the 55th Ecumenical Patriarch of Constantinople from 13 March 536 until his death on 25 August 552.

Menas was born in Alexandria, and enters the records in high ecclesiastical office as presbyter and director of the Hospital of Sampson in Constantinople, where tradition has him linked to saint Sampson the Hospitable directly, and in the healing of Byzantine emperor Justinian I from the bubonic plague in 542.

He was appointed Patriarch of Constantinople by the Byzantine emperor Justinian I on 13 March 536. Pope Agapetus I consecrated him to succeed Anthimus I of Constantinople, who was condemned by Agapetus as a monophysite. This was the first time that a Pope consecrated a Patriarch of Constantinople.

At some date, very soon after his election, he received the order (keleusis) from the Emperor, whose text is not preserved, but which instructed him to call a synodos endemousa to examine the case of Anthimus, which would be heard at a series of five sessions, beginning on 2 May and ending 4 June 536. The Synod condemned Anthimus, as noted in Novellae Constitutiones XLII from Justinian, addressed directly to Menas. Within this same effort from Justinian to seal the growing rift between the Patriarch in Constantinople and that of Jerusalem, Menas later took a position against Origen, a crisis merging into the Three-Chapter Controversy, an attempt to condemn the writings of certain non-Chalcedonian figures. Menas' patriarchate represents the greatest extent of papal influence in Constantinople.

Almost immediately after the events of 536, which may be viewed as a Chalcedonian victory over monophysites, the ordination of an independent network of alleged monophysite / self-professed miaphysite bishops claiming apostolic authority would begin, leading eventually to the formation of a separate non-Chalcedonian church, the still-existing Syrian Orthodox Church that would be in communion with other excommunicated sees of the same theological persuasion. Justinian and Menas' efforts for doctrinal church unity would meet with failure.

It was during his patriarchate that emperor Justinian's church of Hagia Sophia, then the largest building in the world and the seat of the Patriarchs, was consecrated. Also, in 551 the Emperor compelled Menas to call what would be the Second Council of Constantinople, to reconcile the Western and Eastern Churches around the Three-Chapter Controversy, to be chaired ultimately by his successor Patriarch Eutychius of Constantinople in 553.

He died peacefully in 552. Menas is venerated a Saint in the Eastern Orthodox Church and Catholic Church today. His feast day in both the Eastern Orthodox and Catholic Church traditions are observed on 25 August.

== Notes and references ==
Titles of Chalcedonian Christianity
Preceded by Anthimus I	Patriarch of Constantinople; 536 – 552	Succeeded by Eutychius
