= Anthimus I of Constantinople =

Patriarch of Constantinople from 535 to 536

His Holiness Saint Anthimus I of Constantinople The Righteous Father
- Church: Oriental Orthodox Church
- See: See of Constantinople
- Installed: June 535
- Term ended: March 536
- Predecessor: Epiphanius of Constantinople
- Successor: Menas of Constantinople

Personal details
- Died: after 548
- Denomination: Oriental Orthodox

Sainthood
- Feast day: 3 October
- Venerated in: Oriental Orthodox:Syriac Orthodox Church
- Title as Saint: Saint Anthimus I of Constantinople

Anthimus I of Constantinople (Greek: Ἄνθιμος; died after 548) was a Miaphysite and patriarch of Constantinople from 535 to 536. He was the bishop or archbishop of Trebizond before accession to the Constantinople see. He was deposed by Pope Agapetus I for adhering to miaphysitism (the belief that Jesus had only one composite divine and human nature) before 13 March 536, and later hidden by Theodora in her quarters for 12 years, until her death in 548. Following Theodora's death, he was reconciled with emperor Justinian and was allowed to reside in Constantinople until his death at an unknown date.

== Notes and references ==
Titles of Chalcedonian Christianity
Preceded by Epiphanius	Patriarch of Constantinople; 535 – 536	Succeeded by Menas
