= John of Cappadocia =

Patriarch of Constantinople from 518 to 520

- Patriarch of Constantinople
- Installed: 17 April 518
- Term ended: February 520
- Predecessor: Timothy I of Constantinople
- Successor: Epiphanius of Constantinople

Personal details
- Died: 19 January 520
- Denomination: Chalcedonian Christianity

John of Cappadocia, surnamed Cappadox or the Cappadocian (Greek: Ἰωάννης ὁ Καππαδόκης; died February 520), was patriarch of Constantinople in 518–520, during the reign of Byzantine emperor Anastasius I Dicorus after an enforced condemnation of the Council of Chalcedon. His short patriarchate is memorable for the celebrated Acclamations of Constantinople, and the reunion of East and West after a schism of 34 years. At the death of Timothy I of Constantinople, John of Cappadocia, whom he had designated his successor, was presbyter and chancellor of the Church of Constantinople.

== Biography ==
On 9 July 518, the long reign of Anastasius I Dicorus came to a close, the orthodox Justin I succeeding. On 15 July, the new emperor entered the cathedral, and the patriarch, accompanied by twelve prelates, was making his way through the throngs that crowded every corner. As he came near the raised dais where the pulpit stood shouts arose, "Long live the patriarch! Long live the emperor! Why do we remain excommunicated? Why have we not communicated these many years? You are Catholic, what do you fear; worthy servant of the Trinity? Cast out Severus the Manichee! O Justin, our emperor, you win! This instant proclaim the synod of Chalcedon, because Justin reigns". These and other cries continued. The procession passed into the inclosure, but the excited congregation went on shouting outside the gates of the choir in similar strains: "You shall not come out unless you anathematise Severus", referring to the heretical patriarch of Antioch. The patriarch John, having meanwhile gained time for thought and consultation, came out and mounted the pulpit, saying, "There is no need of disturbance or tumult; nothing has been done against the faith; we recognise for orthodox all the councils which have confirmed the decrees of Nicaea, and principally these three - First Council of Constantinople, First Council of Ephesus, and the great Council of Chalcedon".

The people were determined to have a more formal decision, and continued shouting for several hours, mingling with their former cries such as these: "Fix a day for a festival in honour of Chalcedon!" "Commemorate the holy synod this very morrow!". The people being thus firm, the deacon Samuel was instructed to announce the desired festival. Still the people continued to shout with all their might, "Severus is now to be anathematised; anathematise him this instant, or there's nothing done!". The patriarch, seeing that something must be settled, took counsel with the twelve attendant prelates, who agreed to the curse on Severus. This extemporaneous and intimidated council then carried a decree by acclamation: "It is plain to all that Severus in separating himself from this church condemned himself. Following, therefore, the canons and the Fathers, we hold him alien and condemned by reason of his blasphemies, and we anathematise him". The domes of St. Sophia rang with shouts of triumph and the crowd dispersed. It was a day long remembered in Constantinople.

The next day the promised commemoration of Chalcedon took place. Again as the patriarch made his processional entrance and approached the pulpit clamours arose: "Restore the relics of Macedonius II of Constantinople to the church! Restore those exiled for the faith! Let the bones of the Nestorians be dug up! Let the bones of the Eutychians be dug up! Cast out the Manichees! Place the four councils in the diptychs! Place Pope Leo I, bishop of Rome, in the diptychs! Bring the diptychs to the pulpit!". This kind of cry continuing, the patriarch replied, "Yesterday we did what was enough to satisfy my dear people, and we shall do the same to-day. We must take the faith as our inviolable foundation; it will aid us to reunite the churches. Let us then glorify with one mouth the holy and consubstantial Trinity". But the people went on crying madly, "This instant, let none go out! I abjure you, shut the doors! You no longer fear Amantius the Manichee! Justin reigns, why fear Amantius?". So they continued. The patriarch tried in vain to bring them to reason. It was the outburst of enthusiasm and excitement long pent up under heterodox repression. It bore all before it. The patriarch was at last obliged to have inserted in the diptychs the four councils of First Council of Nicaea, Constantinople, Ephesus, and Chalcedon, and the names of Euphemius of Constantinople and Macedonius II, patriarchs of Constantinople, and Leo I, bishop of Rome. Then the multitude chanted for more than an hour, "Blessed be the Lord God of Israel, for He hath visited and redeemed His people!". The choir assembled on the raised platform, and, turning eastwards, sang the Trisagion, the whole people listening in silence. When the moment arrived for the recitation of the names of the defunct bishops from the diptychs, the multitude closed in silence about the holy table; and when the deacon had read the new insertions, a mighty shout arose, "Glory be to Thee, O Lord!".

To authenticate what had been done, John assembled on 20 July a council of 40 bishops, who happened to be at the capital. The four general councils and the name of Pope Leo I were inscribed in the diptychs. Severus of Antioch was anathematised after an examination of his works in which a distinct condemnation of Chalcedon was discovered. John wrote to John III (bishop of Jerusalem) and to Epiphanius of Tyre, telling them the good news of the acclamations and the synod. His letters were accompanied by orders from Justin to restore all who had been banished by Anastasius and to inscribe the Council of Chalcedon in the diptychs. At Jerusalem and at Tyre there was great joy. Many other churches declared for Chalcedon, and during the reign of Justin, 2500 bishops gave their adhesion and approval. Now came the reconciliation with Rome. The emperor Justin wrote to the pope a fortnight after the scene of the acclamations, begging him to further the desires of the patriarch John for the reunion of the churches. John wrote saying that he received the four general councils and that the names of Leo and of Hormisdas himself had been put in the diptychs. A deputation was sent to Constantinople with instructions that Acacius was to be anathematised by name, but that Euphemius and Macedonius II might be passed over in silence.

The deputies arrived at Constantinople on 25 March 519. Justin received the pope's letters with great respect, and told the ambassadors to come to an explanation with the patriarch, who at first wished to express his adherence in the form of a letter, but agreed to write a little preface and place after it the words of Hormisdas, which he copied out in his own handwriting. Two copies were sent by the legates to Rome, one in Greek, the other in Latin. Emperor, senate, and all present were overjoyed at this ratification of peace.

The sting of the transaction still remained; they had now to efface from the diptychs the names of five patriarchs - patriarch Acacius of Constantinople, patriarch Fravitta of Constantinople, patriarch Euphemius of Constantinople, patriarch Macedonius II of Constantinople, and patriarch Timothy I of Constantinople - and two emperors - Zeno and Anastasius I. All the bishops at Constantinople gave their consent in writing; so did all the abbots, after some discussion. On Easter Day the pacification was promulgated. The court and people, equally enthusiastic, surged into Saint Sophia. The vaults resounded with acclamations in praise of God, the emperor, Saint Peter, and the Pope of Rome [Bishop of Rome]. Opponents, who had prophesied sedition and tumult, were signally disappointed. Never within memory had so vast a number communicated. The emperor sent an account of the proceedings throughout the provinces and the ambassadors forwarded their report to Rome, saying that there only remained the negotiations with the Patriarch of Antioch. John wrote to Pope Hormisdas to congratulate him on the great work, and to offer him the credit of its success. Soon after, on 19 January 520, John died.

== Notes and references ==
=== Attribution ===
- Sinclair cites:
  - Avitus of Vienne, Ep. vii, Patrologia Latina, lix, 227;
  - Baronius, ad. ann. 518, x-lxxvii, 520, vii;
  - Fleury, ii, 573;
  - Acta Sanctorum, 18 August, iii, 655;
  - Pope Hormisdas, Epp., Patrologia Latina, lxiii, p. 426;
  - Nikephoros Kallistos Xanthopoulos, iiii, 456, Patrologia Graeca, cxlvii;
  - Photios I of Constantinople, iii, § 287 a, Patrologia Graeca, ciii;
  - Theophanes the Confessor, Chronogr. § 140, Patrologia Graeca, cviii.

Titles of Chalcedonian Christianity
Preceded by Timothy I	Patriarch of Constantinople; 518 – 520	Succeeded by Epiphanius
