= Flavia gens =

Roman families

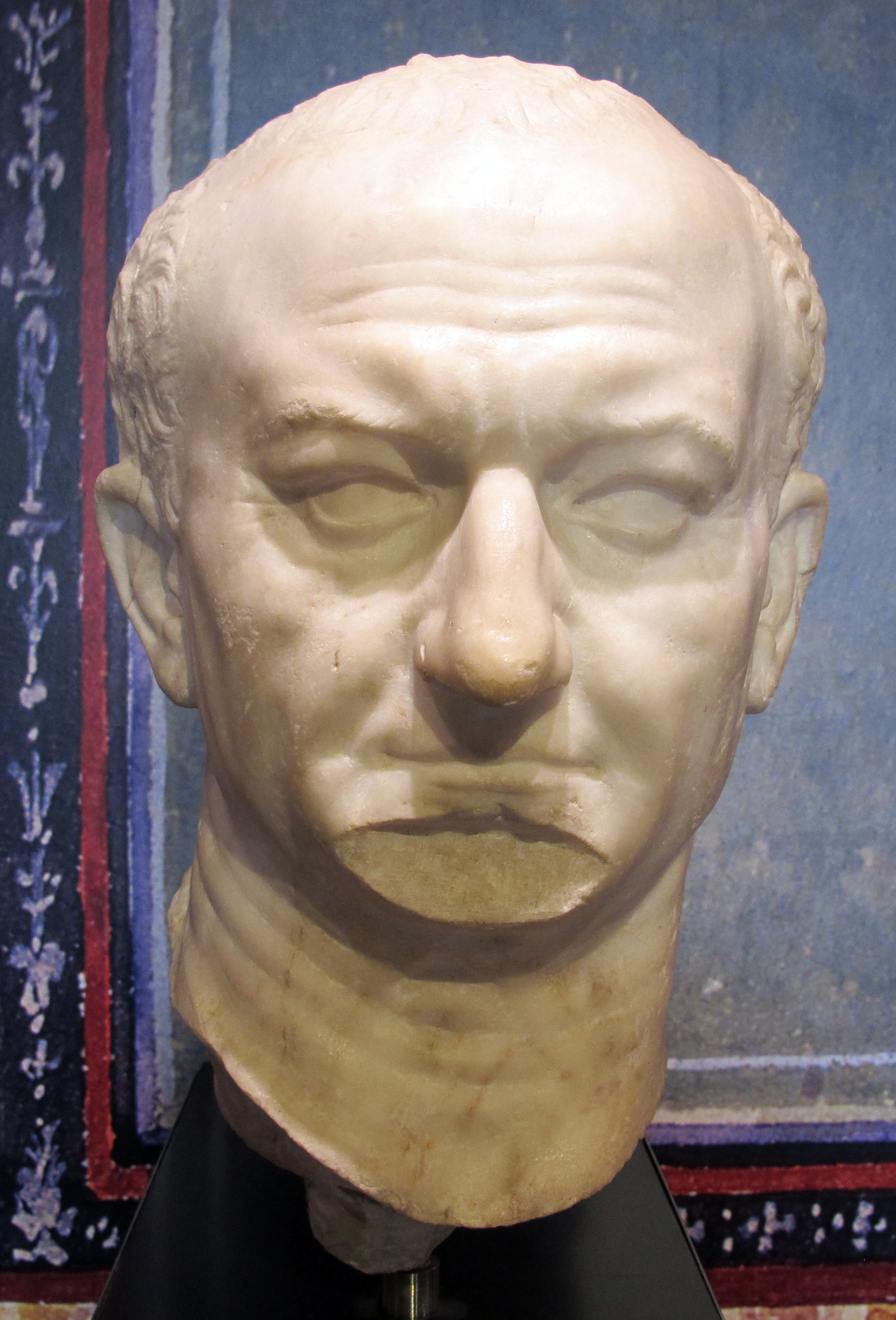
The emperor Vespasian, from the Museo Nazionale Romano.

The gens Flavia was a plebeian family of ancient Rome. Its members are first mentioned during the last three centuries of the Republic. The first of the Flavii to achieve prominence was Marcus Flavius, tribune of the plebs in 327 and 323 BC; however, no Flavius attained the consulship until Gaius Flavius Fimbria in 104 BC. The gens became illustrious during the first century AD, when the family of the Flavii Sabini claimed the imperial dignity.

Under the Empire, the number of persons bearing this nomen becomes very large, perhaps due to the great number of freedmen under the Flavian dynasty of emperors. It was a common practice for freedmen to assume the nomina of their patrons, and so countless persons who obtained the Roman franchise under the Flavian emperors adopted the name Flavius, which was then handed down to their descendants. Freedmen under the Constantinian dynasty, whose members were also called Flavius, also adopted it, as did individuals who entered government service during their rule, often replacing their original nomina with the dynastic Flavius.

The vast majority of persons named Flavius during the later Empire could not have been descended from the Flavia gens; and indeed, the distinction between nomina and cognomina was all but lost, so that in many cases one cannot even determine with certainty whether it is a nomen or a cognomen. However, because it is impossible to determine which of these persons used Flavius as a gentile name, they have been listed below.

== Origin ==
The Flavii of the Republic claimed Sabine ancestry, and may have been related to the Flavii who lived at Reate during the first century AD, from whom the emperor Vespasian descended; but the gentilicium is also found in other parts of Italy, such as Etruria and Lucania. The nomen Flavius is of Latin origin, and is derived from the surname Flavus, used by a number of gentes, and meaning "golden" or "golden-brown". It probably referred to the blond hair possessed by an early member of the family.

== Later use ==
During the later period of the Empire, the name Flavius frequently descended from one emperor to another, beginning with Constantius Chlorus, the father of Constantine the Great. The name became so ubiquitous that it was sometimes treated as a praenomen, to the extent of being regularly abbreviated Fl., and it is even described as a praenomen in some sources, although it was never truly used as a personal name, and from the time of Honorius it appears chiefly in letters. It once again became a regular part of the nomenclature of the eastern emperors from Justinian I through the reign of Constantine IV, and appearing as late as the reign of Leo VI in the tenth century. After the name fell into disuse among the Byzantine emperors, it was used as a title of legitimacy among the barbarian rulers of former Roman provinces, such as Visigothic Spain and the kings of the Ostrogothic Kingdom of Italy and the Kingdom of the Lombards.

From the fourth century AD onwards, the name is widespread among non-emperors as a mark of dignity. It is widespread in epigraphy from Germania. In Egypt, where the evidence is best, it was part of the full name of all Imperial officials, all provincial officials, the highest civic officials, and most soldiers. This usage appears shortly after Constantine gained control of the province in 324 AD. Between 287 and 326 AD, Egyptians had used Valerius (the nomen of Constantine's predecessors) in a similar way. People not entitled to "Flavius" bore the nomen Aurelius or no nomen. Initially, people sometimes used the name Flavius alongside another nomen that they were entitled to (e.g. Julius, Aelius), but these other nomina died out over the fifth century. In the fourth century, the name was not inherited by children or wives of the "Flavius", but from the fifth century higher-ranking holders sometimes passed the name to their descendants. After the Arab conquest of Egypt in 646, the use of "Flavius" was less consistent and after some time it died out.

In modern use, Flavius is a personal name, and widely used in romance languages, including Italian and Spanish Flavio (fem. Flavia), French Flavien (fem. Flavie), Portuguese Flávio (fem. Flávia), and Romanian Flavius or Flaviu (fem. Flavia).

== Praenomina ==
The early Flavii used the praenomina Marcus, Quintus, Gaius, and Lucius. Of these, only Gaius and Lucius are known from the family of the Fimbriae. The name Gnaeus occurs once, but as the son of a freedman of the family, and thus does not seem to be representative of the gens. The Flavii Sabini appear to have restricted themselves to the praenomen Titus alone, and distinguished their sons by the use of different surnames, usually by giving the younger sons surnames derived from their maternal ancestors.

== Branches and cognomina ==
The Flavii of the Republic used the cognomina Fimbria, Gallus, Lucanus, and Pusio. Only the Fimbriae, whose surname refers to a fringe or border, represented a distinct family. Gallus and Lucanus belong to a class of surnames derived from places of origin or association, referring to Gaul and Lucania, respectively, although Gallus, a very common surname, could also refer to a cockerel. Pusio was originally a nickname indicating a little boy, and would have been bestowed on someone small or youthful.

The Flavii Sabini, whose surname indicates Sabine ancestry, rose to prominence under the Empire. They were descended from Titus Flavius Petro, a soldier from Reate who fought under Gnaeus Pompeius Magnus. Within two generations they had attained such respectability that two of his grandsons held the consulship in consecutive years, AD 51 and 52; the younger of these marched to Rome at the head of an army in the year of the four emperors, AD 69, and claimed the imperial dignity as the emperor Vespasian. However, within less than thirty years, the family was largely destroyed through the workings of Vespasian's son, the emperor Domitian. The Flavii Titiani may be descended from the Flavii Sabini through the consul Titus Flavius Clemens, a nephew of Vespasian; the first of this branch, Titus Flavius Titianus, who was governor of Egypt from AD 126 to 133, may have been his son.

A family of the Flavii bearing the surname Valens lived at Hatria, and from there migrated to Rome in imperial times, where two of them served as prefects of different cohorts.

== Members ==
This list includes abbreviated praenomina. For an explanation of this practice, see filiation.

- Marcus Flavius, tribune of the plebs in BC 327 and 323.
- Gnaeus Flavius, the son of a freedman, he was secretary to Appius Claudius Caecus, and served as aedile in 304 BC.
- Flavius, or Flavius Lucanus, a Lucanian, who went over to Mago during the Second Punic War, and delivered the proconsul Tiberius Sempronius Gracchus, in return for the promise that the Lucanians should be free and retain their own constitution.
- Quintus Flavius, an augur who, according to Valerius Maximus, was accused by the aedile Gaius Valerius (perhaps the same who was curule aedile in BC 199). When fourteen tribes had already voted against Flavius, who again asserted his innocence, Valerius declared that he did not care whether the man was guilty or innocent, provided he secured his punishment; and the people, indignant at such conduct, acquitted Flavius.
- Quintus Flavius, of Tarquinii, murdered the slave Panurgus, who belonged to Gaius Fannius Chaerea, and who was to be trained as an actor by Quintus Roscius, the celebrated comedian.
- Lucius Flavius, an eques, who gave evidence against Verres in BC 70. He probably lived in Sicily, and was engaged in mercantile pursuits. He appears to be the same Lucius Flavius who is mentioned as procurator (that is, the agent or steward) of Gaius Matrinius in Sicily.
- Gaius Flavius, brother of Lucius, and likewise an eques, whom Cicero recommended in BC 46 to Manius Acilius, praetor of Sicily, as an intimate friend of Cicero's late son-in-law, Gaius Calpurnius Piso Frugi.
- Gaius Flavius Pusio, is mentioned by Cicero as one of the equites who opposed the tribune Marcus Drusus.
- Lucius Flavius, praetor in BC 58, and a supporter of Pompeius. He was plebeian tribune in 60 BC and failed in passing a land reform programme for Pompey's veterans. He was also a friend of both Cicero and Caesar, and may have been the same Flavius whom Caesar entrusted with one legion and the province of Sicily in BC 49.
- Gaius Flavius, an eques of Asta, a Roman colony in Spain. He and other equites, who had belonged to the party of Pompeius, went over to Caesar in BC 45. It is uncertain whether he is the same Gaius Flavius who is mentioned among the enemies of Octavian, and who was put to death in BC 40, after the taking of Perusia.
- Gaius Flavius, a friend of Brutus, whom he accompanied to Philippi in the capacity of praefectus fabrum. Flavius fell in the Battle of Philippi, and Brutus lamented over his death.
- Flavius Gallus, a military tribune serving under Marcus Antonius in his unfortunate campaign against the Parthians in BC 36. During Antonius' retreat, Gallus made an inconsiderate attack upon the enemy, for which he paid with his life.

=== Flavii Fimbriae ===
- Gaius Flavius Fimbria, the father of Gaius Flavius Fimbria, the consul of 104 BC.
- Gaius Flavius C. f. Fimbria, consul in 104 BC; acquitted of extortion, despite significant evidence. With other consulars, took up arms against the revolt of Saturninus in 100. A clever jurist and powerful orator, his reputation had faded by Cicero's time, when his speeches were scarcely to be found.
- Gaius Flavius C. f. C. n. Fimbria, a violent partisan of Gaius Marius, at whose funeral he tried to kill Quintus Mucius Scaevola, the Pontifex Maximus. Sent to Asia in an expedition against Mithridates and Sulla, Fimbria led a mutiny against the consul Valerius Flaccus, whom he murdered, taking command of the army. With much savagery, he subdued much of Asia, but when his men went over to Sulla, he took his own life.
- Flavius C. f. C. n. Fimbria, brother of Gaius, was likewise in the service of the Marian party in the war against Sulla, 82 BC, and was legate to Gaius Norbanus. He and other officers of the party of Carbo were invited to a banquet by Publius Albinovanus, and then treacherously murdered.
- Lucius Flavius Fimbria, consul suffectus in AD 71, during the months of July and August.

=== Flavii Sabini ===
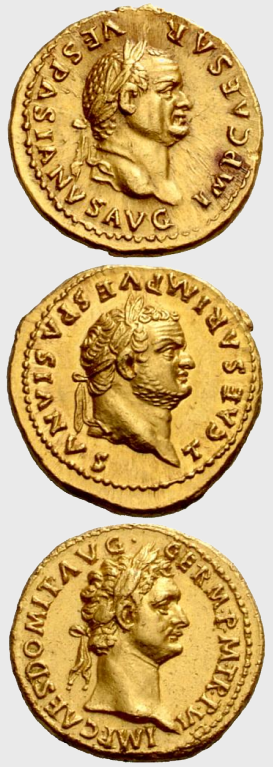
Aurei of the Flavian dynasty

- Titus Flavius Petro, grandfather of the emperor Vespasian, was a native of the municipium of Reate, and served as a centurion in the army of Gnaeus Pompeius Magnus at the Battle of Pharsalus, 48 BC.
- Titus Flavius T. f. Sabinus, father of Vespasian, was one of the farmers of the tax of the quadragesima in Asia, which he collected with so much fairness that many cities erected statues to his honour with the inscription, καλως τελωνησαντι. He afterwards carried on business as a money-lender among the Helvetii, and died in their country.
- Titus Flavius T. f. T. n. Sabinus, the elder brother of Vespasian, was consul suffectus in AD 52, and praefectus urbi for most of Nero's reign. The emperor Vitellius offered to surrender the empire into his hands until the arrival of Vespasian, but the soldiers of each refused this arrangement, and Sabinus was murdered by Vitellius' troops, despite the emperor's attempts to save him.
- Titus Flavius T. f. T. n. Vespasianus, the emperor Vespasian, was consul suffectus in AD 51, and proconsul in Africa and Judaea under Nero. He became emperor in AD 69, on the death of Vitellius, and reigned until his death in 79.
- Flavia Domitilla, otherwise known as Domitilla the Elder, the wife of Vespasian.
- Titus Flavius (T. f. T. n.) Sabinus, consul suffectus in AD 69, was probably a nephew of the emperor Vespasian. He was one of the generals appointed by the emperor Otho to oppose the forces of Vitellius, but after Otho's death, he submitted to the conqueror, and caused his troops in the north of Italy to submit to the generals of Vitellius.
- Titus Flavius T. f. T. n. Sabinus, son of the consul of 52, and nephew of Vespasian, he was consul with his cousin, the emperor Domitian, in AD 82, but afterwards slain by the emperor on the pretext that the herald proclaiming his consulship had called him Imperator instead of consul.
- Titus Flavius T. f. T. n. Clemens, son of the consul of 52, and nephew of Vespasian, he was consul with his cousin, the emperor Domitian, in AD 95. Although the emperor had intended Clemens' sons to succeed him in the empire, and renamed them Vespasian and Domitian, he had his cousin put to death during his consulship, according to Cassius Dio on a charge of atheism, implying that he had become a Christian.
- Titus Flavius T. f. T. n. Vespasianus, the emperor Titus, reigned from AD 79 to 81.
- Titus Flavius T. f. T. n. Domitianus, the emperor Domitian, emperor from AD 81 to 96.
- Flavia Domitilla, otherwise known as Domitilla the Younger, the daughter of Vespasian.
- Julia Flavia, daughter of the emperor Titus; she married her cousin, Titus Flavius Sabinus, consul in AD 82. He was murdered by Julia's uncle, the emperor Domitian, who then took his niece for a mistress.
- Flavia Domitilla, daughter of Domitilla the Younger, and granddaughter of Vespasian; she married her cousin, Titus Flavius Clemens, consul in AD 95. He was murdered by Domitilla's uncle, the emperor Domitian, and Domitilla was exiled.

=== Flavii Titiani ===
- Titus Flavius Titianus, governor of Egypt from AD 126 to 133.
- Titus Flavius Titianus, governor of Egypt from AD 164 to 167.
- Titiana, mother of Flavia Titiana, the wife of Pertinax.
- Titus Flavius Claudius Sulpicianus, consul suffectus c. AD 170, and proconsul in Asia, 186. His daughter, Flavia Titiana, married the future emperor Pertinax, and Sulpicianus served as praefectus urbi under Pertinax and Didius Julianus. He was put to death by Septimius Severus in 197.
- Titus Flavius Titianus, consul suffectus circa AD 200; he was probably the same Titus Flavius Titianus who was procurator of Alexandria under Caracalla, and who was put to death by Theocritus, c. 216.
- Flavia Titiana, the wife of Pertinax, and Roman empress in AD 193.
- Titus Flavius Postumius Titianus, consul in AD 301.

=== Flavii Apri ===
- Marcus Flavius Aper, consul in AD 103.
- Marcus Flavius Aper, consul in AD 130.
- Marcus Flavius M. f. Aper, consul in AD 176.
- Titus Flavius Aper Commodianus, legate in Germania Inferior in AD 222 and 223, was consul in an unknown year.
- Lucius Flavius Aper, praeses of Pannonia Inferior in the second half of the third century. He may be identified with Aper, praetorian prefect and father-in-law of the emperor Numerian, whose death he allegedly and unsuccessfully tried to conceal, and was thereupon slain by Diocletian.

=== Others ===
- Flavius Scaevinus, a senator of dissolute life, took part in the conspiracy of Piso against Nero. It was through Milichus, the freedman of Scaevinus, that the conspiracy was discovered by Nero. Milichus was liberally rewarded by the emperor, and Scaevinus put to death.
- Subrius Flavus, called Flavius in some manuscripts, tribune of the praetorian guard, and an active agent in the conspiracy against Nero, after the discovery of which he was put to death.
- Lucius Flavius Silva Nonius Bassus, consul in AD 81. He had been governor of Judaea from 73 to 81, and led the Roman forces at the siege of Masada, which fell in 74.
- Titus Flavius Josephus, a historian of Jewish origin, who was captured by the future emperor Vespasian after the siege of Iotapata. He was spared execution, and eventually found favour with Vespasian, Titus, and Domitian, adopting the name Titus Flavius in honour of his patrons.
- Titus Flavius Hyrcanus, the third son of Josephus.
- Titus Flavius Justus, the fourth son of Josephus.
- Titus Flavius Simonides Agrippa, the fifth son of Josephus.
- Lucius Flavius Arrianus, called by the Athenians the young Xenophon, a historian of the second century. He was Greek, but received the Roman franchise and the right to hold high office from the emperor Hadrian in AD 124, whence he adopted the name Lucius Flavius. He held the consulship in AD 146.
- Titus Flavius Clemens, also known as Clement of Alexandria, one of the early Church fathers, lived from the middle of the second century to the second decade of the third century. He may have been born at Athens. His relationship to the other Flavii, or to Titus Flavius Clemens, the consul of AD 95, who may have been a convert to Christianity, is unknown; Clement's parents are thought to have been well-to-do pagans. Given the large number of persons who adopted the nomen Flavius during this period, his name could be coincidental.
- Flavius Caper, a Roman grammarian of uncertain date; he may have lived in the second century.
- Flavius Flavianus, equestrian governor of Mauretania Tingitana AD 153.
- Flavius Calvisius, apparently the same as Gaius Calvisius Statianus, the governor of Egypt under Marcus Aurelius, took part in the revolt of Avidius Cassius, but was treated by the emperor with great leniency, and was only banished to an island.
- Titus Flavius Piso, governor of Egypt circa AD 181.
- Titus Flavius Genialis, praetorian prefect with Tullius Crispinus in AD 193.
- Flavius Heracleo, the commander of the Roman soldiers in Mesopotamia in the reign of Alexander Severus, was slain by his own troops.
- Flavius Maternianus, Praefectus urbi under Caracalla, was either put to death or treated with great indignity by Macrinus, AD 217.
- Lucius Flavius Philostratus, author of the Life of Apollonius of Tyana, is called Flavius by Tzetzes in Βιος Σοφιστων (Lives of the Sophists), must have lived during the third century.
- Flavius Ingenianus, governor of Mauretania Tingitana in the later third century.
- Flavius Scribonianus, a Roman noble of consular and senatorial rank who was a steward in charge of running the Olympic Games. His name was inscribed on a discus found at Olympia, evidently dating from AD 241.
- Flavius Vopiscus of Syracuse, one of the six scriptores of the Historia Augusta, whose name is prefixed to the biographies of Aurelian, Tacitus, Florianus, Probus, the Four Tyrants (Firmus, Saturninus, Proculus, and Bonosus), Carus, Numerianus, and Carinus. Modern scholarship has called Vopiscus' authorship, and even his existence, into question.
- Flavia, otherwise known as Saint Flavia, venerated along with Placidus and several others, and said to have been martyred under the emperor Diocletian, or in other accounts by pirates.
- Quintus Flavius Maesius Egnatius Lollianus Mavortius, consul in AD 355.
- Flavius Eusebius, consul in AD 337. He was the father of Eusebius and Hypatius who served as consuls in AD 359, and probably also the empress Eusebia, wife of Constantius II.
- Flavius Eusebius, consul in AD 359, together with his brother, Hypatius. Falsely accused of treason in 371, he was soon recalled.
- Flavius Hypatius, consul in AD 359, together with his brother, Eusebius. He was praetorian prefect of Italy and Illyricum from 382 to 383.
- Eusebia, wife of the emperor Constantius II.
- Flavius Martinus, a vicarius, or deputy administrator, of Britannia during the middle fourth century.
- Flavius Mallius Theodorus, consul in AD 399, and a contemporary of Augustine of Hippo, who dedicated to him his work, De Vita Beata.
- Flavius Avianus, the author of a collection of forty-two Aesopic fables in Latin elegiac verse, dedicated to a certain Theodosius, who is addressed as a man of great learning and highly cultivated mind.
- Flavius Stilicho, a Roman general under the emperors Theodosius and Honorius; he dealt several crushing defeats to Alaric, king of the Visigoths. Edward Gibbon called him "the last of the Roman generals."
- Flavius Felix, consul in AD 428, and a leading figure under Valentinian III and Theodosius II. In 430, he and his wife were accused of plotting against Aëtius, who had him put to death.
- Flavius Aëtius, a Roman general under the emperor Valentinian III, who helped maintain imperial authority in Italy, Spain and Gaul. He defeated Chlodion, king of the Franks, and with the help of Theodoric, king of the Visigoths, defeated Attila the Hun at the Catalaunian Plains in AD 451. He was consul in 432, 437, and 446, but in 454 the suspicious emperor slew him with his own hand.
- Flavius Felix, an African who flourished towards the close of the fifth century, the author of five short pieces in the Latin Anthology.
- Flavius Belisarius, a Byzantine general under the emperor Justinian; he reconquered much of the western empire, and was consul sine collega in AD 535.
- Flavius Paulus, a 7th-century Roman general in Visigothic Spain

=== Constantinian dynasty ===
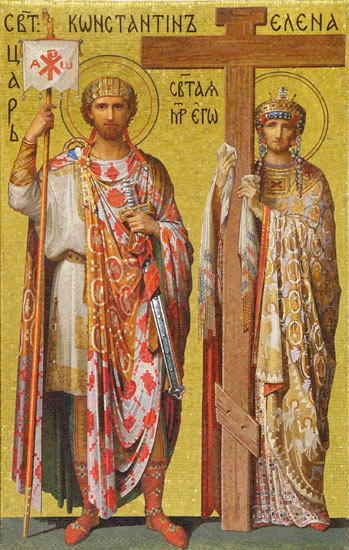
Constantine and Helena. Mosaic in Saint Isaac's Cathedral, Petersburg, Russia

- Flavius Valerius Constantius "Chlorus", emperor from AD 305 to 306, and the father of Constantine the Great.
- Flavia Julia Helena, the first wife of Constantius Chlorus, and mother of the emperor Constantine.
- Flavia Maximiana Theodora, probably the daughter of Afranius Hannibalianus, and stepdaughter of Maximian; she was the second wife of Constantius Chlorus.
- Flavius Valerius Constantinus, otherwise known as Constantine the Great, emperor from AD 306 to 337.
- (Flavius) Julius Constantius, eldest son of Constantius Chlorus and Theodora, and brother of Constantine. He was named consul in AD 335, but put to death following the emperor's death in 337. His sons, Constantius Gallus and Julian, were spared, and would eventually be named heirs by their cousin, Constantius II, who had married their sister.
- Flavius Dalmatius, son of Constantius Chlorus and Theodora, and brother of Constantine; styled the "censor" from AD 333, but was slain following the death of Constantine.
- Flavius Hannibalianus, son of Constantius Chlorus and Theodora, was granted the title Nobilissimus, but perished in the massacre of the Flavian dynasty following the death of his brother, Constantine.
- Flavia Julia Constantia, daughter of Constantius Chlorus and Theodora, and sister of Constantine, was given by him in marriage to his colleague, the emperor Licinius.
- Flavia Maxima Fausta, daughter of Maximian, and second wife of Constantine; she was put to death in AD 326, shortly after the execution of her stepson, Crispus. The reasons are unclear, but rumors circulated of an affair between the empress and her stepson, or of a false allegation against Crispus by his stepmother, leading to his death.
- Flavius Julius Crispus, son of Constantine, served his father in the war against Licinius, but was put to death in unclear circumstances in AD 326.
- Flavia Valeria Constantina, the elder daughter of Constantine and Fausta, she was given in marriage first to her cousin Hannibalianus, and following his death in the dynastic purge of AD 337, to her cousin Constantius Gallus. She died in 354.
- Flavia Julia Helena, the younger daughter of Constantine and Fausta, she was given in marriage to her cousin, Julian, the future emperor. The couple was childless, and Helena suffered several miscarriages, which rumor blamed on the machinations of the empress Eusebia.
- Flavius Claudius Constantinus, son of Constantine, and emperor with his brothers Constantius and Constans from AD 337 to 340.
- Flavius Julius Constantius, son of Constantine, and emperor with his brothers Constantinus and Constans from AD 337 to 361.
- Flavius Julius Constans, son of Constantine, and emperor with his brothers Constantinus and Constantius from AD 337 to 350.
- Flavius Claudius Constantius Gallus, named Caesar by his cousin, Constantius II, in AD 351, but put to death in 354.
- Flavius Claudius Julianus, emperor from AD 361 to 363.
- Flavius Dalmatius, son of Dalmatius the censor, and nephew of Constantine; he was proclaimed Caesar in 335, but slain by his soldiers following Constantine's death in 337.
- Flavius Hannibalianus, son of Dalmatius the censor, and nephew of Constantine, who probably intended to place him at the head of a campaign against the Sassanid Empire, but this plan ended with the emperor's death in AD 337, and Hannibalianus was slain in the turmoil that followed.
- Flavius Nepotianus, son of Eutropia, and nephew of Constantine, in AD 350 he revolted against Magnentius, but his small force, composed of ordinary citizens and gladiators, was quickly defeated by Magnentius' magister officiorum, Marcellinus. Nepotianus and his mother were put to death.
- Constantia, daughter of Constantius II, and wife of the emperor Gratian.
- Anastasia, daughter of Hannibalianus and Constantina.

=== Later emperors ===
- Flavius Magnus Magnentius, an usurper who revolted against the emperor Constans, and was proclaimed emperor in AD 350. After his defeat by Constantius II in 353, he fell on his sword.
- Flavius Jovianus, emperor from AD 363 to 364.
- Flavius Valentinianus, or Valentinian the Great, emperor from AD 364 to 375. He associated his brother, Valens, with him in the empire, giving Valens the eastern provinces, while he retained the west.
- Flavius Valens, the brother of Valentinian I, emperor of the east from AD 364 to 378.
- Flavius Gratianus, the elder son of Valentinian I, emperor of the west with his brother, Valentinian II, from AD 375 to 383.
- Flavius Valentinianus, or Valentinian II, the younger son of Valentinian I, emperor of the west with his brother, Gratian, from AD 375 to 383, with Magnus Maximus from 383 to 388, then sole emperor of the west until his death in 392.
- Flavius Theodosius, or Theodosius the Great, emperor of the east from AD 379 to 392, and sole emperor from 392 to 395.
- Flavius Magnus Maximus, commander of the Roman army in Britain, he claimed the throne of the western empire on the death of Gratian, and was recognized as co-emperor with Valentinian II until his defeat by Theodosius in 388.
- Flavius Victor, the son of Magnus Maximus, who appointed him co-emperor in AD 384. He was put to death by Theodosius following his father's defeat in 388.
- Flavius Eugenius, elevated by Arbogast to the western empire following the death of Valentinian II in AD 392; he was defeated and killed by Theodosius in 394.
- Flavius Honorius, the younger son of Theodosius; emperor of the west from AD 395 to 423.
- Flavius Arcadius, son of Theodosius; emperor of the east from AD 395 to 408
- Flavius Petrus Sabbatius Justinianus, or Justinian, nephew of Justin I, and emperor from AD 527 to 565.
- Flavius Justinus, the nephew of Justinian, emperor from AD 565 to 574.
- Flavius Tiberius Constantinus, emperor from AD 574 to 582.
- Flavius Mauricius Tiberius, or Maurice, emperor from AD 582 to 602.
- Flavius Phocas, emperor from AD 602 to 610.
- Flavius Heraclius, emperor from AD 610 to 641.
- Flavius Leo, emperor from AD 886 to 912.

== Flavii in fiction ==
- The character Flavius in Shakespeare's play Julius Caesar is based on Lucius Caesetius Flavus, a member of the Caesetia gens.
- Flavius Maximus, a character in the Star Trek episode "Bread and Circuses."
- Chancellor (later President) Flavia is a fictional Time Lady in Doctor Who, played by Dinah Sheridan.
- Flavius, a slave of and friend the title character in Anne Rice's novel "Pandora", part of The Vampire Chronicles.
- Flavius, part of Katniss Everdeen's prep team along with Venia and Octavia in the Hunger Games books.
- Flavia Gemina, the main character in Caroline Lawrence's novels The Roman Mysteries.
- Flavius Metallus, a member of Caesar's staff in Assassin's Creed Origins.

== Flavianus ==
Flavianus is the adjectival form of the name and was used as a cognomen. It is sometimes anglicized as Flavian.

== Flavian legions ==
Some Roman legions were called Flavia, as they had been levied by the Flavian emperors:

- Legio IV Flavia Felix
- Legio XVI Flavia Firma
- Legio I Flavia Constantia
- Legio I Flavia Gallicana Constantia
- Legio I Flavia Martis
- Legio I Flavia Pacis
- Legio I Flavia Theodosiana
- Legio II Flavia Constantia
- Legio II Flavia Virtutis
- Legio III Flavia Salutis

== See also ==
- People named Flavianus or Flavian
- List of Roman gentes

== Bibliography ==
- Marcus Tullius Cicero, Epistulae ad Atticum, Epistulae ad Familiares, Epistulae ad Quintum Fratrem, In Verrem, Pro Cluentio, Pro Quinto Roscio Comoedo.
- Pseudo-Brutus, Epistulae ad Ciceronem.
- Gaius Julius Caesar (attributed), De Bello Hispaniensis (On the War in Spain).
- Cornelius Nepos, De Viris Illustribus (On the Lives of Famous Men).
- Titus Livius (Livy), History of Rome.
- Valerius Maximus, Factorum ac Dictorum Memorabilium (Memorable Facts and Sayings).
- Quintus Asconius Pedianus, Commentarius in Oratio Ciceronis Pro Milone (Commentary on Cicero's Oration Pro Milone).
- Publius Cornelius Tacitus, Annales, Historiae.
- Lucius Mestrius Plutarchus (Plutarch), Lives of the Noble Greeks and Romans.
- Gaius Suetonius Tranquillus, De Vita Caesarum (Lives of the Caesars, or The Twelve Caesars).
- Appianus Alexandrinus (Appian), Bellum Civile (The Civil War), Bellum Hannibalicum (The War with Hannibal).
- Lucius Cassius Dio (Cassius Dio), Roman History.
- Herodianus, Tes Meta Marcon Basileas Istoria (History of the Empire from the Death of Marcus Aurelius).
- Philostratus, The Life of Apollonius of Tyana.
- Aelius Lampridius, Aelius Spartianus, Flavius Vopiscus, Julius Capitolinus, Trebellius Pollio, and Vulcatius Gallicanus, Historia Augusta (Augustan History).
- Eusebius Sophronius Hieronymus (St. Jerome), De Viris Illustribus (On Famous Men).
- Augustine of Hippo, De Vita Beata (On the Blessed Life).
- Pieter Burmann, Anthologia Latina (Latin Anthology), ed. Wernsdorf, (1759–1778).
- Real Academia de la Historia, Memorias de La Real Academia de la Historia, vol. 2 (1796).
- Dictionary of Greek and Roman Biography and Mythology, William Smith, ed., Little, Brown and Company, Boston (1849).
- Carl Eduard Zachariae von Lingenthal (ed.), Jus Graeco-Romanum, part III, T. O. Weigel, Leipzig (1857).
- Schaff–Herzog Encyclopedia of Religious Knowledge, Johann Jakob Herzog and Philip Schaff, eds., Funk & Wagnalls, New York (1882–1884).
- René Cagnat et alii, L'Année épigraphique (The Year in Epigraphy, abbreviated AE), Presses Universitaires de France (1888–present).
- August Pauly; Georg Wissowa; Wilhelm Kroll; Kurt Witte; Karl Mittelhaus; Konrat Ziegler, eds. (1894–1980). Paulys Realencyclopädie der classischen Altertumswissenschaft [Scientific Encyclopedia of the Knowledge of Classical Antiquities]. Stuttgart: J. B. Metzler.
- George Davis Chase, "The Origin of Roman Praenomina", in Harvard Studies in Classical Philology, vol. VIII, pp. 103–184 (1897).
- Paul von Rohden, Elimar Klebs, & Hermann Dessau, Prosopographia Imperii Romani (The Prosopography of the Roman Empire, abbreviated PIR), Berlin (1898).
- F.W. Bussell, The Roman Empire: Essays on the Constitutional History from the Accession of Domitian (81 A.D.) to the Retirement of Nicephorus III (1081 A.D.), vol. I, Longmans, Green, and Co., London (1910).
- Luigi Sorricchio, Hatria, Tipografia del Senato, Rome (1911).
- T. Robert S. Broughton, The Magistrates of the Roman Republic, American Philological Association (1952–1986).
- D.P. Simpson, Cassell's Latin and English Dictionary, Macmillan Publishing Company, New York (1963).
- Jones, A.H.M.; J. R. Martindale & J. Morris, eds. (1971–1992). Prosopography of the Later Roman Empire. Cambridge University Press. ISBN 0-521-07233-6. Available online.
- Guido Bastianini, "Lista dei prefetti d'Egitto dal 30^{a} al 299^{p}" (List of the Prefects of Egypt from 30 BC to AD 299), in Zeitschrift für Papyrologie und Epigraphik, vol. 17 (1975).
- Gerhard Rösch, Onoma Basileias: Studien zum offiziellen Gebrauch der Kaisertitel in spätantiker und frühbyzantinischer Zeit, Verlag der österreichischen Akademie der Wissenschaften (1978), ISBN 978-3-7001-0260-1.
- Paul A. Gallivan, "The Fasti for A.D. 70–96", in Classical Quarterly, vol. 31, pp. 186–220 (1981).
- Benet Salway, "What’s in a Name? A Survey of Roman Onomastic Practice from c. 700 B.C. to A.D. 700", in Journal of Roman Studies, vol. 84, pp. 124–145 (1994).
- J.E.H. Spaul, "Governors of Tingitana", in Antiquités Africaines, vol. 30 (1994).
- John C. Traupman, The New College Latin & English Dictionary, Bantam Books, New York (1995).
- Peter Weiß, "Neue Militärdiplome", in Zeitschrift für Papyrologie und Epigraphik, vol. 117 (1997).
- Noel Lenski, Failure of Empire: Valens and the Roman State in the Fourth Century A. D., University of California Press, Berkeley (2002).
- Werner Eck and Andreas Pangerl, "Neue Militärdiplome für die Truppen der mauretanischen Provinzen", in Zeitschrift für Papyrologie und Epigraphik, vol. 153 (2005).
- Paul Christesen "Imagining Olympia: Hippias of Elis and the First Olympic Victor List", in A Tall Order: Writing the Social History of the Ancient World, Jean-Jacques Aubert, Zsuzsanna Várhelyi, eds., Walter de Gruyter (2012), pp. 319–356.
