= Flavian =

Flavian may refer to:

== People ==
- A member of the Flavian dynasty of Roman emperors, during the late 1st century AD, or their works
- Flavian, one of the Martyrs of Carthage under Valerian
- Flavian of Ricina (fl. 3rd century), bishop and martyr in Italy
- Flavian I of Antioch (c. 320–404), Patriarch of Antioch
- Archbishop Flavian of Constantinople (died 449), saint, martyr and Archbishop of Constantinople
- Patriarch Fravitta of Constantinople (died 489), Patriarch of Constantinople
- Flavian II of Antioch (died 518), Patriarch of Antioch
- Flavian Aponso (born 1952), Sri Lankan cricketer
- Flavian Matindi Kassala (born 1967), Tanzanian Roman Catholic prelate and Bishop of the Diocese of Geita, Tanzania
- Flavian Laplante (1907–1981), Canadian Catholic missionary in Bangladesh
- Flavian Zeija (born 1969), Ugandan lawyer, academic and judge, Chief Justice of Uganda since 2026

== Ships ==
- SS Flavian, an Italian cruise ship

== See also ==
- Flavian Amphitheater, Rome (better known as the Colosseum)
- Constantinian dynasty, also called the Neo-Flavian dynasty
- Flavia (gens)
- Flavianus
