= Flavianus =

Flavianus – the adjectival form of the Latin name Flavius – may refer to:

- Marcus Pompeius Silvanus Staberius Flavianus, 1st-century Roman consul
- Lucius Septimius Flavianus Flavillianus, 3rd-century Roman athlete
- Marcus Cocceius Anicius Faustus Flavianus, 3rd-century Roman consul
- Flavianus (prefect of Egypt), 4th-century prefect of Roman Egypt
- Virius Nicomachus Flavianus, also known as Flavianus the Elder, 4th-century Roman consul and prefect of Italy
- Nicomachus Flavianus, also known as Flavianus the Younger, son of Virius Nicomachus Flavianus
- Flavianus of Avellino (d. 311), priest from Antioch, see Modestinus, Florentinus and Flavianus
- Flavian of Constantinople (d. 449), patriarch
- Fravitta of Constantinople, also known as Flavian II of Constantinople (d. 490), patriarch
- Flavian I of Antioch, 4th-century archbishop
- Flavian II of Antioch, late 5th- and early 6th-century archbishop
- Flavianus of Adramyttium, 5th-century bishop of Adramyttium
- Flavianus (bishop of Cotenna), 6th-century bishop of Cotenna
- Flavianus Michael Malke (1858–1915), Syrian Catholic eparch of Cizre

== See also ==
- Flavian (disambiguation)
