= July 20 (Eastern Orthodox liturgics) =

Day in the Eastern Orthodox liturgical calendar

Eastern Orthodox liturgical calendar
July 19	July 20	July 21
July 20 O.S. ≍ August 2 N.S. July 20 N.S ≍ July 7 O.S.

An Eastern Orthodox cross

July 20 in Eastern Orthodox liturgical calendars is a feast day and a day of commemoration of saints and martyrs. Although some Orthodox churches use the Revised Julian Calendar and others use the traditional Julian calendar, the fixed commemorations for their respective July 20 are broadly the same, no matter which calendar is used. (Note: Despite the dates being the same, the days to which they refer typically differ by 13 days. The notation Old Style or O.S. is sometimes used to indicate a date in the traditional Julian Calendar (the "Old Calendar"). The notation New Style or N.S. indicates a date in the Revised Julian calendar (the "New Calendar").)

== Saints ==
- Holy and glorious Prophet Elijah the Thesbite, whose fiery ascent as it were into the Heavens we celebrate (9th century BC) (Note: "In Constantinople, the Prophets Moses, Aaron and Elisha were also commemorated today (cf. Delahaye: Syn. Cp. p. 832).") (Note: MAGNIFICATION: "We magnify you, Glorious Prophet Elias. And we venerate your fiery ascent to heaven in the flesh." KONDAK, TONE 2: "O greatly renowned Prophet Elias, who foresaw the great deeds of our God; you stopped the rains of heaven by your command. Intercede for us with the only Lover-of-Mankind.") (Note: "On Mount Carmel, the holy prophet Elias.") (Note: Name days celebrated today include: Elias, Ilias, Elijah, Eliana, Liana (Ἠλίας).)
- Saint Flavianus II of Antioch, Patriarch and Confessor (518)
- Saint Elias I of Jerusalem, Patriarch and Confessor (518)

== Pre-Schism Western saints ==
- Saint Rheticus (Rheticius, Rhetice), a Gallo-Roman who became Bishop of Autun in France (334)
- Saint Aurelius of Carthage, Bishop of Carthage in North Africa (429)
- Saint Severa of St Gemma, Abbess of St Gemma (later Sainte-Sevère) in Villeneuve near Bourges, the sister of St Modoald, Bishop of Trier (c. 680)
- Saint Wulmar of Boulogne (Ulmar, Ulmer, Vilmarus, Volmar), founder of the monastery of Samer near Boulogne, later called Saint-Vulmaire (689) (Note: Born near Boulogne in the north of France, he became a monk and later founded the monastery of Samer near Boulogne, later called Saint-Vulmaire (fr) after him . He also founded a convent at Wierre-aux-Bois.) (Note: See: (in French) Abbaye Saint-Wulmer de Samer. Wikipédia. (French Wikipedia).)
- Saint Severa of Oehren, Abbess of Oehren near Trier in Germany (c. 750) (Note: "At Treves, St. Severa, virgin.")
- Saint Ansegisus, a monk at Fontenelle Abbey in France at the age of eighteen, he later restored several monasteries (c. 833)
- Hieromartyr Paul the Deacon of Córdoba (851) (Note: A deacon in Cordoba in Spain who belonged to the monastery of St Zoilus and who was very zealous in ministering to Christians imprisoned by the Muslims. He was beheaded for the Orthodox Faith and his relics were enshrined in the church of St Zoilus.) (Note: "At Cordova, St. Paul, deacon and martyr. For rebuking Mahometan princes for their impiety and cruelty, and preaching Christ courageously, he was put to death, and went to his reward in heaven.")
- Saint Ethelwida (Ealhswith, Elswith), widow of King Alfred the Great (902) (Note: Wife of King Alfred the Great, after his death she became a nun at the convent which she had founded in Winchester.) (Note: "ETHELWIDA, or EALSITHA, the widow of the great King Alfred, was the daughter of the Earl Ethelred and Edburga of Mercia. She began the foundation of the convent for women at Winchester, in conjunction with her husband, and after his death she is said to have retired to it herself. The first Abbess appointed was Etheldreda. who became the mistress of St. Edburga. Ethelwida, however, did not live to see her work completed. She survived Alfred but a few years, which she spent in great holiness of life and the practices of devotion.")

== Post-Schism Orthodox saints ==
- Martyr Salome of Jerusalem and Kartli, who suffered under the Persians (13th century)
- Saint Abramius of Galich, near Chukhloma Lake, disciple of Saint Sergius of Radonezh (1375)
- Saint Elias (Chavchavadze) the Righteous of Georgia (1907)

=== New martyrs and confessors ===
- New Hieromartyr Constantine Slovtsov, Priests (1918)
- New Martyrs Lydia, with soldiers Alexei and Cyril, near Ufa (1928)
- New Hieromartyrs at Voronezh (1930):

- Archimandrite Tikhon (Krechkov);
- Hieromonks George (Pozharov) and Cosmas (Vyaznikov);
- Priests John Steblin-Kamensky, (Note: See: (in Russian) Стеблин-Каменский, Иван Георгиевич. Википедии. (Russian Wikipedia).) Sergius Gortinsky, Theodore Yakovlev, Alexander Arkhangelsky, (Note: See: (in Russian) Архангельский, Александр Николаевич (новомученик). Википедии. (Russian Wikipedia).) and George Nikitin;
- Martyrs Euthymius Grebenshchikov and Peter Vyaznikov.

- New Hieromartyr Alexis Znamensky, Priest (1938)
- New Hieromartyr Theodore Abrosimov (1941)
- New Martyrs of Paris: (Note: "The Holy Synod of the Ecumenical Patriarchate, which is based in Istanbul (Turkey) resolved, during its session of 16 January [2004] on the Canonization of Fr Alexis Medvedkov (1867 – 1934), also of Fr Dimitri Klepinine (1904-1944) of Mother Maria (Skobtsova) (1891-1945) and of their companions George (Yuri) Skobtsov (1921-1944) and Elie Fondaminskii (1880-1942), outstanding personalities of the spiritual history of the Russian emigration in France... ...Their liturgical commemoration has been fixed by the Patriarchate on 20 July, the feast of the Holy Prophet Elijah.")

- Archpriest Alexis Medvedkov, of Ugine, France (1934);
- Elias Fondaminsky (1942);
- Priest Demetrius Klepinine (1944);
- George Skobtsov (1944); and
- Nun Maria (Skobtsova) (1945)

== Other commemorations ==
- Icon of the Mother of God "Chukhloma" from Galich (Galich-Chukhlomsk - "Tenderness") (1350) (Note: See: (in Russian) Галичская икона Божией Матери. Википедии. (Russian Wikipedia).) (see also: May 28, August 15)
- Icon of the Mother of God "Orshansk" (1631) (see also: September 5)
- Icon of the Mother of God "Abalatsk" ("Sign") (1637) (see also: November 27)
- Uncovering of the relics (1649) of Hieromartyr Athanasius of Brest, Hegumen of the Monastery of St Simeon Stylites in Brest (1648)
- Repose of Priest Valentine Amphiteatrov of Moscow (1908)
- Repose of Schema-nun Sarah of Borodino (1908)

== Icon gallery ==
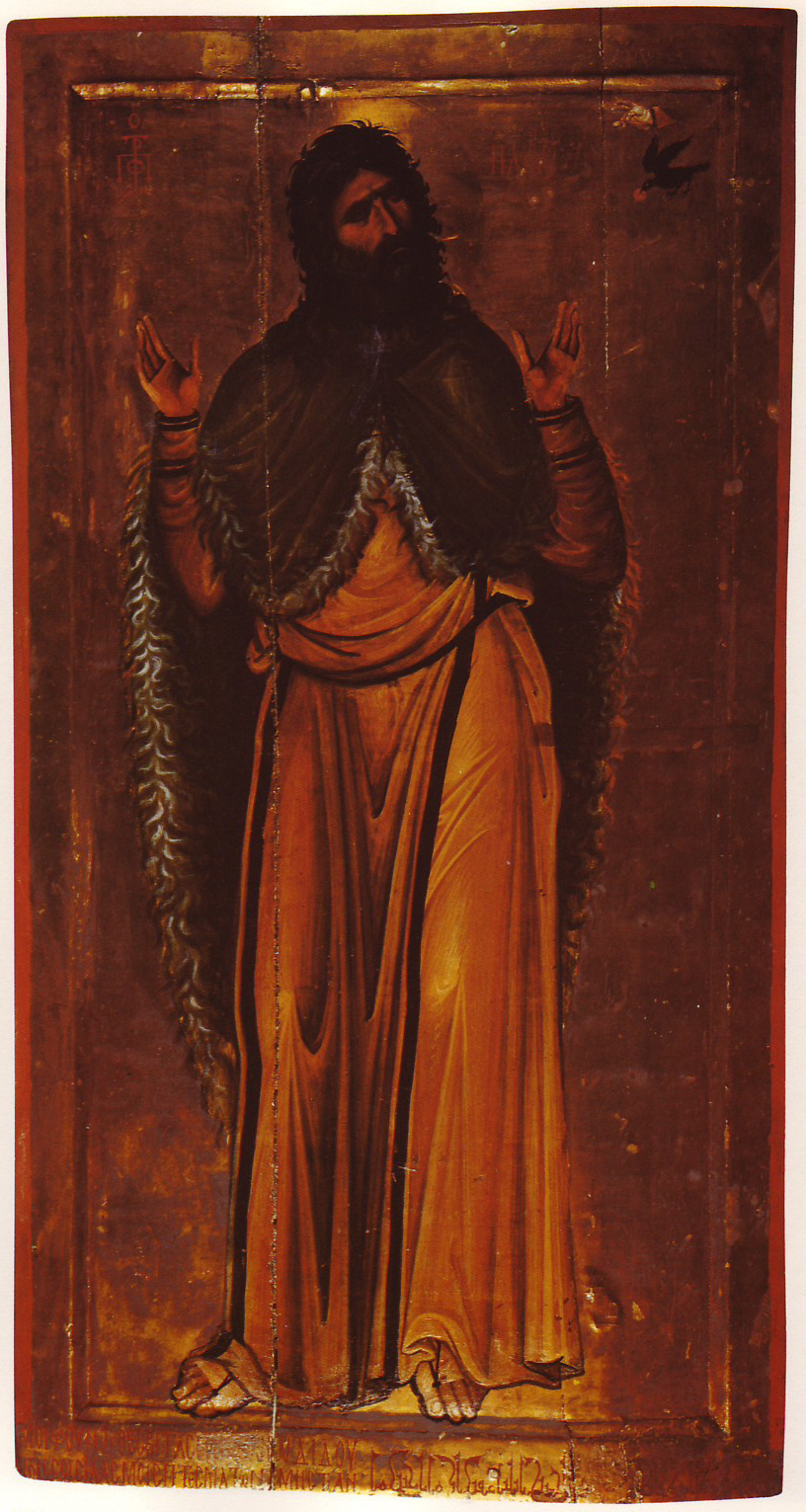
Prophet Elijah the Thesbite.

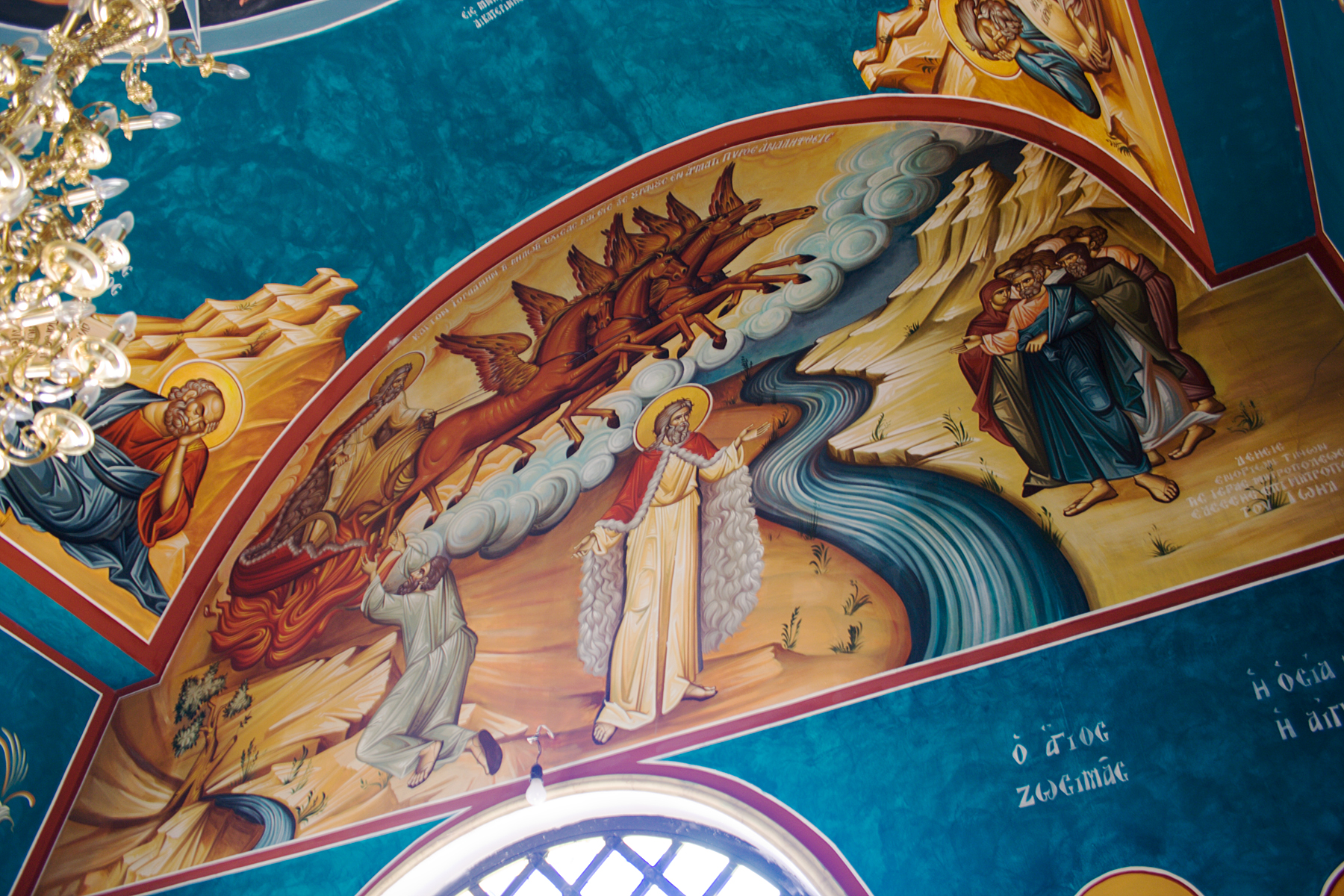
Elijah's fiery ascent into heaven (St. John the Baptist Church at the Jordan River).

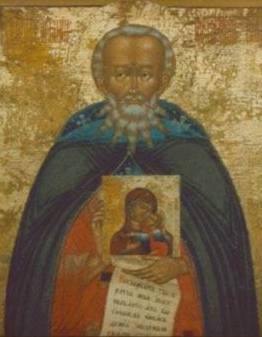
St. Abramius of Galich.

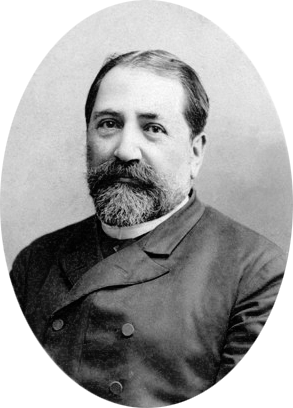
St. Elias (Chavchavadze).

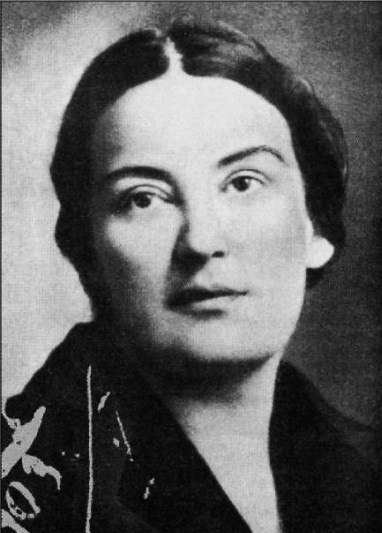
St. Maria (Skobtsova) of Paris.

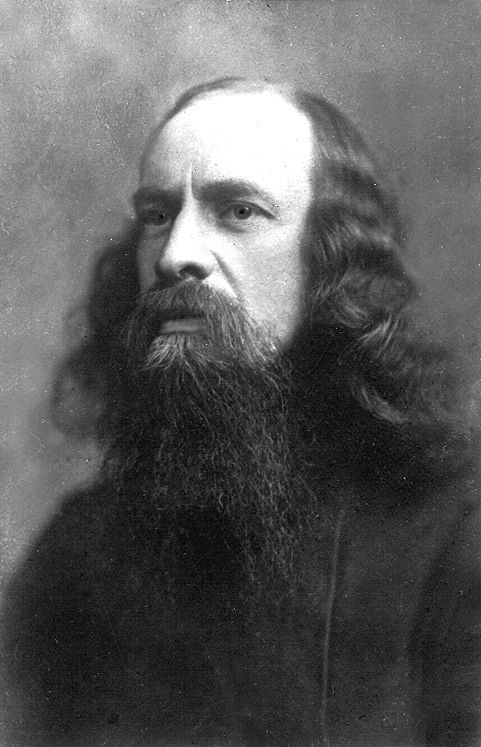
New Hieromartyr John Steblin-Kamensky, priest.

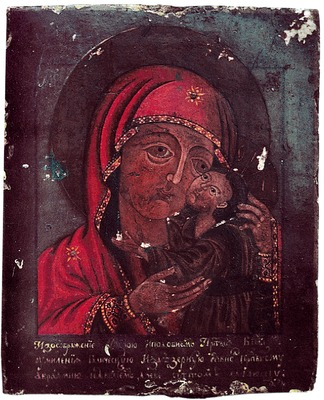
Galich-Chukhlomsk Icon of the Mother of God.

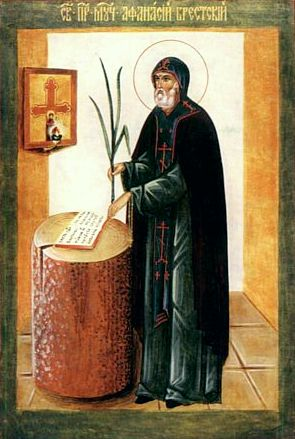
Hieromartyr Athanasius of Brest.

== Sources ==
- July 20/August 2. Orthodox Calendar (PRAVOSLAVIE.RU).
- August 2 / July 20. HOLY TRINITY RUSSIAN ORTHODOX CHURCH (A parish of the Patriarchate of Moscow).
- July 20. OCA - The Lives of the Saints.
- July 20. The Year of Our Salvation - Holy Transfiguration Monastery, Brookline, Massachusetts.
- The Autonomous Orthodox Metropolia of Western Europe and the Americas (ROCOR). St. Hilarion Calendar of Saints for the year of our Lord 2004. St. Hilarion Press (Austin, TX). p. 53.
- The Twentieth Day of the Month of July. Orthodoxy in China.
- July 20. Latin Saints of the Orthodox Patriarchate of Rome.
- The Roman Martyrology. Transl. by the Archbishop of Baltimore. Last Edition, According to the Copy Printed at Rome in 1914. Revised Edition, with the Imprimatur of His Eminence Cardinal Gibbons. Baltimore: John Murphy Company, 1916. pp. 214–215.
- Rev. Richard Stanton. A Menology of England and Wales, or, Brief Memorials of the Ancient British and English Saints Arranged According to the Calendar, Together with the Martyrs of the 16th and 17th Centuries. London: Burns & Oates, 1892. pp. 348–349.

Greek Sources

- Great Synaxaristes: (in Greek) 20 ΙΟΥΛΙΟΥ. ΜΕΓΑΣ ΣΥΝΑΞΑΡΙΣΤΗΣ.
- (in Greek) Συναξαριστής. 20 Ιουλίου. ECCLESIA.GR. (H ΕΚΚΛΗΣΙΑ ΤΗΣ ΕΛΛΑΔΟΣ).
- (in Greek) 20/07/2026. Ορθόδοξος Συναξαριστής.

Russian Sources

- (in Russian) 2 августа (20 июля). Православная Энциклопедия под редакцией Патриарха Московского и всея Руси Кирилла (электронная версия). (Orthodox Encyclopedia - Pravenc.ru).
- (in Russian) 20 июля по старому стилю / 2 августа по новому стилю. СПЖ "Союз православных журналистов". 2026.
- (in Russian) 20 июля (ст.ст.) 2 августа 2026 (нов. ст.). Русская Православная Церковь Отдел внешних церковных связей. (DECR).
