= Pertinax the Younger =

Roman Politician

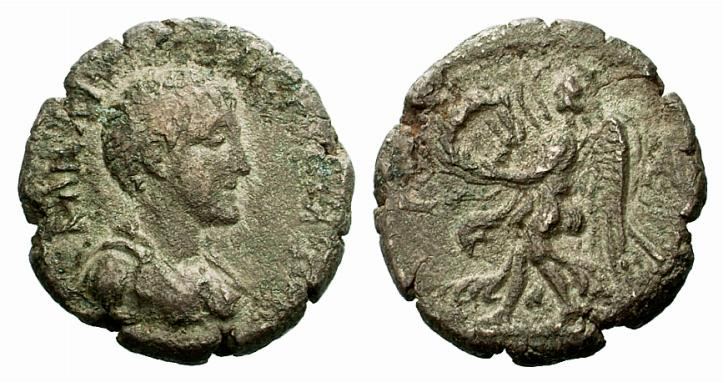
Tetradrachm marked KAI[C]AP [ΠΕΡΤΙΝΑΞ] ("Caesar Pertinax")

Publius Helvius Pertinax the Younger (also Pertinax Minor; 180–212) was a Roman politician, suffect consul of 212 AD and son of Emperor Pertinax. After the latter came to power in 193 AD, the Senate wanted to proclaim Pertinax the Younger as Caesar, but the emperor rejected this proposal. Pertinax the Elder was killed on the 88th day of his reign. His son survived and under Septimius Severus became a flamen of his father's cult, and under Caracalla a suffect consul. He was later executed as a possible contender for Imperial power.

== Biography ==
Publius Helvius Pertinax the Younger was the son of Pertinax, a successful military commander in the Roman-Parthian and Marcomannic Wars, and a Provincial Governor of Moesia, Dacia, Syria and Britain. His mother was Flavia Titiana, daughter of the senator Titus Flavius Sulpicianus. A daughter was also born into this family, but is mentioned in only one source, but there is no information about her; even her name is unknown.

Pertinax the Younger first appears in connection with the events of January 193 AD, when his father was proclaimed emperor after the assassination of Commodus. The son of the new emperor was then still a teenager, so historians date his birth to approximately 180 AD. The senators, having proclaimed Pertinax the Elder emperor, wanted to make his wife Augusta and his son Caesar, but these honors were rejected: "Let him deserve it", Pertinax said about his son. Nevertheless, coins with his image and the title Caesar were minted for some time in the eastern provinces (in particular, in Egypt).

During the reign of his father, Pertinax the Younger lived in the house of his maternal grandfather and remained a private citizen. At the end of March 193 AD, Emperor Pertinax was killed by the Praetorian guard, but his son's life was spared. The governor of Pannonia Superior, Lucius Septimius Severus declared himself avenger of the deceased emperor, occupied Rome, proclaimed himself emperor and won the civil war. Septimius Severus established the cult of Pertinax and made Pertinax the Younger a flamen (priest) of this cult.

Pertinax the Younger later served as suffect consul (presumably in 212 AD). However, in the same year he was executed by order of Caracalla. According to Julius Capitolinus, the emperor believed Pertinax was seeking power and that he was very popular and therefore dangerous. A mocking joke by Pertinax at Caracalla's expense made in connection with his murder of his brother Geta also probably contributed to his execution: Pertinax proposed calling the emperor the agnomen "Getacus" analogous to the title "Germanicus".
