= Patriarch Timothy I =

Patriarch Timothy I may refer to:

- Pope Timothy I of Alexandria, Pope of Alexandria & Patriarch of the See of St. Mark in 378–384
- Timothy I of Constantinople, Patriarch of Constantinople in 511–518
- Timothy I (Nestorian patriarch), Catholicus-Patriarch of the East in 780–823
