= September 5 (Eastern Orthodox liturgics) =

Day in the Eastern Orthodox liturgical calendar

Eastern Orthodox liturgical calendar
September 4	September 5	September 6
September 5 O.S. ≍ September 18 N.S. September 5 N.S ≍ August 23 O.S.

An Eastern Orthodox cross

September 5 in Eastern Orthodox liturgical calendars is a feast day and a day of commemoration of saints and martyrs. Although some Orthodox churches use the Revised Julian Calendar and others use the traditional Julian calendar, the fixed commemorations for their respective September 5 are broadly the same, no matter which calendar is used. (Note: Despite the dates being the same, the days to which they refer typically differ by 13 days. The notation Old Style or O.S. is sometimes used to indicate a date in the traditional Julian Calendar (the "Old Calendar"). The notation New Style or N.S. indicates a date in the Revised Julian calendar (the "New Calendar").)

== Saints ==
- Holy Prophet Zachariah and Righteous Elizabeth, parents of St. John the Forerunner (1st century) (Note: Name days celebrated today include: Zacharias, Zachary (Ζαχαρίας); Zacharoula (Ζαχαρούλα).) (see also: June 24)
- Martyrs Sarbel and his sister Barbe (Thathuil, Thiphael; Bebaia, Thivea) of Edessa (98-138) (see also: September 4; January 29)
- Martyr Sarbelus of Edessa (98-138)
- Virgin-martyr Rhais of Alexandria (Iraida, Raissa, Rose) (c. 308) (see also: September 23)
- Martyrs Juventinus and Maximinus, soldiers, at Antioch (361-363) (see also: October 9, October 12)
- Martyrs Urban, Theodore, Medimnus and 77 Priests and Deacons, at Nicomedia, under Valens (370) (Note: "At Constantinople, the holy martyrs Urbanus, Theodore, Menedemus, and their ecclesiastical companions, seventy-seven in number, who were put in a ship by the command of the emperor Valens, and burned on the sea for the Catholic faith.".)
- Hieromartyr Abdas (Abdias, Obadiah), Bishop of Hormidz-Ardashir, Persia, and Martyrs Hormizd and Sunin (c. 420) (see also: March 31; May 16)

== Pre-Schism Western saints ==
- Saint Herculanus, a martyr in Porto near Rome, probably under Marcus Aurelius (c. 180)
- Saints Quintius, Arcontius and Donatus, martyrs venerated in Capua and elsewhere in the south of Italy.
- Saint Obdulia, a holy virgin venerated in Toledo in Spain.
- Saint Genebald of Laon, Bishop of Laon in France and a relative of St Remigius (c. 555) (Note: He did seven years' penance for a sin he had committed.)
- Saint Victorinus, Bishop of Como in Italy and an ardent opponent of Arianism (644) (Note: "In the suburbs of Rome, blessed Victorinus, bishop and martyr, in the time of Nerva Trajan. Being renowned for sanctity and miracles, he was elected bishop of Amiterno by the whole people, but afterwards he was banished, with other servants of God, to Contigliano, where spring forth fetid sulphurous waters, and was suspended with his head downward by order of the judge Aurelian. Having for the name of Christ endured this torment for three days, he was gloriously crowned, and went victoriously to our Lord. His body was taken away by the Christians, and buried with due honors at Amiterno.")
- Saint Bertin, Abbot of Sithin (afterwards called Abbey of Saint Bertin) (c. 709) (Note: Born near Constance, he became a monk at Luxeuil in France. He helped St Omer, Bishop of Thérouanne and became Abbot of Sithin (afterwards called St Bertin). The monastery prospered under him and he founded many new monasteries.) (Note: "In the neighborhood of Terouanne, in the monastery of Sithiu, St. Bertin, abbot.")

== Post-Schism Orthodox saints ==
- Martyrdom of the Holy passion-bearer Gleb of Russia, in holy baptism David (1015) (Note: "[Russian, Polish, and Lithuanian Kalendars, on July 24. Their Translation on May 2. Romanus or Boris died July 24, David or Gleb on Sept. 5. On which day the Bollandists give their acts. Authorities: Nestor (A.D. 1115), Chronicon. The Acts in the Bollandists are not correct.]" "The body of Gleb was translated by order of Jaroslaff to Wissegorod, and laid beside that of his brother Boris. Both were uncorrupt.")
- Martyrdom of Venerable Athanasius of Brest, Abbot, of Brest, by the Latins (1648) (Note: St Athanasius opposed the union of Brest and went to the Polish Sejm or parliament where he publicly warned it of God’s wrath for forcibly imposing such a union of the churches. After the defeat of the Polish forces by the armies of Hetman Bohdan Khmelnytsky in 1648, St Athanasius was taken into custody by the Poles, tortured for several days and then he was taken to a wooded area where he was obliged to dig his own grave before being shot twice in the head and buried alive.)

=== New martyrs and confessors ===
- New Hieromartyr Alexis (Belkovsky), Archbishop of Great Ustiug (1937) (Note: See: (in Russian) Алексий (Бельковский). Википедии. (Russian Wikipedia).) (see also: December 2)
- Martyr Euthymius Kochev (1937)
- New Martyrs of the Czech-Slovak Church (1942): (Note: The group of New Martyrs will be celebrated annually on September 5, the date of the martyrdom of Ján Sonnevend.)

- New Hieromartyrs Vladimír Petřek (cs) and Václav Čikl (cs), priests;
- New Martyrs Ján Sonnevend (cs), Václav Ornest (cs), and Karel Louda, and their families.

== Other commemorations ==
- Appearance of Apostle Peter to Emperor Justinian at Athyra (Thrace), near Constantinople (6th century) (Note: "Consecration of the Church of the Apostle Peter, at Athyra (Thrace).")
- Orsha icon of the Theotokos (1631) (see also: July 20)
- Uncovering of the relics (2001) of Archimandrite Alexander Urodov (1961)
- Repose of Priest Hilarion Felea of Romania (1961)

== Icon gallery ==
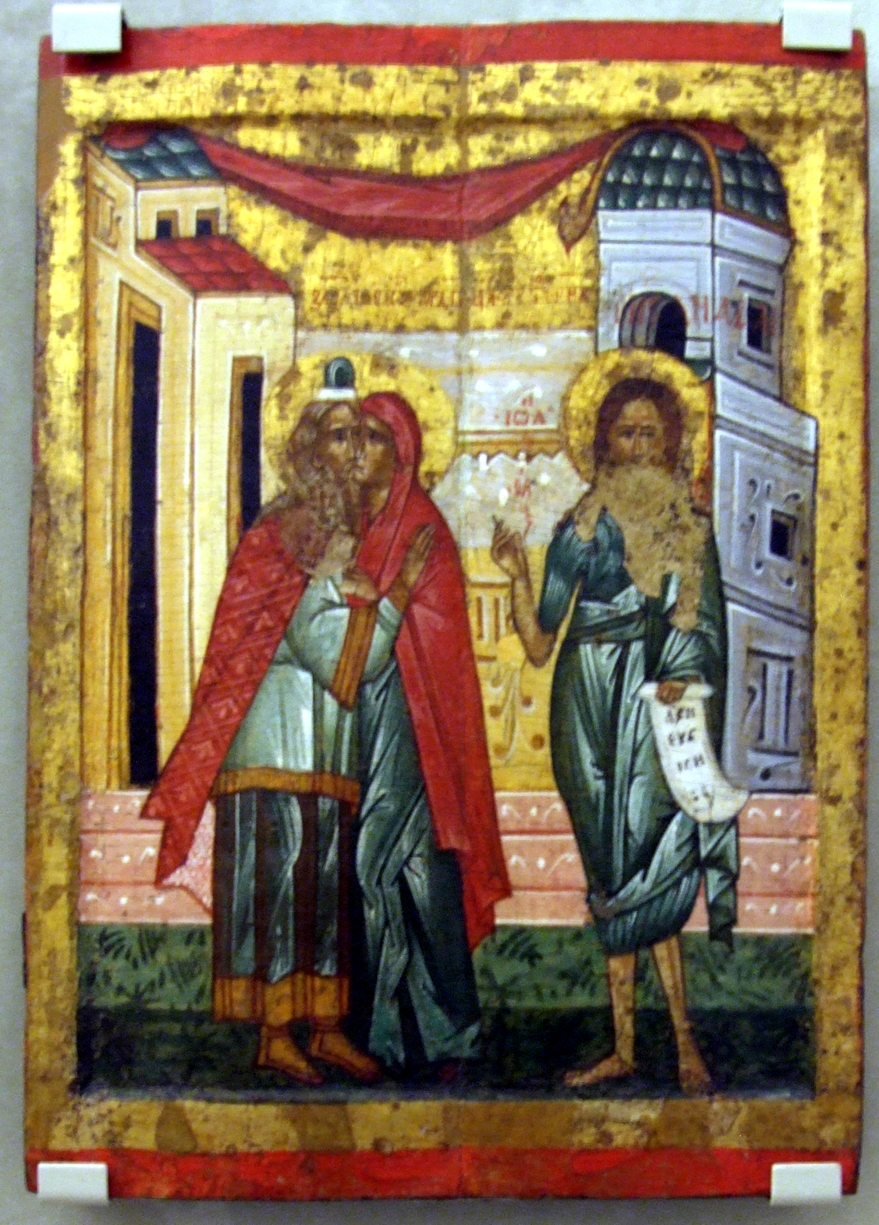
Holy Prophet Zachariah and Righteous Elizabeth, parents of St. John the Forerunner.

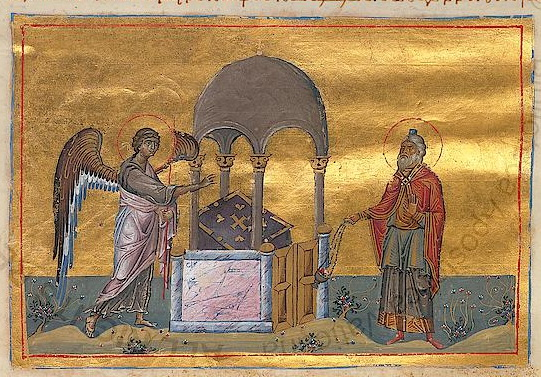
Annunciation to Zachariah.
(Menologion of Basil II, 10th century).

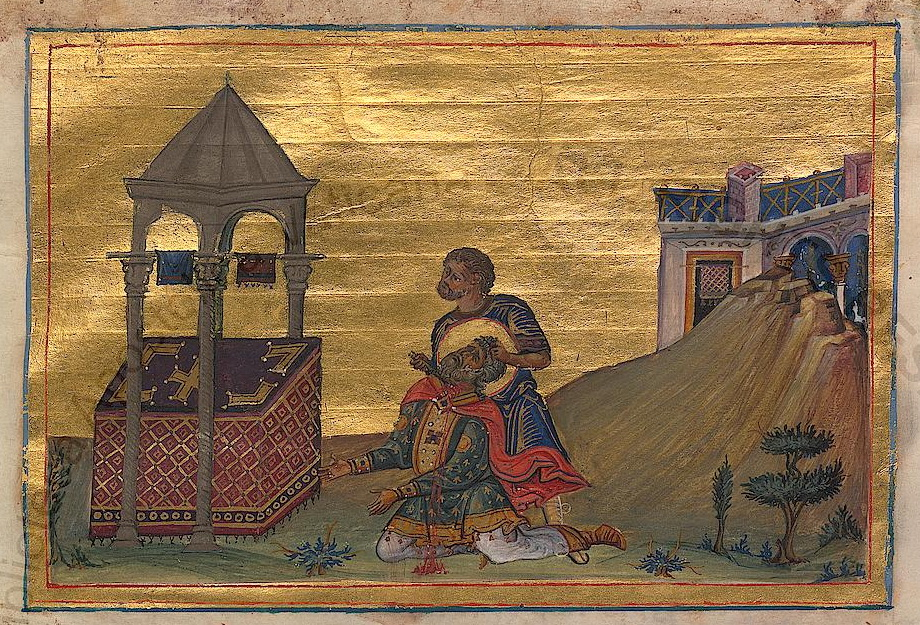
Martyrdom of Holy Prophet Zachariah.
(Menologion of Basil II, 10th century). (Note: Orthodox Christian tradition recounts that, at the time of the massacre of the Innocents, when King Herod ordered the slaughter of all males under the age of two in an attempt to prevent the prophesied Messiah from coming to Israel, Zechariah refused to divulge the whereabouts of his son (who was in hiding), and he was therefore murdered by Herod's soldiers.)

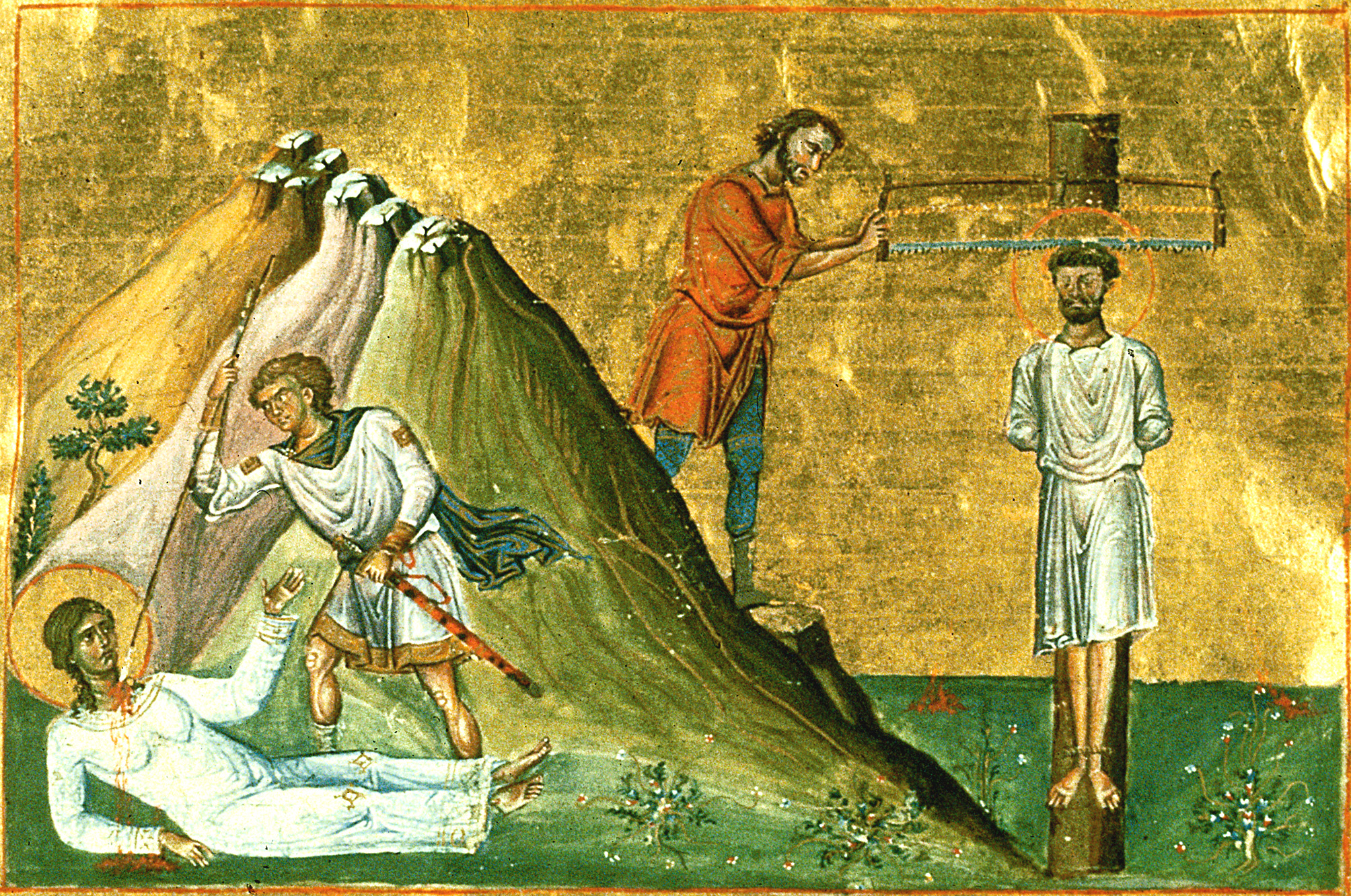
Martyrs Sarbelus (Thathuil) and his sister Bebaia, of Edessa.
(Menologion of Basil II, 10th century).

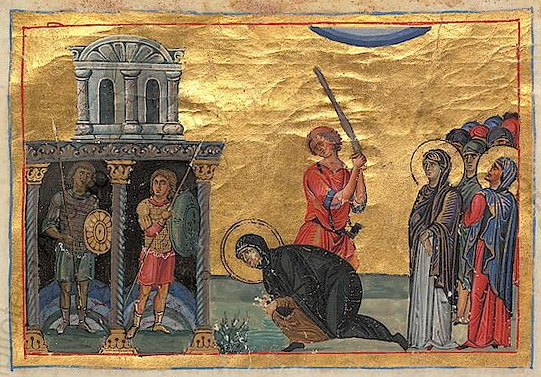
Virgin-martyr Irais (Rhais, Raissa) of Alexandria.
(Menologion of Basil II, 10th century).

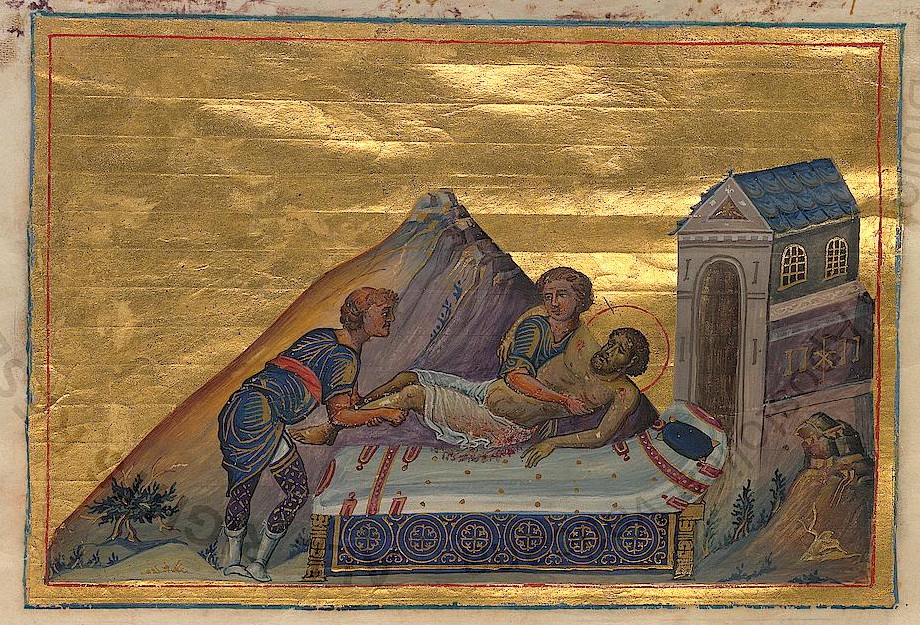
Hieromartyr Abdas (Abdias, Obadiah), Bishop of Hormidz-Ardashir, Persia.
(Menologion of Basil II, 10th century).

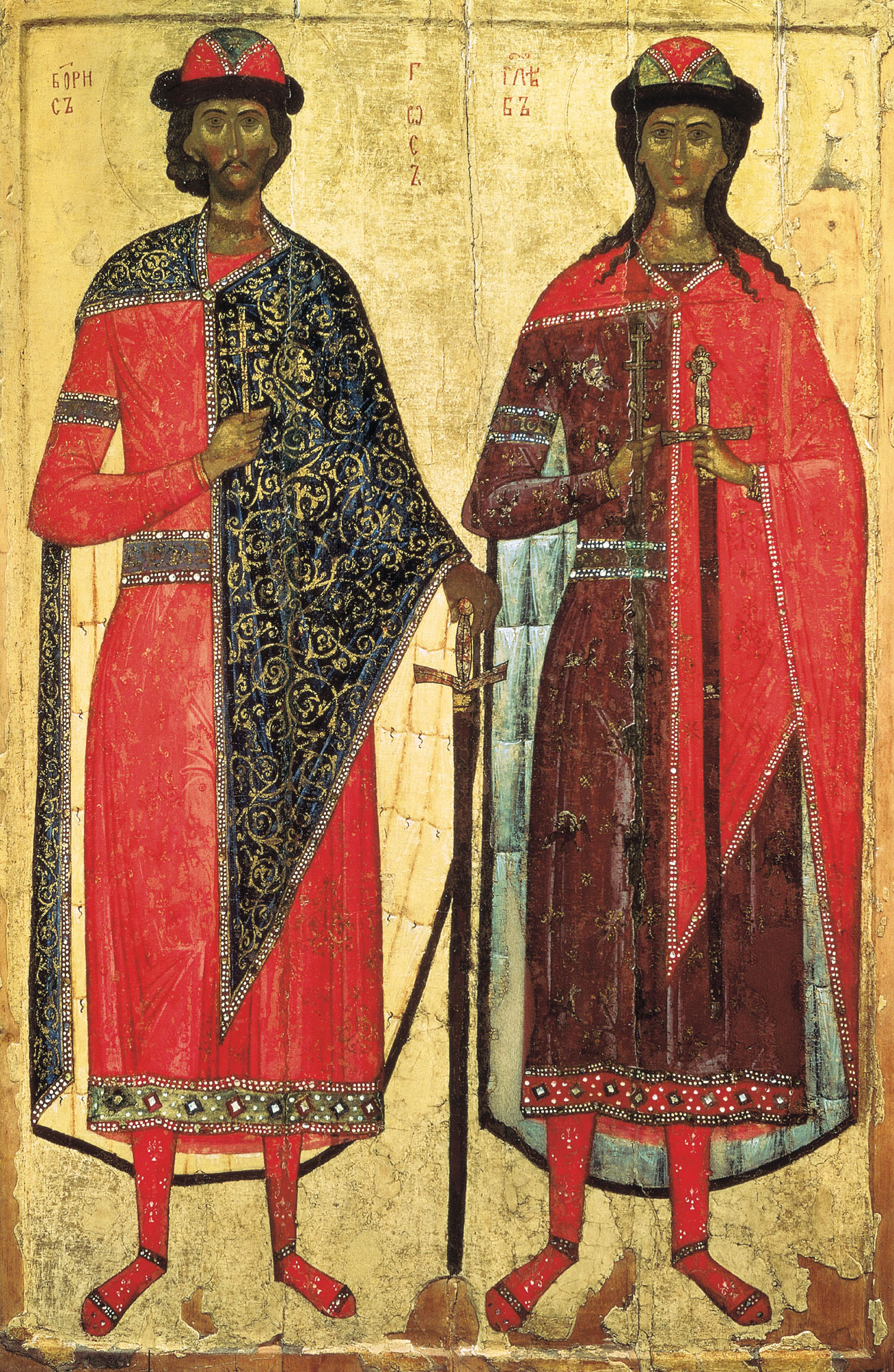
Holy passion-bearers Gleb of Russia.

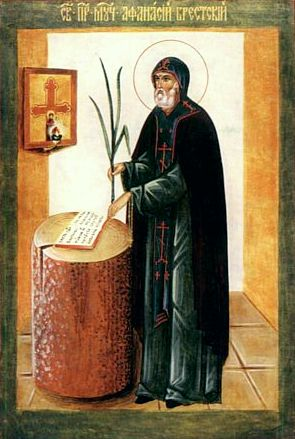
Venerable Athanasius of Brest.

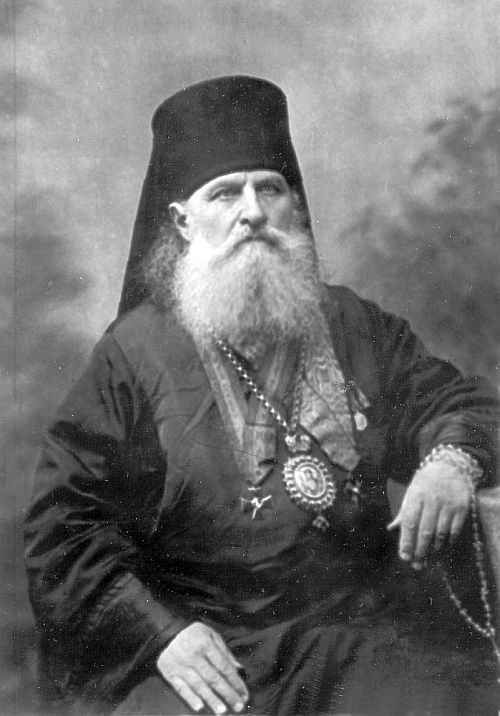
New Hieromartyr Alexis (Belkovsky), Archbishop of Great Ustiug.

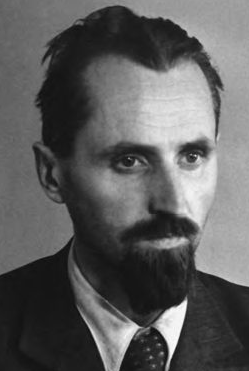
New Hieromartyr Vladimír Petřek.

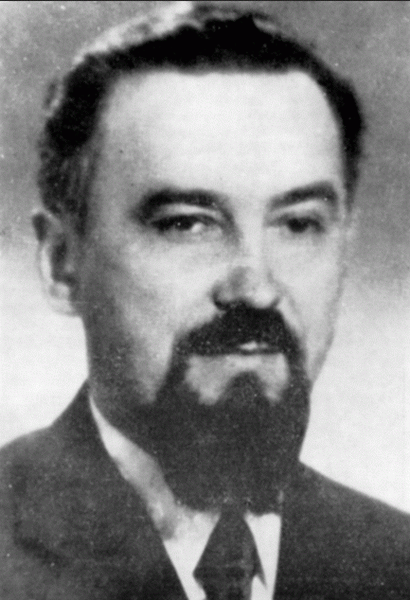
New Hieromartyr Václav Čikl.

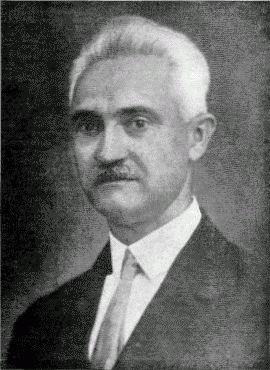
New Martyr Ján Sonnevend.

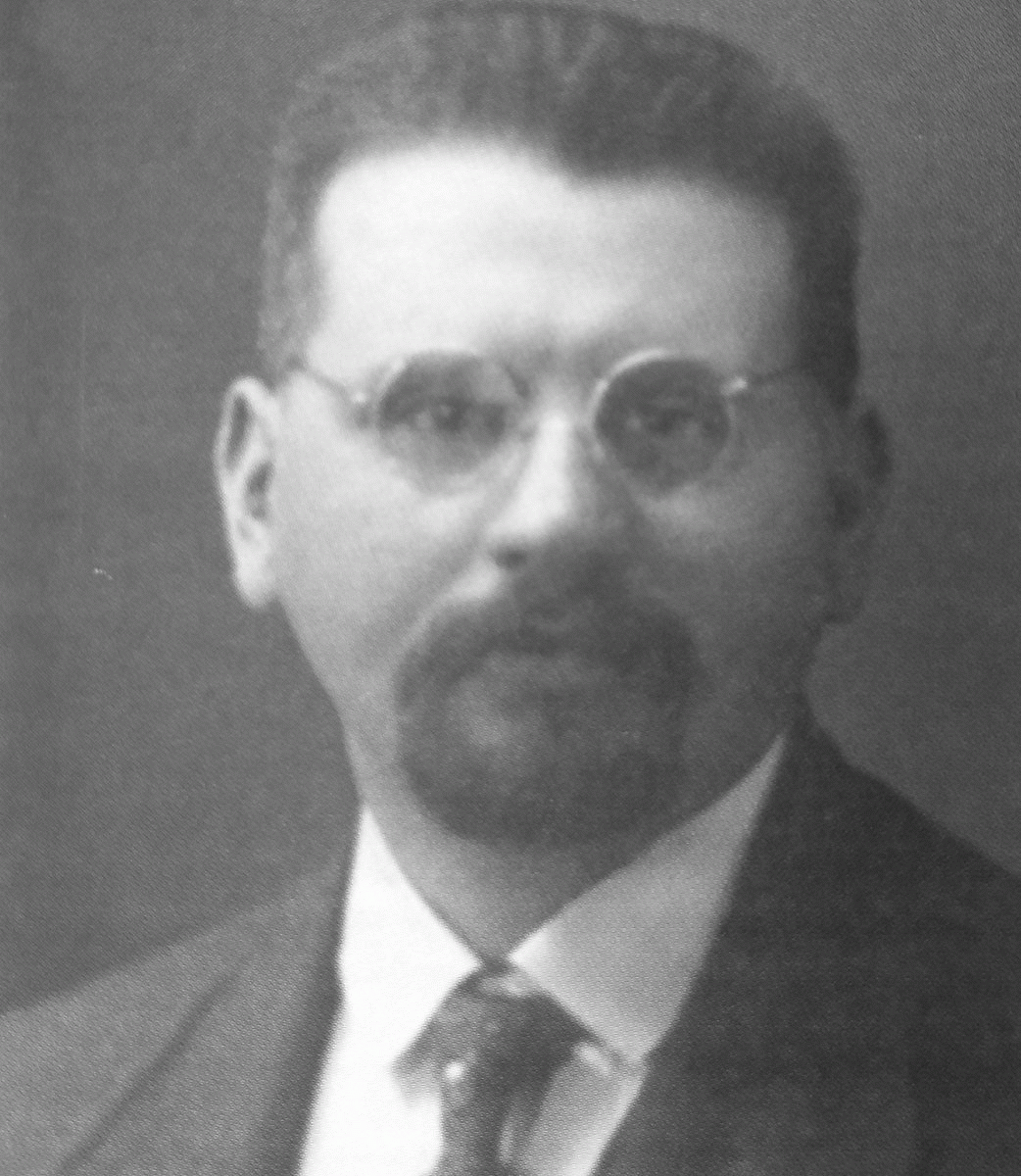
New Martyr Václav Ornest.

== Sources ==
- September 5/September 18. Orthodox Calendar (PRAVOSLAVIE.RU).
- September 18 / September 5. HOLY TRINITY RUSSIAN ORTHODOX CHURCH (A parish of the Patriarchate of Moscow).
- September 5. OCA - The Lives of the Saints.
- The Autonomous Orthodox Metropolia of Western Europe and the Americas (ROCOR). St. Hilarion Calendar of Saints for the year of our Lord 2004. St. Hilarion Press (Austin, TX). p. 66.
- The Fifth Day of the Month of September. Orthodoxy in China.
- September 5. Latin Saints of the Orthodox Patriarchate of Rome.
- The Roman Martyrology. Transl. by the Archbishop of Baltimore. Last Edition, According to the Copy Printed at Rome in 1914. Revised Edition, with the Imprimatur of His Eminence Cardinal Gibbons. Baltimore: John Murphy Company, 1916. pp. 272–273.
- Rev. Richard Stanton. A Menology of England and Wales, or, Brief Memorials of the Ancient British and English Saints Arranged According to the Calendar, Together with the Martyrs of the 16th and 17th Centuries. London: Burns & Oates, 1892. p. 436.

Greek Sources

- Great Synaxaristes: (in Greek) 5 ΣΕΠΤΕΜΒΡΙΟΥ. ΜΕΓΑΣ ΣΥΝΑΞΑΡΙΣΤΗΣ.
- (in Greek) Συναξαριστής. 5 Σεπτεμβρίου. ECCLESIA.GR. (H ΕΚΚΛΗΣΙΑ ΤΗΣ ΕΛΛΑΔΟΣ).
- (in Greek) 05/09/2026. Ορθόδοξος Συναξαριστής.

Russian Sources

- (in Russian) 18 сентября (5 сентября). Православная Энциклопедия под редакцией Патриарха Московского и всея Руси Кирилла (электронная версия). (Orthodox Encyclopedia - Pravenc.ru).
- (in Russian) 5 сентября по старому стилю / 18 сентября по новому стилю. Русская Православная Церковь - Православный церковный календарь на 2026 год.
