= Euphemius of Constantinople =

Patriarch of Constantinople, c. 490–496

- Patriarch of Constantinople
- Installed: c. April 490
- Term ended: c. June 496
- Predecessor: Fravitta of Constantinople
- Successor: Macedonius II of Constantinople

Personal details
- Died: c. 515 Ancyra
- Denomination: Chalcedonian Christianity

Euphemius of Constantinople (Greek: Εὐφήμιος; died c. 515) was patriarch of Constantinople (490–496). Theophanes the Confessor calls him Euthymius. Prior to his appointment, Euphemius was a presbyter of Constantinople, administrator of a hospital for the poor at Neapolis, unsuspected of any Eutychian leanings, and is described as learned and very virtuous.

== Acacian schism ==
In 482, Emperor Zeno had published a decree called the Henotikon, which forbade in the current theological discussions any other criterion but those of the Councils of First Council of Nicaea and First Council of Constantinople (ignoring the decrees of Chalcedon), carefully avoided speaking of Christ's two natures, and used ambiguous formulae that were meant to conciliate the Monophysites. Despite his efforts, the Henotikon really satisfied no one, Monophysites disliked it as much as the Orthodox. However, Acacius of Constantinople at Constantinople, Peter III of Alexandria Patriarch of Alexandria, and Peter the Fuller Patriarch of Antioch had all signed it. Pope Felix III convened in 484 a Roman synod of sixty-seven bishops that condemned the emperor's decree, deposed and excommunicated Acacius, Peter III, and Peter Fuller. Acacius retorted by striking the pope's name from his diptychs and persecuted Catholics at Constantinople. When he died, Fravitta of Constantinople, his successor, applied for recognition at Rome, but in vain, since he would not give up communion with Peter III of Alexandria.

Euphemius immediately recognized the Council of Chalcedon, restored the pope's name to his diptychs, and broke with Peter III of Alexandria, who died in October of the year of Euphemius's accession (490). By these acts, he showed his desire to heal the rift with Rome. Unfortunately, he still refused to erase the names of his two predecessors (Acacius and Fravitta) from the diptychs, where they appeared among the faithful departed. Pope Felix III insisted that heretics and favourers of heresy should not be prayed for publicly; Euphemius repeated his attempts at reconciliation to Pope Gelasius I in 492, but the problem of his predecessors remained; Euphemius could not remove their names from the diptychs without causing embarrassment or insult to those they had baptised and ordained. Gelasius allowed that in other circumstances he would have written to announce his election, but sourly observes that the custom existed only between bishops who were united in communion, and was not to be extended to those who, like Euphemius, preferred a strange alliance to that with Saint Peter. As a mark of condescension Gelasius granted the canonical remedy to all who had been baptised and ordained by Acacius.

Theodoric the Great had become master of Italy, and in 493 sent Faustus and Irenaeus to the emperor Anastasius I Dicorus to ask for peace. During their sojourn at Constantinople the envoys received complaints from the Greeks against the Roman church, which they reported to the pope. Euphemius urged that the condemnation of Acacius by one prelate only was invalid; to excommunicate a metropolitan of Constantinople a general council was necessary.

== Patriarch and Emperor ==
Before the accession of the Emperor Anastasius I Dicorus, Euphemius had made him sign a profession of faith; eventually he fell foul of the emperor. As the Isaurian War was then under way, Euphemius was accused of treason by revealing the emperor's plans to his enemies. A soldier, either by Anastasius's own order or to gain his favour, drew his sword on Euphemius at the door of the sacristy but was struck down by an attendant. The emperor further wanted back his written profession of faith, which Euphemius refused to give up, so Anastasius assembled the bishops who were in the capital and preferred charges against their patriarch, whom they obsequiously excommunicated and deposed (495). The people loyally refused to surrender him but inevitably yielded to the emperor.

Meanwhile, Euphemius, fearing for his life, sought sanctuary in the baptistery, and refused to go out until Macedonius II of Constantinople had promised on the word of the emperor that no violence should be done to him when they conducted him to exile. With a proper feeling of respect for the dignity of his fallen predecessor, Macedonius made the attendant deacon take off the newly-given pallium and clothed himself in the dress of a simple presbyter, "not daring to wear" his insignia before their canonical owner. After some conversation, Macedonius (who would follow Euphemius to the very same place of exile under the same emperor) handed to him the proceeds of a loan he had raised for his expenses. Euphemius was exiled to Asia Minor and died c. 515 at Ancyra. He was recognized to the end as lawful patriarch by his peers in the East who included Elias I of Jerusalem Patriarch of Jerusalem, and Patriarch Flavian II of Antioch.

== Notes and references ==
=== Attribution ===
Titles of Chalcedonian Christianity
Preceded by Fravitta	Patriarch of Constantinople; 489 – 495	Succeeded by Macedonius II
