= Flavia Titiana =

Roman empress in 193

- Augusta
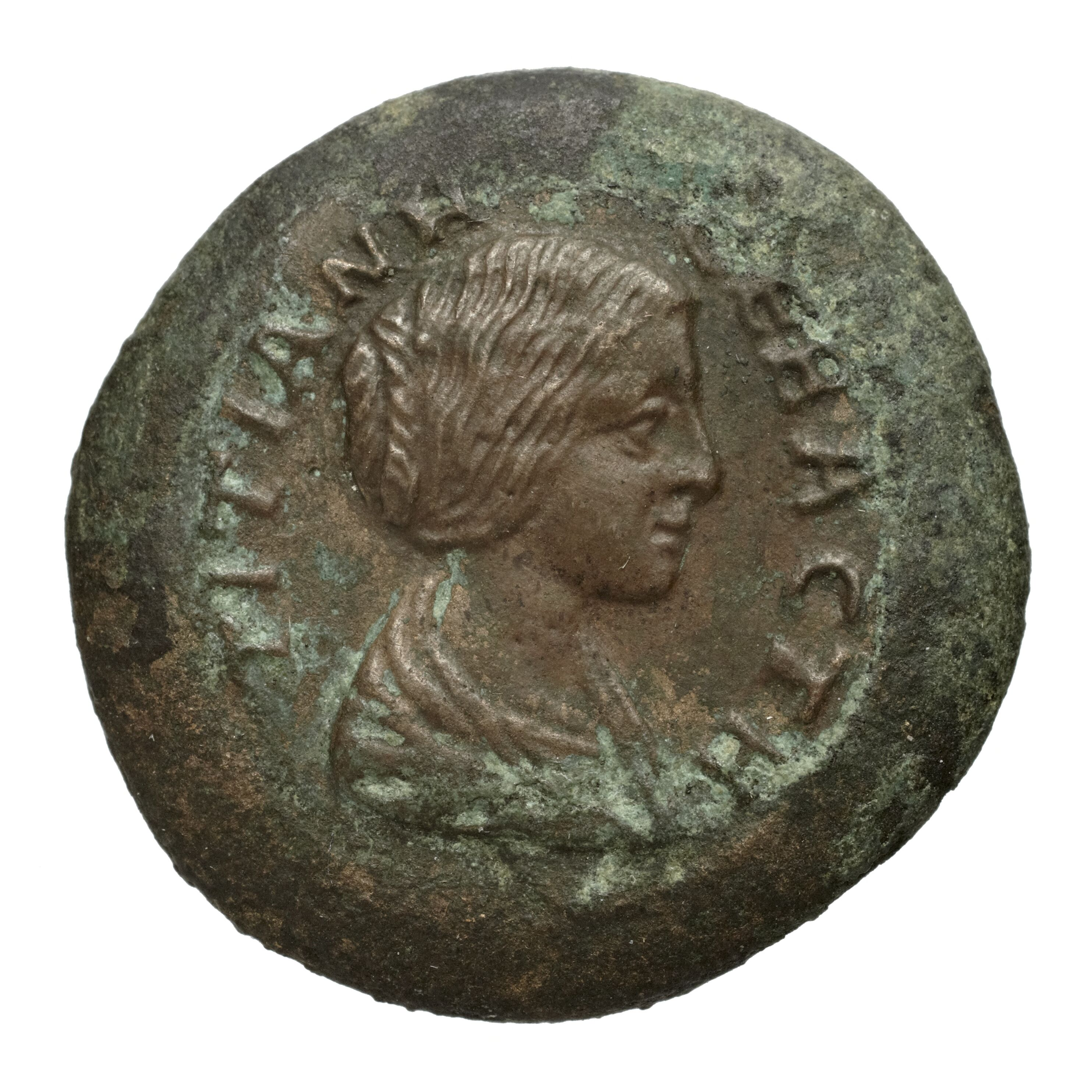

Roman empress
- Tenure: Three months in 193
- Spouse: Pertinax
- Issue: Publius Helvius Pertinax; Helvia
Names
- Flavia Titiana Minor
Regnal name
- Flavia Titiana Augusta
- Father: Titus Flavius Claudius Sulpicianus
- Mother: Flavia Titiana Major

Flavia Titiana was the wife of emperor Pertinax, who ruled briefly in 193 during the Year of the Five Emperors.

== Life ==
Flavia Titiana was the daughter of senator Titus Flavius Claudius Sulpicianus, and sister of Titus Flavius Titianus (b. 165), consul suffectus c. 200. Her maternal grandfather was Titus Flavius Titianus, who was praefectus of Egypt from 126 to 133. Titiana married Publius Helvius Pertinax, a wealthy self-made man who had a successful military and civil career. She bore two children, a boy named Publius Helvius Pertinax and a daughter.

Pertinax was proclaimed emperor after the murder of Commodus on January 1, 193. While the new princeps was offering the customary sacrifice on the Capitoline Hill, the Roman Senate gave Flavia Titiana the honorary title of Augusta. After the murder of Pertinax by the Praetorian Guard on March 28, neither Flavia nor her children were hurt.

The highly unreliable Historia Augusta claims that Flavia Titiana "carried on an amour quite openly with a man who sang to the lyre", but Pertinax was not concerned.

== See also ==
- List of Roman and Byzantine empresses

Royal titles
Preceded by Bruttia Crispina	Empress of Rome; 193	Succeeded by Manlia Scantilla
