= Macedonius II of Constantinople =

Patriarch of Constantinople from 496 to 511

Saint Macedonius II

Patriarch of Constantinople
- Born: 5th century
- Died: c. 517; Gangra, Galatia (modern-day Çankırı, Turkey)
- Venerated in: Eastern Orthodox Church
- Feast: 25 April

Saint Macedonius II
- Patriarch of Constantinople
- Installed: July 496
- Term ended: 11 August 511
- Predecessor: Euphemius of Constantinople
- Successor: Timothy I of Constantinople

Personal details
- Denomination: Chalcedonian Christianity

Macedonius II of Constantinople (Greek: Μακεδόνιος; died c. 517) was patriarch of Constantinople (496–511).

== Biography ==
Within a year or two (the date is uncertain) he assembled a council, in which he confirmed in writing the acts of the Council of Chalcedon. In 507 Elias I of Jerusalem, patriarch of Jerusalem, who had been unwilling to sanction the deposition of Euphemius of Constantinople, united himself in communion with Macedonius. The emperor Anastasius I Dicorus employed all means to oblige Macedonius to declare against the Council of Chalcedon, but flattery and threats were alike unavailing. An assassin named Eucolus was even hired to take away his life. The patriarch avoided the blow and ordered a fixed amount of provisions to be given monthly to the criminal. The people of Constantinople were equally zealous for the council of Chalcedon, even, more than once, to the point of sedition. To prevent unfavourable consequences, Anastasius I ordered the prefect of the city to follow in the processions and attend the assemblies of the church.

In 510 Anastasius I made a new effort. Macedonius II would do nothing without an ecumenical council at which the bishop of Rome should preside. Anastasius I, annoyed at this answer and irritated because Macedonius would never release him from the engagement he had made at his coronation to maintain the faith of the Church and the authority of the council of Chalcedon, sought to drive him from his chair. He sent Eutychian monks and clergy, and sometimes the magistrates of the city, to load him with public outrage and insult. This caused such a tumult amongst the citizens that the emperor was obliged to shut himself up in his palace and to have ships prepared in case flight should be necessary. He sent to Macedonius, asking him to come and speak with him. Macedonius II went and reproached him with the sufferings his persecutions caused the Church. Anastasius I stated his willingness to this, but at the same time made a third attempt to tamper with the beliefs of the patriarch.

One of his instruments was Philoxenus of Mabbug, a Eutychian bishop. He demanded of Macedonius II a declaration of his faith in writing; Macedonius addressed a memorandum to the emperor insisting that he knew no other faith than that of the Fathers of Nicaea and Constantinople and that he anathematised Nestorius and Eutyches and those who admitted two Sons or two Christs, or who divided the two natures. Philoxenus of Mabbug, seeing the failure of his first attempt, found two individuals who accused Macedonius of an abominable crime, avowing themselves his accomplices. They then charged him with Nestorianism, and with having falsified a passage in an epistle of Paul of Tarsus, in support of that sect. At last, the emperor commanded him to send by master of the offices the authentic copy of the Acts of the Council of Chalcedon signed with the autographs of the bishops. Macedonius II refused and hid it under the altar of the great church. Thereupon Anastasius II had him carried off by night and taken to Chalcedon, to be conducted thence to Eucaïta in Pontus, the place of the exile of his predecessor. In 515 Pope Hormisdas worked for the restitution of Macedonius II, whom he considered unjustly deposed; it had been a stipulation in the treaty of peace between the rebel consul Vitalian, a relative of Macedonius, and Emperor Anastasius that the patriarch and all the deposed bishops should be restored to their sees. But Anastasius never kept his promises, and Macedonius II died in exile. His death occurred c. 517, at Gangra, where he had retired for fear of the Huns, who ravaged all Cappadocia, Galatia, and Pontus.

== Notes and references ==
=== Attribution ===
- cites:
  - Evagrius Scholasticus, III, xxxi and xxxii, in ib. 2661;
  - Liberatus of Carthage, vii, in ib. 982;
  - Giovanni Domenico Mansi, viii, 186, 198;
  - Theodoret, Lect. ii, 573–578, in Patrologia Graeca, lxxxvi;
  - Theophanes the Confessor, Chronicle, 120–123, 128, 130, 132;
  - Victor of Tunnuna, Chronicle, in Patrologia Latina, lxviii, 948.

Titles of Chalcedonian Christianity
Preceded by Euphemius	Patriarch of Constantinople; 495 – 511	Succeeded by Timothy I
