= Hieromartyr =

Priest who dies for his beliefs

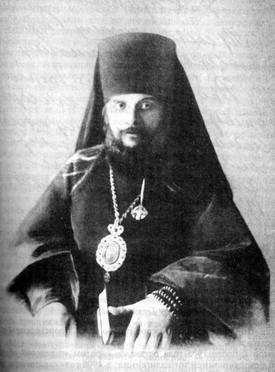
Hieromartyr Hermogen of Tobolsk

In the Eastern Orthodox and Oriental Orthodox tradition, a hieromartyr (Russian: Священномученик) is a martyr (one who dies for his beliefs) who was a bishop or priest.

Hieromartyrs do not constitute a special rank of saint and are commemorated at the Divine Liturgy together with other martyrs. In the Eastern Orthodox Church, at the proskomedia, for them, as for other martyrs, the fifth particle is removed from the nine-part prosphora.

== History ==
Saint Pansophius of Alexandria is an hieromartyr. Clement of Rome, Ignatius of Antioch, and Cyprian are also sometimes labeled as a hieromartyrs.

More hieromartyrs began to appear during the Byzantine Empire. Later, in 1114, Kuksha of the Kiev Caves became a hieromartyr after attempting to preach to the Vyatichi. Eastern Orthodox martyrs killed by the Catholic Church are also labeled hieromartyrs, such as Athanasius of Brest.

Some Russian Orthodox priests killed by the Bolsheviks during the Russian Revolution are also labeled hieromartyrs. This includes the monks of Alexander-Svirsky Monastery.

== Hieromartyrs ==
- Clement of Rome
- Ignatius of Antioch
- Cyprian
- Patriarch Hermogenes of Moscow
- Kuksha of the Kiev Caves
- Athanasius of Brest
- Monks of Alexander-Svirsky Monastery
- Hieromartyrs of Cherson

== See also ==
- New Martyr
- Hosiomartyr
- List of Eastern Orthodox saints
