= Timothy I of Constantinople =

Patriarch of Constantinople from 511 to 518

- Patriarch of Constantinople
- Installed: October 511
- Term ended: 5 April 518
- Predecessor: Macedonius II of Constantinople
- Successor: John of Cappadocia

Personal details
- Died: 5 April 518
- Denomination: Chalcedonian Christianity

Timothy I of Constantinople or Timotheus I (Greek: Τιμόθεος; died 5 April 518) was a Christian priest who was appointed patriarch of Constantinople by the Byzantine emperor Anastasius I Dicorus in 511.

== Early career ==
Timothy was a Christian priest and keeper of the ornaments of the cathedral. Two liturgical innovations are attributed to him, the prayers on Good Friday at the church of the Virgin and the recital of the Nicene Creed at every service, although the last is also ascribed to Peter the Fuller. The British historian F. H. Blackburne Daniel considered him to be a man of bad character, as Timothy allegedly adopted the Non-Chalcedonian doctrines out of ambition rather than conviction.

== Patriarch of Constantinople ==
He sent circular letters to all the bishops, which he requested them to subscribe and assent to the deposition of Macedonius II of Constantinople. Some assented to both, others neither, while others subscribed to the letters but refused to assent to the deposition. Certain Non-Chalcedonians, such as Pope John II (III) of Alexandria, patriarch of Alexandria, whose name he had inserted in the diptychs, at first stood aloof from him, because, though he accepted the Henotikon, he did not reject the Council of Chalcedon, and for the same reason Flavian II of Antioch and Elias I of Jerusalem at first communicated with him. Timothy was appointed patriarch of Constantinople by the Roman Emperor Anastasius I Dicorus in 511, the day after Macedonius II was deposed as patriarch.

When Severus of Antioch became patriarch of Antioch, he assembled a synod which condemned that council, after which act Severus communicated with him. Timothy I sent the decrees of his synod to Jerusalem, where Elias refused to receive them. Timothy I then incited Anastasius I to depose him. He also induced the emperor to persecute the clergy, monks, and laity who adhered to Macedonius II, many of whom were banished to the Oasis in the Thebaid. His emissaries to Alexandria anathematised from the pulpit the council of Chalcedon. Within a year of his accession Timothy I directed that the Ter Sanctus should be recited with the addition of "Who was crucified for us", which led to disturbances in two churches, in which many were slain over 4 and 5 November, and to a terrible riot the following day which nearly caused the deposition of the Emperor Anastasius I.

Timothy I died on 5 April 518.

== Notes and references ==
=== Attribution ===
- cites:
  - Victor of Tunnuna, Chronicle;
  - Marcellinus Comes, Chronicle;
  - Theodoret, Orations, ii, 28, 29, 30, 32, 33;
  - Evagrius Scholasticus, iii, 33;
  - Theophanes the Confessor, Chronicle;
  - Louis-Sébastien Le Nain de Tillemont, Mém. eccl., xvi, 691, 698, 728.

Titles of Chalcedonian Christianity
Preceded by Macedonius II	Patriarch of Constantinople; 511 – 518	Succeeded by John of Cappadocia
