= Titus Flavius Titianus (consul) =

Early third century Roman consul and governor of Alexandria

Titus Flavius Titianus was Procurator of Alexandria during the reign of Caracalla. He was put to death by Theocritus, the favourite of Caracalla, about AD 216. He is probably the same Titus Flavius Titianus who was consul suffectus about 200; that Titianus was the son of Titus Flavius Claudius Sulpicianus, and brother of Flavia Titiana, the wife of the emperor Pertinax. Titianus was married to Postumia Varia.

== See also ==
- Flavia gens – Roman families

== Bibliography ==
- Lucius Cassius Dio, Roman History.
- Dictionary of Greek and Roman Biography and Mythology, William Smith, ed., Little, Brown and Company, Boston (1849).
- Inge Mennen, Power and Status in the Roman Empire, AD 193–284, Brill (2011).
