= Athanasius of Brest =

Orthodox Christian saint and hieromartyr (died 1648)

Saint Athanasius of Brest
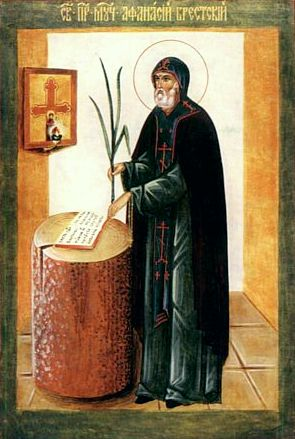

Hieromartyr, Abbot
- Born: 1597
- Died: 1648; Brest
- Venerated in: Eastern Orthodox Church
- Feast: September 5

Athanasius of Brest (Russian: Афанасий Брестский, Belarusian: Афанасій Брэсцкі) (died September 5, 1648) is a saint and hieromartyr of the Russian Orthodox Church and the Polish Orthodox Church. He was killed by Catholics for opposition to the Union of Brest. Athanasius is commemorated on September 5 by the Eastern Orthodox Church.

== Biography ==
Athanasius Filipovich was born to a petty Lithuanian nobleman, in 1597, according to Orthodox Christian tradition, in Brest, then part of the Polish–Lithuanian Commonwealth. As a well-educated man in modern and ancient languages, the writings of the Church Fathers, and the works of Western philosophers and theologians, Athanasius worked for several years as a private tutor. In 1627 he entered the Monastery of the Holy Spirit in Vilnius. He later moved to other monasteries and was ordained a priest. In 1637, he transferred to the Monastery of Kupyatitsk near Minsk. He was sent to collect donations for the restoration of the church. The journey was accompanied by visions, miraculous signs, and physical dangers.

In 1640, Athanasius became hegumen of the Monastery of St Simeon Stylites in Brest. From then on, he advocated against Roman proselytism and the Union of Brest. In 1643, he spoke before the Polish sejm (parliament) in favor of Orthodoxy and against the Union. He was proclaimed insane, arrested, and stripped of his monastic titles. Athanasius was then sent to Peter Mogila, Metropolitan of Kiev, who sent him back to Brest. That did not stop his protests and Athanasius was arrested again in 1644, but was released a year later. The Khmelnytsky Uprising among the Ukrainian Cossacks started in 1648. Athanasius was accused of ties with the rebels. He was arrested, tortured, and executed. His remains were found on July 20, 1649 – the day is sometimes commemorated as an alternative feast day.

== Veneration ==
While his feast day is celebrated on September 5th, the uncovering of his relics was on July 20th, 1679. His martyrdom is commemorated on the former and the uncovering of his relics on the latter.

Similar to Josaphat Kuntsevych, Athanasius of Brest is not venerated in the denomination of his persecutors.
