= Athyras =

Ancient city

Coordinates: 41°02′02″N 28°35′24″E

Athyras (Ancient Greek: Ἀθύρας) was a Greek city in ancient Thrace, located in the region of the Propontis.

Its site has been located near the modern Turkish city of Büyükçekmece.

Under the name Athyra, it is a titular see of both the Eastern Orthodox Church and Roman Catholic Church.

== See also ==
- Greek colonies in Thrace
