= Titus Flavius Claudius Sulpicianus =

Roman senator and consul (c.137–197)

Titus Flavius Claudius Sulpicianus (ca. 137 AD – 197 AD) was a Roman statesman who served as Senator and Consul suffectus. He unsuccessfully attempted to succeed his son-in-law Pertinax as Emperor in 193.

== Early life ==
Sulpicianus was probably born in the Cretan town of Hierapytna, around the year 137. He married the daughter of Titus Flavius Titianus, who was the equestrian Prefect of Egypt under Hadrian.

== Career ==
Sulpicianus’ early career is unknown, but around 170 he was appointed suffect consul. Sometime during the 170s he was admitted into the Arval Brethren. In 186 he was appointed the proconsular governor of Asia. He may have had some involvement in the assassination of emperor Commodus at the end of 192, and for the first three months of 193 he served as Praefectus urbi of Rome as a result of his marital ties to the incoming emperor Pertinax, who had married his daughter Flavia Titiana.

== Attempted emperorship ==
The aftermath of Pertinax's murder saw Sulpicianus trying to quell a disturbance among the Praetorian Guard. Hearing of Pertinax's death, he was offered the imperial title and he turned to the Praetorians to gain their approval. He proceeded to offer each soldier 20,000 sesterces, or eight years worth of wages, the same amount offered by Marcus Aurelius in 161. Unfortunately, a fellow senator, Didius Julianus, appeared and outbid Sulpicianus, thereby winning their support. Julianus was saluted as imperator by the Praetorians, and the new emperor proceeded to pardon his rival, retaining Sulpicianus as the urban prefect.

== Death ==
Sulpicianus survived Julianus’ death and the arrival of the new emperor Septimius Severus. However, possibly due to his having supported the rival imperial claimant Clodius Albinus, Sulpicianus was prosecuted and executed in 197.

== Family ==
Sulpicianus had at least two children; a son, Titus Flavius Titianus, who was suffect consul ca. 200, and a daughter, Flavia Titiana, who was married to the emperor Pertinax. He also had a number of estates around Praeneste.
