= Elias I of Jerusalem =

Patriarch of Jerusalem

Saint Elias I of Jerusalem

Patriarch of Jerusalem
- Born: unknown
- Died: c. 518
- Venerated in: Eastern Orthodox Church; Catholic Church
- Feast: 20 July (Eastern Orthodox Church), 4 July (Catholic Church)
- Attributes: Bishop

Elias of Jerusalem (d. c. 518) was a bishop and Patriarch of Jerusalem from 494 until he was deposed by Byzantine Emperor Anastasius I in 516 for supporting the decrees of the Council of Chalcedon. Elias was an Arab, by birth, who had been educated in a monastery in Egypt. At the Synod of Sidon (512) he successfully defended, together with Flavian II of Antioch, the dyophysite Christological doctrine proclaimed by the Council of Chalcedon. Elias, together with Flavian II of Antioch, is commemorated on July 20 in the Eastern Orthodox Church and July 4 in the Roman Martyrology.

== See also ==
- Patriarch Euphemius of Constantinople
- Patriarch Timothy I of Constantinople

Religious titles
| Preceded by Sallustius | Patriarch of Jerusalem; 494-516 | Succeeded by John III |
