= Marcus Flavius =

Marcus Flavius was Tribune of the Plebs in 327 and again in 323 BC.

In 329 BC, Flavius was accused of seducing married women by the aedile, Gaius Valerius Potitus (consul 331 BC). While at first he was found guilty, Flavius pleaded that an innocent man was being ruined to which Valerius replied that he did not care whether or not he had ruined an innocent man or a guilty one, so long as Flavius was being ruined. Because of this remark, Flavius won the trial.

In 328 BC, Flavius made a distribution of meat to the people on occasion of the funeral of his mother. The gift of meat won him the election of Tribune of the Plebs in 327, despite the fact that he was absent for the election. The gift of meat could not only have been to honor his mother, but also to show gratitude to the people of Rome who had acquitted him in the trial where he had been charged with adultery.

In 323 BC, Flavius brought the Tusculans to trial before the people for advising and assisting the people of Velitrae and Privernum in their rebellion against Rome during the Latin revolt (340-338 BC). According to Livy and Valerius Maximus, several Tusculan families arrived at Rome poorly dressed and were nearly forgiven by all tribes. One tribe, the Pollia, insisted that the men be beaten and executed and that the women and children be auctioned off. Because of this, when the Tusculans gained Roman citizenship the Papiria tribe, which they dominated, would never elect a member of the Pollia to public office. However, the Tusculans had been citizens of Rome since 338 BC.
