= Fravitta of Constantinople =

Patriarch of Constantinople from 488 to 489

- Patriarch of Constantinople
- Installed: December 488
- Term ended: March 489
- Predecessor: Acacius of Constantinople
- Successor: Euphemius of Constantinople

Personal details
- Died: 490
- Denomination: Chalcedonian Christianity

Fravitta of Constantinople (Greek: Φραβίτας, Fravitas; d. 490), also known as Fravitas, Flavitas, or Flavianus II, was the patriarch of Constantinople (488–489).

According to Nikephoros Kallistos Xanthopoulos, on the death of Patriarch Acacius of Constantinople, the emperor Zeno placed on the altar of the great Church of Constantinople two sheets of paper. On one was written a prayer that God would send an angel to inscribe on the blank sheet the name of him whom He wished to be the patriarch. A fast of 40 days with prayer was ordered. The church was given into the custody of a confidential eunuch, the imperial chamberlain, and the imperial seal set on the casket containing the papers.

Fravitta was a presbyter in charge of the suburban church of Saint Thecla. Fueled with ambition, he paid the eunuch large sums, and promised him more, to write his name on the blank sheet. At the end of the 40 days the casket was opened; the name of Fravitta was found, and he was enthroned amid universal acclamations. Within 4 months he died, and the powerful eunuch was pressing his executors for the promised gold. They revealed the odious tale to the emperor. The forger was turned out of all his employments and driven from the city. The emperor Zeno, ashamed of his failure, entrusted the election of the new patriarch to the clergy. However, the correspondence between Zeno, Fravitta, and Pope Felix III on the appointment show no trace of this story.

Fravitta simultaneously wrote letters to Peter III of Alexandria asking for his communion, and a synodal to Pope Felix III of Rome for his sanction and co-operation. The synodal was carried to Rome by monks of Constantinople who had always kept separate from Acacius and his friend Peter III. An accompanying letter of Zeno showed great affection for Fravitta; Zeno had only worked for his appointment because he thought him worthy and to restore peace and unity to the churches. Pope Felix III, delighted with the letters, had Zeno's read aloud to the deputation and all the clergy of Rome, who expressed loud approval.

When the Pope, however, wished the monks from Constantinople to undertake that the names of Acacius and Peter III should be rejected from the diptychs, they replied that they had no instructions on that point. The joy of the Pope was destroyed by the arrival at Rome of a copy of the letter which Fravitta had sent to Peter III, denying all communion with Rome. The Pope would not hear a word more from the monks. Whether the story of Nikephoros Kallistos Xanthopoulos be true or not, Fravitta stands disgraced by this duplicity.

== Notes and references ==
=== Attribution ===
- Sinclair cites:
  - Evagrius Scholasticus, iii, 23, Patrologia Graeca, lxxxvi, part ii;
  - Felicis Pap. Ep., xii and xiii, Patrologia Latina, lviii, p. 971;
  - Joann, Zonar; Annal. xiv, iii, Patrologia Graeca, cxxxiv, § 53, p. 1214;
  - Liberat. Diac. Brev., xviii, Patrologia Latina, lxviii;
  - Nikephoros Kallistos Xanthopoulos, xvi, 19, Patrologia Graeca, cxlvii, § 684, p. 152;
  - Theophanes the Confessor, Chronogr. 114, Patrologia Graeca, cviii, p. 324.

Titles of Chalcedonian Christianity
Preceded by Acacius	Patriarch of Constantinople; 489 – 490	Succeeded by Euphemius
