= Flavian II of Antioch =

Patriarch of Antioch from 498 to 512

Saint Flavian II of Antioch
- Patriarch of Antioch
- Church: Church of Antioch
- See: Antioch
- Installed: 498
- Term ended: 512
- Predecessor: Palladius of Antioch
- Successor: Severus of Antioch

Personal details
- Died: 518
- Denomination: Chalcedonian Christianity

Flavian II of Antioch (Latin: Flavianus II; Ancient Greek: Φλαβιανός Βʹ Ἀντιοχείας, Phlabianós II Antiokheías) was the Patriarch of Antioch from 498 until his deposition and subsequent banishment in 512.

== Biography ==
Flavian was a Monk under the Rule of St. Basil at the Monastery of Tilmognon and later became an apocrisiarius. After the death of Patriarch Palladius in 498, Flavian was appointed by Emperor Anastasius I as Patriarch of Antioch on the condition that he accepted the Henotikon. However, during his reign as patriarch, Flavian II did not show any opposition to Chalcedonian Christianity.

As patriarch, Flavian II and Patriarch Elias I of Jerusalem, resisted the attempts to abolish the Council of Chalcedon. However, due to the conflict between Chalcedonians and non-Chalcedonians in Antioch, Flavian II endeavoured to please both parties by steering a middle course in reference to the Chalcedonian decrees, yet was forced by Anastasius to sign the Henotikon in 508/509. Furthermore, Flavian II was accused of Nestorianism by Philoxenus of Mabbug, bishop of Hierapolis.

In 511, Philoxenus convinced Miaphysites of the surrounding Syrian countryside to storm Antioch and force Flavian II to condemn the Council of Chalcedon but was met by fierce Chalcedonians who slaughtered the attackers and dumped their bodies into the River Orontes. The monks of Flavian II's former monastery journeyed to Antioch to defend Flavian II against the anti-Chalcedonians. These events drove Anastasius to adopt a Miaphysite ecclesiastical programme and thus Flavian II and Elias I lost imperial support.

A synod was convened in Sidon in 512 by Philoxenus and eighty other non-Chalcedonian bishops, with the support of Anastasius, to condemn Flavian II and Elias I and as a result he was deposed and banished to Petra, where he died in 518. Flavian II's deposition and subsequent resentment towards Anastasius caused Vitalian's rebellion in 513. Flavian II was soon posthumously enrolled among the saints of the Eastern Church, and after some opposition, in the Western Church as well. He is commemorated in the Eastern Orthodox Church along with Elias I of Jerusalem on July 20.

== Bibliography ==
- Meyendorff, John (1989). Imperial unity and Christian divisions - The Church 450-680 A.D. The Church in history. Vol. 2. Crestwood, NY: St. Vladimir's Seminary Press. ISBN 9780881410563.

Titles of Chalcedonian Christianity
Preceded by Palladius	Patriarch of Antioch; 498 – 512	Succeeded by Severus
