= Bazaar of Heracleides =

5th-century work by Nestorius of Constantinople

- Cambridge University Library
- Type: Codex
- Date: 451
- Place of origin: White Monastery
- Scribe: Prelates of the Church of the East
- Author: Nestorius of Constantinople
- Condition: Slightly damaged; missing pages
- Contents: Nestorius’s defense of his two-nature Christology and claim of vindication at Chalcedon

The Bazaar of Heracleides (Syriac: ܬܰܓܘܼܪܬܳܐ ܕܗܰܪܰܩܠܝܼܕܶܣ) is a theological and historical apologetic work attributed to Nestorius, the 5th-century Patriarch of Constantinople. Composed in 451 or 452, the work survives only in a Syriac translation and constitutes one of the most significant surviving texts authored by Nestorius, whose writings were largely destroyed following his condemnation at the Council of Ephesus of 431.

The work was preserved for centuries in a Church of the East monastery in Qudshanis, Hakkari, and despite suffering significant damage during the massacre of Assyrian Christians by Bedir Khan Beg, it was later rediscovered in the 19th century. Its publication and study renewed scholarly interest in the Christological controversies of late antiquity and provided fresh evidence for reassessing Nestorius's life, thought, and the historical circumstances surrounding his condemnation.

== Authorship and composition ==
According to Socrates, Nestorius was banished to Egypt despite an imperial decree exiling him to Arabia. It was during this later period of his life, in or shortly after 451, that he composed the Bazaar. Specifically, he was placed under house arrest under Shenoute the Archimandrite, a staunch Miaphysite and presider at the Council of Ephesus, at the White Monastery in Upper Egypt.

The surviving Syriac manuscript gives the work the title:

"The Book Which Is Called the Bazaar of Heracleides of Damascus Which Was Composed by My Lord Nestorius"

It concludes with the statement:

"Finished is the writing of the book which is entitled the Bazaar of Heracleides, composed by [him who is] illustrious among the saints and all-blessed, my lord Nestorius, bishop of Constantinople, a witness every day and the pride of orthodoxy, a true preacher of the glorious Trinity. And unto Yahweh [be] unfailing glory. Amen."

== Transmission and manuscripts ==
The only known copy of the Bazaar was long preserved in a Church of the East monastery in Hakkari until the Assyrian genocide. It is mentioned by Evagrius Scholasticus as the "book of Nestorius," which he claimed contained both a "defence of his blasphemy" and an account of his life after condemnation. Ebed Jesu, a 14th-century Church of the East theologian, also lists the manuscript among Nestorius's works.

James Franklin Bethune-Baker proposed that the Syriac translation originated when a Nestorian bishop, a certain Maraba (Mar Awa) — possibly sent westward on Persian orders to evangelize, as it was common of the time — visited Egypt, which he described as "the real home of Monophysites" meaning Miaphysites, and specifically referring to the Coptic Orthodox Church. Finding the original Greek manuscript there, the bishop brought it back east and had it translated into Syriac. The preface of the work contains the phrase "Egyptian error," despite Armenia and Syria also being predominantly Miaphysite, supporting the theory of an Egyptian origin. In Egypt, he found the an identical copy of the original in Greek and brought the book back with him to the East, setting one of his chaplains to translate it. Attached to this work was a collection of various letters and homilies from across the late antiquity Christian era, titled "Fragments".

The title itself is a mistranslation. Paul Bedjan notes that the original Greek word was likely πραγματεία (pragmateía) meaning "treatise" or "business", rendered in Syriac as te'gûrtâ ("merchandise"). The name Heracleides, stylized "Heracleides of Damascus", is a made-up pseudonym by Nestorius. The translator to Syriac has prefixed a preface in which he gives the reason why the book was published under such a title: it was done "lest since his own name was a bugbear to many, they should be unwilling to read it and be converted to the truth." Nonetheless, little attempt is made within the book to mask its actual author, and the pseudonym itself may have been a post-hoc invention by his supporters to save it from destruction.

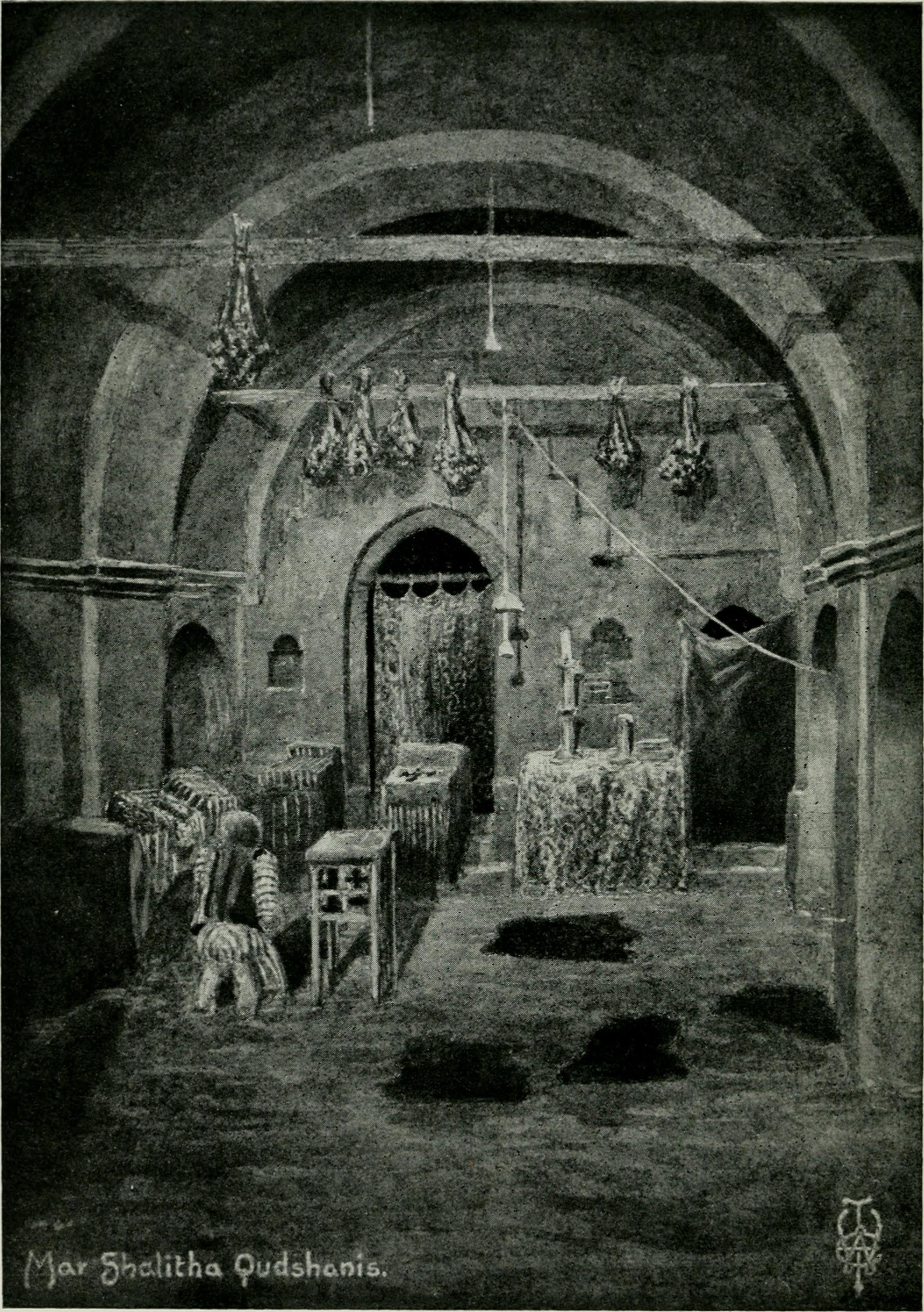
A drawing of the Church of Mar Shalitha, Qudshanis, Hakkari Province, Turkey. It was the seat of the Patriarch of the Church of the East until it was relocated to Chicago following Seyfo

=== Condition of the manuscript ===
The manuscript suffered extensive damage during the 1843 massacre of Assyrians by the Kurdish chief Bedr Khan Bey, resulting in the loss of 133 pages, or about one-sixth of the whole book. Some additional damage occurred over time. The missing sections are believed to be doctrinally unimportant. In later repairs, the first two books were mistakenly swapped out of order.

The translation is acknowledged to be somewhat inaccurate, though generally aimed at conveying the sense rather than a word-for-word rendering. Many errors can be corrected through comparison with standard Greek–Syriac translation practices in scripture and patristics, while others remain unexplained.

=== Modern rediscovery ===
For centuries, the work was known only through a mutilated manuscript preserved in Qudshanis, the seat of the Patriarch of the Church of the East. Two additional copies surfaced in the 19th century: one in Urmia, obtained by American missionaries, from which further copies were made for Cambridge and Strasbourg.

The rediscovery of the Bazaar reignited scholarly and ecclesiastical interest in the Christological controversies of late antiquity, offering a direct window into Nestorius's own thoughts.

== Structure and content ==
The Bazaar combines historical autobiography with theological argumentation. Nestorius defends himself against the charges made at the Council of Ephesus, asserting that his deposition was unjust and that the later vindication of Flavian of Constantinople, "who suffered for the same faith," confirms his position. He laments that he "never had a fair hearing, but was condemned untried defending the faith which was ultimately accepted by the Church."

While critical of his personal treatment, Nestorius emphasized that defending the truth was more important than personal vindication.

=== Content overview ===
The work opens with a dialogue with a certain "Sophronius" (a fictional character used as a literary device) addressing various heresies — paganism, Manichaeism, Arianism, Sabellianism, among others — and explicitly denies having taught "Two Sons" in Christ. Later sections recount his theological disputes with Cyril of Alexandria, defending his own views through scripture, the Nicene Creed, and patristic sources, and arguing that Cyril's position was self-contradictory and akin to earlier heresies.

From the Bazaar, Leonard Hodgson makes the following points clear, with special attention given to the eighth point:

1. He denies that the unity of Christ is a "natural composition" in which two elements are combined by the will of some external "creator."
2. He denies that the Incarnation was effected by changing godhead into manhood or vice versa, or by forming a tertium quid from those two ousiai.
3. He denies that God was in Christ in the same way as in the saints.
4. He denies that either the godhead or the manhood of Christ are "fictitious" or "phantasmal," and not real.
5. He denies that the Incarnation involved any change in the godhead, or any suffering on the part of the Divine Logos who, as divine, is by nature impassible.
6. He denies that the union of two natures in one Christ involves any duality of sonship.
7. He asserts that the union is a voluntary union of godhead and manhood.
8. He asserts that the principle of union is to be found in the prosopa of the godhead and the manhood, these two prosopa coalesced in one prosopon of Christ incarnate.
9. He asserts that this view alone provides for a real Incarnation, makes possible faith in a real atonement, and provides a rationale of the sacramentalism of the Church.

== Contemporary reinterpretation ==
The rediscovery of the Bazaar of Heracleides brought a significant revival of interest in the Christological controversies of late antiquity, particularly concerning the theology of Nestorius. Before its recovery, almost all of Nestorius's writings had been lost, with the exception of fragments preserved in the polemical works of his adversaries and a handful of letters transmitted in Latin by Marius Mercator. These surviving materials were limited in both scope and depth, offering only a narrow and often hostile view of his thought. In contrast, the Bazaar overshadows these completely in volume and content, providing a fresh perspective of his own defense, beliefs, and self-perception. Its emergence allowed for a more balanced reassessment of one of the most vilified figures in Christian history. This also enabled a more accurate dating of his death than previously believed; while it was assumed to have occurred on the eve of the Council of Chalcedon, evidence from the Bazaar indicates that it actually took place much later.

The work shows that Nestorius remained steadfast not only in his conviction of his own orthodoxy but also in his belief that he had been mistreated and politically outmaneuvered at the Council of Ephesus and in its aftermath. He famously summarized the council as "Ephesus is Cyril," reducing it to the dominance of his Alexandrian rival. The Bazaar records his sense of betrayal by members of the School of Antioch — including mentors, former students, and friends — who distanced themselves from him, and in some cases anathematized him. Yet, despite this sense of abandonment, he expressed satisfaction that the Christological position he defended ultimately triumphed through the advocacy of Pope Leo I and Flavian of Constantinople at Chalcedon, as well as through the later deposition of Cyril's successor (Pope Dioscorus I of Alexandria) and his Alexandrian synod.

Repeatedly, Nestorius lauds Leo and Flavian, calling them his "children" and "champions of truth." He believed that the Council of Chalcedon had vindicated his teaching, even though it simultaneously upheld his condemnation — an inconsistency to which he responded with indifference, remarking of himself: "But as for Nestorius, let him be anathema." He refrained from writing directly to Leo to express his joy at the council's outcome, explaining that public knowledge of his approval might compromise the faith; for him, the unity and integrity of the Church's confession were worth the personal sacrifice of remaining publicly disgraced. He recounts the pleasure he felt upon hearing that the Church of Rome, which under Pope Celestine had condemned him, now stood with Leo on the side of a "true confession." To Nestorius, the eventual dominance of the dyophysite theology of the Antiochene school was proof that his own position had prevailed, even if his reputation had been sacrificed to "save the face of the Alexandrians."

While this information may have been known from other sources, the Bazaar further confirmed that Nestorius did not advocate for a two-person Christology; instead, he supported a two-nature (Greek: hypostasis) Christology. He was aware of such concepts at the time, including the accusations leveled against him, which he regarded as "absurd" and "entirely incompatible with scripture." Nestorius did not perceive two distinct persons joined together but rather a single Person who encompassed both the divine and human substances, each with their complete and intact characteristics, united within Him.

== See also ==
- Nestorianism
- Eutychianism
- Anti-Assyrian sentiment
- Nestorian cross
