= Chalcedonian Christianity =

Branch of Christianity that accepts the Council of Chalcedon

Chalcedonian Christianity is the branch of Christianity that accepts and upholds theological resolutions of the Council of Chalcedon, the fourth ecumenical council, held in AD 451. Chalcedonian Christianity accepts the Christological Definition of Chalcedon, a Christian doctrine concerning the union of two natures (divine and human) in one hypostasis of Jesus Christ, who is thus acknowledged as a single person (prosopon). Chalcedonian Christianity also accepts the Chalcedonian confirmation of the Niceno-Constantinopolitan Creed, thus acknowledging the commitment of Chalcedonism to Nicene Christianity.

Chalcedonian Christology is upheld by Roman Catholicism, Eastern Orthodoxy, Lutheranism, Anglicanism and Calvinism, thus comprising the overwhelming majority of Christianity.

== Chalcedonian Christology ==
Those present at the Council of Chalcedon accepted Trinitarianism and the concept of hypostatic union, and rejected Arianism, Modalism, and Ebionism as heresies (which had also been rejected at the First Council of Nicaea in AD 325). Those present at the council also rejected the Christological doctrines of the Nestorians, Eutychians, and Monophysites.

The Chalcedonian doctrine of the Hypostatic Union states that Jesus Christ has two natures, divine and human, possessing a complete human nature while remaining one divine hypostasis. It asserts that the natures are unmixed and unconfused, with the human nature of Christ being assumed at the incarnation without any change to the divine nature. It also states that while Jesus Christ has assumed a true human nature, body and soul, which shall remain hypostatically united to his divine nature for all of eternity, he is nevertheless not a human person, as human personhood would imply a second created hypostasis existing within Jesus Christ and violating the unity of the God-man.

The Hypostatic Union was also viewed as one nature in Roman Christianity by a minority around this time. Single-nature ideas such as Apollinarism and Eutychianism were taught to explain some of the seeming contradictions in Chalcedonian Christianity.

(Not shown are ante-Nicene, nontrinitarian, and restorationist denominations.)

== Sources ==
- Athanasopoulos, Constantinos; Schneider, Christoph, eds. (2013). Divine Essence and Divine Energies: Ecumenical Reflections on the Presence of God. Cambridge, UK: James Clarke & Co. ISBN 9780227900086.
- Kharlamov, Vladimir (2009). The Beauty of the Unity and the Harmony of the Whole: The Concept of Theosis in the Theology of Pseudo-Dionysius the Areopagite. Eugene: Wipf and Stock Publishers. ISBN 9781606081648.
- Chesnut, Roberta C. (1978). "The Two Prosopa in Nestorius' Bazaar of Heracleides". The Journal of Theological Studies. 29 (2): 392–409. doi:10.1093/jts/XXIX.2.392.
- González, Justo L. (2005). Essential Theological Terms. Louisville: Westminster John Knox Press. ISBN 9780664228101.
- Florovsky, Georges (1987). The Eastern Fathers of the Fourth Century. Vaduz: Büchervertriebsanstalt. ISBN 9783905238075.
- Grillmeier, Aloys (1975) [1965]. Christ in Christian Tradition: From the Apostolic Age to Chalcedon (451) (2nd revised ed.). Louisville: Westminster John Knox Press. ISBN 9780664223014.
- Kelly, John N. D. (2006) [1972]. Early Christian Creeds (3rd ed.). London-New York: Continuum. ISBN 9780826492166.
- Loon, Hans van (2009). The Dyophysite Christology of Cyril of Alexandria. Leiden-Boston: Brill. ISBN 978-9004173224.
- Menze, Volker L. (2008). Justinian and the Making of the Syrian Orthodox Church. Oxford: Oxford University Press. ISBN 978-0-19-953487-6.
- Meyendorff, John (1966). Orthodoxy and Catholicity. New York: Sheed & Ward.
- Meyendorff, John (1989). Imperial Unity and Christian Divisions: The Church 450–680 A.D. Crestwood, NY: St. Vladimir's Seminary Press. ISBN 9780881410563.
- Nichols, Aidan (2010) [1992]. Rome and the Eastern Churches: A Study in Schism (2nd revised ed.). San Francisco: Ignatius Press. ISBN 9781586172824.
- Norris, Richard A., ed. (1980). The Christological Controversy. Minneapolis: Fortess Press. ISBN 9780800614119.
- Ostrogorsky, George (1956). History of the Byzantine State. Oxford: Basil Blackwell.
- Pásztori-Kupán, István (2006). Theodoret of Cyrus. London & New York: Routledge. ISBN 9781134391769.

== See also ==
- Non-Chalcedonian Christianity
