= Dyophysitism =

Christological position

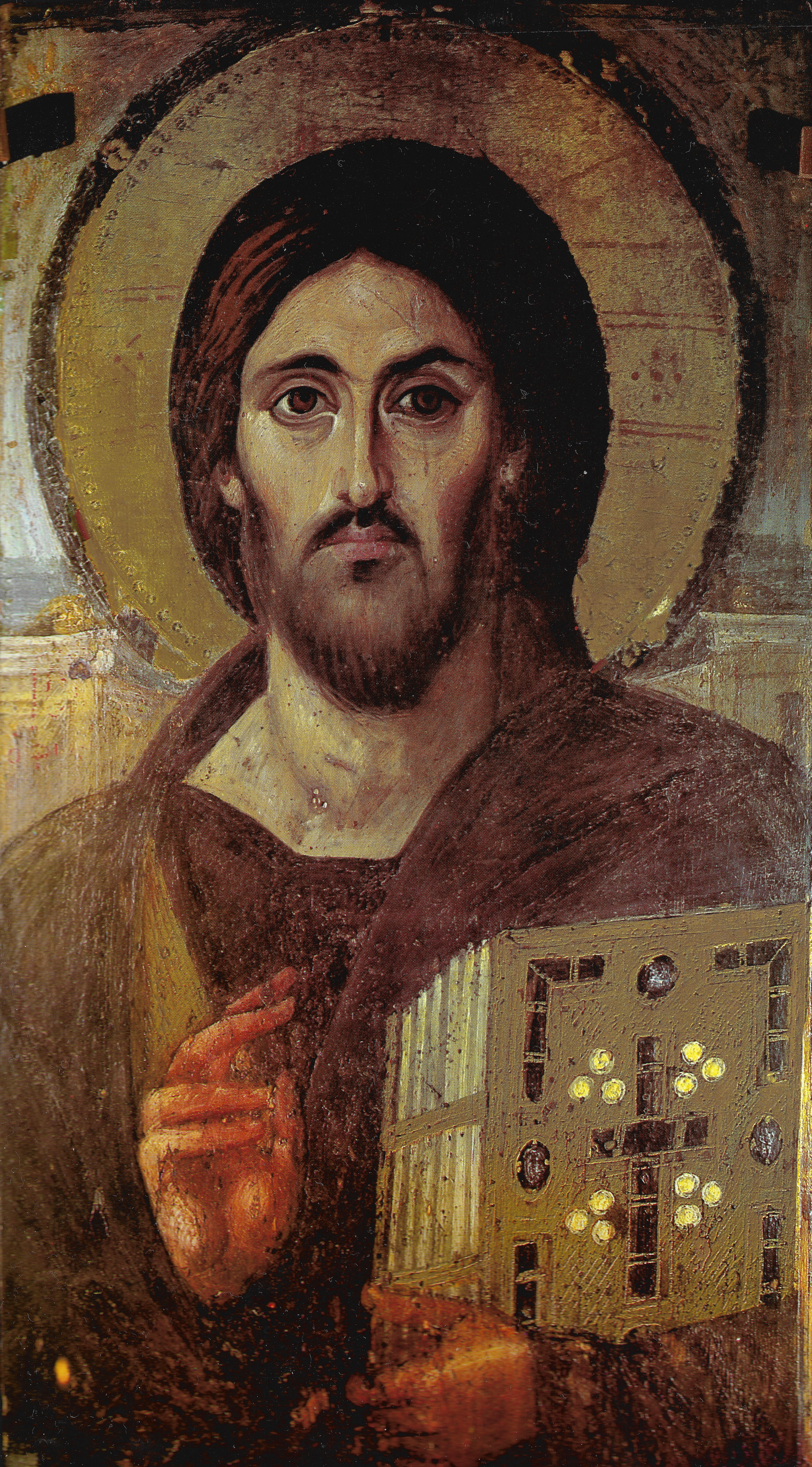
Icon of Christ the Pantocrator. The icon represents the dual nature of Christ, illustrating traits of both man and God

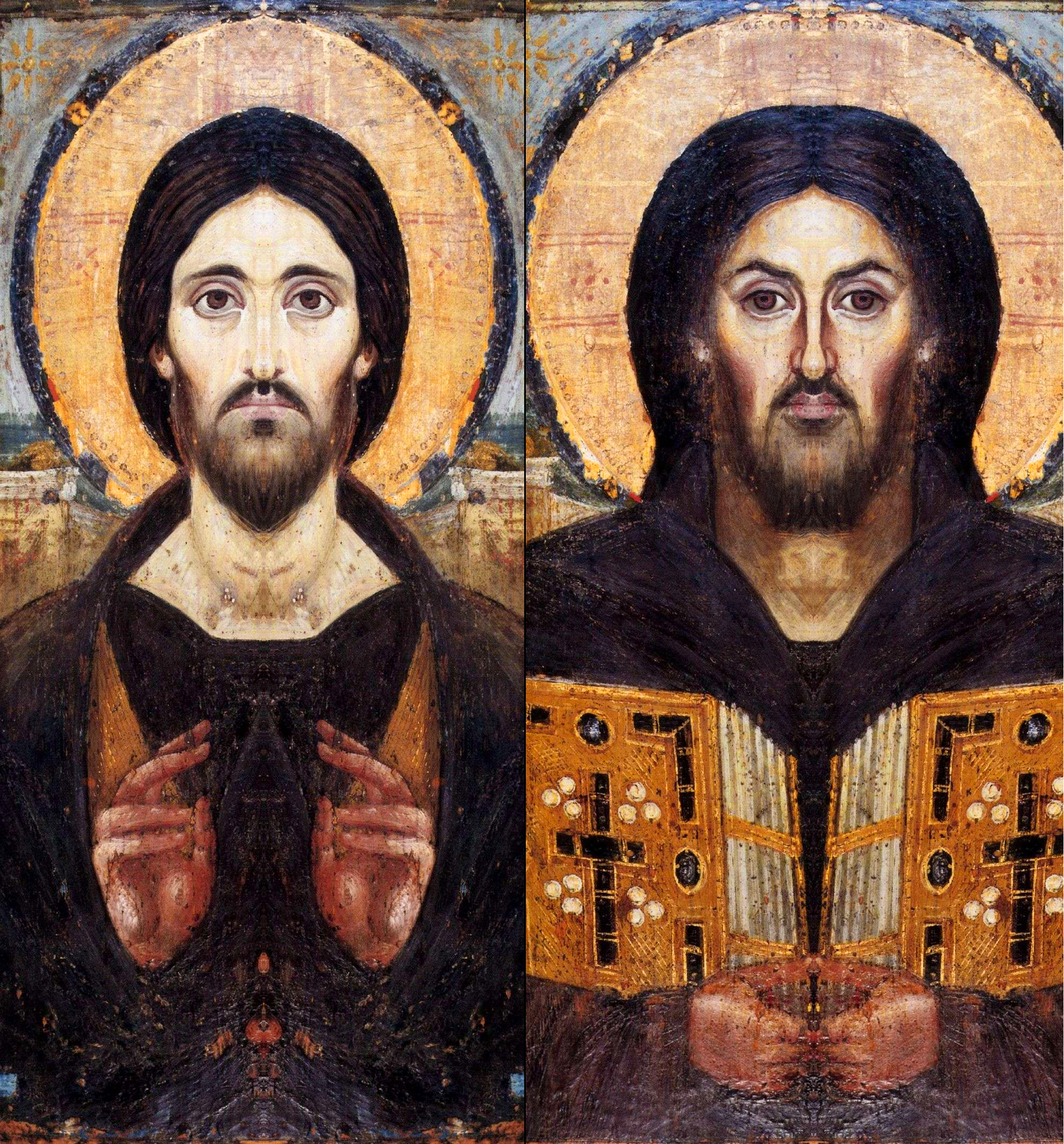
Mirrored composites of left and right sides of image

Dyophysitism (/daɪˈɒfɪsaɪtɪzəm/; from Greek δύο dyo, "two" and φύσις physis, "nature") is the Christological position that Jesus Christ is in two distinct, inseparable natures: divine and human. It is accepted by the majority of Christian denominations, including the Catholic Church, Eastern Orthodox Church, Church of the East, Anglicanism, Methodism, Reformed Christianity and Lutheranism. It is rejected by the Oriental Orthodox churches, who hold to Miaphysitism—that Jesus Christ is of two natures united into one composite nature—while rejecting Eutychianism as heresy along with other extant denominations.

Those who subscribe to the "two natures after the union" formula on either Chalcedonian and Nestorian side were referred to as dyophysites (/daɪˈɒfəsaɪts/). It is related to the doctrine of the hypostatic union and prosopic union.

== History ==
Development of dyophysite Christology was gradual; dyophysite tradition and its complex terminology were finally formulated as a result of the long Christological debates that were constant during the 4th and 5th centuries. Variations of dyophysite Christology steadily emerged in the teachings of Valentinus, Paul of Samosata, Diodore of Tarsus, Theodore of Mopsuestia, and others.

Dyophysitism stands in opposition to the views of monophysitism, the doctrine of Jesus having a sole divine nature, and miaphysitism, the doctrine that Christ is of both divine and human natures fully united into one composite nature. The Chalcedonian definition of dyophysitism holds that the two natures are completely and perfectly united in the one Person and hypostasis of Jesus Christ, in union with each other and co-existing without mixture, confusion or change; the Nestorian definition varies depending on certain readings of Nestorius , the general consensus is that Nestorius taught a Prosopic union which is the union of a multitude of parsopa , Nestorius himself claimed the union could be named hypostatic, leaving space for argument and various different interpretations. The importance of dyophysitism was often emphasized by prominent representatives of the Antiochene school in contrast to the Alexandrian school.

The miaphysites upheld the idea of one nature in Christ based on their understanding of Cyril of Alexandria's teachings, including his Twelve Anathemas, namely number 4 which states:

"If anyone shall divide between two persons or subsistences those expressions which are contained in the Evangelical and Apostolical writings, or which have been said concerning Christ by the Saints, or by himself, and shall apply some to him as to a man separate from the Word of God, and shall apply others to the only Word of God the Father, on the ground that they are fit to be applied to God: let him be anathema."

Dyophysitism was articulated in the Council of Chalcedon in 451, which produced the Chalcedonian Definition, that states:

We confess that one and the same Christ, Lord, and only-begotten Son, is to be acknowledged in two natures without confusion, change, division or separation. the distinction between the natures was never abolished by their union, but rather the character proper to each of the two natures was preserved as they came together in one person (prosopon) and one hypostasis.

Nature (ousia) in the Chalcedonian sense can be understood to be referring to a set of "powers and qualities which constitute a being" whereas person (prosopon) refers to "a concrete individual acting as subject in its own right."

For adherents, the hypostatic union is the center of Jesus's unity (his divinity and humanity being described as natures) whereas those who rejected the Council of Chalcedon saw his nature itself as the point of unity.

Dyophisitism has also been used to describe some aspects of Nestorianism, the doctrines ascribed to Nestorius of Constantinople. It is now generally agreed that some of his ideas were not far from those that eventually emerged as orthodox, but the orthodoxy of his formulation of the doctrine of Christ is still controversial among churches. This became especially prominent after the discovery of the Bazaar of Heracleides, which renewed interest in his work.

== Acceptance ==
After many debates and several councils, dyophysitism gained its official dogmatic form at the Council of Chalcedon and the Second Council of Constantinople of 553, which are accepted in the present day by a majority of Christian churches, including the Eastern Orthodox Church, the Roman Catholic Church, Eastern Catholic Churches, the Anglican Church, and the Old Catholic Church, as well as Reformed, Lutheran, and various other Christian denominations. Apart from that, the ancient Church of the East has preserved dyophysite Christology and other traditions of the Antiochene School.

There remain churches which hold to the Miaphysite positions, such as the Oriental Orthodox Churches.

== See also ==
- Ichthys (second century, Catacomb of Priscilla)
- First Council of Ephesus
