= Turcescu =

Turcescu is a Romanian surname. Notable people with the surname include:

- Lucian Turcescu (born 1966), Romanian-born Canadian professor of theology
- Robert Turcescu (born 1975), Romanian journalist, politician, TV presenter, media critic, radio personality, singer-songwriter
