= Nestorius =

Archbishop of Constantinople from c. 428 to 431

Mar Nestorius of Constantinople
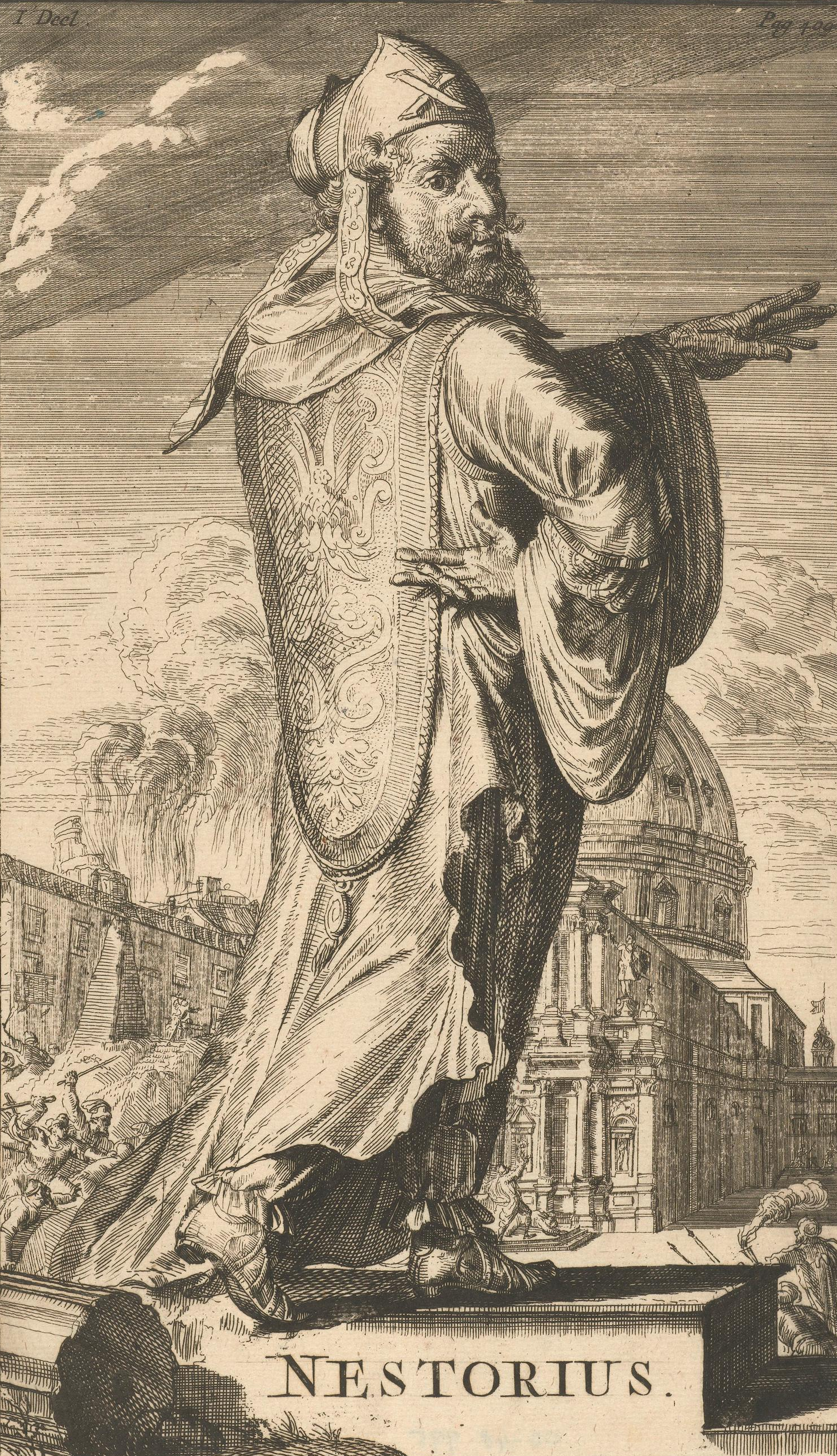
- Portrait by Romeyn de Hooghe, 1688

Archbishop of Constantinople
- Born: c. 386; Germanicia, Province of Syria, Roman Empire (now Kahramanmaraş, Turkey)
- Died: c. 451 (aged 64 or 65); Great Oasis of Hibis (al-Khargah), Egypt
- Venerated in: Church of the East
- Feast: Feast of the three Greek Doctors (5th Friday of Denha along with Theodore of Mopsuestia and Diodorus of Tarsus)
- Controversy: Christology, Theotokos

Nestorius of Constantinople (/ˌnɛsˈtɔːriəs/; Ancient Greek: Νεστόριος; Syriac: ܡܪܝ ܢܣܛܘܪܝܣ, Mār Nesṭōrīs; c. 386 – c. 451) was an early Christian prelate who served as Archbishop of Constantinople from 10 April 428 to 11 July 431. He was a Christian theologian from the Catechetical School of Antioch, and several of his teachings in the fields of Christology and Mariology were seen as controversial and heretical, causing major disputes. In 431, he was condemned and deposed from his see by the Council of Ephesus, presided over by his archrival Cyril of Alexandria, but the counter-council led by John I of Antioch vindicated him and deposed Cyril in return. Nestorius refrained from attending both of these councils and instead sought retirement from the Byzantine Emperor.

Nestorius used the title Theotokos (“God-Bearer”) with reference to Mary, mother of Jesus cautiously, in order that Christ's human and divine natures not be confused, as he believed that a creature (Mary) could not give birth to God, but only the human Christ. Nestorius advocated for the concept of the prosopic union of two natures (divine and human) of Christ, implying two separate, divided persons, over the later concept of a hypostatic union. He proposed instead the title of Christotokos ("Christ-bearer"). This brought him into conflict with Cyril of Alexandria and other prominent miaphysite churchmen of the time, who accused him of heresy.

If the babe and the Lord of the babe are one and the same person, the suspected phrase "inhabitant of the babe" must be simply intended as a safeguard against identification of the Word with the flesh. So Mary is Theotokos – because the Word was united to the temple ... which is in nature consubstantial with the holy Virgin ... It is in virtue of this union that the holy Virgin is called Theotokos

— Nestorius of Constantinople, Sermon XVIII

Nestorius sought to defend himself at the Council of Ephesus in 431, but instead found himself formally condemned for heresy by a majority of the bishops and was subsequently removed from his see. On his own request, he retired to his former monastery, in or near Antioch. In 435, Theodosius II sent him into exile in Upper Egypt, where he lived on until about 451, strenuously defending his views. His last major defender within the Roman Empire, Theodoret of Cyrrhus, finally agreed to anathematize him in 451 during the Council of Chalcedon.

From then on, he had no defenders within the empire, but the Church of the East in the Persian Empire never accepted his condemnation. That led later Western Christians to give the name Nestorian Church to the Church of the East where his teachings were deemed orthodox and in line with its own teachings. Nestorius is revered as among three "Greek Teachers" (in addition to Diodorus of Tarsus and Theodore of Mopsuestia) of the Church of the East. The East Syriac Eucharistic Service, which is known to be among the oldest in the world, incorporates prayers attributed to Nestorius himself.

The discovery, translation and publication of his Bazaar of Heracleides at the beginning of the 20th century have led to a reassessment of his theology in Western scholarship. It is now argued by some scholars and clergy that his ideas are compatible with later Chalcedonian theology and/or his condemnation at Ephesus was misplaced, but the orthodoxy of his formulation of the doctrine of Christ is still controversial.

== Life ==
Sources place the birth of Nestorius around 386 in the city of Germanicia in the Province of Syria, Roman Empire (now Kahramanmaraş in Turkey). A Syriac source mentioned that Nestorius was of Persian origin, while others have stated he was of Hellenised Antiochian or Syrian origin.

He received his clerical training as a pupil of Theodore of Mopsuestia in Antioch. He was living as a priest and monk in the monastery of Euprepius near the walls, and he gained a reputation for his sermons that led to his enthronement by Theodosius II, as Patriarch of Constantinople, following the 428 death of Sisinnius I of Constantinople.

== Nestorian controversy ==
Christological spectrum during the 5th–7th centuries showing the views of the Church of the East (light blue), the Chalcedonian Churches (light purple), and the Miaphysite Churches (pink).

Shortly after his arrival in Constantinople, Nestorius became involved in the disputes of two theological factions, which differed in their Christology. Nestorius tried to find a middle ground between those that emphasized the position that in Christ, God had been born as a man and insisted on calling the Virgin Mary Theotokos (Greek: Θεοτόκος, "God-bearer") and those that rejected that title because God, as an eternal being, could not have been born. He never divided Christ into two sons (Son of God and Son of Mary), but rather, he refused to attribute to the divine nature the human acts and sufferings of the man Jesus Christ. Nestorius suggested the title Christotokos (Χριστοτόκος, "Christ-bearer"), but he did not find acceptance on either side.

"Nestorianism" refers to the doctrine that there are two distinct hypostases in the Incarnate Christ, the one Divine and the other human. The teaching of all churches that accept the Council of Ephesus is that in the Incarnate Christ is a single hypostasis, God and man at once. That doctrine is known as the hypostatic union. Nestorius, on the other hand, affirmed that the two hypostases are not united as a single hypostasis, but that there exists a "connection" (Greek: συναφεία "synapheia") between them, and repeatedly stated that they are united in the one person (Prosopon, “πρόσωπον”) of Christ in a prosopic union. Caution must be taken in understanding the usage of prosopon, as it was used in different contexts to mean either person or properties. Thus, in the second usage, Nestorius stated that the prosopae (singular Prosopon "πρόσωπον", lit. "face"), and therefore the two hypostases (not persons), are united in the prosopic union, thought not in a manner of mixture or dissolution.

Nestorius's opponents charged him with detaching Christ's divinity and humanity into two persons existing in one body, thereby denying the reality of the Incarnation. It is not clear whether Nestorius actually taught that, though the Church of the East, and modern scholars, believe he taught one person.

Eusebius of Dorylaeum, a layman who later became the bishop of the neighbouring Dorylaeum, was the first to accuse Nestorius of heresy, but the most forceful opponent of Nestorius was Patriarch Cyril of Alexandria. This naturally caused great excitement at Constantinople, especially among the clergy, who were clearly not well disposed to Nestorius, the stranger from Antioch.

Cyril appealed to Pope Celestine I of Rome to make a decision, and Celestine delegated to Cyril the job of excommunicating Nestorius if he did not change his teachings within 10 days.

Nestorius had arranged with the emperor in the summer of 430 for the assembling of a council. He now hastened it, and the summons had been issued to patriarchs and metropolitans on 19 November, before the pope's sentence, delivered through Cyril of Alexandria, was served on Nestorius.

Emperor Theodosius II convoked a general church council, at Ephesus, itself a special seat for the veneration of Mary, where the Theotokos formula was popular. The Emperor and his wife supported Nestorius, but Pope Celestine I supported Cyril.

Cyril of Alexandria took charge of the Council of Ephesus in 431, opening debate before the long-overdue contingent of Eastern bishops from Antioch arrived. The council deposed Nestorius and declared him a heretic.

In Nestorius' own words:

When the followers of Cyril of Alexandria saw the vehemence of the emperor... they roused up a disturbance and discord among the people with an outcry, as though the emperor were opposed to God; they rose up against the nobles and the chiefs who acquiesced not in what had been done by them and they were running hither and thither. And... they took with them those who had been separated and removed from the monasteries by reason of their lives and their strange manners and had for this reason been expelled, and all who were of heretical sects and were possessed with fanaticism and with hatred against me. And one passion was in them all, Jews and pagans and all the sects, and they were busying themselves that they should accept without examination the things which were done without examination against me; and at the same time all of them, even those that had participated with me at table and in prayer and in thought, were agreed... against me and vowing vows one with another against me... In nothing were they divided.

While the council was in progress, John I of Antioch and the eastern bishops arrived and were furious to hear that Nestorius had already been condemned. They convened their own synod, at which Cyril of Alexandria was deposed. Both sides then appealed to the emperor.

Initially, the imperial government ordered both Nestorius and Cyril of Alexandria to be deposed and exiled. Nestorius was made to return to his monastery at Antioch, and Maximianus of Constantinople was consecrated Archbishop of Constantinople in his place. Cyril was eventually allowed to return after bribing various courtiers.

== Later events ==
In the following months, 17 bishops who supported Nestorius's doctrine were removed from their sees. Eventually, John I of Antioch was obliged to abandon Nestorius, in March 433. On 3 August 435, Theodosius II issued an imperial edict that exiled Nestorius from the monastery in Antioch in which he had been staying to a monastery in the Great Oasis of Hibis (al-Khargah), in Egypt, securely within the diocese of Cyril of Alexandria. The monastery suffered attacks by desert bandits, and Nestorius was injured in one such raid. Nestorius seems to have survived there until at least 450 (given the evidence of The Book of Heraclides). Nestorius died shortly after the Council of Chalcedon in 451, in Thebaid, Egypt.

== Writings ==
Very few of Nestorius' writings survive, many being destroyed by his opponents. There are several letters preserved in the records of the Council of Ephesus and fragments of a few others. About 30 sermons are extant, mostly in fragmentary form. The only complete treatise is the lengthy defence of his theological position, The Bazaar of Heraclides, written in exile at the Oasis, which survives in Syriac translation. It must have been written no earlier than 450, as he knows of the death of the Emperor Theodosius II (29 July 450). There is an English translation of this work, but it was criticised as inaccurate, as well as the older French translation. Further scholarly analyses have shown that several early interpolations have been made in the text, sometime in the second half of the 5th century.

=== Bazaar of Heracleides ===
In 1895, a 16th-century book manuscript containing a copy of a text written by Nestorius was discovered by American missionaries in the library of the Nestorian patriarch in the mountains at Qudshanis, Hakkari. This book had suffered damage during Muslim conquests but was substantially intact, and copies were taken secretly. The Syriac translation had the title of the Bazaar of Heracleides. The original 16th-century manuscript was destroyed in 1915 during the Turkish and Kurdish genocide of Assyrian Christians. Edition of this work is primarily to be attributed to the German scholar, Friedrich Loofs, of Halle University.

In the Bazaar, written about 450, Nestorius denies the heresy for which he was condemned and instead affirms of Christ "the same one is twofold" — an expression that some consider similar to the formulation of the Council of Chalcedon. Nestorius' earlier surviving writings, however, including his letter written in response to Cyril of Alexandria's charges against him, contain material that has been interpreted by some to imply that at that time he held that Christ had two persons. Others view this material as merely emphasising the distinction between how the pre-incarnate Logos is the Son of God and how the incarnate Emmanuel, including his physical body, is truly called the Son of God.

== Legacy ==
Though Nestorius had been condemned by the Imperial church, there was a faction loyal to him and his teachings. Following the Nestorian schism, many Nestorian Christians were forced to relocate to the communities within the Persian Empire; thus, the church took on names such as "Nestorian Church" and "Church of Persia".

In modern times, the Assyrian Church of the East, the descendant of the historical Church of the East, reveres Nestorius as a saint, but the modern church does not subscribe to the entirety of the Nestorian doctrine as it has traditionally been understood in the West to mean "two persons", believing that the West misunderstood and misrepresented his theology, and rejects that Nestorius taught any heresy. Patriarch Dinkha IV repudiated the exonym Nestorian on the occasion of his accession in 1976.

After the Council of Ephesus, within the Byzantine Empire, the doctrine of Monophysitism developed in reaction to Nestorianism by Eutyches, who asserted that Christ had a monos (sole) nature, the human nature being fully absorbed into the divine, in contrast to Miaphysitism, which affirms a mia (one) composite nature from both, fully divine and fully human, "without change, commingling, division, or separation". Despite being condemned at the Third Council of Ephesus by the Oriental Orthodox Churches, Monophysitism is sometimes attributed to them, either intentionally or out of ignorance.

== Bibliography ==
- Anastos, Milton V. (1962). "Nestorius Was Orthodox". Dumbarton Oaks Papers. 16: 117–140. doi:10.2307/1291160. JSTOR 1291160.
- Bethune-Baker, James F. (1908). Nestorius and His Teaching: A Fresh Examination of the Evidence. Cambridge: Cambridge University Press. ISBN 9781107432987.
- Bevan, George A. (2009). "The Last Days of Nestorius in the Syriac Sources". Journal of the Canadian Society for Syriac Studies. 7 (2007): 39–54. doi:10.31826/9781463216153-004. ISBN 9781463216153.
- Bevan, George A. (2013). "Interpolations in the Syriac Translation of Nestorius' Liber Heraclidis". Studia Patristica. 68: 31–39.
- Braaten, Carl E. (1963). "Modern Interpretations of Nestorius". Church History. 32 (3): 251–267. doi:10.2307/3162772. JSTOR 3162772. S2CID 162735558.
- Brock, Sebastian P. (1996). "The "Nestorian" Church - A Lamentable Misnomer" (PDF). Bulletin of the John Rylands Library. 78 (3): 23–35. doi:10.7227/BJRL.78.3.3.
- Brock, Sebastian P. (1999). "The Christology of the Church of the East in the Synods of the Fifth to Early Seventh Centuries: Preliminary Considerations and Materials". Doctrinal Diversity - Varieties of Early Christianity. New York and London: Garland Publishing. pp. 281–298. ISBN 9780815330714.
- Brock, Sebastian P. (2006). Fire from Heaven - Studies in Syriac Theology and Liturgy. Aldershot: Ashgate. ISBN 9780754659082.
- Burgess, Stanley M. (1989). The Holy Spirit: Eastern Christian Traditions. Peabody, Mass.: Hendrickson Publishers. ISBN 9780913573815.
- Chapman, John (1911). "Nestorius and Nestorianism". The Catholic Encyclopedia. Vol. 10. New York: Robert Appleton Company.
- Chesnut, Roberta C. (1978). "The Two Prosopa in Nestorius' Bazaar of Heracleides". The Journal of Theological Studies. 29 (2): 392–409. doi:10.1093/jts/XXIX.2.392.
- Edwards, Mark (2009). Catholicity and Heresy in the Early Church. Farnham: Ashgate. ISBN 9780754662914.
- González, Justo L. (2005). Essential Theological Terms. Louisville: Westminster John Knox Press. ISBN 9780664228101.
- McGuckin, John A. (1994). St. Cyril of Alexandria - The Christological Controversy: Its History, Theology, and Texts. Leiden: Brill. ISBN 9789004312906.
- Grillmeier, Aloys (1975) [1965]. Christ in Christian Tradition - From the Apostolic Age to Chalcedon (451) (2nd revised ed.). Louisville: Westminster John Knox Press. ISBN 9780664223014.
- Hill, Henry, ed. (1988). Light from the East - A Symposium on the Oriental Orthodox and Assyrian Churches. Toronto: Anglican Book Centre. ISBN 9780919891906.
- Hodgson, Leonard; Driver, Godfrey R., eds. (1925). Nestorius - The Bazaar of Heracleides. Oxford: Clarendon Press. ISBN 9781725202399.
- Kuhn, Michael F. (2019). God is One: A Christian Defence of Divine Unity in the Muslim Golden Age. Carlisle: Langham Publishing. ISBN 9781783685776.
- Loon, Hans van (2009). The Dyophysite Christology of Cyril of Alexandria. Leiden-Boston: Brill. ISBN 9789004173224.
- Loofs, Friedrich (1914). Nestorius and his Place in the History of Christian Doctrine. Cambridge: Cambridge University Press. ISBN 9781107450769.
- Louth, Andrew (2004). "John Chrysostom to Theodoret of Cyrrhus". The Cambridge History of Early Christian Literature. Cambridge: Cambridge University Press. pp. 342–352. ISBN 9780521460835.
- McEnerney, John I. (1987). St. Cyril of Alexandria Letters 51–110. Washington: The Catholic University of America Press. ISBN 9780813215143.
- Meyendorff, John (1989). Imperial Unity and Christian Divisions - The Church 450–680. Crestwood, NY: St. Vladimir's Seminary Press. ISBN 9780881410563.
- Nau, François; Bedjan, Paul; Brière, Maurice, eds. (1910). Nestorius - Le livre d'Héraclide de Damas. Paris: Letouzey et Ané.
- Norris, Richard A., ed. (1980). The Christological Controversy. Minneapolis: Fortess Press. ISBN 9780800614119.
- Pásztori-Kupán, István (2006). Theodoret of Cyrus. London and New York: Routledge. ISBN 9781134391769.
- Reinink, Gerrit J. (1995). "Edessa Grew Dim and Nisibis Shone Forth - The School of Nisibis at the Transition of the Sixth-Seventh Century". Centres of Learning - Learning and Location in Pre-modern Europe and the Near East. Leiden: Brill. pp. 77–89. ISBN 9004101934.
- Reinink, Gerrit J. (2009). "Tradition and the Formation of the "Nestorian" Identity in Sixth- to Seventh-Century Iraq". Church History and Religious Culture. 89 (1–3): 217–250. doi:10.1163/187124109X407916. JSTOR 23932289.
- Seleznyov, Nikolai N. (2010). "Nestorius of Constantinople - Condemnation, Suppression, Veneration: With special reference to the role of his name in East-Syriac Christianity". Journal of Eastern Christian Studies. 62 (3–4): 165–190.
- Wessel, Susan (2004). Cyril of Alexandria and the Nestorian Controversy - The Making of a Saint and of a Heretic. Oxford: Oxford University Press. ISBN 9780199268467.

Titles of the Great Christian Church
Preceded by Sisinnius I	Archbishop of Constantinople; 428 – 431	Succeeded by Maximianus
