= Society for Romanian Studies =

The Society for Romanian Studies (SRS), founded in 1973, is an international inter-disciplinary academic organization dedicated to Romanian studies. It draws its members – junior and senior scholars, graduate students, and government experts – primarily from North America, Romania, the Republic of Moldova and Western Europe. Through its activities, the SRS wishes to facilitate academic exchange within and across a multitude of disciplines, including history, sociology, geography, anthropology and ethnography, political science, philosophy, law and justice studies, literature and linguistics, economics and business, international affairs, religious, gender, film and media studies, art history, music and education. The society understands Romanian studies broadly to encompass political, socioeconomic and cultural developments in Romania and the Republic of Moldova, the situation of their ethnic minorities and their relations with the ethnic majority, as well as the position of Romanians and Moldovans living outside those countries.

== Activities ==
The society holds its Annual General Meeting at the annual conference of the Association for Slavic, East European, and Eurasian Studies (ASEEES), organized in late November in the United States. At that time, the Society also offers an annual graduate student essay prize for an outstanding unpublished essay or thesis chapter written in English by a graduate student and a biennial book award to the best single-authored scholarly title published in English in any social science or humanities discipline on a Romanian studies topic. SRS members also attend conferences organized by different universities and other scholarly associations.

Since 1986, the society has held several well-attended international conferences gathering Romanian studies scholars from a variety of countries. The First International Congress was held at the Sorbonne in Paris in 1986 with the help of Asociatia Internationala de Studii Romanesti. It was later decided to organize these international meetings in Romania. Subsequent conferences were then held in Iași in 1993, Cluj in 1997, Suceava in 2001, Constanța in 2007, Sibiu in 2012, Bucharest in 2015, and Timișoara in 2022. The 2025 Conference of the Society for Romanian studies is set to be held in May 2025, hosted by Babeș-Bolyai University in Cluj-Napoca.

In 2013, the society launched a book collection in partnership with Polirom, Romania’s largest publisher of academic titles. Co-ordinated by Irina Livezeanu and Lavinia Stan, the Studii Româneşti/Romanian Studies/Études Roumaines/Rumänische Studien series publishes scholarly books in Romanian written or edited by SRS members. It considers for publication Romanian translations of scholarly monographs already published in a foreign language, original scholarly monographs written in Romanian, and edited collections of Romanian-language essays dealing with a unifying theme. Book proposals must deal with Romania and/or Moldova and the populations living on their territories or with the Romanian and Moldovan diasporas and cultures, and they must have primarily an academic profile. Contributions may have a disciplinary, interdisciplinary or multidisciplinary focus, drawing on history, political science, sociology, anthropology, law, economics, linguistics, literature, art history and other fields.

The American Historical Association and the American Political Science Association are some of the scholarly organizations with which the SRS is affiliated. The society has joint-membership arrangements with the South East European Studies Association (SEESA), as well as the Romanian Studies Association of America (RSAA). Recently, the society has welcomed the Faculty of Political Science at the University of Bucharest, the Bucharest Academy of Economic Studies, and CEPOS at the University of Craiova among its organizational members.

== Conferences and meetings ==
The Society for Romanian Studies has organized several conferences, congresses, and meetings throughout its history, either as stand-alone conferences or jointly with others (most notably with the American Association for the Advancement of Slavic Studies, now the Association for Slavic, East European, and Eurasian Studies).

Since 1993, its standalone international conferences have taken place in Romania, with business or joint meetings in North America. The below list includes joint conferences, annual meetings, annual conferences, and business meetings of the Society for Romanian Studies.

Conferences and meetings of the Society for Romanian Studies
Year	Dates	Host city	Host country	Host institution(s)	Type
1986	July 1–4	Paris	France	Sorbonne University	International conference
1987	November 7	Boston, Massachusetts	United States	Emerson College	Annual conference
1988	October 21–22	Lincoln, Nebraska	United States	University of Nebraska	Annual conference
1989	November 3	Chicago, Illinois	United States	American Association for the Advancement of Slavic Studies (AAASS)	National meeting
1990	October 18–21	Washington, D.C.	United States	AAASS	Business meeting
1991	November 22–25	Miami, Florida	United States	AAASS	National meeting
1992	November 19–22	Phoenix, Arizona	United States	AAASS	Business meeting
1993	July 6–10	Iași	Romania	UAIC Iași, Academia Română, A.D. Xenopol Institute of History	International conference
1994	February 18–19	New York City, NY	United States	Romanian Cultural Center	National meeting
1994	November 15–16	New York City, NY	United States	Romanian Cultural Center	National meeting
1994	November 17–20	Philadelphia, PA	United States	AAASS	Business meeting
1995	April 8	New York City, NY	United States	Romanian Cultural Center	Graduate student conference
1995	October 24–25	Washington, D.C.	United States	Embassy of Romania	National meeting
1995	October 27	Washington, D.C.	United States	AAASS	Business meeting
1996	April 26	Washington, D.C.	United States	Embassy of Romania	Conference on business and politics
1996	November 12	Boston, Massachusetts	United States	Boston College	National meeting
1996	November 15	Boston, Massachusetts	United States	AAASS	Business meeting
1997	July 1–6	Cluj-Napoca	Romania	Academia Română, Babeș-Bolyai University	International conference
1997	November 19–20	Seattle, WA	United States	University of Washington, AAASS	National meeting
1998	March 20–21	Washington, D.C.	United States	Georgetown University, Embassy of Romania	25th anniversary conference
1999	April 17	New York City, NY	United States	Romanian Cultural Center	National meeting
1999	November 19	St. Louis, MO	United States	AAASS	Business meeting
2000	November 10	Denver, CO	United States	AAASS	Business meeting
2001	July 9–12	Suceava	Romania	University of Suceava	International conference
2001	November 16	Arlington, VA	United States	AAASS	Business meeting
2002	November 22	Pittsburgh, PA	United States	AAASS	Business meeting
2003	November 21	Toronto, ON	Canada	AAASS	Business meeting
2005	November 4	Salt Lake City, UT	United States	AAASS	Business meeting
2006	March 24–25	New York City, NY	United States	Romanian Cultural Institute, Columbia University	Business meeting
2007	June 25–28	Constanța	Romania	Ovidius University	International conference
2007	November 17	New Orleans, LA	United States	AAASS	Business meeting
2008	November 21	Philadelphia, PA	United States	AAASS	Business meeting
2009	November 13	Boston, MA	United States	AAASS	Business meeting
2010	November 19	Los Angeles, CA	United States	Association for Slavic, East European, and Eurasian Studies (ASEEES)	Business meeting
2011	November 18	Washington, D.C.	United States	ASEEES	Business meeting
2012	July 2–4	Sibiu	Romania	Lucian Blaga University	International conference
2012	November 16	New Orleans, LA	United States	ASEEES	Business meeting
2013	November 22	Boston, MA	United States	ASEEES	Business meeting
2015	June 17–19	Bucharest	Romania	University of Bucharest	International conference
2018	June 26–30	Bucharest	Romania	Bucharest Academy of Economic Studies	International conference
2022	June 15–17	Timișoara	Romania	Universitatea de Vest, Muzeul Național de Artă	International conference
2025	May 29–31	Cluj-Napoca	Romania	Babeș-Bolyai University	International conference

== Presidents of the Society for Romanian Studies ==
- Stephen Fischer-Galati, 1978–1980
- Mary Ellen Fischer, 1981–1982
- Rodica Botoman, 1983–1984
- Walter M. Bacon, Jr., 1985–1986
- Earl A. Pope, 1987–1988
- Barbara Jelavich, 1989–1990
- George R. Ursul, 1991–1993
- Joseph Harrington, 1994–1996
- Paul D. Quinlan, 1997–2000
- James Augerot, 2001–2005
- Paul E. Michelson, 2006–2009
- Irina Livezeanu, 2010–2013
- Lavinia Stan, 2014–2019
- Roland Clark, 2019–2022
- James A. Kapaló, 2023–present
