= Irina Livezeanu =

Romanian-American historian (born 1952)

Irina Livezeanu is a Romanian-American historian. Her research interests include Eastern Europe, Eastern European Jewry, intellectuals and politics, regionalism, and the avant-agarde in Romania and Europe. Several of her publications deal with the history of Romania, Moldova, and Bessarabia. She is Emeritus Faculty in the Department of History and the Jewish Studies Program at the University of Pittsburgh. In 2010–2013 she served as president of the Society for Romanian Studies.

== Biography ==
Livezeanu was born in Bucharest, and emigrated to the United States at the age of 12. She received a B.A. in Ancient Greek from Swarthmore College (1974), and a M.A. (1979) and a Ph.D. (1986) from the University of Michigan. She began her academic career with a post-doc at the University of California at Berkeley, and took her first teaching job at Colby College, between 1987 and 1991. Livezeanu later taught at the Ohio State University (1991–1994), and, between 1994 and 2021, at the University of Pittsburgh. In 1996, she was visiting professor at the Babeş-Bolyai University in Cluj-Napoca, Romania.

Her book Cultural Politics in Greater Romania: Regionalism, Nation Building, and Ethnic Struggle, 1918-1930, published by Cornell University Press, was awarded Heldt Prize (1995) by the Association for Women in Slavic Studies. The volume deals with the creation of Greater Romania during the final years of World War I and its interwar history.

Livezeanu was a senior fellow at the New York University Erich Maria Remarque Institute, a European Studies Fellow at the Library of Congress John W. Kluge Center, and a Senior Fellow Collegium Budapest – Institute of Advanced Study. She is also known as a promoter of Romanian cinema: in 2007, she organized the festival Romanian Cinema on the Edge at the University of Pittsburgh, with assistance from the Romanian Cultural Institute. It showcased films by Lucian Pintilie (Reconstituirea), Corneliu Porumboiu (12:08 East of Bucharest and The Paper Will Be Blue), Cristian Mungiu (Occident), and Cristian Nemescu (California Dreamin').

== Views and contributions ==
In analyzing nationalist successes in early 20th century Romania (Cultural Politics in Greater Romania), Irina Livezeanu challenges the theories of British-Czech social anthropologist Ernest Gellner, specifically his definition of nationalism as a product of industrial society. She applied Gellner's concepts to the case of predominantly rural Romania and, in this context, linked them to the conclusions of Liah Greenfeld. According to Greenfeld and Livezeanu, although nationalism was generated by economic and social development in England, it grew independently from that point on, and was equally able to impose itself in less developed regions.

Applying these concepts to the case of Greater Romania, and, in particular, to the process of Romanianization associated with the latter regime, she concluded that, although Transylvania, Bukovina and Bessarabia joined the Kingdom of Romania on the basis of ethnic and cultural links, the governments and cultural establishment in Bucharest also directed a process of centralization and cultural assimilation. According to historian Constantin Iordachi, this pro-Romanianization stand was equivalent to "a Kulturkampf", and often meant "sacrificing democratic and pluralistic values on the altar of historically-motivated nationalism." Based on the book, University of Tampa professor Thomas J. Hegarty argued that "Romania's swollen bureaucracy, in alliance with the nationalist intelligentsia for whom it provided employment, attempted to compensate for the thinness of ethnic Romanian urban civil society with an interventionist strategy of cultural activism." This process was also connected to the underrepresentation of Romanians among the elites of the newly acquired territories, a situation which, despite Romania having committed itself to the Minority Treaties at the Paris Peace Conference, Romanianization policies attempted to overturn.

Irina Livezeanu's analysis also evidences the role of alternatives to unionism in the Romanian-inhabited regions of Austria-Hungary, including House of Habsburg loyalism, advocates of regional autonomy, and federalists endorsing the United States of Greater Austria. She cites examples of Romanian nationalists such as Aurel Popovici and Constantin Tomaszczuk, whose discourse, standing as an alternative to unionism, was marginalized by most other historians.

In the second part of the book, Livezeanu develops an original take on the rise of fascism and the far right in interwar Romania, which she connects with the large number of ethnic minorities among the enlarged population of Greater Romania, and the impact of nationalist policies and discourse in Romanian culture and society. She sees the Iron Guard, Romania's main fascist group, as an autonomous development, largely independent from its Italian fascist or Nazi counterparts, but dependent on its contacts with the local middle class, bureaucracy and intelligentsia. Building on the conclusions of Israeli historian Zeev Sternhell, as well as on her interpretation of texts by Romanian fascist politician Nichifor Crainic, she proposes that Romanian fascism was actually a revolutionary-minded aspect of earlier conservative nationalism.

In analyzing the transformations undergone in Greater Romania, she also points to the rise in antisemitism as a direct consequence of the land reform, arguing that the "national issue" (of Romanian versus foreigners) replaced references to the "social issue" (of peasants versus other classes), allowing Romanian nationalists to identify with the peasantry and contrast it with the local Jewish community. Livezeanu thus indicated that the contrast was generally being made between Romanian peasants and the Jewish element, perceived as not just foreign, but also "cosmopolitan and capitalist".

One of Livezeanu's main conclusions deals with the competing social and political projects of the period, and specifically with the contrast between, on one side, the urbane and capitalist goals of National Liberal theorists such as Ştefan Zeletin, and, on the other, rural protectionist and populist ideas both right-wing and left-wing (from the Iron Guard and the peasant theocracy imagined by Nae Ionescu to socialist-influenced Poporanism). She noted that liberalism, capitalist integration in the rural sphere, and industrialization had failed to impose themselves by the start of World War I, and that some of the early reforms associated with the National Liberals were in fact censored by protectionists. However, she proposed that the education reform carried out by the National Liberal politician Spiru Haret, often seen as a victory of Poporanism, was actually proof of the party having an elaborate plan to modernize the rural areas. Thus, she argued, the policies of Haret and his colleague and successor Constantin Anghelescu were partly overturned by supporters of rural protectionism, both populist (Alexandru Averescu) and fascist (the Iron Guard's National Legionary State).

Livezeanu's thesis on the birth of Romanian fascism was criticized by Constantin Iordachi, who argued that the link between the local middle class and far right movement was only obvious in the cases of fascist intellectuals such as Nae Ionescu and Crainic, whereas the Iron Guard is known to have engaged in an open conflict and, eventually, a bloody battle with moderate nationalist groupings. He nonetheless praised Cultural Politics in Greater Romania for its innovative approach, while noting that: "the examination of the civil society concept in the interwar context presents a special interest for contemporary Romanian society, given that it evidences the measure in which the obsession over historical justice, excessive centralization, xenophobia and ethnocentrism undermine the development of democratic pluralism, alienate any potential sentiment of loyalty the national minorities might have toward the Romanian state, bereaving Romanian society of important creative forces." Historian Ovidiu Pecican also cited Livezeanu's study, alongside those of Jean Ancel, as evidence that the image of interwar Romania as "solely nimbed by the progresses following stately unification" needed to be amended.

At a conference hosted by the Romanian Cultural Institute in 2007, Livezeanu spoke against what she called "historic and historiographic autarky" in contemporary Romanian culture, arguing that it was a still-surviving consequence of censorship imposed by the Romanian communist regime. She proposed that the reemergence of nationalist themes in writing history after the Revolution of 1989 was owed to the ongoing influence of various "nationalist-communist" ideologues, as well as to the prominence of nationalist thinkers during the interwar period, but she argued that the phenomenon was on the decline, and that younger Romanian historians would be able to relate to such topics "as mere researchers". She argued that, given the moment, "I believe that any study which would question and deconstruct rather than defend, excuse or accuse various institutions [...] is worth the effort."

The 2000 Cornell paperback edition of the Cultural Politics in Greater Romania is substantially revised and corrected edition of the book.

== Works ==
- Cultural Politics in Greater Romania: Regionalism, Nation Building, and Ethnic Struggle, 1918–1930, Cornell University Press, 1995 and 2000. ISBN 0-8014-8688-2
- with June Pachuta Farris, Eds.: Women & Gender in Central and Eastern Europe, Russia, and Eurasia: A Comprehensive Bibliography. Volume I Southeastern and East Central Europe, M.E. Sharpe (Routledge), 2007. ISBN 0-7656-0737-9
- Cultură şi naţionalism în România Mare, 1918-1930, Humanitas, 1998. ISBN 973-28-0865-9
- with Arpad von Klimo, eds.: The Routledge History of East Central Europe since 1700 2017

Book Series Editor https://srstudies.org/book-series/ Studii Româneşti/Romanian Studies/Études Roumaines/Rumänische Studien for the Society for Romanian Studies & Polirom Publishing House, Iaşi, Romania
