= Lavinia Stan =

Canadian-Romanian political scientist

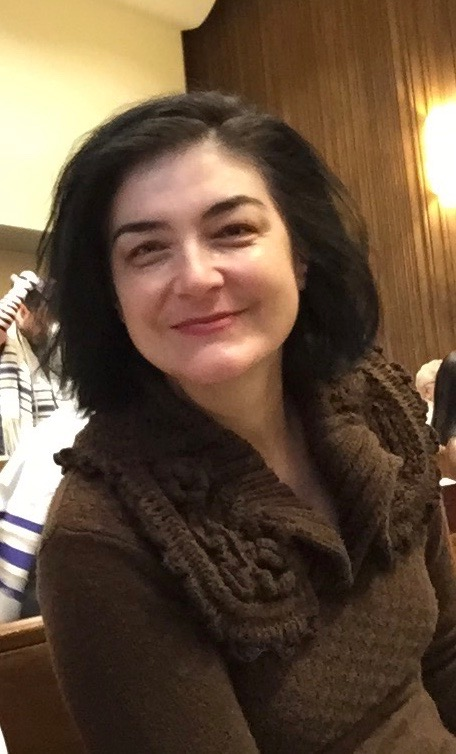
- Born: 1966 (age 59–60); Pitești, Socialist Republic of Romania
- Board member of: Society for Romanian Studies

Academic background
- Education: ASE
- Alma mater: U of T

Academic work
- Discipline: Political Science
- Institutions: St. Francis Xavier University; ULBS
- Main interests: Transitional justice, religion and politics, and democratization
- Website: laviniastan.wordpress.com

Lavinia Stan (born 1966) is a professor of political science at St. Francis Xavier University in Canada, known for her work on post-communist democratization. She is a prominent figure in transitional justice scholarship, religion and politics, as well as democratization studies.

== Education and career ==
After obtaining a degree from the Bucharest Academy of Economic Studies, she emigrated to Canada in 1991. Stan then earned a Ph.D. in Political Science from the University of Toronto. Stan is a Professor of Political Science at St. Francis Xavier University in Nova Scotia. In November 2024, she was appointed European Research Area (ERA) Chair at the Lucian Blaga University of Sibiu, Romania.

From 2010 to 2019, she served as Vice-President and subsequently President of the Society for Romanian Studies, during which time the society introduced two publication initiatives: a book series sponsored jointly with the Romanian publisher Polirom, and the peer-reviewed Journal of Romanian Studies. She has been Editor-in-Chief of the peer-reviewed journal Women's Studies International Forum, published by Elsevier, and in December 2023 was appointed Editor of East European Politics and Societies. Stan has also acted as an expert witness in cases concerning deportation, asylum, property restitution, and corruption in American and British courts. She serves on the editorial boards of several academic journals.

== Publications ==
Stan's research has focused on three main areas: transitional justice, religion and politics, and democratization. Her work has received funding from institutions including Horizon Europe, the Social Sciences and Humanities Research Council of Canada, the Brian Mulroney Institute of Governance, the British Arts and Humanities Research Council, and the Directorate-General for Justice, Freedom and Security of the European Commission, amounting to over 3 million Euros.

In her studies of religion and politics in post-communist Romania, Stan has examined the role of the Orthodox Church in democratic consolidation. She has also researched the Church's collaboration with the communist-era secret police, the Securitate, as well as disputes over the restitution of property from the Orthodox Church to the Greek Catholic Church. Her work on transitional justice in post-communist countries has highlighted the role of civil society actors, including individual political figures, in advancing reckoning processes where state actors have been unwilling to do so.

She has authored, co-authored or edited the following volumes:

=== Transitional justice ===
- Encyclopedia of Transitional Justice. Cambridge University Press, 2023, second edition. ISBN 9781108678537. Co-edited with Nadya Nedelsky.
- Transitional Justice and the Former Soviet Union: Reviewing the Past, Looking toward the Future. Cambridge University Press, 2018. ISBN 1107198135. Co-edited with Cynthia M. Horne.
- Post-Communist Transitional Justice: Lessons from Twenty-Five Years of Experience. Cambridge University Press, 2015. ISBN 1107065569. Co-edited with Nadya Nedelsky.
- Encyclopedia of Transitional Justice. Cambridge University Press, 2013, first edition. ISBN 9780521196277. Co-edited with Nadya Nedelsky.
- Transitional Justice in Post-Communist Romania: The Politics of Memory. Cambridge University Press, 2013. ISBN 9781107020535.
- Transitional Justice in Eastern Europe and the Former Soviet Union: Reckoning with the Communist Past. Routledge, 2009. ISBN 978-0-415-59041-9. Romanian translation: Prezentul trecutului recent: Lustrație și decomunizare în postcomunism. Bucharest: Curtea Veche, 2010. ISBN 978-973-669-956-6.

=== Religion and politics ===
- Churches, Memory and Justice in Post-Communism. Springer, 2021. ISBN 978-3-030-56063-8. Co-edited with L. Turcescu.
- Church Reckoning with Communism in Post-1989 Romania. Rowman & Littlefield, 2021. ISBN 978-1498580274. Co-edited with L. Turcescu.
- Justice, Memory and Redress in Romania: New Insights. Cambridge Scholars, 2017. ISBN 978-1-4438-3152-9. Co-edited with L. Turcescu.
- Church, State and Democracy in Expanding Europe. Oxford University Press, 2011. ISBN 978-0-19-533710-5. Co-authored with L. Turcescu.
- Religion and Politics in Post-communist Romania. Oxford University Press, 2007. ISBN 0-19-530853-0. Romanian translation: Religie si politica in Romania postcomunista. Bucharest: Curtea Veche, 2010. ISBN 978-973-669-966-5. Co-authored with L. Turcescu.

=== Democratization ===
- East Central Europe since 1989: Politics, Culture, and Society. Routledge, 2024. ISBN 9781032319209. Co-authored with Sabrina P. Ramet.
- Post-Communist Progress and Stagnation at 35: The Case of Romania. Springer, 2024. ISBN 978-3031557491. Co-edited with Diane Vancea.
- Post-Communist Romania at 25: Civic and Uncivic Values and Institutions. Rowman & Littlefield, 2015. ISBN 1498501117. Co-edited with Diane Vancea.
- 1989–2009: Incredibila aventura a democratiei dupa comunism (interviews with Western and Romanian specialists on Eastern Europe on the occasion of 20 years since the collapse of communism). Iași, Romania: Editura Institutul European, 2010. ISBN 978-973-611-657-5.
- Leaders and Laggards: Governance, Civicness and Ethnicity in Post-Communist Romania. Columbia University Press, 2003. ISBN 978-0-88033-513-3.
- Romania in Transition. Dartmouth College Press, 1997. ISBN 978-1-85521-886-4.

=== Translations into Romanian ===
In addition, Stan translated two volumes into Romanian:

- Étienne de La Boétie, Discourse on Voluntary Servitude, trans. from French with Sabina Elena Stan. Bucharest: Universal Dalsi Press, 1994.
- Carl Schmitt, Political Theology, trans. with Lucian Turcescu, Bucharest: Universal Dalsi Press, 1995.

=== Annual reports on Moldova and Romania ===
From 1997 to 2003 she published the quarterly report on the Republic of Moldova in East European Constitutional Review, while since 2006 she has co-authored the annual report regarding political developments in Romania for European Journal of Political Research.
