= God-man (Christianity) =

Hypostatic union on Christ in religion

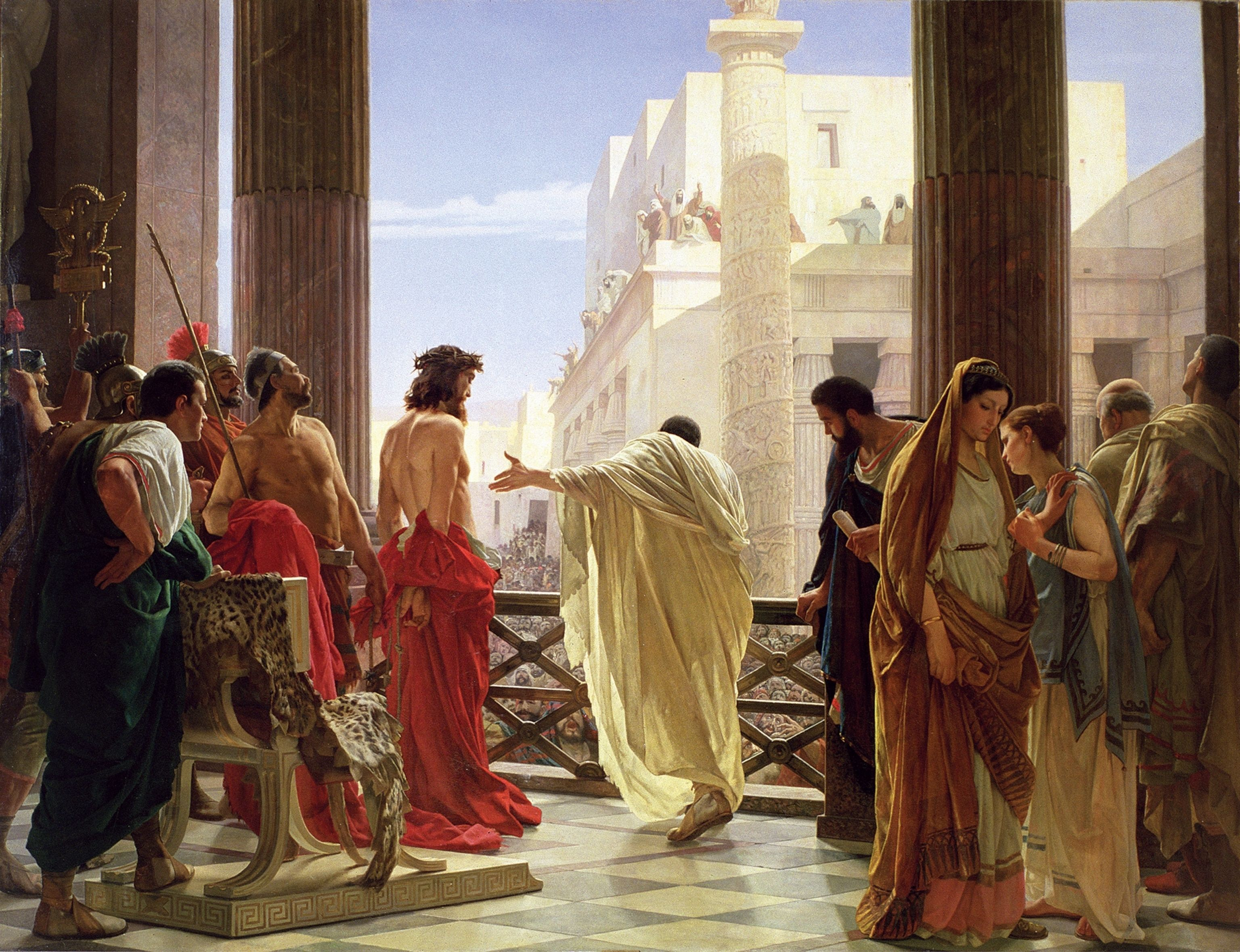
Ecce Homo by Antonio Ciseri

God-man (Koine Greek: θεάνθρωπος, romanized: theánthropos; Latin: deus homo) is a term which refers to the incarnation and the hypostatic union of Christ, which are two of mainstream Christianity's most widely accepted and revered christological doctrines.

== Origins ==
The first usage of the term "God-man" as a theological concept appears in the writing of the 3rd-century Church Father Origen:

This substance of a soul, then, being intermediate between God and the flesh – it being impossible for the nature of God to intermingle with a body without an intermediate instrument – the God-man is born.

== Posterity ==
The term is also used by the medieval philosopher and theologian Anselm of Canterbury (11th century) in his treatise on the atonement, Cur Deus Homo ("Why God Became Man").

The term is used in the Westminster Larger Catechism, where it says:

Christ is exalted in his sitting at the right hand of God, in that as God-man he is advanced to the highest favour with God the Father
