= Hypostatic union =

Christian theological concept

Hypostatic union (from the Greek: ὑπόστασις hypóstasis, 'person, subsistence') is a technical term in Christian theology employed in mainstream Christology to describe the union of Christ's human nature and divine nature in one composed hypostasis, or individual personhood.

In the most basic terms, the concept of hypostatic union states that Jesus Christ is both fully God and fully man. He is simultaneously perfectly divine and perfectly human, having two complete and distinct natures at once.

The Athanasian Creed recognized this doctrine and affirmed its importance by stating:

He is God from the essence of the Father, begotten before time; and he is human from the essence of his mother, born in time; completely God, completely human, with a rational soul and human flesh; equal to the Father as regards divinity, less than the Father as regards humanity. Although he is God and human, yet Christ is not two, but one. He is one, however, not by his divinity being turned into flesh, but by God's taking humanity to himself. He is one, certainly not by the blending of his essence, but by the unity of his person. For just as one human is both rational soul and flesh, so too the one Christ is both God and human.

== Hypostasis ==
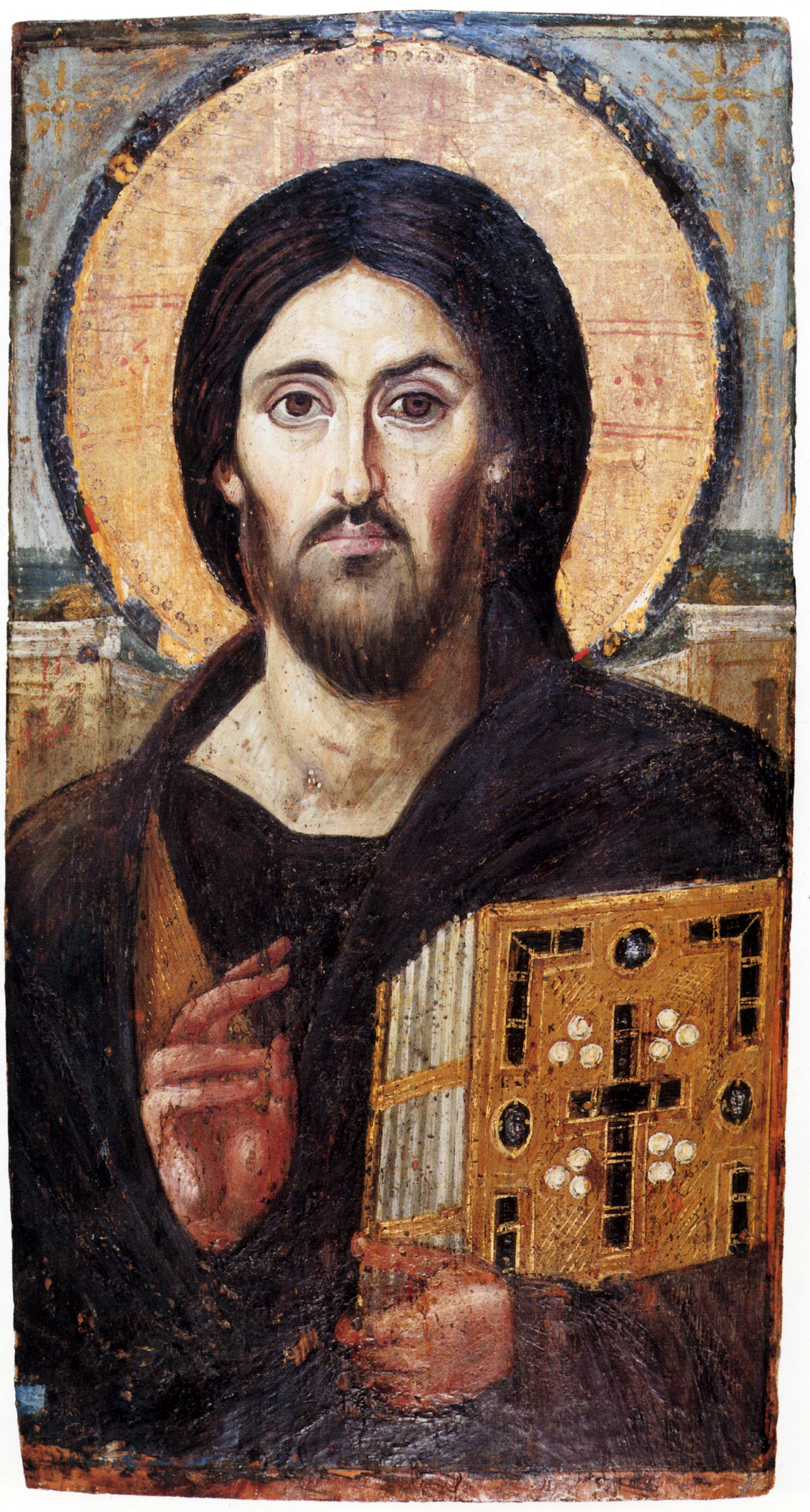
The oldest known icon of Christ Pantocrator at Saint Catherine's Monastery. The differing facial features on either side emphasize Jesus' human nature, as interpreted by Kurt Weitzmann.

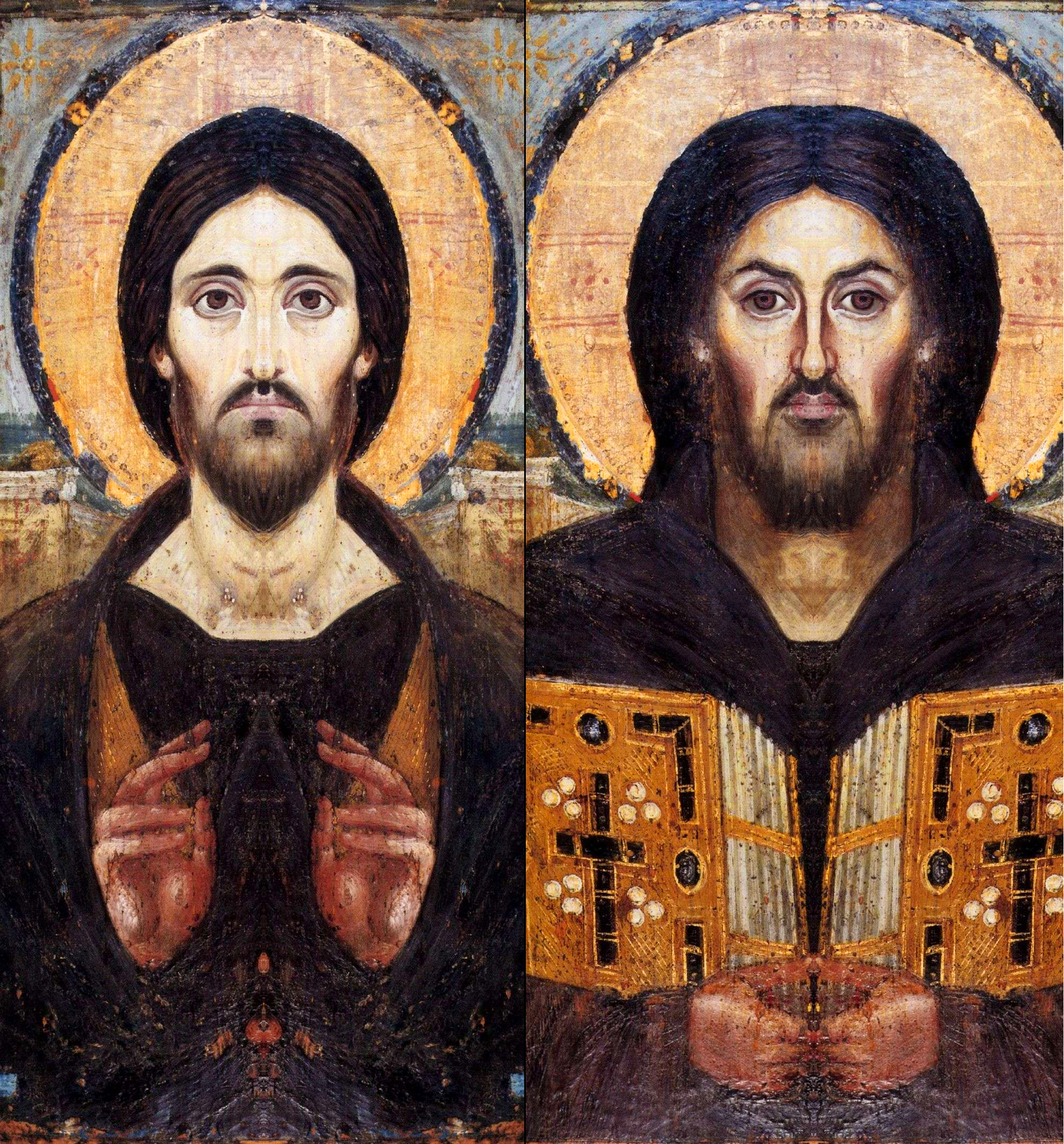
Composites of the two sides of the face.

The Greek term hypostasis (ὑπόστασις) had come into use as a technical term prior to the Christological debates of the late fourth and fifth centuries. In pre-Christian times, Greek philosophy (primarily Stoicism) used the word. Some occurrences of the term hypostasis in the New Testament foreshadow the later, technical understanding of the word. Although it can translate literally as "substance", this has been a cause of some confusion; accordingly the New American Standard Bible translates it as "subsistence". Hypostasis denotes an actual, concrete existence, in contrast to abstract categories such as Platonic ideals.

In Kierkegaard's Philosophical Fragments, the dual nature of Christ is explored as a paradox, i.e. as "the ultimate paradox", because God, understood as a perfectly good, perfectly wise, perfectly powerful being, fully became a human, in the Christian understanding of the term: burdened by sin, limited in goodness, knowledge, and understanding. This paradox can only be resolved, Kierkegaard believed, by a leap of faith away from one's understanding and reason towards belief in God.

As the precise nature of this union is held to defy finite human comprehension, the hypostatic union is also referred to by the alternative term "mystical union".

== Through history ==
Apollinaris of Laodicea was the first to use the term hypostasis in trying to understand the Incarnation. Apollinaris described the union of the divine and human in Christ as being of a single nature and having a single essence—a single hypostasis.

=== Council of Ephesus ===
In the 5th century, a dispute arose between Cyril of Alexandria and Nestorius in which Nestorius claimed that the term theotokos could not be used to describe Mary, the mother of Christ. Nestorius argued for two distinct substances or hypostases, of divinity and humanity, in Christ. He maintained that divinity could not be born from a human because the divine nature is unoriginate. The Council of Ephesus in 431, under the leadership of Cyril himself as well as the Ephesian bishop Memnon, labeled Nestorius a neo-adoptionist, implying that the man Jesus is divine and the Son of God only by grace and not by nature, and deposed him as a heretic. In his letter to Nestorius, Cyril used the term "hypostatic" (Greek, καθ᾽ ὑπόστασιν kath' hypóstasin) to refer to Christ's divine and human natures being one, saying, "We must follow these words and teachings, keeping in mind what 'having been made flesh' means .... We say ... that the Word, by having united to himself hypostatically flesh animated by a rational soul, inexplicably and incomprehensibly became man." Cyril also stressed on "μία φύσις τοῦ θεοῦ λόγου σεσαρκωμένη, meaning "one physis ["nature"] of the Word of God made flesh" (or "one physis of God the Word made flesh")"

=== Council of Chalcedon ===
The preeminent Antiochene theologian Theodore of Mopsuestia, contending against the monophysite heresy of Apollinarism, is believed to have taught that in Christ there are two natures (dyophysite), human and divine, and two corresponding hypostases (in the sense of "subject", "essence" but not "person") which co-existed. However, in Theodore's time the word hypostasis could be used in a sense synonymous with ousia (which clearly means "essence" rather than "person") as it had been used by Tatian and Origen. The Greek and Latin interpretations of Theodore's Christology have come under scrutiny since the recovery of his Catechetical Orations in the Syriac language.

In 451, the Ecumenical Council of Chalcedon promulgated the Chalcedonian Definition. It agreed with Theodore that there were two natures in the Incarnation. However, the Council of Chalcedon also insisted that hypostasis be used as it was in the Trinitarian definition: to indicate the person (prosopon) and not the nature as with Apollinaris.

=== Oriental Orthodox rejection of Chalcedonian definition ===
The Oriental Orthodox Churches, having rejected the Chalcedonian definition, were wrongly labelled as Eutychian Monophysites because they maintain that the incarnate Son has one united theanthropic nature (physis). However, Eutyches believed differently that Christ's human nature was lost in the divine, and therefore Christ had one singular nature consubstantial only with the Father, whereas Miaphysites have always affirmed that Christ's humanity is consubstantial with our own. Indeed, the term Miaphysite is a reference to Cyrillian Christology, which used the phrase μία φύσις τοῦ θεοῦ λόγου σεσαρκωμένη (mía phýsis toû theoû lógou sesarkōménē) ‘one incarnate nature of God the Word’ (later rejected by the Sixth Ecumentical Council). Thus the Miaphysite position maintains that although the nature of Christ is from two, it may only be referred to as one in its incarnate state because the natures always act in unity.

Likewise, the Chalcedonian "in two natures" formula (based on Colossians 2:9) was wrongly criticised as derived from and akin to a Nestorian Christology. Miaphysites also applied this label the Church of the East, which is Dyophysite like the Chalcedonians.

In 1989 and 1990, leaders from the Eastern Orthodox and Oriental Orthodox churches signed joint statements in an attempt to work towards reunification. Likewise the leaders of the Assyrian Church of the East, which venerates Nestorius and Theodore, in 1994 signed a joint agreement with leaders of the Catholic Church, acknowledging that their historical differences were over terminology rather than the intended meaning.

== See also ==
- Dyophysitism
- God-man (Christianity)
- Homoousion
- Person of Christ

== Sources ==
- Grillmeier, Aloys (1975) [1965]. Christ in Christian Tradition: From the Apostolic Age to Chalcedon (451) (2nd revised ed.). Louisville: Westminster John Knox Press. ISBN 9780664223014.
- Gorman, Michael (2017). Aquinas on the Metaphysics of the Hypostatic Union. Cambridge: Cambridge University Press. ISBN 9781107155329.
- Kuhn, Michael F. (2019). God is One: A Christian Defence of Divine Unity in the Muslim Golden Age. Carlisle: Langham Publishing. ISBN 9781783685776.
- Loon, Hans van (2009). The Dyophysite Christology of Cyril of Alexandria. Leiden-Boston: Basil BRILL. ISBN 978-9004173224.
- McLeod, Frederick G. (2010). "Theodore of Mopsuestia's Understanding of Two Hypostaseis and Two Prosopa Coinciding in One Common Prosopon". Journal of Early Christian Studies. 18 (3): 393–424. doi:10.1353/earl.2010.0011. S2CID 170594639.
- Meyendorff, John (1989). Imperial Unity and Christian Divisions: The Church 450–680 A.D. Crestwood, NY: St. Vladimir's Seminary Press. ISBN 9780881410563.
- Norris, Richard A., ed. (1980). The Christological Controversy. Minneapolis: Fortess Press. ISBN 9780800614119.
- Ramelli, Ilaria (2011). "Gregory of Nyssa's Trinitarian Theology in In Illud: Tunc et ipse filius. His Polemic against Arian Subordinationism and the ἀποκατάστασις". Gregory of Nyssa: The Minor Treatises on Trinitarian Theology and Apollinarism. Leiden-Boston: Brill. pp. 445–478. ISBN 9789004194144.
- Ramelli, Ilaria (2012). "Origen, Greek Philosophy, and the Birth of the Trinitarian Meaning of Hypostasis". The Harvard Theological Review. 105 (3): 302–350. doi:10.1017/S0017816012000120. JSTOR 23327679. S2CID 170203381.
- Turcescu, Lucian (1997). "Prosopon and Hypostasis in Basil of Caesarea's "Against Eunomius" and the Epistles". Vigiliae Christianae. 51 (4): 374–395. doi:10.2307/1583868. JSTOR 1583868.
- Weedman, Mark (2007). The Trinitarian Theology of Hilary of Poitiers. Leiden-Boston: Brill. ISBN 978-9004162242.
