= Aspect (religion) =

Religious term

Aspect is a term used across several religions to describe a particular manifestation or conception of a deity. Depending on the religion, these might be disjoint or overlapping parts, or methods of perceiving or conceptualizing the deity in a particular context.

== Overview ==
In Christianity, Trinitarianism (see Trinity) is the belief in God as three distinct Persons in one Divinity, all of One Being, not confounding the Substance nor dividing the Essence: as such it would be false and indeed heretical (Sabellianism), from the perspective of orthodox Christianity, to conceive of one God manifested in three separate aspects or modes.

In the Baháʼí Faith, this might be conceived as a Manifestation of God.

In some conceptions of Hinduism, Vishnu is seen as an aspect of Brahman.

In Sikhism, there are three distinct aspects: God as deity; God in relation to creation; and God in relation to man.

== See also ==
- Hypostasis (philosophy and religion)
