= Prosopon =

Person in Christian theology

Prosopon (Note: UK: /ˈprɒsəpɒn/, US: /prəˈsoʊ-/; from Ancient Greek: πρόσωπον prósōpon; plural: πρόσωπα prósōpa) is a Greek word used in Christianity that originally meant a 'face', 'countenance' , or 'mask', literally translating to "what is before the eyes". The term has a particular significance in theology when studying the Trinity and in Christology.

In the English language, the form prosopon is used mainly in scholarly works, related to theology, philosophy or history of religion, while it is also commonly translated as person, both in scholarly or non-scholarly writings. The term prosopon should not be confused with the term hypostasis, which is related to similar theological concepts, but differs in meaning.

The Latin term for prosopon, traditionally used in Western Christianity, and from which the English term person is derived, is persona.

== Overview ==
In Ancient Greek, term prosopon originally designated one's "face" or "mask". Actors in Greek theatre-productions wore specific physical masks on stage, in order to reveal their characters and emotional states to the audience.

The term prosopon had an important role in the development of theological terminology related to the Trinity and to Jesus. It was the subject of many theological debates and disputes, particularly during early centuries of Christian history.

The word prosopon is most commonly used for the self-manifestation of an individual hypostasis. Prosopon is the form in which hypostasis appears. Every hypostasis has its own prosopon: face or countenance. It gives expression to the reality of the hypostasis with its powers and characteristics.

Paul the Apostle uses the term when speaking of direct heart-felt apprehension of the face (prosopon) of Christ (2 Corinthians 4:6): "For it is the God who said, 'Let light shine out of darkness,' who has shone in our hearts to give the light of the knowledge of the glory of God in the face of Jesus Christ."

== Prosopon in Christian triadology ==
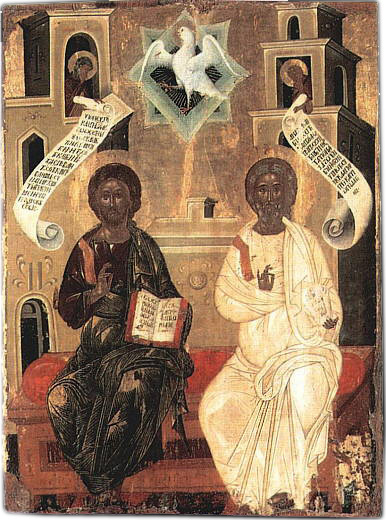
Cretan School icon representing three persons of the Trinity (San Giorgio Maggiore, Venice, 16th century)

In Christian triadology, the study of the Trinity, three specific theological concepts have emerged throughout history, in reference to number and mutual relations of divine persons:

- monoprosopic concept advocates that God has only one person;
- dyoprosopic concept advocates that God has two persons (Father and Son);
- triprosopic concept advocates that God has three persons (Father, Son and the Holy Spirit).

The most notable example of monoprosopic views is represented in ancient Sabellianism and its later variants, including teachings of some modern nontrinitarian Christian denominations, such as Oneness Pentecostalism.

== Prosopon in Christology ==
Within Christology, two specific theological concepts have emerged throughout history, in reference to the Person of Christ:

- monoprosopic concept (in Christology) advocates that Christ has only one person;
- dyoprosopic concept (in Christology) advocates that Christ has two persons (divine and human).

During the first half of the 5th century, some Antiochene theologians, including Theodore of Mopsuestia, and his disciple Nestorius, questioned the concept of hypostatic union of the two natures (divine and human) of Jesus, but accepted a more loosely defined concept of the prosopic union. Since their views on hypostatic union were seen as controversial, additional questions arose regarding their teachings on the prosopic union.

Theodore believed that incarnation of Jesus represents an indwelling of God different from the indwelling experienced by the Old Testament prophets or New Testament apostles. Jesus was viewed as a human being who shared the divine sonship of the Logos; the Logos united itself to Jesus from the moment of Jesus' conception. After the resurrection, the human Jesus and the Logos reveal that they have always been one prosopon.

Theodore addresses the prosopic union in applying prosopon to Christ the Logos. He accounts for two expressions of Christ – human and divine. Yet, he does not mean Christ achieved a unity of the two expressions through the formation of a third prosopon, but that one prosopon is produced by the Logos giving his own countenance to the assured man. He interprets the unity of God and man in Christ along the lines of the body-soul unity. Prosopon plays a special part in his interpretation of Christ. He rejected the Hypostasis concept – believing it to be a contradiction of Christ's true nature. He espoused that, in Christ, both body and soul had to be assumed. Christ assumed a soul and by the grace of God brought it to immutability and to a full dominion over the sufferings of the body.

Nestorius furthered Theodore's views on the prosopic union, claiming that prosopon is the "appearance" of the ousia (essence), and stating: "the prosopon makes known the ousia". On several instances, he emphasized the relation of each of the two natures (divine and human) with their respective appearances, using the term prosopon both in plural forms, and also as a singular designation for the prosopic union. Such terminological complexities and inconsistencies proved to be challenging not only for his contemporary critiques or followers, but also for later commentators and scholars.

The very suggestion of prosopic duality was challenging enough to cause heated debates among Christian theologians in the first half of the 5th century, resulting in official condemnation of such views. The Council of Ephesus of 431 affirmed the teaching of "One Person" of Jesus Christ, condemning all other teachings. The Council of Chalcedon in 451 reaffirmed the notion of One Person of Jesus Christ, formulating the famous Chalcedonian Definition with its "monoprosopic" (having one person) clauses, and in the same time explicitly denying the validity of "dyoprosopic" (having two persons) views.

== In Mandaeism ==
In the Mandaean scripture of the Ginza Rabba (in Right Ginza books 1 and 2.1), the face or countenance of Hayyi Rabbi is referred to as the "Great Countenance of Glory" (Classical Mandaic: ࡐࡀࡓࡑࡅࡐࡀ ࡓࡁࡀ ࡖࡏࡒࡀࡓࡀ, romanized: parṣupa rba ḏ-ʿqara; pronounced parṣufa in Modern Mandaic; also cognate with Classical Syriac: ܦܪܨܘܦܐ, romanized: prṣupa, lit. 'countenance', attested in the Peshitta including in Matthew 17:2). This Aramaic term is a borrowing from the Greek word prosopon.

== See also ==
- Divine countenance
- Person of Christ
- Nestorianism

== Sources ==
- Anastos, Milton V. (1962). "Nestorius Was Orthodox". Dumbarton Oaks Papers. 16: 117–140. doi:10.2307/1291160. JSTOR 1291160.
- Athanasopoulos, Constantinos; Schneider, Christoph, eds. (2013). Divine Essence and Divine Energies: Ecumenical Reflections on the Presence of God. Cambridge, UK: James Clarke & Co. ISBN 9780227900086.
- Behr, John (2011). The Case Against Diodore and Theodore: Texts and their Contexts. Oxford: Oxford University Press. ISBN 9780199569878.
- Braaten, Carl E. (1963). "Modern Interpretations of Nestorius". Church History. 32 (3): 251–267. doi:10.2307/3162772. JSTOR 3162772.
- Chesnut, Roberta C. (1978). "The Two Prosopa in Nestorius' Bazaar of Heracleides". The Journal of Theological Studies. 29 (2): 392–409. doi:10.1093/jts/XXIX.2.392. JSTOR 23958267.
- Daley, Brian E. (2009). "The Persons in God and the Person of Christ in Patristic Theology: An Argument for Parallel Development". God in Early Christian Thought. Leiden-Boston: Brill. pp. 323–350. ISBN 978-9004174122.
- González, Justo L. (2005). Essential Theological Terms. Louisville: Westminster John Knox Press. ISBN 9780664228101.
- Greer, Rowan A. (1966). "The Image of God and the Prosopic Union in Nestorius' Bazaar of Heraclides". Lux in Lumine: Essays to Honor W. Norman Pittenger. New York: Seabury Press. pp. 46–61.
- Florovsky, Georges (1987). The Eastern Fathers of the Fourth Century. Vaduz: Büchervertriebsanstalt. ISBN 9783905238075.
- Grillmeier, Aloys (1975) [1965]. Christ in Christian Tradition: From the Apostolic Age to Chalcedon (451) (2nd revised ed.). Louisville: Westminster John Knox Press. ISBN 9780664223014.
- Kalantzis, George (2008). "Is There Room for Two? Cyril's Single Subjectivity and the Prosopic Union". St. Vladimir's Theological Quarterly. 52 (1): 95–110.
- Kalantzis, George (2010). "Single Subjectivity and the Prosopic Union in Cyril of Alexandria and Theodore of Mopsuestia". Studia Patristica. 47: 59–64. ISBN 978-90-429-2374-4.
- Loon, Hans van (2009). The Dyophysite Christology of Cyril of Alexandria. Leiden-Boston: Basil BRILL. ISBN 978-9004173224.
- Manoussakis, John Panteleimon (2006). "Prosopon and Icon: Two Premodern Ways of Thinking God". After God: Richard Kearney and the Religious Turn in Continental Philosophy. New York: Fordham University Press. pp. 279–298. ISBN 978-0-8232-2532-3.
- McLeod, Frederick G. (2005). The Roles of Christ's Humanity in Salvation: Insights from Theodore of Mopsuestia. Washington: COA Press. ISBN 9780813213965.
- McLeod, Frederick G. (2009). Theodore of Mopsuestia. London: Routledge. ISBN 9781134079285.
- McLeod, Frederick G. (2010). "Theodore of Mopsuestia's Understanding of Two Hypostaseis and Two Prosopa Coinciding in One Common Prosopon". Journal of Early Christian Studies. 18 (3): 393–424. doi:10.1353/earl.2010.0011.
- Meyendorff, John (1989). Imperial Unity and Christian Divisions: The Church 450–680 A.D. Crestwood, NY: St. Vladimir's Seminary Press. ISBN 9780881410563.
- Nichols, Aidan (2010) [1992]. Rome and the Eastern Churches: A Study in Schism (2nd revised ed.). San Francisco: Ignatius Press. ISBN 9781586172824.
- Norris, Richard A., ed. (1980). The Christological Controversy. Minneapolis: Fortess Press. ISBN 9780800614119.
- Pásztori-Kupán, István (2006). Theodoret of Cyrus. London & New York: Routledge. ISBN 9781134391769.
- Ramelli, Ilaria (2011). "Gregory of Nyssa's Trinitarian Theology in In Illud: Tunc et ipse filius. His Polemic against Arian Subordinationism and the ἀποκατάστασις". Gregory of Nyssa: The Minor Treatises on Trinitarian Theology and Apollinarism. Leiden-Boston: Brill. pp. 445–478. ISBN 9789004194144.
- Ramelli, Ilaria (2012). "Origen, Greek Philosophy, and the Birth of the Trinitarian Meaning of Hypostasis". The Harvard Theological Review. 105 (3): 302–350. doi:10.1017/S0017816012000120. JSTOR 23327679.
- Reed, David A. (2014). "Then and Now: The Many Faces of Global Oneness Pentecostalism". The Cambridge Companion to Pentecostalism. New York: Cambridge University Press. pp. 52–70. ISBN 9781107007093.
- Spoerl, Kelley M. (1994). "Apollinarian Christology and the Anti-Marcellan Tradition". The Journal of Theological Studies. 45 (2): 545–568. doi:10.1093/jts/45.2.545. JSTOR 23967638.
- Toepel, Alexander (2014). "Zur Bedeutung der Begriffe Hypostase und Prosopon bei Babai dem Großen". Georgian Christian Thought and Its Cultural Context. Leiden-Boston: Brill, 2014. pp. 151–171. ISBN 978-90-04-26427-4.
- Turcescu, Lucian (1997). "Prosopon and Hypostasis in Basil of Caesarea's "Against Eunomius" and the Epistles". Vigiliae Christianae. 51 (4): 374–395. doi:10.2307/1583868. JSTOR 1583868.
- Weedman, Mark (2007). The Trinitarian Theology of Hilary of Poitiers. Leiden-Boston: Brill. ISBN 978-9004162242.
