= James Bethune-Baker =

British academic and theologian (1861–1951)

James Franklin Bethune-Baker FBA (23 August 1861 – 13 January 1951) was the Lady Margaret's Professor of Divinity at the University of Cambridge from 1911 to 1935.

Bethune-Baker was educated at King Edward's School, Birmingham, and Pembroke College, Cambridge. A Modern Churchman, he was known for his work on the person and writings of Nestorius. He was co-editor of the Journal of Theological Studies from 1904 to 1935. He was a Fellow of Pembroke College for sixty years. His funeral service took place in Pembroke College Chapel on 17 January 1951, but he was buried in the Ascension Parish Burial Ground, Cambridge. He was a cousin of Arthur Christopher Benson, who is also buried in the Ascension Parish Burial Ground.

He was married to Edith Bethune-Baker, née Furneaux Jordan, a welfare campaigner, who was born in 1862. Their son Arthur Bethune-Baker was a contemporary of Charles Hamilton Sorley at Marlborough College, but he died while still at school, aged sixteen.

== Selected works ==
- Influence of Christianity on War, 1888
- The Meaning of Homoousios in the "Constantinopolitan" Creed, 1901.
- An Introduction to the Early History of Christian Doctrine, to the Time of the Council of Chalcedon, 1903 (revised 1933)
- Bethune-Baker, James F. (1908). Nestorius and His Teaching: A Fresh Examination of the Evidence. Cambridge: Cambridge University Press. ISBN 9781107432987.
- The Faith of the Apostles' Creed: An Essay in Adjustment Of Belief and Faith, 1918.
