= Hypostasis (philosophy and religion) =

Underlying state or underlying substance

Hypostasis (plural: hypostases), from the Greek ὑπόστασις (hypóstasis), is the underlying, fundamental state or substance that supports all of reality. It is not the same as the concept of a substance. In Neoplatonism, the hypostasis of the soul, the intellect (nous) and "the one" was addressed by Plotinus. In Christian theology, the Holy Trinity consists of three hypostases: that of the Father, that of the Son, and that of the Holy Spirit.

== Ancient Greek philosophy ==
Pseudo-Aristotle used "hypostasis" in the sense of material substance.

Neoplatonists argue that beneath the surface phenomena that present themselves to our senses are three higher spiritual principles (or hypostases): each one more sublime than the preceding. The originator of this metaphysical 'system of three hypostases' was the third century Platonist philosopher Plotinus, who based it upon his understanding of the writings of Plato. According to Plotinus, these three "hypostases" are the Soul, the Intellect, and the One.

== Christian theology ==
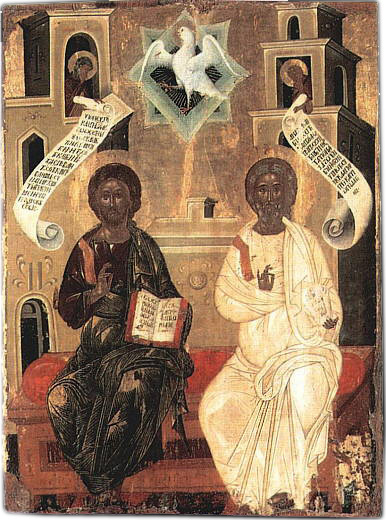
Italo-Greek icon, representing the Holy Trinity, Venice (16th century)

The term hypostasis has particular significance in Christian theology; particularly in Christian triadology—the study of the Christian doctrine of the trinity—as well as Christology (study of Jesus as Christ).

=== Triadology ===
In Christian triadology, three specific theological concepts have emerged throughout history in reference to the number and interrelationship of the hypostases:

==== Monohypostatic ====
The Monohypostatic concept advocates that the Father, Son, and Spirit are one single hypostasis in a single ousia—meaning that the Father, Son, and Spirit are a single Person. Historically, there were variations of this view:

- The second-century Monarchians believed that "Father" and "Son" are two names for the same God.
- In the third century, Sabellius taught that the Father, Son, and Spirit are three co-existent persons (prosopa) of one hypostasis.

Among the pre-Nicene Church Fathers, "Dionysius of Rome ... said that it is wrong to divide the divine monarchy 'into three ... separated hypostases ... people who hold this in effect produce three gods'."

Sabellius would sympathize with that same logic, stressing the idea that God was one hypostasis. According to scholar Johann Lorenz von Mosheim, Sabellius taught three co-existent divine things in the one divine Person. Johann Lorenz von Mosheim says “It appears from these comparisons [the sun and the man] that Sabellius did not believe the Father, Son, and Holy Spirit were three names for the same thing... but rather three distinct things which exist together in the one Divine Person.”

St. Basil would explain “According to Sabellius, there is in God only one hypostasis but three prosopa...” The Greeks would eventually move to saying “three hypostases” [paraphrased summary of his Homily 24 by sch. Mosheim] whilst the Latins remained professing Una substantia, tres personae. This would cause tensions as the West continued to use the language which today would be translated as “one substance, three persons” whilst the Greeks under Cappadocian rectification would say "three hypostases" which many note would be accused of tritheism.

Opponents of Sabellius such as Hippolytus of Rome would use the same language as Sabellius. “While I will not say that there are two gods—but rather one—I will say there are two persons (prosopa); and that a third economy is the grace of the Holy Spirit. For though the Father is one, there are two persons (prosopa)—because there is the Son as well: and the third too—the Holy Spirit.”

As a result, the heresy of Sabellianism would be attributed to the West following the controversy, with the Greeks fearing the term 'prosopon' (or the plural 'prosopa') which in Greek meant 'face' or 'mask', would imply Sabellianism. And the West fearing referring to the persons as 'hypostases' would imply three essences and beings (tritheism).

In the fourth century, Sabellians (such as Eustathius and Marcellus,), Alexander, Athanasius, and the Western Church taught a single hypostasis in God. The "clear inference from [Athanasius'] usage" is that "there is only one hypostasis in God." Some leading scholars claim that even the Nicene Creed professes a 'one hypostasis' theology.

==== Dyohypostatic ====
The Dyohypostatic concept advocates that God has two hypostases (Father and Son); When the fourth-century Controversy began, the focus was only on the Son, not on the Holy Spirit. Later in that century, some groups, such as the Macedonians, accepted the Son as fully divine but not the Holy Spirit. This is why in AD 381, during the First Council of Constantinople, the Nicene Creed was revised to be explicit, the final word, on the deity of the Holy Spirit.

==== Trihypostatic ====
The Trihypostatic concept advocates that God has three of these spaces (Father, Son and the Holy Spirit), each having the same ousia—that is, one Divine nature or true being, substance, being, existence. After Sabellianism was condemned in the third century, Origen's three-hypostases view dominated. The Eusebians (traditionally but erroneously called 'Arians') believed in three hypostases. The leaders of the Eusebians were Eusebius of Caesarea and Eusebius of Nicomedia. In this view, Father, Son, and Spirit are three distinct minds. For example, the Eastern Dedication Creed says, "They are three in hypostasis but one in agreement." (Hanson, p. 286) "Agreement" implies distinct minds.

There were also variations of the 'three hypostases' view. "What is conventionally regarded as the key-word in the Creed homoousion, falls completely out of the controversy very shortly after the Council of Nicaea and is not heard of for over twenty years." (Hanson Lecture) Athanasius re-introduced the term into the debate in the 350s, some 30 years after Nicaea. This caused the Eusebians to divide into various views. Some said the Father's and Son's substances are unlike (heterousios). Others said their substances are similar (homoiousios). Still others refused to talk about substance (the Homoians).

The Cappadocian fathers were the first pro-Nicenes to believe in three hypostases. For example, Basil of Caesarea said that the Son's statements that he does the will of the Father "is not because He lacks deliberate purpose or power of initiation" but because "His own will is connected in indissoluble union with the Father."

This dispute about the number of hypostases in God was at the core of the 'Arian' Controversy. Both traditional Trinity doctrine and the Arians taught three distinct hypostases in the Godhead. The difference is that, in the Trinity doctrine, they are one also identified as a single Being.

=== Hypostasis and ousia ===
Hypostasis is the individual aspect of ousia, this means ousia is the parent characteristic that is shared by the hypostasis under it. Ousia can be shared by numerous hypostases, as hypostasis is the individual expression of that ousia just how ego is an expression of the underlying soul. In this case it's clear to see that the ego and the soul are seemingly different as well as the same thing for the ego is not without the soul, they can however coexist. Ousia is the nature of that existence and all things that exist have ousia, as it's the nature of that existence in the way that it exists. Ousia is what makes a rock a rock and hypostasis is the various kinds of rocks; ousia is the form as well as nature of particles that construct an entity in the case of physical phenomena. On the other hand for spiritual phenomena it's the level of presence & creative force that differentiates one ousia from another. Like it has been said earlier this nature of existence(ousia) maybe shared by various hypostasis or instances of ousia.

Hypostasis is not the same as type or part, a Hypostasis holds all the nature described by its ousia. This means the ousia is equally possessed by each hypostasis & in that sense they are all the same. Each hypostasis is one as well as many at once. This is because all of them hold the same ousia, the difference is in their expressions of it.

==== Greek philosophy ====
These terms originate from Greek philosophy, where they essentially had the same meaning, namely, the fundamental reality that supports all else. In a Christian context, this concept may refer to God or the Ultimate Reality.

==== The Bible ====
The Bible never refers to God's ousia and only once to God's hypostasis (Hebrews 1:3). In Hebrews 1:3, it is not clear whether hypostasis refers to God's nature or His entire 'Person' (hypostasis) and is variously translated.

==== Early Church Fathers ====
In early Christian writings, hypostasis was used to denote 'being' or 'substantive reality' and was not always distinguished in meaning from terms like ousia ('essence'), substantia ('substance') or qnoma (specific term in Syriac Christianity). It was used in this way by Tatian and Origen. Tertullian, writing in Latin, did not use the Greek terms hypostasis and ousia but he did use the related term substantia.

==== Nicene Creed ====
The Nicene Creed of 325, in one of its anathemas, used the terms hypostasis and ousia:

"But as for those ... who assert that the Son of God is of a different hypostasis or substance [ousia] ... these the Catholic and apostolic Church anathematizes." (Early Church Texts)

These terms were not used by any previous creed. At the time of the Nicene Creed, different people used these terms differently. Many used them as synonyms. Importantly, Athanasius, the main custodian of the Nicene Creed, also used these terms as synonyms. It is, therefore, not surprising that one of the anathemas in the Creed seems to use these terms as synonyms. However, since they were used as synonyms, the Early Church Texts, which translates ousia as 'substance' is misleading. As mentioned below, the meanings of these terms changed during the Arian Controversy and what Early Church Texts does is to apply the later developed meanings of these terms to the Nicene Creed:

[The two terms] "did not mean, and should not be translated, 'person' and 'substance', as they were used when at last the confusion was cleared up and these two distinct meanings were permanently attached to these words."

==== Cappadocian Fathers ====
As stated, when the Arian controversy began and for much of the fourth century, hypostasis and ousia were synonyms. However, later in that century, a clear distinction was made between the two terms. The three Cappadocian Fathers, Basil of Caesarea (330 to 379), Gregory of Nazianzus (329 to 389), and Gregory of Nyssa (335 to about 395) who was one of Basil's younger brothers, are traditionally credited for being the first to make a clear distinction between ousia and hypostasis, particularly Basil of Caesarea, namely in his letters 214 (375 AD) and 236 (376 AD)

However, Arius and Asterius were two Eusebians who made that distinction much earlier. However, Basil of Caesarea was the first pro-Nicene to make that distinction. While Basil was a three-hypostasis theologian, Athanasius and the earlier pro-Nicene theologians were one-hypostasis theologians and did not need a distinction between hypostasis and ousia.

However, the Cappadocians did not yet understand God as one undivided ousia (substance), as in the Trinity doctrine. They said that the Father, Son, and Spirit have exactly the same type of substance, but each has his own substance. Basil began his career as theologian as a Homoiousian. As such, he believed that the Son's substance is similar to the Father's, meaning two distinct hypostases. Later, after he had accepted homoousios (same substance), he retained the idea of two distinct hypostases:

He says that in his own view 'like in respect of ousia' (the slogan of the party of Basil of Ancyra) was an acceptable formula, provided that the word 'unalterably' was added to it, for then it would be equivalent to homoousios." "Basil himself prefers homoousios." "Basil has moved away from but has not completely repudiated his origins.

This means that Basil understood homoousios in a generic sense of two beings with the same type of substance, rather than two beings sharing one single substance. Consequently, he explained that the distinction between ousia and hypostases is the same as that between the general and the particular; as, for instance, between the animal and the particular man.

"In the DSS [Basil] discusses the idea that the distinction between the Godhead and the Persons is that between an abstract essence, such as humanity, and its concrete manifestations, such as man."

Basil "argued that [homoousios] was preferable because it actually excluded identity of hypostases. This, with the instances which we have already seen in which Basil compared the relation of hypostasis to ousia in the Godhead to that of particular to general, or of a man to 'living beings', forms the strongest argument for Harnack's hypothesis." "Harnack ... argued that Basil and all the Cappadocians interpreted homoousios only in a 'generic' sense ... that unity of substance was turned into equality of substance."

==== Doctrine of the Trinity ====
The terms ousia and hypostasis are foundational in the Trinity doctrine. Hanson described the traditional Trinity doctrine as follows:

"The champions of the Nicene faith ... developed a doctrine of God as a Trinity, as one substance or ousia who existed as three hypostases, three distinct realities or entities (I refrain from using the misleading word 'Person'), three ways of being or modes of existing as God."

Hanson explains hypostases as 'ways of being' or 'modes of existing' but says that the term 'person' is misleading. As the term is used in English, each 'person' is a distinct entity with his or her own mind and will. This is not equivalent to the concept of hypostasis in the Trinity doctrine because, in that doctrine, the Father, Son, and Holy Spirit are a single Being with a single mind. For example, Karl Rahner, a leading catholic scholar, said:

"The element of consciousness ... does not belong to it [the Person] in our context [the official doctrine of the {Catholic} Church]." "But there exists in God only one power, one will, only one self-presence. ... Hence self-awareness is not a moment which distinguishes the divine "persons" one from the other."

==== Later developments ====
Consensus was not achieved without some confusion at first in the minds of Western theologians since in the West the vocabulary was different. Many Latin-speaking theologians understood hypo-stasis as 'sub-stantia' (substance); thus when speaking of three hypostases in the Godhead, they may have suspected three substances or tritheism. However, after the mid-fifth-century Council of Chalcedon, the word came to be contrasted with ousia and was used to mean 'individual reality', especially in the trinitarian and Christological contexts. The Christian concept of the Trinity is often described as being one God existing in three distinct hypostases/personae/persons.

=== Nature of Christ ===
Within Christology, two specific theological concepts have emerged throughout history, in reference to the Hypostasis of Christ:

- Monohypostatic concept advocates that Christ has only one hypostasis;
- Dyohypostatic concept advocates that Christ has two hypostases (divine and human).

=== John Calvin's views ===
John Calvin wrote: "The word ὑπόστασις which, by following others, I have rendered substance, denotes not, as I think, the being or essence of the Father, but his person; for it would be strange to say that the essence of God is impressed on Christ, as the essence of both is simply the same. But it may truly and fitly be said that whatever peculiarly belongs to the Father is exhibited in Christ, so that he who knows him knows what is in the Father. And in this sense do the orthodox fathers take this term, hypostasis, considering it to be threefold in God, while the essence (οὐσία) is simply one. Hilary everywhere takes the Latin word substance for person. But though it be not the Apostle's object in this place to speak of what Christ is in himself, but of what he is really to us, yet he sufficiently confutes the Asians and Sabellians; for he claims for Christ what belongs to God alone, and also refers to two distinct persons, as to the Father and the Son. For we hence learn that the Son is one God with the Father, and that he is yet in a sense distinct from him, so that a subsistence or person belongs to both."

== See also ==
- Aspect (religion)
- Haecceity – a term used by the followers of Duns Scotus to refer to that which formally distinguishes one thing from another with a common nature
- Hypokeimenon
- Hypostatic union
- Hypostatic abstraction
- Instantiation principle
- Kalyptos in Gnosticism
- Leontius of Byzantium (enhypostasia)
- Noema – a similar term used by Edmund Husserl
- Prakṛti – a similar term found in Hinduism
- Principle of individuation
- Prosopon or persona
- Reification (fallacy)
- Substance theory

== Sources ==
- Anton, John P. (1977). "Some Logical Aspects of the Concept of Hypostasis in Plotinus". The Review of Metaphysics. 31 (2): 258–271. JSTOR 20127050.
- Bulgakov, Sergius (2009). The Burning Bush: On the Orthodox Veneration of the Mother of God. Grand Rapids, MI: William B. Eerdmans Publishing. ISBN 978-0802845740.
- Daley, Brian E. (2009). "The Persons in God and the Person of Christ in Patristic Theology: An Argument for Parallel Development". God in Early Christian Thought. Leiden & Boston: Brill. pp. 323–350. ISBN 978-9004174122.
- Kuhn, Michael F. (2019). God is One: A Christian Defence of Divine Unity in the Muslim Golden Age. Carlisle: Langham Publishing. ISBN 978-1783685776.
- Lienhard, Joseph T. (1993). "The Arian Controversy: Some Categories Reconsidered". Doctrines of God and Christ in the Early Church. New York and London: Garland Publishing. pp. 87–109. ISBN 978-0815310693.
- Loon, Hans van (2009). The Dyophysite Christology of Cyril of Alexandria. Leiden & Boston: Brill. ISBN 978-9004173224.
- McGuckin, John Anthony, ed. (2011). The Encyclopedia of Eastern Orthodox Christianity. Vol. 1. Malden, MA: Wiley-Blackwell. ISBN 9781405185394.
- McLeod, Frederick G. (2010). "Theodore of Mopsuestia's Understanding of Two Hypostaseis and Two Prosopa Coinciding in One Common Prosopon". Journal of Early Christian Studies. 18 (3): 393–424. doi:10.1353/earl.2010.0011. S2CID 170594639.
- Meyendorff, John (1983) [1974]. Byzantine Theology: Historical Trends and Doctrinal Themes (2nd revised ed.). New York: Fordham University Press. ISBN 978-0823209675.
- Meyendorff, John (1989). Imperial Unity and Christian Divisions: The Church 450–680 A.D. Crestwood, NY: St. Vladimir's Seminary Press. ISBN 978-0881410563.
- Owens, Joseph (1951). The Doctrine of Being in the Aristotelian Metaphysics: A Study in the Greek Background of Mediaeval Thought. Toronto: Pontifical Institute of Mediaeval Studies.
- Pásztori-Kupán, István (2006). Theodoret of Cyrus. London & New York: Routledge. ISBN 978-1134391769.
- Ramelli, Ilaria (2012). "Origen, Greek Philosophy, and the Birth of the Trinitarian Meaning of Hypostasis". The Harvard Theological Review. 105 (3): 302–350. doi:10.1017/S0017816012000120. JSTOR 23327679. S2CID 170203381.
- Toepel, Alexander (2014). "Zur Bedeutung der Begriffe Hypostase und Prosopon bei Babai dem Großen". Georgian Christian Thought and Its Cultural Context. Leiden & Boston: Brill. pp. 151–171. ISBN 978-9004264274.
- Turcescu, Lucian (1997). "Prosopon and Hypostasis in Basil of Caesarea's "Against Eunomius" and the Epistles". Vigiliae Christianae. 51 (4): 374–395. doi:10.2307/1583868. JSTOR 1583868.
- Weedman, Mark (2007). The Trinitarian Theology of Hilary of Poitiers. Leiden & Boston: Brill. ISBN 978-9004162242.
