= Lucian Turcescu =

Canadian theologian

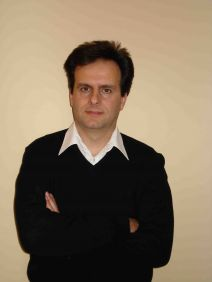
- Born: 1966 (age 59–60); Piteşti, Romania

Academic background
- Education: University of Toronto

Academic work
- Discipline: Theology
- Institutions: Concordia University; St. Francis Xavier University

Lucian Turcescu (born 1966) is a Romanian-born Canadian professor of theology at Concordia University in Montreal, Quebec, Canada.

== Education ==
He obtained his Doctor of Philosophy degree in theology from the University of Toronto in 1999. Turcescu taught for six years at St. Francis Xavier University in Nova Scotia, where he became an associate professor and chair of the Religious Studies Department. In 2005, he was recruited in the Department of Theological Studies at Concordia University, where he later was promoted to Full Professor and served as Department Chair between 2011-2016.

== Ideas ==
Turcescu has done research, published, and taught in several areas, including religion and politics, early Christianity, and ecumenism. One of his main ideas is that there was no concept of person before the fourth century CE, when Christian theologians (such as the Cappadocian Fathers) had to clarify what exactly they meant by one God in three persons. Another of his ideas is that modern theologians, such as the influential Metropolitan John Zizioulas of Pergamon, have not understood the fourth-century concept of person properly and instead applied to it modern existentialist and personalist readings (e.g., the difference between person and individual). He is also a proponent of the idea that functional democracies do not necessarily require the separation between church and state. Most of his research was supported by the Social Sciences and Humanities Research Council of Canada.

== Author ==
He authored or co-authored several dozen peer-reviewed articles which have been published in journals such as Communist and Post-Communist Studies, Europe-Asia Studies, East European Politics and Societies, Problems of Post-Communism, Religion, State and Society, Modern Theology, Journal of Ecumenical Studies, and Vigiliae Christianae.

He organized international colloquia on "Religion and Politics in Eastern Europe" (Iaşi, Romania, 2005) and on "The Reception and Interpretation of the Bible in Late Antiquity" (Concordia University, 2006). He is Past President of the Canadian Society of Patristic Studies (2004–2008), and an Associate Editor of the Journal of Ecumenical Studies since 2004.

Turcescu served as a member of the board of directors, Canadian Corporation for Studies in Religion, and the corporation's combined program director (1999–2002).

== Publications ==
Books:

- Lucian Turcescu and Lavinia Stan, eds., Churches, Memory and Justice in Post-communism. Palgrave Macmillan, 2021. ISBN 978-3-030-56063-8
- Lucian Turcescu and Lavinia Stan, eds., Church Reckoning with Communism in Post-1989 Romania. Lexington Books, an imprint of Rowman & Littlefield, 2021. ISBN 978-1-4985-8027-4.
- Lavinia Stan and Lucian Turcescu, eds., Justice, Memory and Redress in Romania: New Insights. Cambridge Scholars Publishing, 2017. ISBN 978-1-4438-3152-9.
- Lavinia Stan and Lucian Turcescu, Church, State and Democracy in Expanding Europe. Oxford University Press, 2011. ISBN 978-0-19-533710-5.
- Lavinia Stan and Lucian Turcescu, eds., 1989–2009: Incredibila aventura a democratiei dupa comunism (in Romanian). Iasi: Editura Institutul European, 2010). ISBN 978-973-611-657-5.
- Lorenzo DiTommaso and Lucian Turcescu, eds., The Reception and Interpretation of the Bible in Late Antiquity: Proceedings of the Montreal Colloquium in Honour of Charles Kannengiesser, 11-13 October 2006, Leiden: Brill, 2008. ISBN 978-90-04-16715-5.
- Lavinia Stan and Lucian Turcescu, Religion and Politics in Post-communist Romania, Oxford University Press, 2007. ISBN 0-19-530853-0 Romanian translation: Lavinia Stan si Lucian Turcescu, Religie si politica in Romania postcomunista (Curtea Veche, 2010).
- Lucian Turcescu, Gregory of Nyssa and the Concept of Divine Persons, Oxford University Press, 2005. ISBN 0-19-517425-9
- Lucian Turcescu, editor, Dumitru Stăniloae: tradition and modernity in theology, Iași, Romania; Palm Beach, Fla.: Center for Romanian Studies, 2002. ISBN 973-9432-29-8

Chapters:

- Lavinia Stan and Lucian Turcescu, "Religion and Politics in Post-Communist Romania," in Quo Vadis Eastern Europe? Religion, State, Society after Communism, ed. by Ines A. Murzaku (Ravenna: Longo Editore, 2009), 221-35.
- Lavinia Stan and Lucian Turcescu, "The Romanian Greek Catholic Church after 1989," in Stephanie Mahieu and Vlad Naumescu, ed., Churches In-Between: Greek Catholic Churches in Postsocialist Europe (Berlin: LIT Verlag, 2008), 99-109.
- Lucian Turcescu, "The Concept of Persons in Gregory of Nyssa and Gregory of Nazianzus," in Matthieu Cassin et al., eds., Grégoire de Nysse: La Bible dans la construction de son discours. Actes du colloque de Paris, 9-10 février 2007 (Paris: Études augustiniennes, 2008), 287-299.
- Lucian Turcescu, "Biblical Hermeneutics in Gregory of Nyssa's De opificio hominis," in L. DiTommaso and L. Turcescu, eds., The Reception and Interpretation of the Bible in Late Antiquity (Leiden: E. J. Brill, 2008) 511-526.
- Lucian Turcescu, "Dumitru Staniloae," Commentary and Original Source materials in English translation in The Teachings of Modern Orthodoxy on Law, Politics, and Human Nature, eds. John Witte, Jr. and Frank Alexander (New York: Columbia Univ. Press, 2007) 295-342.

Select Articles:

- Lavinia Stan and Lucian Turcescu, "The Devil's Confessors: Priests, Communists, Spies, and Informers," East European Politics and Societies, 19 (2005), no. 4, 655-685. doi:10.1177/0888325404272454
- Lavinia Stan and Lucian Turcescu, "Pulpits, Ballots and Party Cards: Religion and Elections in Romania," Religion, State and Society, 33, no. 4 (December 2005) 347-366.
- Lavinia Stan and Lucian Turcescu, "Religious Education in Romania," Communist and Post-Communist Studies, 38, no. 3 (September 2005), 381-401.
- Lavinia Stan and Lucian Turcescu, "Religion, Politics and Sexuality in Romania," Europe-Asia Studies, 57, no. 2 (March 2005), 291-310.
- Lavinia Stan and Lucian Turcescu, "Politicians, Intellectuals and Academic Integrity in Romania," Problems of Post-Communism, 51, no. 4 (July/August 2004), 12-24.
- Lavinia Stan and Lucian Turcescu, "Church-state Conflict in the Republic of Moldova: The Bessarabian Metropolitanate," Communist and Post-Communist Studies, 36, no. 4 (December 2003), 443-465.
- Lavinia Stan and Lucian Turcescu, "The Romanian Orthodox Church and Post-Communist Democratization," Europe-Asia Studies, 58, no. 2 (2002), 1467–1488. Republished in East European Perspectives, 3, no. 4 (22 February 2001), and 3, no. 5 (7 March 2001).
- Lavinia Stan and Lucian Turcescu, "Politics, national symbols and the Romanian Orthodox Cathedral," Europe-Asia Studies, 8 (2006), 1119–1139. OCLC 90228854
