= Chalcedonian schism =

Break of communion between the Eastern and Oriental Orthodox churches

- Spectrum of 5th to 7th century Christological views
- Date: 1 November 451 – present (1575 years and 14 days)
- Type: Christian schism
- Cause: Council of Chalcedon; Dispute over whether Christ has one nature or two natures
- Participants: Pope Leo I; Pope Dioscorus I
- Outcome: Mutual separation of the Oriental Orthodox Churches from the Chalcedonian Christianity

The Chalcedonian schism, also known as the Monophysite schism, (Note: "Monophysite" is a modern, often pejorative term for non-Chalcedonians, who were known at the time as διακρινόμενοι (hesitants) or ἀποσχισταί (dissidents). The Oriental Orthodox Churches prefer the term "miaphysite" to describe their Christology, partly because of the slight difference in meaning between Greek μόνος (only one) and μία (one), and partly to allude to Cyril of Alexandria's formula "μία φύσις τοῦ θεοῦ λόγου σεσαρκωμένη".) is the break of communion between the Oriental Orthodox Churches and the Chalcedonian Christianity (which later gave both the Eastern Orthodox Church and the Catholic Church) in the aftermath of the Council of Chalcedon. Although the bishops at Chalcedon greatly respected Cyril of Alexandria and used his writings as a benchmark for orthodoxy, opponents of the council believed that the Chalcedonian Definition, which states that Christ is "acknowledged in Two Natures", was too close to Nestorianism and contradicts Cyril's formula "one nature of God the Word incarnate". (Note: In Cyril's first letter to Succensus, Bishop of Diocaesarea, he wrote "After the union has occurred, however, we do not divide the natures from one another, nor do we sever the one and indivisible into two sons, but we say that there is One Son, and as the holy Fathers have stated: One Incarnate Nature of God The Word." (Greek: Μετὰ μὲν τοι τὴν ἕνωσιν οὐ διαιροῦμεν τάς φύσεις, ἀλλ’ ἕνα φαμὲν Υἱόν, καὶ ὡς οἱ πατέρες εἰρήκασιν, μίαν φύσιν τοῦ Θεοῦ Λόγου σεσαρκωμένη).) The Council had also deposed the Pope of Alexandria, Dioscorus, but his supporters continued to consider him their rightful Pope, refusing to recognise the council-appointed Proterius.

The anti-Chalcedonian strongholds were in Egypt, Palestine and later Syria. Over the next century, their communities gradually separated from the official church of the Byzantine Empire, eventually becoming the Oriental Orthodox Churches. The imperial government made many attempts to mend the schism, generally by trying to compromise between the two positions, but these attempts only created further heresies and schisms. The Arab conquests of the Levant and of Egypt in the 7th century fossilised the schism, but ecumenical dialogue between Chalcedonian and non-Chalcedonian Christians has been renewed since the 20th century.

== Background ==
=== Council of Ephesus ===
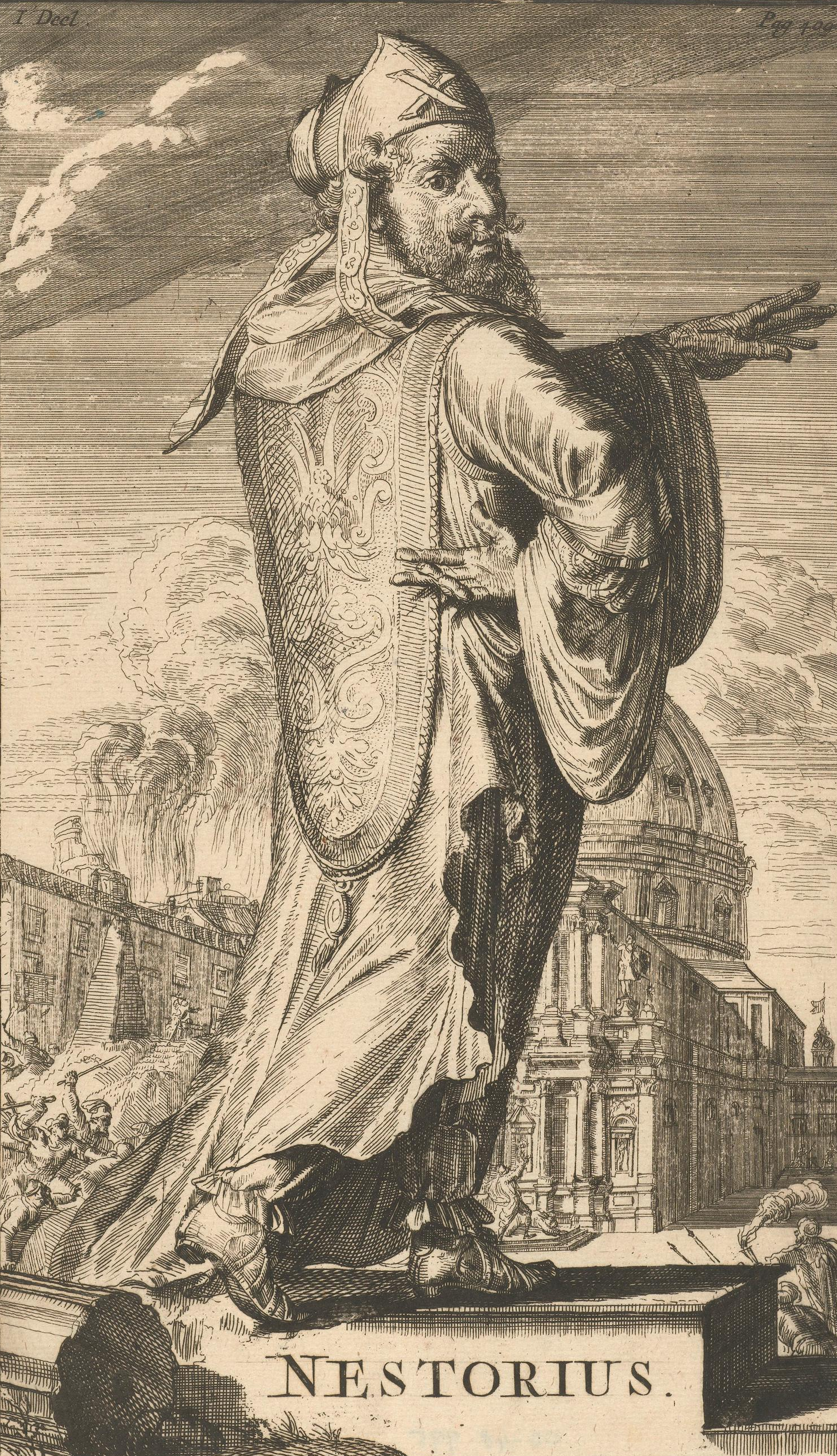
The Christology ascribed to Nestorius: that Christ contains two hypostases, one human and one divine. This was condemned by Cyril and the Council of Ephesus, who argued that Christ's two hypostases (divine and human) united to form one composite hypostasis after the union.

Leading up to the 430s, the theological Schools of Alexandria and of Antioch had been developing slightly different views on Christology. Antiochene theologians such as Theodore of Mopsuestia and Theodoret of Cyrrhus had a "Word-man" Christology, or "Christology from below", which placed more emphasis on Christ's humanity and free will, and the distinction of his two natures. Their view was that Jesus, the man (homo assumptus) to whom God the Word was conjoined, atoned for the sins of mankind through his perfect life and his sacrifice on the cross, after which God raised him up to heaven "as a pledge of the salvation of all humanity". In contrast, Alexandrian theologians such as Athanasius and Cyril of Alexandria had a "Word-flesh" Christology, or "Christology from above", which placed more emphasis on Christ's divinity and its absolute unity with his humanity. In their view, the Word became flesh, not merely by indwelling a man but through a hypostatic union. He then "tasted death in the flesh" on the cross and rose from the dead, thus saving humanity not by a moral example but by being incarnate for our sake, since "what is not assumed is not saved".

Additionally, the See of Rome's interpretation of its relationship to the other patriarchates (Constantinople, Alexandria, and Antioch (Note: Jerusalem was not a patriarchate until 451.)) was increasingly diverging from their own. While the other patriarchates saw themselves as colleagues based on their autocephalous relationship to each other, the Popes of Rome believed that their position as "first among equals" and as the successors of Saint Peter gave them authority over the entire church.

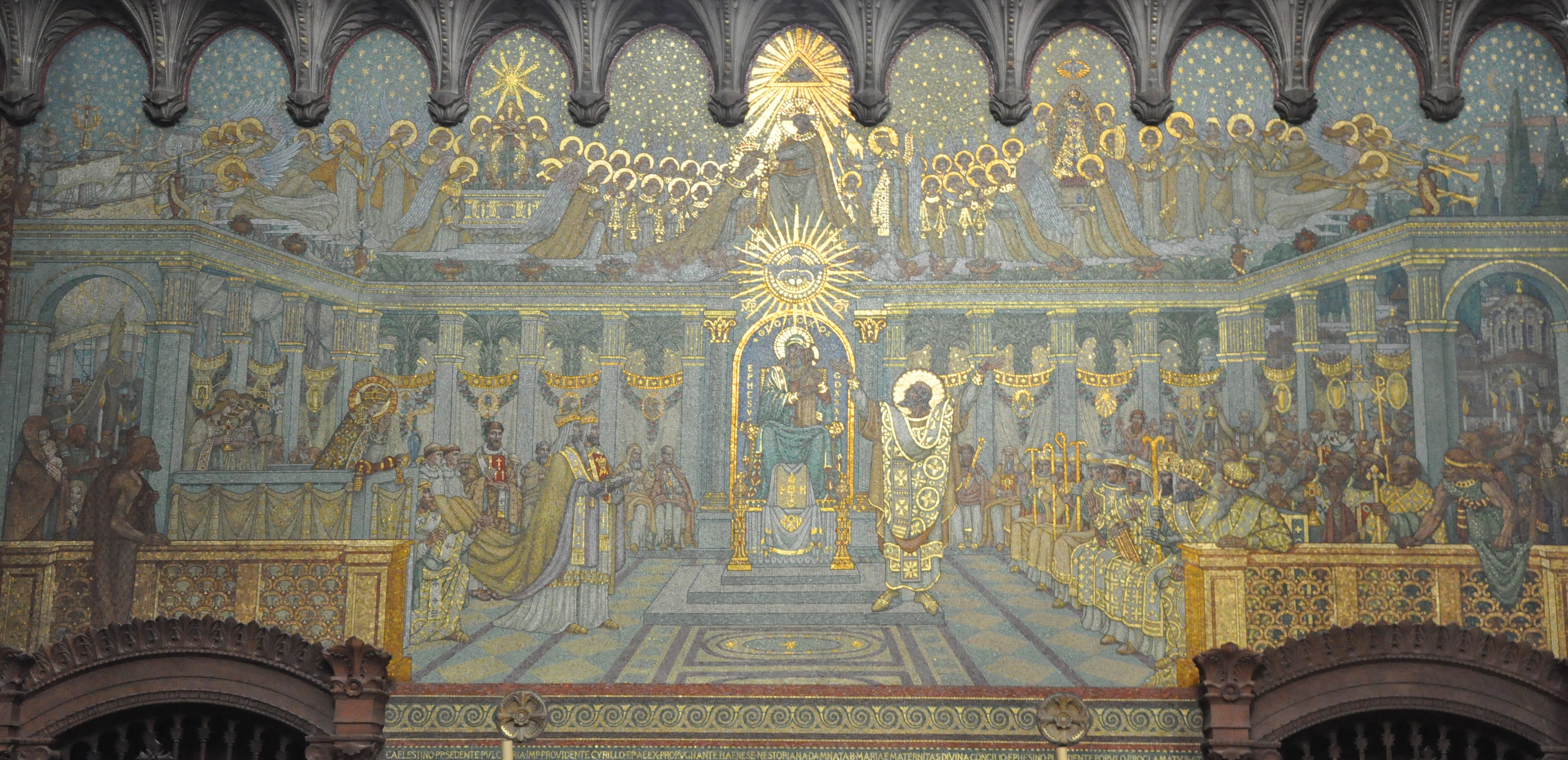
A mosaic depicting the Council of Ephesus, in the Basilica of Notre-Dame de Fourvière in Lyon. In the centre, Cyril venerates an icon of the Theotokos

These divisions came to a head in April 428, when Theodosius II appointed Nestorius, a monk from Antioch, to be the Patriarch of Constantinople. Nestorius immediately outraged the population by preaching against the use of the title Theotokos (Mother of God) for the Virgin Mary, arguing that Mary only gave birth to Christ's humanity, not his divinity. This was despite the title having a large role in popular piety, and having been used by previous theologians such as Athanasius, the Cappadocian Fathers, John Chrysostom, and even (with reservations) by Nestorius' own teacher Theodore of Mopsuestia. (Note: Theodore of Mopsuestia was quoted as saying "When they ask whether Mary was Anthropotokos or Theotokos we shall answer that she was both: he who was in the womb of Mary was man, and he came forth from there. She is Theotokos because God was in the man that was born." His justification for the title, which still denies that God the Word took flesh from the Virgin Mary and was born of her, was condemned as "impious" in the 6th Canon of the 5th Ecumenical Council.) Nestorius' main opponent was Cyril, the Patriarch of Alexandria, who wrote him three letters. In the second letter, written in February 430, Cyril criticised Nestorius' theology, arguing that the Word was not united to a man "merely as a result of will or good pleasure", but "became flesh" as is written in John 1:14, and therefore the Virgin who bore the Word in his human nature can rightly be called the Theotokos. Cyril was more aggressive in his third letter to Nestorius, which further defined his theology and ended with 12 prepositions Cyril called on Nestorius to anathematize.

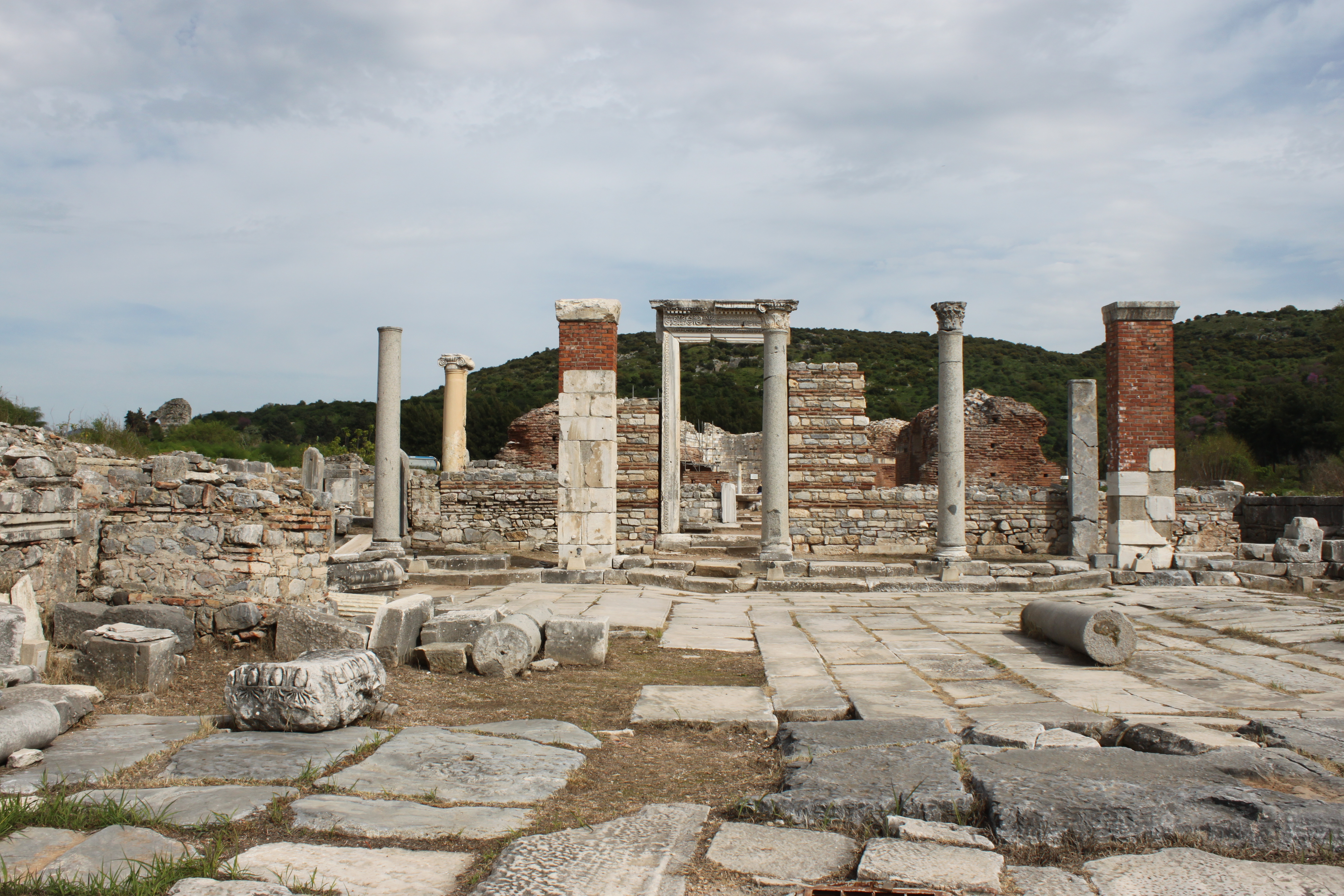
The Church of Mary in Ephesus, the site of both the Council of Ephesus and the Second Council of Ephesus

Instead of cornering Nestorius, Cyril's third letter brought his own orthodoxy into question. Theodoret of Cyrrhus and Andrew of Samosata wrote rebuttals of Cyril's 12 anathemas, to which he responded with counter-rebuttals. Both Cyril and Nestorius wrote to Pope Celestine I of Rome for support, but he sided with Cyril. To settle the dispute, Theodosius II convened the Council of Ephesus. On 22 June 431, the council condemned Nestorius as "the new Judas" and deposed him. However, the dispute was not over, as John of Antioch arrived 4 days later with a group of Syrian bishops, only to find the council already finished and Nestorius condemned. He then excommunicated Cyril and everyone who had agreed to his 12 Anathemas. In April 433, Cyril and John reconciled with one another by both agreeing to the Formula of Reunion, which stated that Christ was "of two natures" (Greek: Δύο φύσεων ἕνωσις), in a "union without confusion" (Greek: ἀσυγχύτου ἑνώσεως), and consubstantial both with the Father and with humanity. (Note: The original Greek of Cyril's Laetentur Caeli letter to John of Antioch, which contains the Formula of Reunion, can be read here. An English translation from the NPNF can be read here.)

Some of Cyril's supporters believed that the Formula of Reunion was not compatible with the 12 Anathemas, and that by accepting the former he had renounced the latter. Cyril sent many letters to these people, explaining that the Formula of Reunion was compatible with the 12 Anathemas and that he still stood by both. In some of these letters, like his second letter to Succensus, Bishop of Diocaesarea, he argued that Christ could be spoken of as having two natures after his Incarnation as long as the two natures are divided "in thought only" (Greek: τῇ θεωρίᾳ μόνῃ), the way a human body and soul can be considered different but are in fact just one person, with no real, observable division.

=== Second Council of Ephesus ===
The Monophysite view of Christ's nature ascribed to Eutyches: that Christ has only one nature after the Incarnation. This differs from Miaphytism, in which Christ's humanity and divinity do not mix, mingle, or become altered

After the Council of Ephesus, there was peace for about a decade, but theological controversies soon brewed up again in the 440s. In 447, an archimandrite in Constantinople named Eutyches, apparently misunderstanding Cyril's "one nature of God the Word incarnate" formula, began preaching that Christ has only one nature, and that his humanity was so completely "deified" by his divinity that he was not consubstantial with mankind. Bishop Eusebius of Dorylaeum, who had been one of the first people to denounce Nestorius, presented a bill of indictment formally accusing Eutyches of heresy. In November 448, Eutyches was tried by the Home Synod of Constantinople, presided by the Patriarch Flavian of Constantinople. After he refused to confess two natures after the Incarnation, the synod excommunicated Eutyches, judging that he had overreacted to Nestorianism and fallen into the opposite heresy.

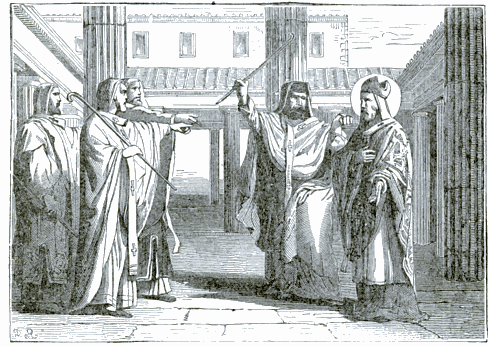
Dioscorus and Barsuma supposedly beating Flavian.

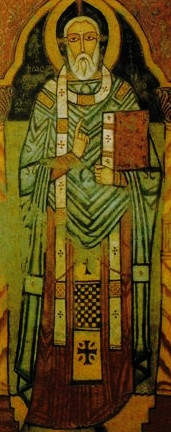
Coptic icon of Pope Dioscorus I in the Monastery of St. Anthony Red Sea, Egypt.

Flavian sent a report of Eutyches' trial to Pope Leo I, who responded with a statement of faith known as Leo's Tome. Meanwhile, Eutyches did not accept his condemnation quietly. He appealed to Emperor Theodosius II, as well as to Pope Dioscorus I of Alexandria, who had succeeded Cyril. Through the influence of Chrysaphius, Eutyches' godson and a powerful eunuch in the imperial court, Theodosius convoked another council at Ephesus to re-try Eutyches, this time presided by Dioscorus. This Second Council of Ephesus began on 8 August 449, and was attended by Flavian, Juvenal of Jerusalem, Domnus of Antioch, and about 130 other bishops. During this council, the Roman papal legates repeatedly called for Leo's Tome to be read, but they were not. After having the acts of the 448 Home Synod read, Dioscorus declared that Flavian and Eusebius were guilty of innovation, for saying that Christ had two natures after the union, and pronounced them deposed. The council immediately broke into chaos, with armed monks and soldiers charging into the church. Flavian was beaten so badly he died of his injuries; according to eyewitness Diogenes of Cyzicus, an archimandrite named Barsauma stood by and cried "Strike him dead!" as his monks beat Flavian. Although the acts of the council recorded that the bishops present assented to Eusebius and Flavian's depositions, two years later they would claim that Dioscorus used armed monks and soldiers to threaten them, had them sign blank papers, and forged statements from them. The accuracy of such events is questionable.

Despite Dioscorus' attempts to stop him, the papal legate Hilarius escaped Ephesus with great difficulty and made it back to Rome, bringing with him a letter Flavian had written to Leo shortly before his death. Leo was outraged by the Second Council of Ephesus, dubbing it a latrocinium ("synod of robbers") in a letter to Pulcheria, despite it being an imperial council called for by the Theodosius. He wrote many appeals to the emperor, the court, the clergy and the people of Constantinople urging them not to accept it, but Theodosius refused to reconsider its decrees.

== Council of Chalcedon ==
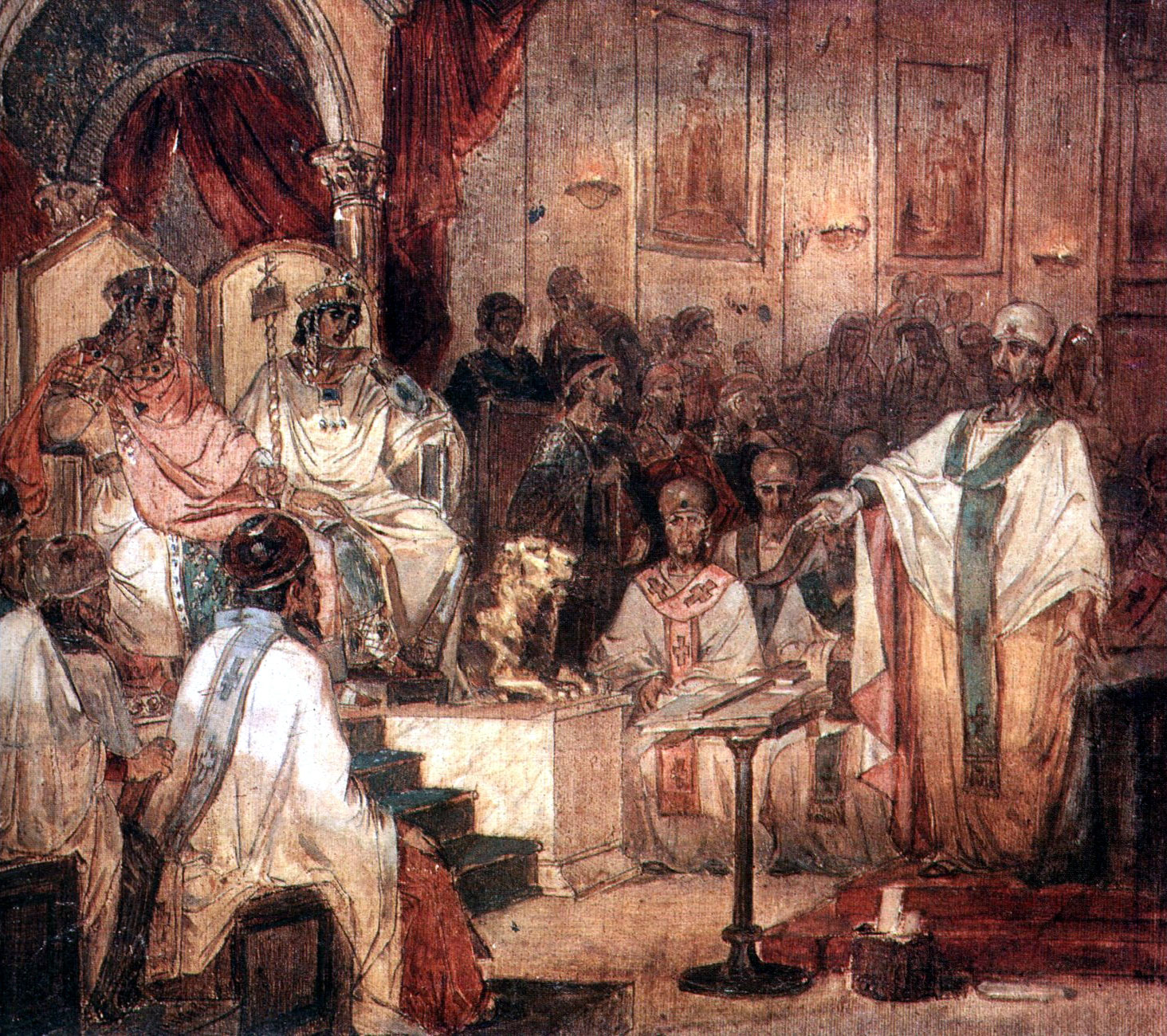
The Fourth Ecumenical Council of Chalcedon by Vasily Surikov, 1876

In July 450, Theodosius II died in a hunting accident and was succeeded by his sister Pulcheria. She immediately had Chrysaphius executed, and married the general Marcian on the condition that he allow her to keep her vow of chastity. She also reached out to Leo, who demanded the acceptance of his Tome as a condition for re-establishing communion. Anatolius and Maximus (who had been installed by Dioscorus as the patriarchs of Constantinople and Antioch respectively) assented, and Ephesus II rapidly lost support. The main criticism against it was not its theology, but the brutal methods with which it was conducted. In 451, the new emperor Marcian summoned another council in Chalcedon, "to end the disputations and settle the true faith more clearly and for all time."

The Council of Chalcedon was attended by 520 bishops, (Note: That is the traditional number, but the acts of the council seldom record more than 300 present at any one time.) of whom 124 had been present at Ephesus II. In its second session (held on 10 October), they read Leo's Tome accepted it as orthodox. Cyril's third letter to Nestorius, which contained his 12 Anathemas and his most strongly miaphysite statements, was notably absent from the discussion. The council's third session on 13 October was a trial of Dioscorus. Several accusers, most of whom had been Cyril's family or friends, listed their grievances against Dioscorus' conduct. He was repeatedly summoned to defend himself, but he was under house arrest and could not come to the council, so he was deposed in absentia. Importantly, this deposition was not for heresy, but for "grave administrative errors".

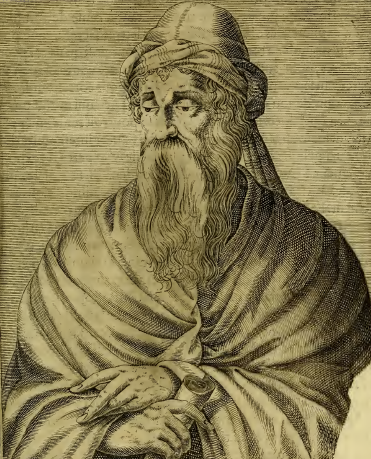
Theodoret of Cyrrhus, exonerated at Chalcedon.

In the fifth session, the imperial officials asked the bishops to compose a Definition of Faith, which would become the Chalcedonian Definition. The bishops were reluctant to do so, since Canon 7 of Ephesus forbade the use of new creeds, but eventually they wrote a draft that contained the Cyrillian phrase "of two natures" (Greek: ἐκ δύο φύσεων). Although the vast majority of the council was pleased with this draft, the papal legates protested and threatened to go home. The bishops then wrote another version, using "in two natures" (Greek: ἐν δύο φύσεσιν) instead. Many of the bishops were uncomfortable with this clause; only two years before, at Ephesus II, they had shouted "Anathema to whoever says two natures after the incarnation", and called for those who divide Christ in two to be cut into pieces. These bishops acquiesced only after the imperial officials reminded them that they had already accepted the orthodoxy of Leo's Tome, which said that "there are two natures in Christ, united without confusion, change or separation in the one only-begotten Son our Saviour".

== Aftermath ==
=== Immediate ===
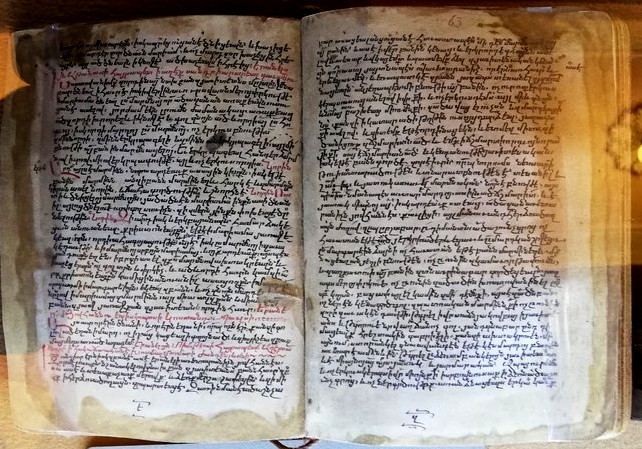
An Armenian translation of a Coptic refutation of the Council of Chalcedon, Matenadaran Institute in Yerevan, 1476

The Council of Chalcedon faced immediate opposition in the eastern parts of the Empire. Syria was divided between pro- and anti-Chalcedonians, while in Egypt the vast majority were against Chalcedon. They saw that Leo's Tome and the Chalcedonian Definition, despite condemning Nestorius in name, had restored his heretical teachings by describing Christ as "in two natures" as Cyril and the Council of Ephesus I vehemently opposed describing Christ "in two natures after the union." Rumors about Chalcedon spread in Egypt, claiming that it had vindicated Nestorius' teachings, that it taught that the one crucified was not God, that it was not scriptural, and that the Jews were delighted to hear of it. (Note: According to Michael the Syrian, the Jews supposedly sent this letter to Marcian: To the merciful Emperor Marcian: the people of the Hebrews... for a long time we have been regarded as though our fathers had crucified a God and not a man. Since the synod of Chalcedon has assembled and demonstrated that he who was crucified was a man and not a God we request that we should be pardoned this fault and that our synagogues should be returned to us.) Leo complained that Greek translations of his Tome misleadingly made him speak of "two persons". These rumors were not helped by the fact that Chalcedon had restored two Nestorian bishops to their sees, Theodoret of Cyrrhus and Ibas of Edessa. The opposition to Chalcedon initially included respectable monastic figures like Saint Gerasimus, Saint Gerontius (former confidant of Melania the Younger), Peter the Iberian, and the former empress Aelia Eudocia.

Patriarch Juvenal of Jerusalem, who was originally Dioscorus' ally but switched sides at Chalcedon, returned to violent protests in Palestine which temporarily drove him out of his see. In Egypt, a mob set fire to the Serapeum, killing many soldiers who were inside. At first, Marcian and Pulcheria tried using diplomacy, writing letters directly to the rebels, but when that did not work they sent troops to suppress them. In Egypt, those troops raped women, further galvanising Egyptian opposition to Chalcedon. (Note: According to Evagrius Scholasticus, Priscus of Paniou witnessed "the license of the soldiery towards the wives and daughters of the Alexandrians" (Κἀντεῦθεν τῶν στρατιωτῶν παροινούντων ἔς τε τὰς γαμετὰς καὶ θυγατέρας τῶν ᾿Αλεξανδρέων).)

Of the 20 Egyptian bishops at Chalcedon, 13 refused to depose Dioscorus. They argued that they would be killed in Egypt if they turned on Dioscorus, (Note: Proterius' death would later prove that their fears were well-founded.) and cited Canon 6 of Nicaea, which states that bishops of Egypt should be under the authority of the Pope of Alexandria. However, four of the Egyptian bishops joined the council in condemning Dioscorus. Those four consecrated his former arch-priest Proterius as the next Pope of Alexandria. He had been known for his strong Cyrillian position, to the extent that Leo even doubted his orthodoxy. But on Holy Thursday of 457, soon after Marcian's death, Proterius was lynched by a mob of anti-Chalcedonians while celebrating the Eucharist. Two anti-Chalcedonian bishops (one of whom was Peter the Iberian) then consecrated Timothy Ailuros in the Caesareum Church as their new Pope.

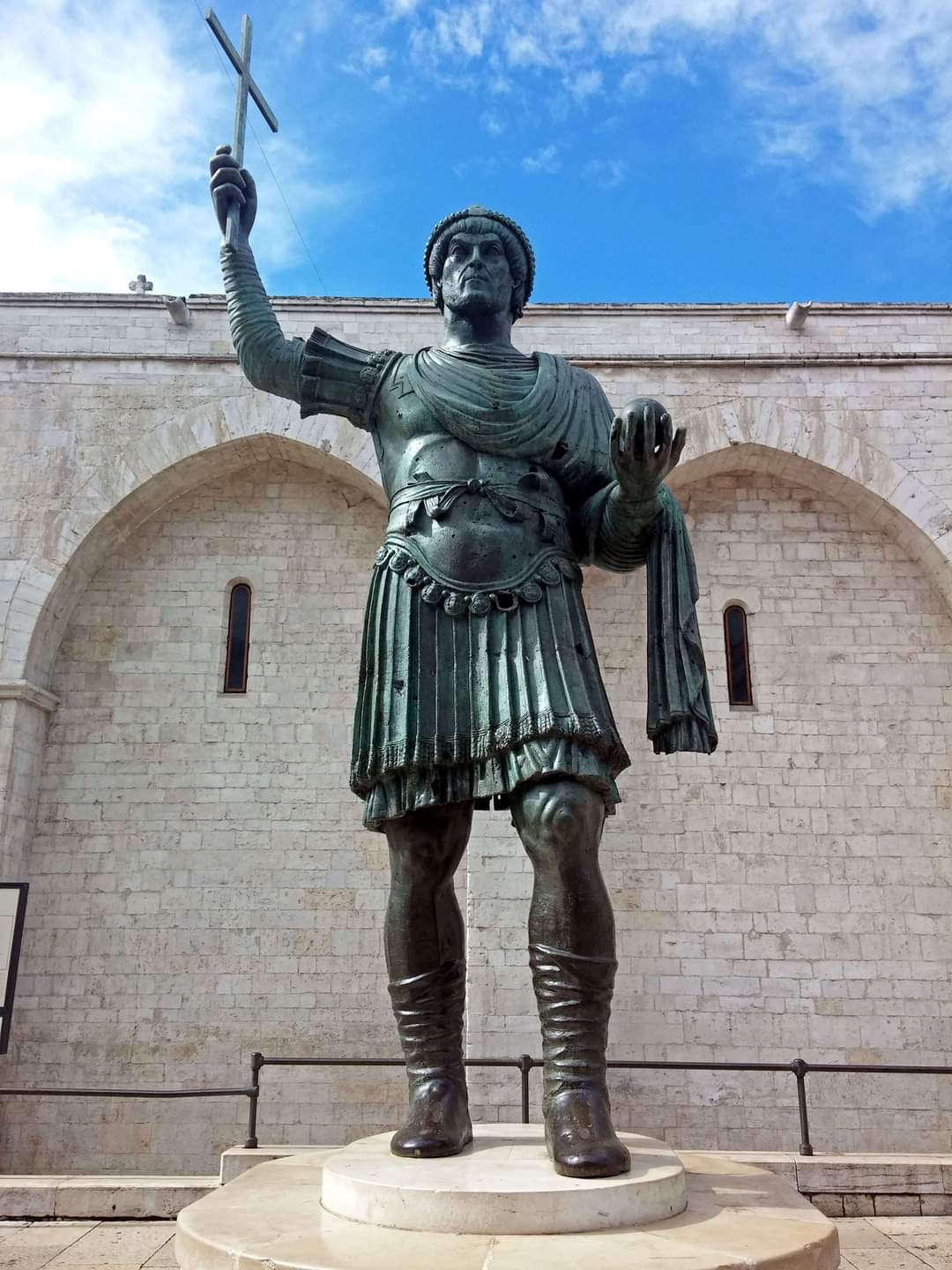
The Colossus of Barletta, which depicts either Marcian or Leo

Marcian's successor Leo was unsure of how to deal with Timothy, as he did not want to use force like Marcian had. Instead, he held a "plebiscite" in 457, asking every bishop in the empire (as well as respected monks like Simeon Stylites) for their opinions on Timothy's legitimacy. The overwhelming majority of the responses, which are recorded in the Codex Encyclius, were against Timothy and pro-Chalcedon. Timothy was approached in person and asked to follow the majority of the episcopate, but he refused. He was then arrested in the middle of a popular insurrection, which the army violently put down by killing 10,000 people. His successor, Timothy Salophakiolos, was well-liked by both sides of the schism, and did his best to reconcile them to each other. However, the non-Chalcedonians continued to consider Timothy Ailuros their Pope.

One sticking point between Chalcedonians and Miaphysites was Theopaschism: the belief that God the Son suffered in the flesh on the cross. Theopaschism had been affirmed in Cyril's 12th anathema and in the Nicene Creed. (Note: Cyril's 12th anathema: The Word of God suffered in the flesh Leo's Tome: The impassible God did not disdain to be a passible man, nor the immortal one to submit to the laws of death Nicene Creed: The only-begotten Son of God, begotten of the Father before all ages; Light of Light, true God of true God... was crucified for us under Pontius Pilate, and suffered and was buried) However, several Chalcedonian writers, like Theodoret, Gennadius, Macedonius, and the Acoemetae, were unwilling or reluctant to confess it. In 469, the magister militum per Orientem Zeno appointed the non-Chalcedonian Peter the Fuller as Patriarch of Antioch.

Zeno became emperor in 474, but the next year he was ousted by Basiliscus. He tried to appease the Miaphysites by restoring Timothy Ailuros and Peter the Fuller (both of whom were in exile) to their patriarchates. When Timothy arrived in Constantinople from his exile in Cherson, he was greeted by the populace and Basiliscus himself, then paraded by Alexandrian seamen to the "Great Church" (later the Hagia Sophia) on a donkey, as though he were Jesus himself. (Note: While recounting this, Theodorus Lector could not resist mentioning that Timothy fell off the donkey and badly injured his foot) He then entered Alexandria to popular cries of "Blessed is he who comes in the name of the Lord". On 9 April 475, Basiliscus published an encyclical which praised the first three ecumenical councils, but condemned Chalcedon and Leo's Tome. These measures were widely popular in Egypt and Syria, but equally unpopular in Constantinople and Rome. The Patriarch of Constantinople, Acacius, refused to sign the encyclical, and Daniel the Stylite descended from his pillar for the first time in 33 years to chastise Basiliscus as a "new Diocletian". Faced by all this, Basiliscus backtracked and published a counter-encyclical, which made no mention of Chalcedon.

=== Acacian Schism ===
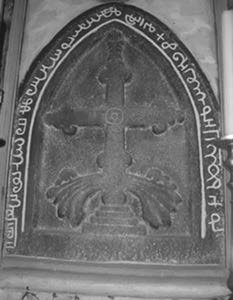
A 5th or 6th century Saint Thomas stone cross inscribed in Pahlavi with a theopaschite formula: He who is truly God in heaven suffered on the cross. Valiyapalli Church in Kottayam, India

In 476, Zeno was restored as emperor, and all of Basiliscus' acts were abrogated. On 28 July 482, on the advice of Acacius, Zeno published the Henotikon in an attempt to mend the schism. It accepted the orthodoxy of Cyril's 12 Anathemas in his third letter to Nestorius (which was ignored at Chalcedon), but also that of the Formula of Reunion in his letter to John of Antioch (which was an embarrassment to anti-Chalcedonians). It neither endorsed nor condemned Chalcedon. The eastern patriarchs and bishops were required to sign it in order to keep their sees, so the majority did. But in Rome, Pope Felix III rejected it. He excommunicated Acacius and everyone who had signed the Henotikon, beginning the Acacian Schism. The Henotikon remained the official policy of the empire for the rest of Zeno's reign, as well as that of his successor Anastasius.

The Henotikon's vague wording meant that pro- and anti-Chalcedonians continued to quarrel, despite both sides accepting the Henotikon. Evagrius wrote that "in those days, the council of Chalcedon was neither openly proclaimed in the most holy churches, nor was it rejected by all; each bishop acted according to his conviction". Anti-Chalcedonians interpreted a specific statement in the Henotikon (Note: Everyone who has held or holds any other opinion [than that of Nicaea], either at the present or another time, whether at Chalcedon or at any synod whatsoever, we anathematize, and especially Nestorius and Eutyches and those who uphold their doctrines. According to historian Richard Price, the actual intention of this sentence was to anathematise the minority of bishops at Chalcedon who were accused of Nestorianising, particularly Theodoret of Cyrrhus and Ibas of Edessa.) as a condemnation of Chalcedon, while Chalcedonians disagreed with that interpretation. In 490, the openly Chalcedonian Patriarch Euphemius of Constantinople broke communion with Alexandria, and so did Flavian of Antioch and Elias of Jerusalem. They tried to re-establish communion with Rome, but Pope Gelasius unrealistically demanded that they remove Acacius from the diptychs exclusively on the basis of his deposition by Rome.

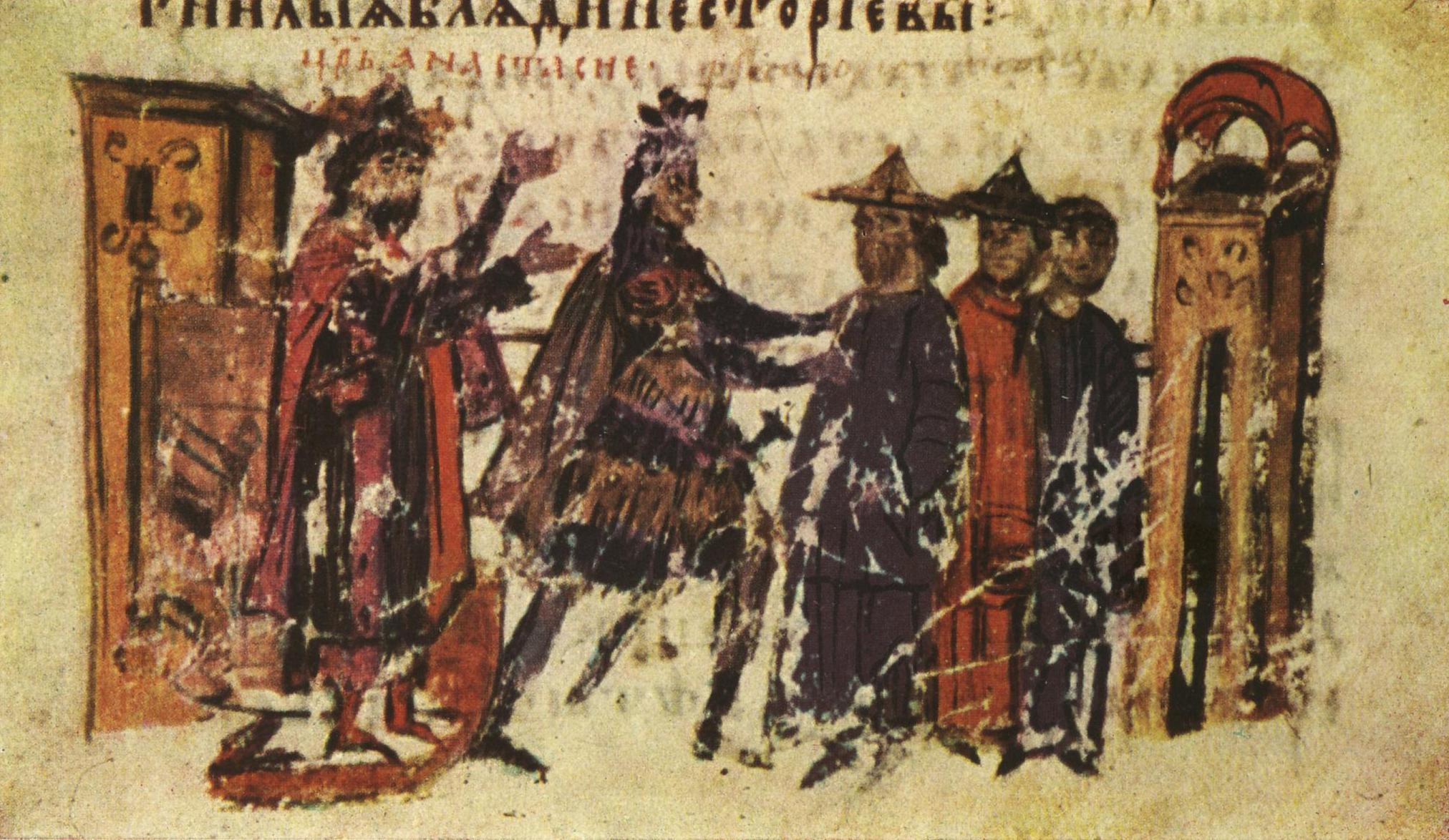
Justin I (left) persecuting Miaphysites, miniature from the 12th century Manasses Chronicle

Around this time, Severus of Antioch was becoming the main spokesman of the anti-Chalcedonians. He was a convert from paganism, a brilliant theologian and an extremely prolific writer (Note: Severus' extant writings alone take up six volumes of the Patrologia Graeca, while every other Byzantine writer between 451 and 553 combined has only one.) educated in rhetoric, Greek, philosophy and law. In 509, he was expelled from Antioch by Chalcedonians, and took refuge in Constantinople. There, he wrote a typos, circulated by Anastasius, that presented itself as an interpretation of the Henotikon, but condemned Chalcedon and Leo's Tome. He also promoted the theopaschite addition to the Trisagion. When it was chanted for the first time at the Great Church in 512, Chalcedonians rioted, overthrew statues of Anastasius, and violently attacked Miaphysites. Anastasius calmed them by appearing before the crowds at the Hippodrome in mourning clothes and without his crown, and offering to resign as emperor.

Also in 512, the Miaphysites secured Severus' ordination as Patriarch of Antioch. Anastasius, who hoped to use the Henotikon to bridge Chalcedonians and Miaphysites, was frustrated by Severus' persistent attempts to make it an anti-Chalcedonian document. By the time Anastasius died in 518, it was clear that the Henotikon had failed to live up to its name, which means "unifier". The next emperor, Justin I, therefore abandoned it, restored Chalcedon, and expelled Miaphysite bishops (including Severus) from every province except Egypt. He and his two consuls, Vitalian and Justinian, sought reunion with Rome at any cost. Pope Hormisdas sent them the Libellus Hormisdae, a list people Rome wanted condemned that included Acacius, his four successors, and the emperors Zeno and Anastasius. The patriarch John signed it on 28 March 519, ending the Acacian Schism.

Beginning from about 520, Julian of Halicarnassus claimed that Christ's body was incorruptible since his Incarnation, and that therefore his humanity was different to ours. Severus corrected him, arguing that Christ's body only became incorruptible following his Resurrection. Julian responded with insults, and soon the Miaphysite movement was divided between Severians and Julianists (who were also known as Aphthartodocetae). From then on, Severus had to fight on two fronts: on one side against the Chalcedonians, and on the other against the Aphthartodocetae.

=== Justinian ===
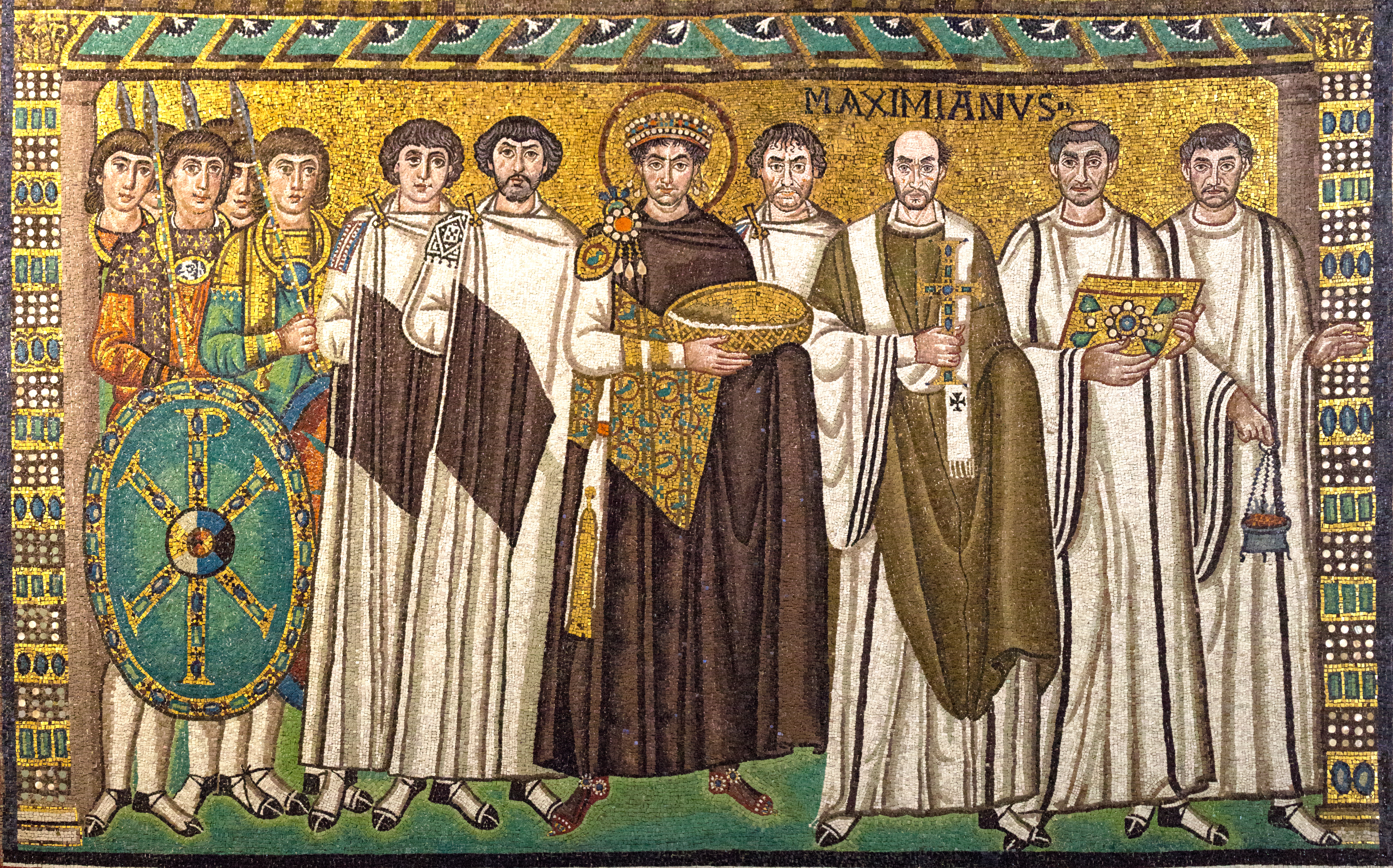
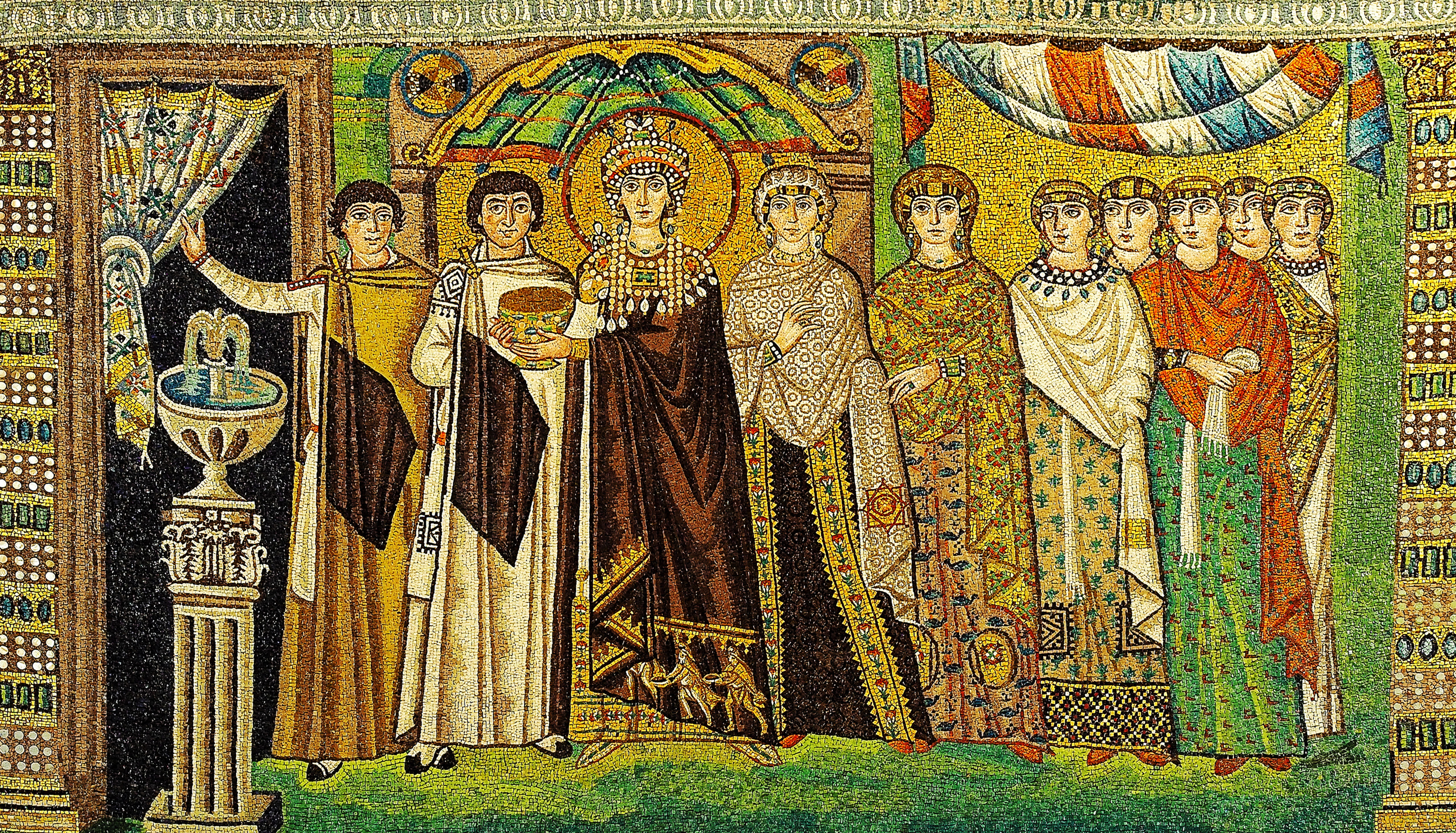
Mosaics of Justinian (above) and Theodora (below) with their respective retinues, Basilica of San Vitale in Ravenna, 547

In addition to the end of the Acacian Schism, March 519 also saw the arrival in Constantinople of a group of Scythian monks from modern Dobruja, headed by John Maxentius. These monks held a Christology that was both Cyrillian and Chalcedonian. Importantly, they promoted the theopaschite formula "One of the Holy Trinity suffered in the flesh" (which had been used in 435 by Proclus in his Tome to the Armenians). The Scythian monks believed that, since Christ's hypostasis which suffered in the flesh was the pre-existent hypostasis of the Logos, and since there is one Son, not two, their theopaschite formula was a necessary litmus test for orthodoxy. After campaigning unsuccessfully for the adoption of their formula in Constantinople, they also went to Rome to present their case before Pope Hormisdas. Although they met support there (such as from Fulgentius of Ruspe and their fellow Scythian Dionysius Exiguus), Hormisdas eventually decided that their theopaschite formula was unnecessary and expelled them from Rome. However, they won the support of Justinian, who became convinced that their formula was the key to religious unity in the empire.

Justinian was an ambitious man with a keen interest in theology. He had a grand vision to restore the empire, which involved reuniting the East and West and bringing all his subjects to the one orthodox faith. His reign during the 530s was almost miraculously successful: He published masterpieces of Roman law like the Digest, Institutes, Novellae, and Code of Laws (which included a theopaschite confession of faith in its preamble). He built the Hagia Sophia as a church for all his Christian subjects, and it remains the second-largest Orthodox cathedral ever completed. His general Belisarius reconquered Africa and Italy, bringing the Byzantine Empire to the greatest territorial extent in its history. Thus, his early religious policies were set against an optimistic backdrop.

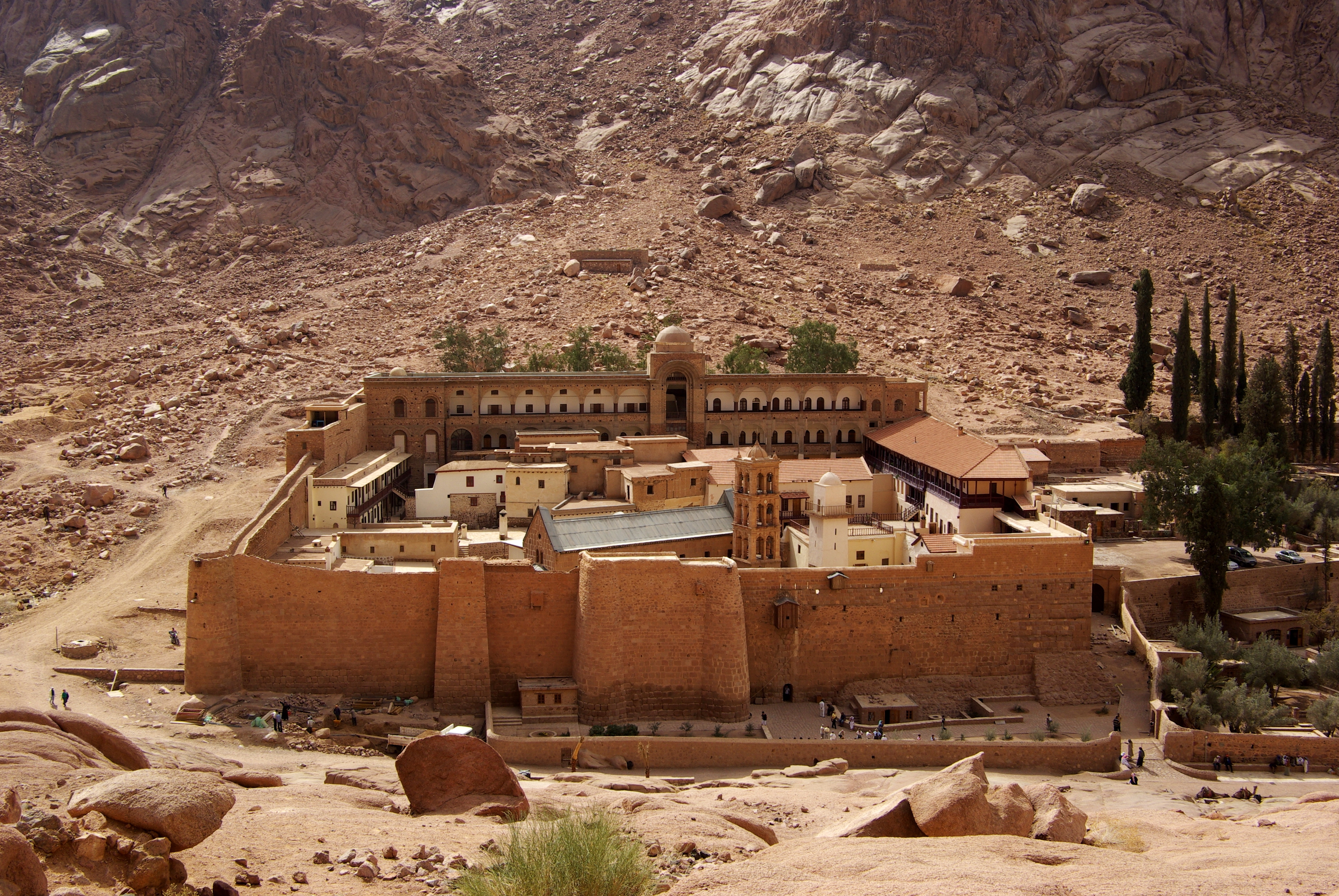
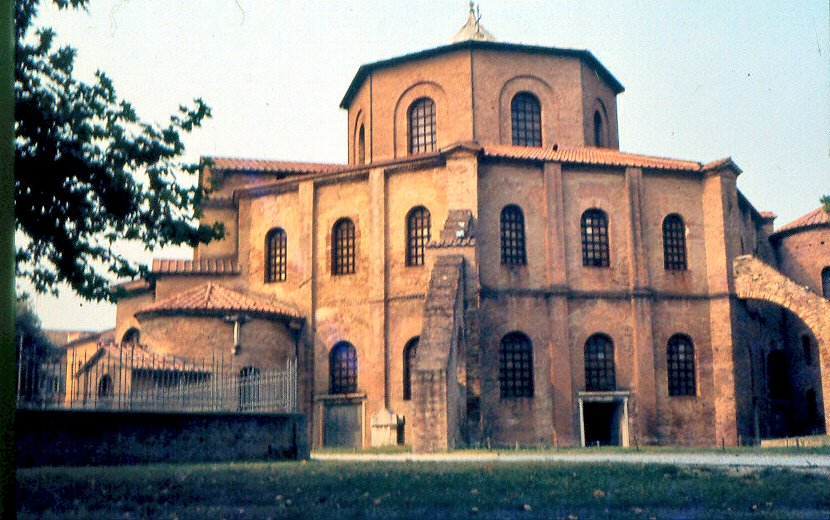
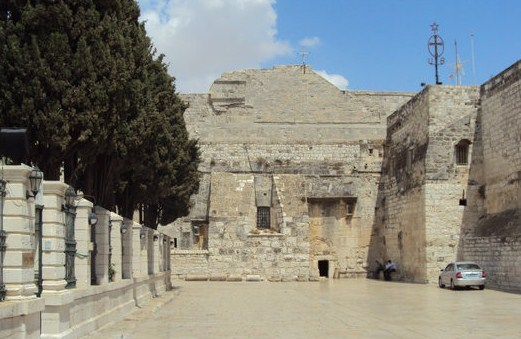
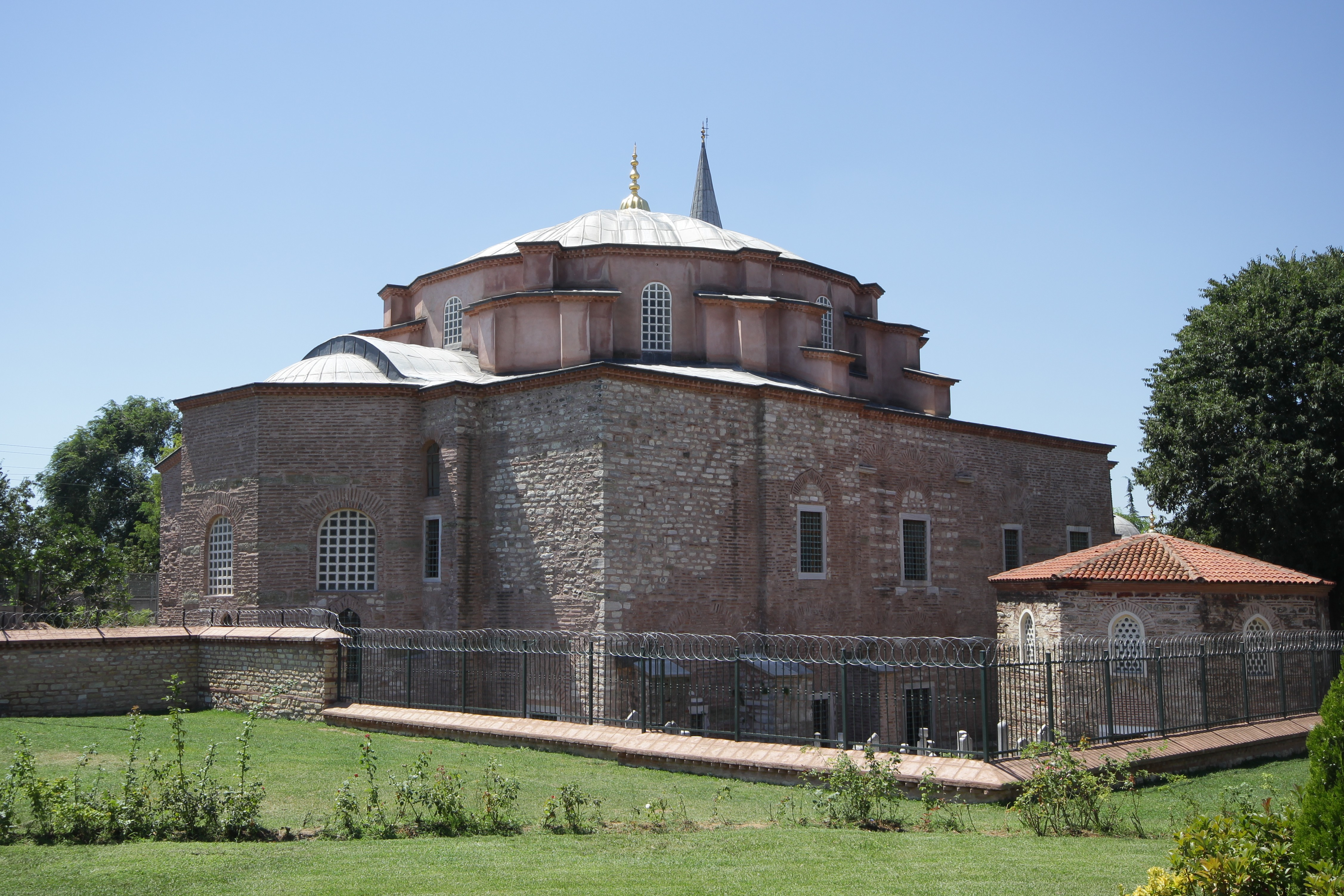
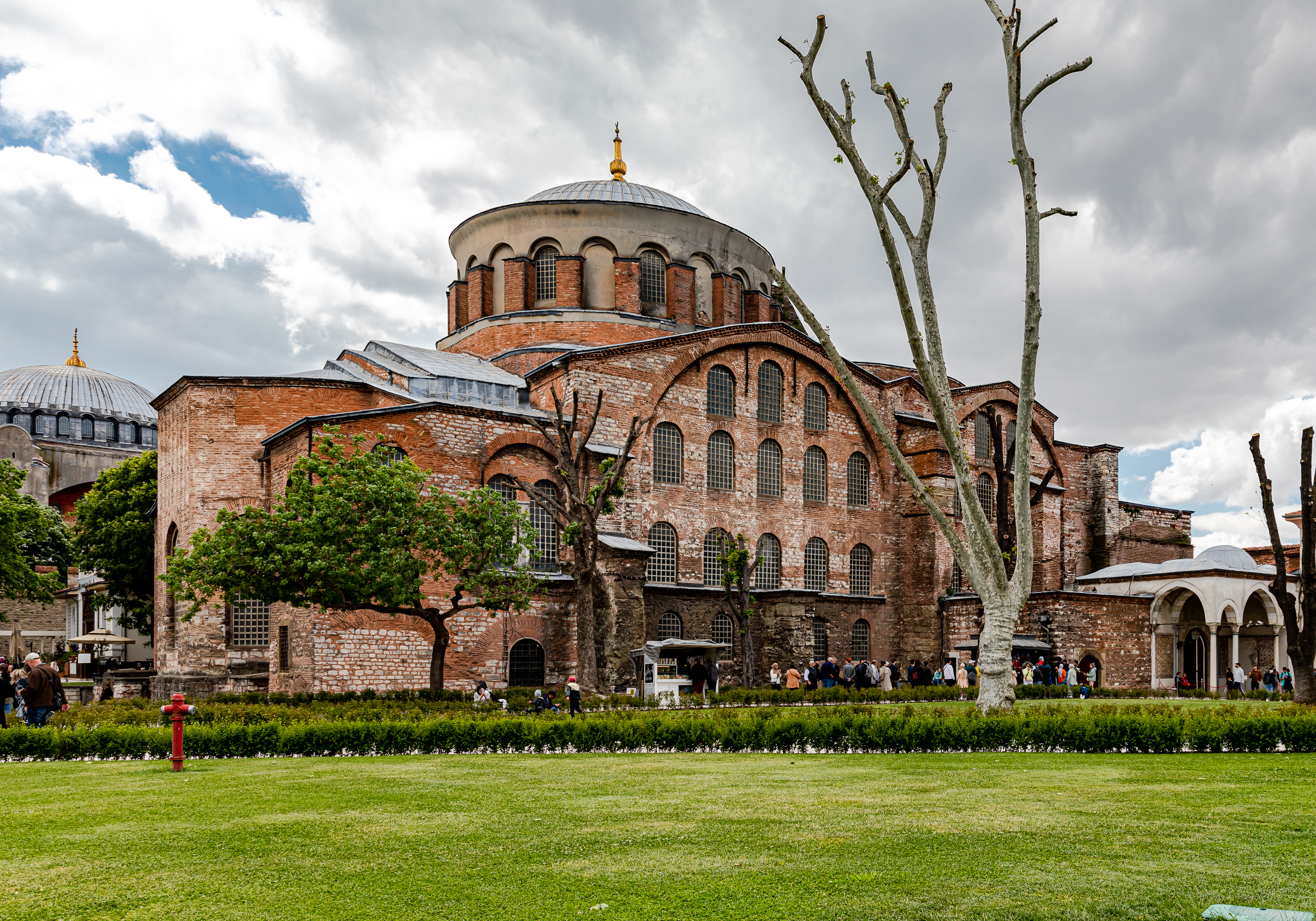
Six of the many churches built by Justinian. Clockwise from top left: The Hagia Sophia, Saint Catherine's Monastery, the Church of the Nativity, the Hagia Irene, the Little Hagia Sophia, and the Basilica of San Vitale

In his dealings with non-Chalcedonians, Justinian was advised and helped by his Miaphysite wife Theodora. His cooperation with Theodora on religious affairs, and their love and support for one another, were so strong that their contemporaries Procopius and Evagrius suspected they were only pretending to disagree. In 532, following her advice, he invited 6 Chalcedonian and 6 Miaphysite theologians to a conference in Constantinople. This was one of the very few times in the schism's history that competent representatives from either side calmly discussed their differences. The Miaphysites admitted that Eutyches was a heretic, that Dioscorus made a mistake in 449 by restoring him, and that therefore Marcian was justified in summoning a council. Meanwhile, the Chalcedonians fully accepted theopaschism. When Justinian asked the Miaphysites to list their biggest issues with Chalcedon, they mentioned that it had restored two Nestorian bishops to their sees: Theodoret of Cyrrhus and Ibas of Edessa. The Chalcedonian delegates admitted that Ibas' letter to Mari the Persian had doctrinal issues, but could not condemn him because Chalcedon had declared him orthodox. At the end of the conference, Justinian asked the non-Chalcedonians to recognise that the Chalcedonians are not heretics, but they refused. However, one of them (Philoxenus of Doliche) converted to Chalcedonianism.

The conference gave Justinian the impression that further interfaith discussion could alleviate the religious division in his empire. To promote theopaschism and help his Miaphysite subjects integrate into the state church, he had the hymn Only-begotten Son added to the order of the eucharistic synaxis. During this time, in 535, Severus himself came to Constantinople, where Theodora sheltered him and hundreds of his followers in the Palace of Hormisdas. There, he entered negotiations with Patriarch Anthimus over a plan to reunite the two churches which would have involved the Miaphysites accepting Chalcedon. However, when Pope Agapetus visited Constantinople in February 536, Justinian had to tone down his religious tolerance. He convened another synod in May which condemned Anthimus, Severus, and other Miaphysite leaders. Imperial recognition to the papacy of Theodosius I was revoked and emperor chose Paul to replace him as the Patriarch of Alexandria. As deposition of Theodosius and installation of Paul was not recognized by the Miaphysites, from thereon, Patriarchate of Alexandria was duplicated permanently into parallel Greek and Coptic churches, while Severus and his followers had to flee back to Egypt, and Anthimus was hidden by Theodora in her palace until her death 12 years later. But even after this, Justinian (through Theodora's mediation) maintained respectful relations with his Miaphysite subjects.

In stark contrast to the 530s, the 540s were marked by unrelenting disaster. In 540, the Sasanians captured, looted, burned and deported the population of Antioch, while the Ostrogothic king Totila retook almost all of Italy. The Plague of Justinian also swept the empire from 541 to 543, killing 10,000 people a day in Constantinople alone. Justinian apparently interpreted all these disasters as signs of God's anger with the schism, and so redoubled his efforts to repair it. This was urgent, as separate Miaphysite churches and ecclesiastical hierarchies were being established around this time. In Syria, Jacob Baradaeus and John of Tella were worsening the schism by performing thousands of "underground" ordinations, under the belief that Sacraments from Chalcedonian priests were invalid.

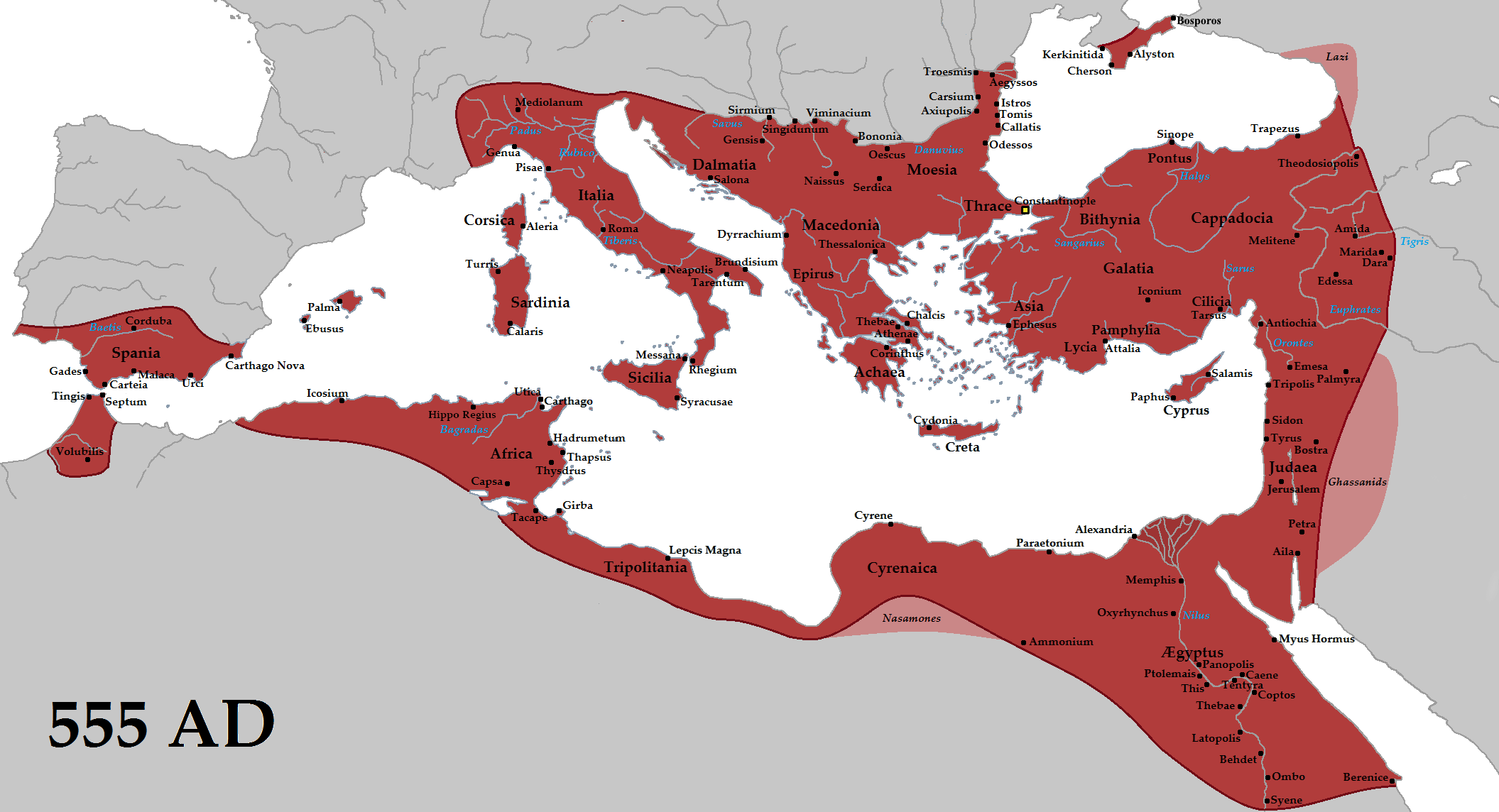
The Byzantine Empire in 555 under Justinian I, the greatest extent it ever reached. Vassal states shaded in pink

In 543, in response to an unrelated theological controversy called the Origenist crisis, Justinian published an edict condemning Origenism. He soon followed it with another edict condemning the Three Chapters: several controversially Nestorian writings by Theodore of Mopsuestia, Theodoret of Cyrrhus and Ibas of Edessa. Because their authors had all been declared orthodox at Chalcedon, these writings were often used to accuse Chalcedon of Nestorianism (like at the 532 conference). So, by condemning them, Justinian intended to remove any reasonable grounds for the Miaphysites to make that accusation. He hoped that this step, even if it does not end the controversy over Chalcedon, would at least stop the Miaphysites from abandoning the state church and establishing a rival church, thereby preventing the schism from becoming permanent. He wrote many theological treatises, particularly during the decade of 543–553, trying to convince his opponents (Origenists, Miaphysites and defenders of the Three Chapters) to accept his views.

Justinian's edict was relatively uncontroversial in the East, where, after some convincing, all four patriarchs signed it. But the vast majority of bishops in Italy and Africa opposed it, not necessarily because they agreed with the Three Chapters, but because the edict seemed to defy the Council of Chalcedon which declared Ibas and Theodoret orthodox. They broke communion with the East, beginning the Schism of the Three Chapters. Realising that he needed Pope Vigilius' support to win over the Western bishops, Justinian invited him to Constantinople to negotiate. There, after six months of imperial pressure, Vigilius signed a pledge anathematising the Three Chapters, giving one copy of it to Justinian and one to Theodora. The next year, in 548, he published the Iudicatum, publicly condemning the Three Chapters. It was met with unexpectedly strong protests in the West, with one bishop (Reparatus of Carthage) even convening a council that deposed the Pope. Justinian allowed Vigilius to withdraw the Iudicatum, and they agreed that the issue of the Three Chapters would have to be solved by an ecumenical council. In July 551, Justinian published another edict, On the orthodox faith, which concluded with 13 anathemas. (Note: Justinian's On the orthodox faith can be read in its original Greek and Latin from pages 71 to 111 here, or beginning from page 993 here. An English translation by Richard Price, based on that of Fr Paul Wesche, can be read from pages 143 to 173 here.) This led a falling out between him and Vigilius, whom he put under house arrest until the council.

==== Second Council of Constantinople ====
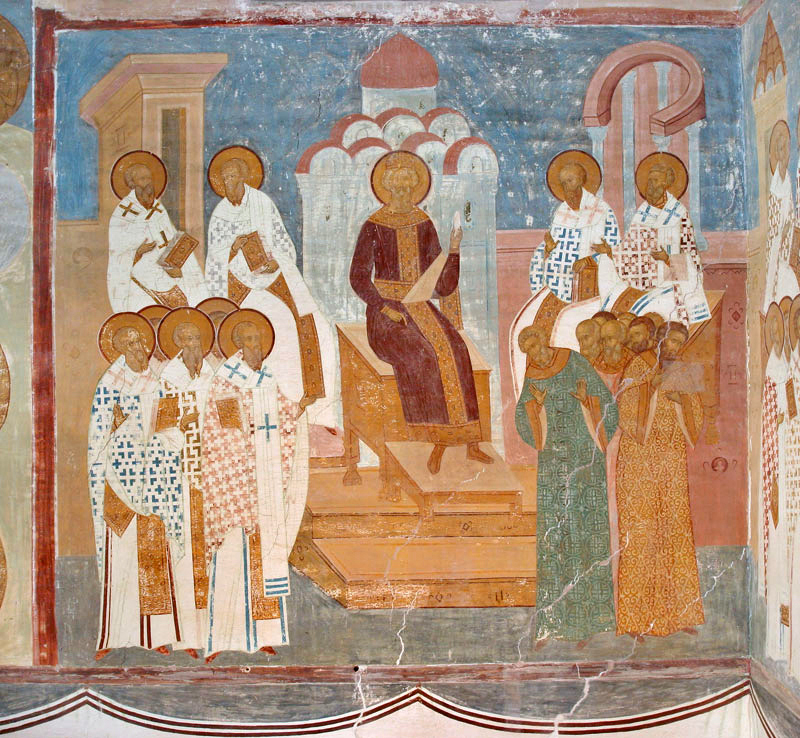
Fresco depicting the Second Council of Constantinope in the Ferapontov Monastery, 1502

The Second Council of Constantinople began on 5 May 553 with 145 bishops, the vast majority of whom were Eastern. In the first three sessions, the bishops repeatedly summoned Vigilius to attend the council, but he refused. Instead, he sent them the Constitutum, which anathematised everyone who condemned the Three Chapters. Justinian responded by presenting Vigilius' pledge and the Iudicatum as proof that Vigilius himself had opposed the Three Chapters for seven years, and thus he anathematised himself. The council therefore excommunicated Vigilius and moved on to examining the Three Chapters. In the council's last session on 2 June, they approved a list of 14 canons, largely based on the anathemas at the end of Justinian's On the orthodox faith. The canons affirmed Chalcedon, but interpreted it in a way that aligned with Cyril of Alexandria's writings. For example, Canon 3 affirmed the Scythian monks' theopaschite formula, Canon 7 affirmed Cyril's phrase τῇ θεωρίᾳ μόνῃ, and Canon 13 explicitly affirmed Cyril's 12 Anathemas which were ignored at Chalcedon.

Justinian then took drastic measures against the Western bishops who opposed the council. Vigilius himself was imprisoned until he agreed to condemn the Three Chapters. After Vigilius' death in 555, Justinian appointed as the next Pope his deacon Pelagius, who had initially opposed the council but later changed his mind. Justinian and Pelagius suppressed the Schism of the Three Chapters so thoroughly that, by the next decade, most of the West had accepted Constantinople II. They achieved this by deposing and exiling many opponents of the council, like Reparatus of Carthage, Facundus of Hermiane, Victor of Tunnuna, Theodore of Cebarsussi, Primasius of Hadrumetum, Felix of Gillitanum and Liberatus of Carthage. Some of these exiles wrote chronicles, and their writings have since shaped the low reputation of Constantinople II in the West. As historian Richard Price put it, "in this case history was written by the losers". By 568, the only areas that remained against Constantinople II were in northern Italy, which was controlled by the Lombards, not the Byzantines. The Patriarchate of Aquileia remained out of communion with Rome until the Council of Pavia in 698, long after the reason behind the Schism of the Three Chapters had been forgotten.

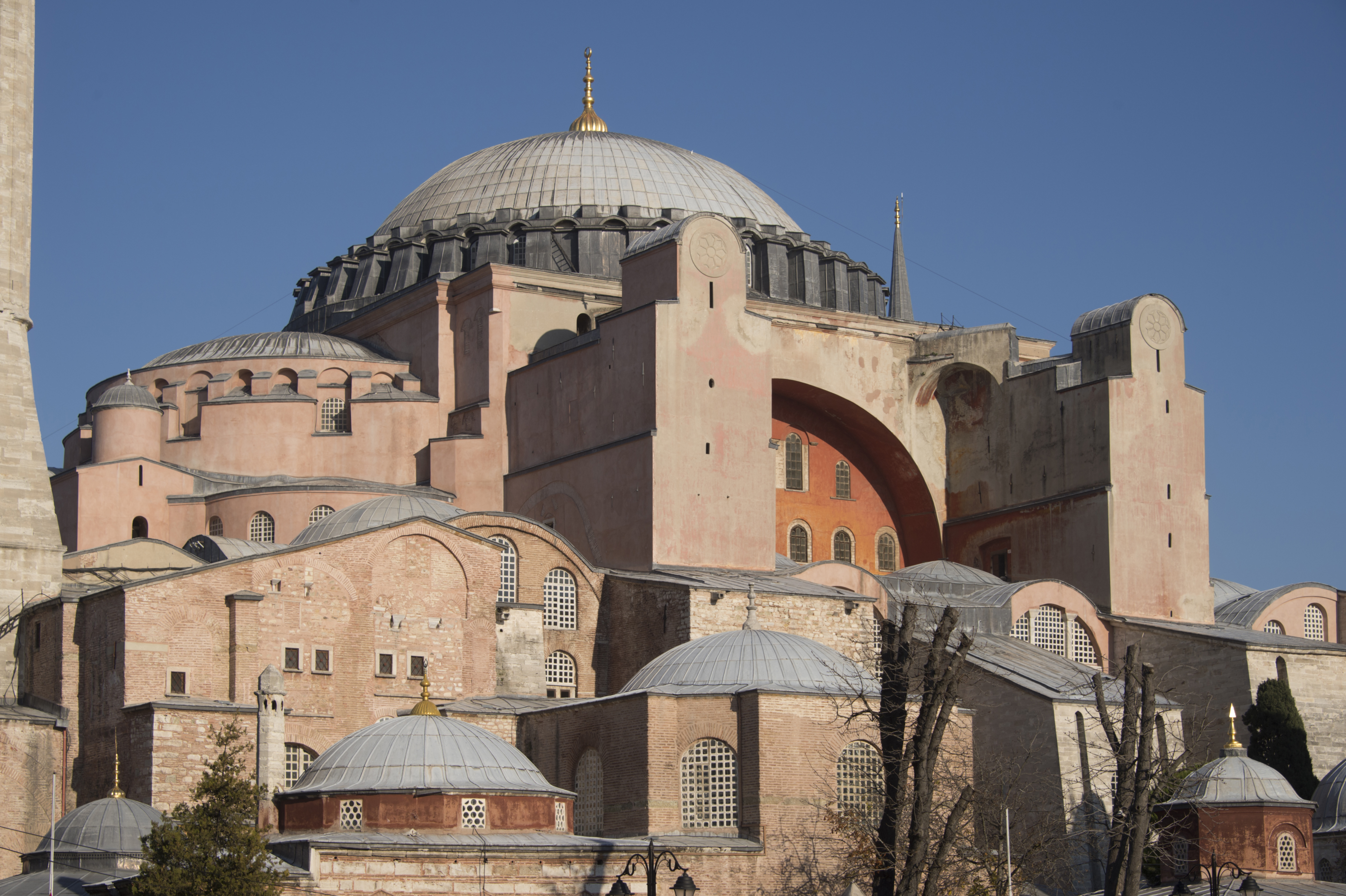
The southwest corner of the Hagia Sophia, the site of the Mega Sekreton or secretarium where the council was held

Sadly, the Second Council of Constantinople failed to restore unity with the Miaphysites. They saw it not as proof that the Chalcedonians had repented of their errors and could now be reconciled with, but as proof that Chalcedon was so flawed it needed to be corrected by another ecumenical council. According to the tract De sectis, they asked "Why do you anathematize [Theodoret and Ibas]? They are either good or evil. If they are good, why do you anathematize them? If they are evil, why did the council accept them?" (Note: Leontius continues "To this we reply that Justinian did this out of accommodation. For when, as we have said, he saw the Hesitants rejecting the council because of these men, he thought that, if he anathematized them, he would get the council accepted; and therefore he thought it appropriate to anathematize two individuals (even if they ought not to have been anathematized) so that he might bring about the reunion of all. This is why he anathematized them. Nevertheless, not even so did the Hesitants accept the council". The full tract in Greek and Latin can be read here in the Patrologia Graeca.) The Miaphysite scholar John Philoponus listed canons from Chalcedon and Constantinople II that he believed contradict each other, concluding that the Chalcedonians had anathematised themselves.

=== After Justinian ===
Justinian was succeeded by his nephew Justin II, who was advised in religious affairs by his wife Sophia, much like Justinian and Theodora. They largely continued Justinian's policy of remaining Chalcedonian but maintaining respectful relations with Miaphysites. For example, Justin and Sophia personally met Pope Theodosius of Alexandria, and had him buried with honour when he died in 566. Justin also ordered that the Nicene Creed be recited at each Eucharist, to show that the Chalcedonian Church had not betrayed the ancient faith. He and the staunchly Chalcedonian Patriarch John Scholasticus even participated in the internal debates of the Miaphysites, and invited prominent Miaphysites like Jacob Baradaeus to Constantinople for negotiations.

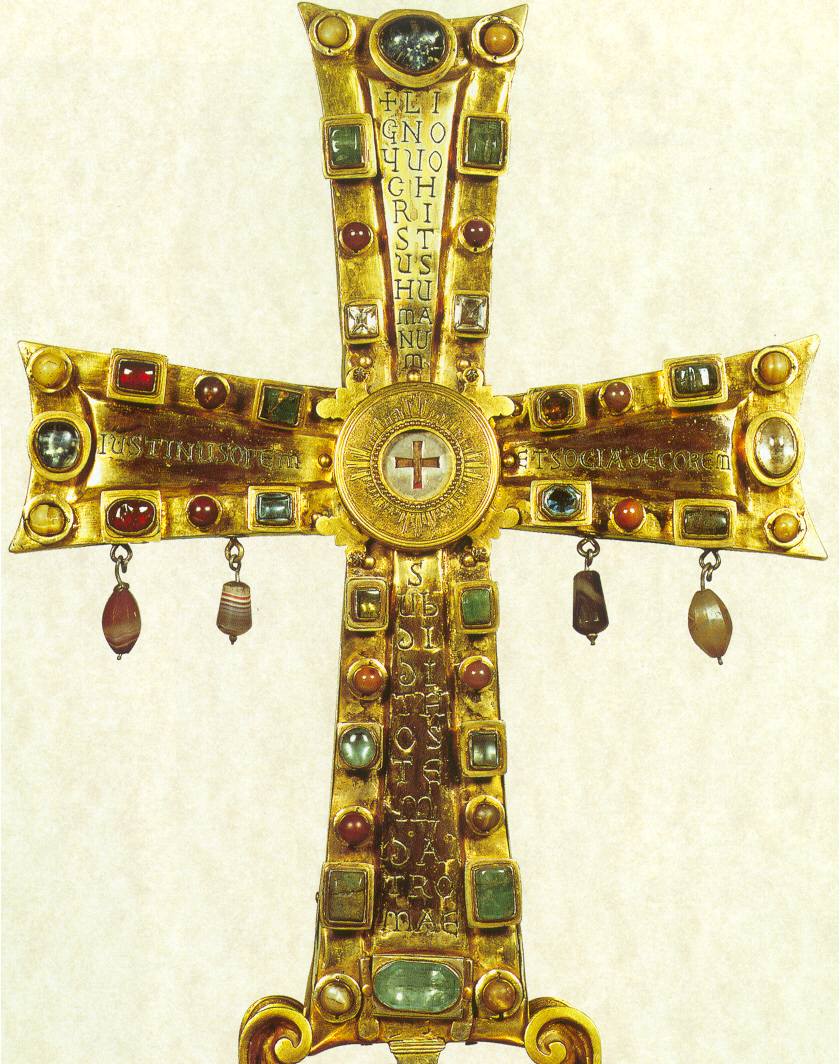
The Cross of Justin II, gifted by Justin and Sophia to the people of Rome. In its centre is a small piece of the True Cross

In 571, Justin II published a "Program for all Christians" (Greek: τοῖς ἑκασταχοῦ χριστιανοῖς πρόγραμμα), referred to by some historians as Justin's Second Henotikon. (Note: Justin's Second Henotikon, as recorded by Evagrius Scholasticus, can be read in its original Greek in pages 525–529 here, or pages 146–149 at Scholasticus 1844. An English translation by Edward Walford (who systematically translates hypostasis as "subsistence") can be read here, or in pages 366–368 here.) However, unlike Zeno's Henotikon, this one contained no ambiguities. After summarising the faith, it concluded with the emperor entreating his subjects to avoid "unnecessary disputes about persons and words", since the different terminologies ultimately "lead to one true belief and understanding". The terms of reunion with Miaphysites had never been spelled out more clearly. Although some Miaphysite leaders accepted Justin's reunion, such as Paul the Black of Antioch, the majority of them rejected it. By this point, the sloganeering against Chalcedon, the existence of a parallel Miaphysite church, and the painful memories of their leaders' exiles all made any compromise with the Chalcedonians seem like a betrayal. Seeing that diplomacy would not work, Justin tried forcing the Miaphysites to accept his union.

Meanwhile, the Miaphysite movement was increasingly splintering into factions. The most moderate faction was called the Severians or Theodosians. Another, more extreme sect was variously called the Julianists, Gaianites or Aphthartodocetae. By the end of the 6th century, there were about twenty Miaphysite sects, including the tritheists (like John Philoponus and Theodora's grandson Athanasius), the Akephaloi (who rejected the Henotikon and broke off in 482), the Dioscorians (who rejected every pope since Dioscorus's death in 454), the Agnoetai, and other sects which Timothy of Constantinople described. This made reconciliation talks extremely difficult, since even the most respected Miaphysite leaders, like Theodosius or Jacob Baradaeus, could not speak on behalf of the entire movement. Additionally, each sect claimed to be the true heirs of the Miaphysite tradition, and they sought to prove their claim by outdoing each other in rejecting Chalcedon.

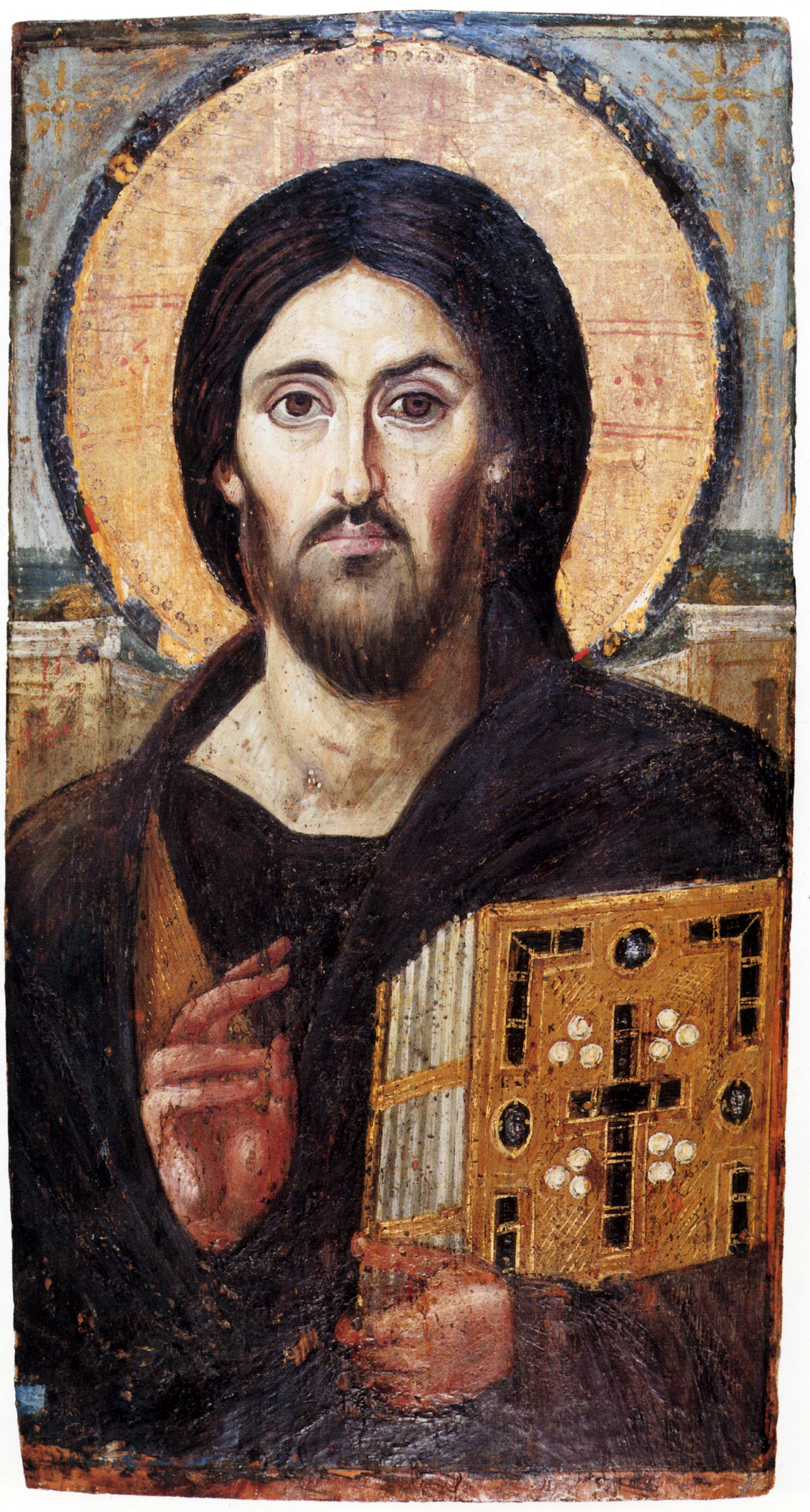
Icon of Christ Pantocrator from Saint Catherine's Monastery in Sinai, painted in Constantinople in the mid-6th century. The icon represents the two natures of Christ, illustrating traits of both man and God.

Paul the Black, who in 564 was ordained by Theodosius as the Patriarch of Antioch, was expelled from his see by Syrian tritheists who saw him as a representative of the Theodosians. He took refuge with the Ghassanid phylarchs al-Harith and al-Mundhir, then in 567 he went to Egypt and ordained Theodore of Rhamnis in Scetes as its next Patriarch. However, the Egyptians were unhappy with his selection and instead ordained Peter, whom Jacob Baradaeus recognised as the legitimate Pope of Alexandria. This resulted in a schism (and even bloodshed) within the Miaphysite movement between the supporters of Jacob and Paul, and later between the Miaphysite patriarchates of Alexandria and Antioch.

After John Scholasticus' death in 577 and Justin's in 578, the imperial restrictions against Miaphysites were relaxed by the next emperor, Tiberius. He was in turn succeeded by Maurice, who used force, persuasion and diplomatic skill to outmanoeuvre the Miaphysites. In 584, he abolished the Ghassanid "phylarchy", depriving the Miaphysites of their most powerful political supporters. He also expanded the Byzantine Empire's influence in Armenia and the Caucasus, turning the Georgian catholicosate of Mtskheta towards Chalcedonianism and effecting a temporary union with the Armenians. Maurice's cousin, Bishop Domitian of Melitene, is remembered by the Miaphysites as a stern persecutor.

The division and persecution of the Coptic Church in the late 6th century severely weakened it, allowing the Chalcedonian patriarchs of Alexandria to exert much greater influence over the Egyptians than their Miaphysite counterparts. For example, Patriarch Eulogius of Alexandria controlled both the religious and, when necessary, the civil administration of Egypt. In the spirit of Justin II's "program", he was largely accommodating of the Miaphysites. However, they were persecuted by his successor Theodore, who was appointed by Maurice's murderer Phocas. By this time, the Chalcedonian Schism had solidified along ethnic lines. Michael the Syrian's vocabulary shows that the word 'Greek' was equated with 'Chalcedonian', and 'Coptic' or 'Syrian' with 'Miaphysite'.

=== Heraclius ===
In 608, the Exarch of Africa Heraclius the Elder, with help from the Blues and Greens, began a popular revolt against Phocas known as the Heraclian revolt. He conquered Egypt from Phocas' government and appointed his nephew Nicetas as its governor. Heraclius the Elder's son Heraclius then defeated Phocas and became the new emperor. Patriarch Theodore was killed in the Heraclian revolt, so in 612 Heraclius replaced him with John the Merciful on the recommendation of Nicetas.

Sasanian territories at their greatest extent in 621

Between 604 and 621, the Persian Shah Khosrow II invaded the entire eastern region of the Byzantine Empire, taking Osroene, Syria, Palestine, Egypt, and much of Asia Minor. The Persians tended to favour the Miaphysites over the Chalcedonians; they massacred 44 Chalcedonian monks at the lavra of St Sabas, and transported the Chalcedonian Patriarch Zacharias of Jerusalem, along with portions of the True Cross and 35,000 other prisoners, to Ctesiphon. Miaphysite and Nestorian bishops often accompanied the Persian army, replacing Chalcedonian bishops who were expelled by the Persians. Khosrow's wife was the Miaphysite Shirin, and on two occasions he sent elaborate gifts to the Miaphysite shrine of Saint Sergius in Circesium. When the Persians invaded Syria in 614, Athanasius of Antioch wrote to Anastasius of Alexandria that "The world rejoiced in peace and love, because the Chalcedonian night has been chased away." However, the Persian occupation quickly became unpopular among the Miaphysites because, in an attempt to balance the interests of his Nestorian and Miaphysite subjects, Khosrow appointed Nestorian bishops in cities like Edessa.

Meanwhile, in Egypt, John's almsgiving towards the poor and the refugees of the Persian invasions was so generous that, after his death, even the Miaphysite Copts venerated him as a saint. (Note: Ibn Kabar gives his feast day as 14 Paopi. But the Greek Menaia and Ethiopian Synaxarium instead have 15 Hathor, which is 11 November.) He was also well-known for his mercy towards the Miaphysites, many of whom he converted. During his patriarchate, the number of Chalcedonian churches in Alexandria increased from seven to seventy. In 616, Nicetas managed to reconcile the Miaphysite patriarchs Athanasius of Antioch and Anastasius of Alexandria with one another, finally ending the schism between them. When the Persians invaded Egypt in 618, they massacred Copts and Greeks alike, singling out the Coptic monks at the Enaton for their wealth. Bishop Pisentius of Coptos wrote to his diocesans "Because of our sins, God has forgotten us, and has delivered us into the hands of these nations without mercy".

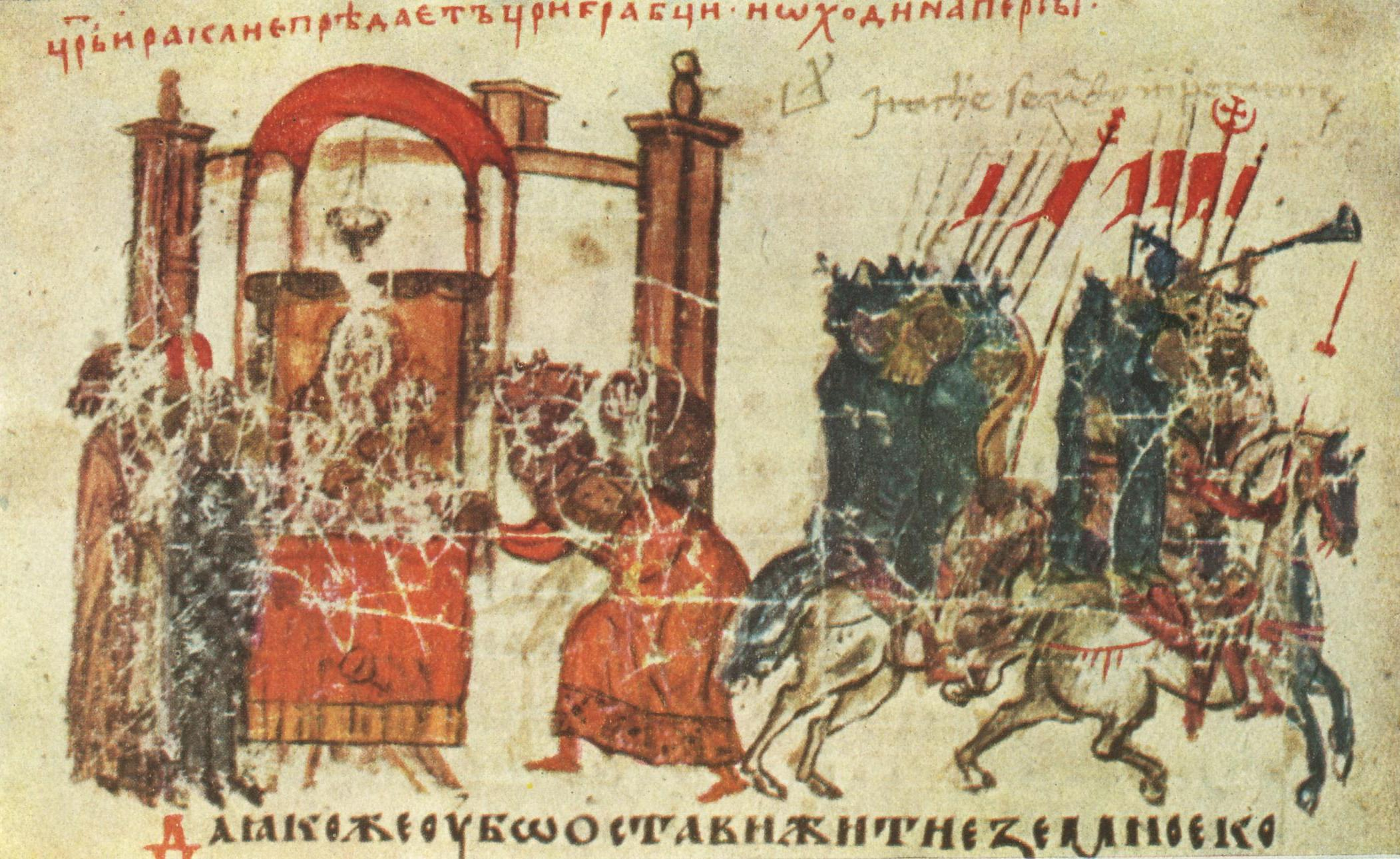
Heraclius (centre) venerates an icon of the Theotokos before campaigning against the Persians. Scene from the 12th century Manasses Chronicle.

Heraclius' reconquest of the eastern provinces in 627–628 was thus welcomed and celebrated even by the Miaphysites. Both sides of the Byzantine–Sasanian War saw it as a religious struggle between Christianity and Zoroastrianism. For the first time, the Byzantine army marched into battle carrying icons of Christ and the Virgin for protection. In particular, Heraclius' recovery of the True Cross in 630 made him a hero to the entire Christian world for centuries. To this day, the Copts celebrate the Feast of the Cross twice a year: once to commemorate its discovery by Constantine and Helena, and once to commemorate its recovery by Heraclius.

While he was liberating the East, Heraclius left Constantinople in the hands of his good friend, the Patriarch Sergius. In 626, when Constantinople was besieged by Khosrow and his allies the Slavs and Avars, Sergius kept the soldiers' and peasants' morale high with his religious fervour. The failure of the siege was attributed to the special protection of the Virgin Mary, particularly associated with her church near Blachernae and the icon of her that was kept there. Although the Akathist Hymn to the Theotokos may be older, the popularity of its Kontakion, which praises Mary as a "victorious general" (Greek: ὑπέρμαχος στρατηγός), dates back to this siege.

==== Monoenergism ====
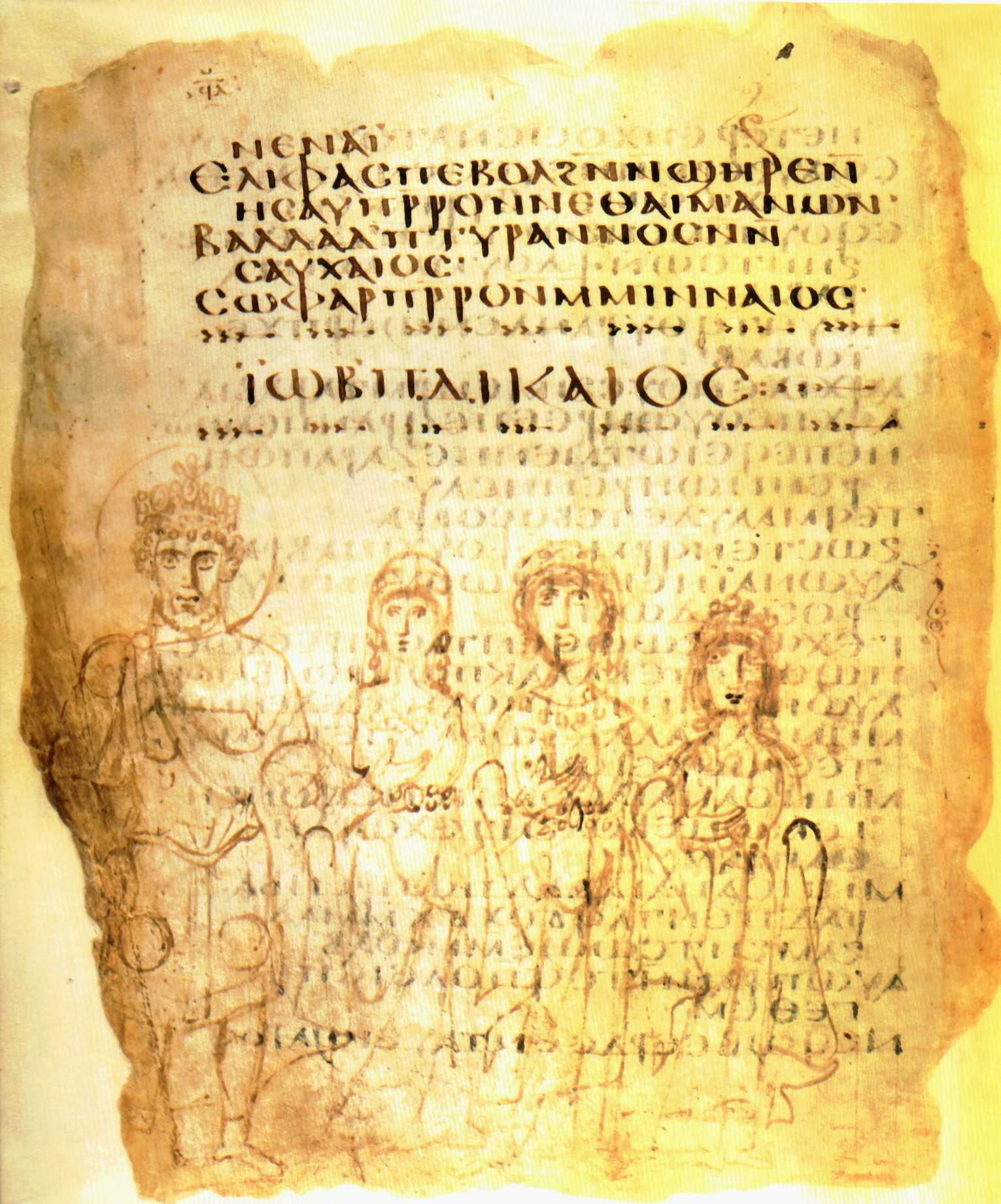
An early 7th-century drawing of Heraclius (left) and his family as Job, on a 5th-century Coptic manuscript. (Note: The artist very likely used pre-existing portraits of Heraclius and his family. Heraclius is noted as being similar to how he is described in literary sources and how he appears in his early coinage.)

Heraclius and Sergius, like almost all their predecessors, sought to end the Chalcedonian Schism. However, their attempts were not based on edicts like Zeno's and Justin II's. Instead, Sergius formulated a doctrine called Monoenergism that he believed was the natural conclusion of Chalcedon and Constantinople II: that Christ has two natures but one divine-human energy (Greek: μία θεανδρικὴ ἐνέργεια), (Note: The Greek word ἐνέργεια is not similar in meaning to the usual senses of the English word 'energy'. A clearer translation would be 'activity' or 'impulse of action') and that his will belonged to his one hypostasis. Severus of Antioch had accepted the "two natures divided in thought alone" formula, but stressed that Christ has one agent (ἐνεργών) and one activity (ἐνέργεια). Since Constantinople II had also accepted the "in thought alone" formula, it was logical to conclude that Monoenergism was in line with Chalcedonian Orthodoxy.

Sergius had been promoting Monoenergism possibly as early as 615–617, but he and Heraclius were so well-respected and trusted by the Christian world that their doctrine's agreement with Chalcedon went unchallenged for nearly two decades. By 622, Sergius had convinced Heraclius of Monoenergism. In 626, when Heraclius was in Lazica, he met the local Metropolitan Cyrus of Phasis and converted him to Monoenergism, as well as Ezr (Esras) the Catholicos of Armenia. Later, in 633, Ezr convened a council in Theodosiopolis that officially marked the acceptance of Monoenergism by the Armenian Church. However, Monoenergism was less successful in Egypt and Syria. When Heraclius published an encyclical about it to the Miaphysites, Patriarch Athanasius responded by simply reiterating their objections to Chalcedon. Heraclius invited him to a conference in Hierapolis, where Cyrus of Phasis personally tried to persuade him of Monoenergism, but their debates were ended by Athanasius' untimely death in July 631. Despite this, many of Syria's major Chalcedonian and Miaphysite monasteries did accept Monoenergism.

In autumn 631, Heraclius appointed Cyrus as both the Patriarch and governor of Egypt, an exceptional and non-canonical combination of roles. (Note: Although Cyrus was often called the "governor of Egypt" by his contemporaries, it is unclear whether he officially held a title like dux et augustalis Alexandriae. More likely, he became the de facto governor of Egypt through an imperial commission that granted him immense secular authority.) Cyrus wrote a list of anathemas known as the Nine Chapters (κεφάλαια) of which the seventh was a bold assertion of Monoenergism. For the next ten years, he tried to convert the Copts to Monoenergism through persecution, imprisonment, torture and mutilation. He had Coptic priests put to death wherever they were discovered, and appointed Chalcedonian bishops in every Egyptian city up to Ansena. The Coptic Pope Benjamin went into hiding, and was relentlessly pursued by Cyrus. By 3 June 633, when an official union was celebrated, Cyrus' heavy-handed methods seem to have succeeded in (temporarily) making the majority of Alexandria's Copts accept Chalcedon and the Nine Chapters.

In 633, Cyrus showed the Nine Chapters to an elderly monk named Sophronius, who was immediately horrified by what he saw the "doctrines of Apollinaris" in the seventh chapter. He travelled to Constantinople to raise his objections to Sergius in person. In response, Sergius cited the union that Monoenergism had achieved between the Chalcedonians, Miaphysites and Nestorians. He then challenged Sophronius to produce evidence from the Bible or the Fathers attributing "two energies" to Christ. Sophronius left Constantinople in defeat.

==== Monothelitism ====
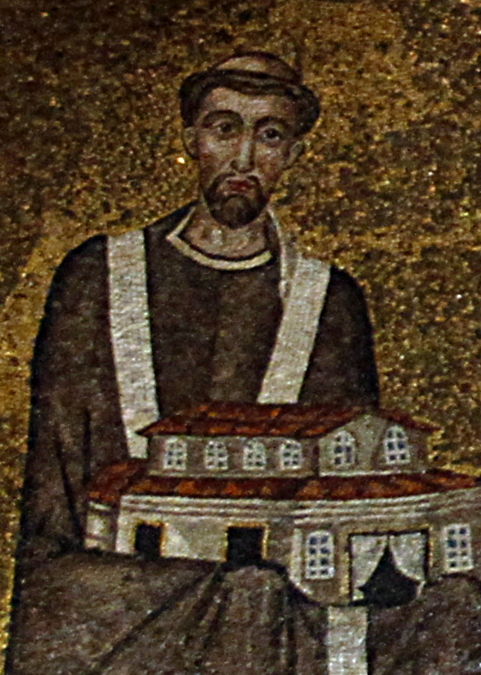
A contemporary mosaic of Pope Honorius at Saint Agnes Outside the Walls

Sergius was affected by Sophronius' arguments against Monoenergism, so he published the Psephos, in which he stated that the talk of "one" or "two" energies was divisive, and that the correct phrasing was that in Christ there was one Divine will operating in two natures. This doctrine is known as Monothelitism. Sergius also wrote to Pope Honorius about the Psephos and union he had achieved, hoping to gain his approval. Honorius evidently felt that Monoenergism was heretical, but wanted to maintain a good relationship with Sergius, so in his response he praised him for his achievements, but cautioned him against inventing new doctrines. However, in his attempt to turn Sergius away from Monoenergism, Honorius explicitly confessed Monothelitism, writing "Therefore, we confess the one will of our Lord Jesus Christ".

In 634, Sophronius was elected as the Patriarch of Jerusalem. As was customary, he sent a Synodical Letter to the other four patriarchs asking for recognition. However, in his letter he offered the first theological critique of Monoenergism, arguing that "to each nature corresponds a proper energy", and that those who believe in only "one, unique, essential, natural and undifferentiated energy" in Christ essentially believe in one essence and one nature. (Note: Sophronius' Synodical Letter can be read in its original Greek and Latin beginning from page 186 here, or in English here.) In response, Sergius and the abbot Pyrrhus drafted the Ecthesis, which was published by Heraclius in 638, and explicitly defined Monothelitism as the official faith of the empire. Honorius died shortly afterwards, without having expressed his opinion on the Ecthesis. Sergius also soon died and was succeeded by Pyrrhus.

=== Muslim invasions ===
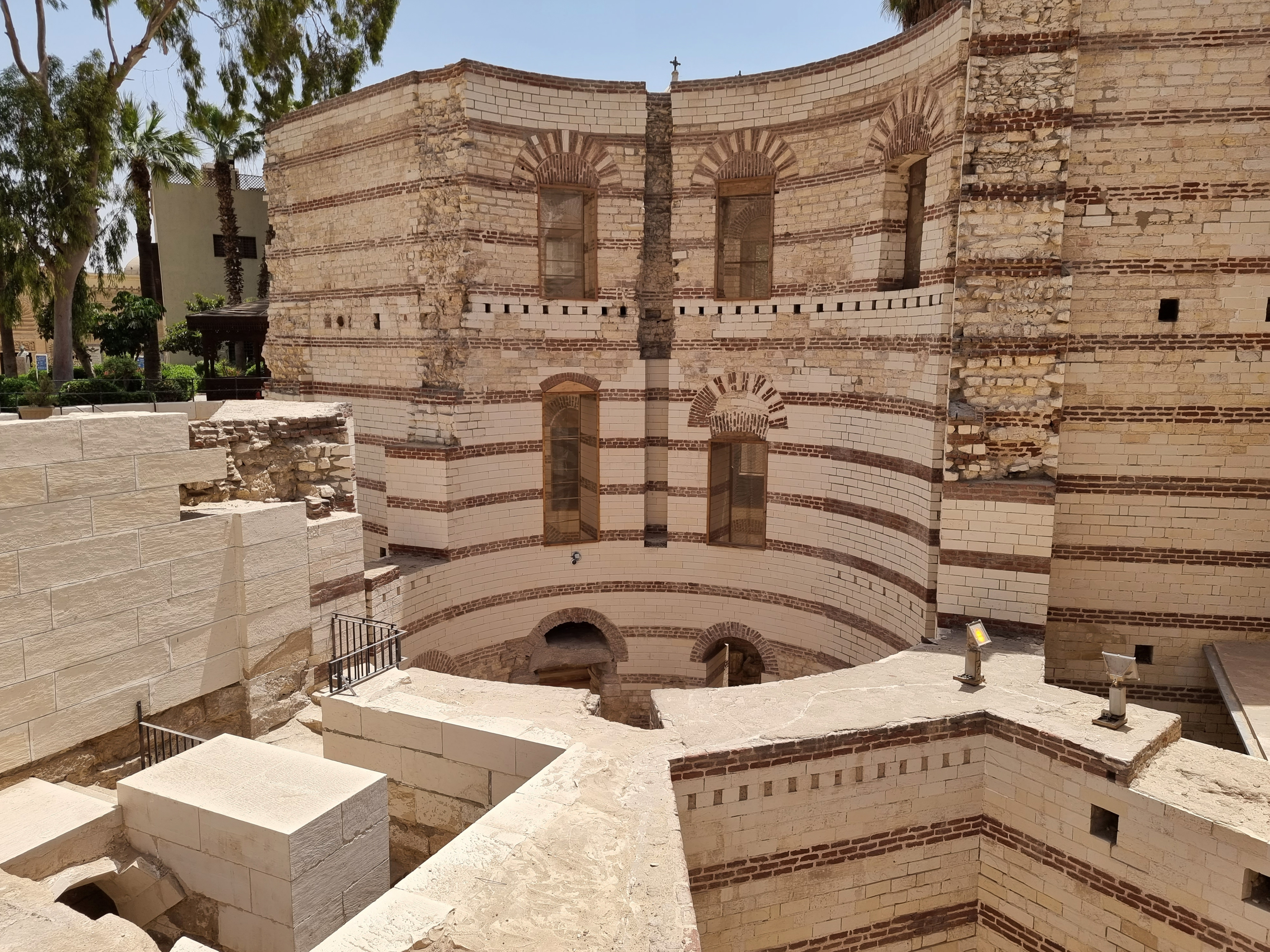
Ruins of the Babylon Fortress in Egypt

Meanwhile, Sophronius was occupied defending Jerusalem from an Arab siege. After about 6 months, when it became clear that the city could no longer hold out, he surrendered it to them. From 639 to 642, the Muslims also invaded Egypt. Its governor, who was still Cyrus, repeatedly sabotaged the Byzantine defence of the country, such as by signing secret treaties of surrender with the Arabs. He also continued his policy of persecuting the Copts, allowing Coptic prisoners to be tortured in the Babylon Fortress even while it was being besieged by Arabs. In frustration, Heraclius had him recalled to Constantinople, where he angrily insulted him and threatened to kill him, then had him exiled.

With Heraclius' death in 641, his two sons Constantine III and the 15-year-old Heraclonas became co-emperors, as stipulated in his will. But Constantine III suddenly became ill and died after a reign of only three months. Heraclonas' mother Martina was widely suspected of poisoning him so that her son could be the sole emperor. After six months, Martina and Heraclonas were overthrown by the general Valentinus, who placed Constantine III's 10-year-old son Constans II on the throne. Amidst this chaotic succession crisis, Cyrus was recalled from exile and restored as the governor of Egypt, where he continued to persecute the Copts and surrender to the Muslims. Cyrus died on 21 March 642, and on 29 September Amr ibn al-As rode into Alexandria at the head of his army, marking the end of Roman Egypt.

With the Miaphysite strongholds of Egypt and Syria now under Muslim rule, contact between Chalcedonians and non-Chalcedonians was almost completely severed, so both the Chalcedonian and Nestorian schisms were fossilised for centuries. Through persecution, Christians in the Middle East were reduced to dhimmi and gradually Arabised, with their churches often marked by submissiveness and loyalty to the Muslim government. According to Fr John Meyendorff's analysis, this effect was particularly devasting for the Copts. They had inherited from pharaonic civilisation a characteristic sense of superiority, which was only strengthened by the global influence of Coptic popes like Athanasius and Cyril. (Note: The Popes of Alexandria even used the title "Judge of the universe" (κριτὴς τῆς οἰκουμένης), which remains in use today by both the Coptic Orthodox and Greek Orthodox Popes of Alexandria.) However, after being cut off from the outside world, they lost the sense that they were part of a global church, and their popes were reduced to local ethnarchs of Egypt's dwindling Christian minority.

=== Third Council of Constantinople ===
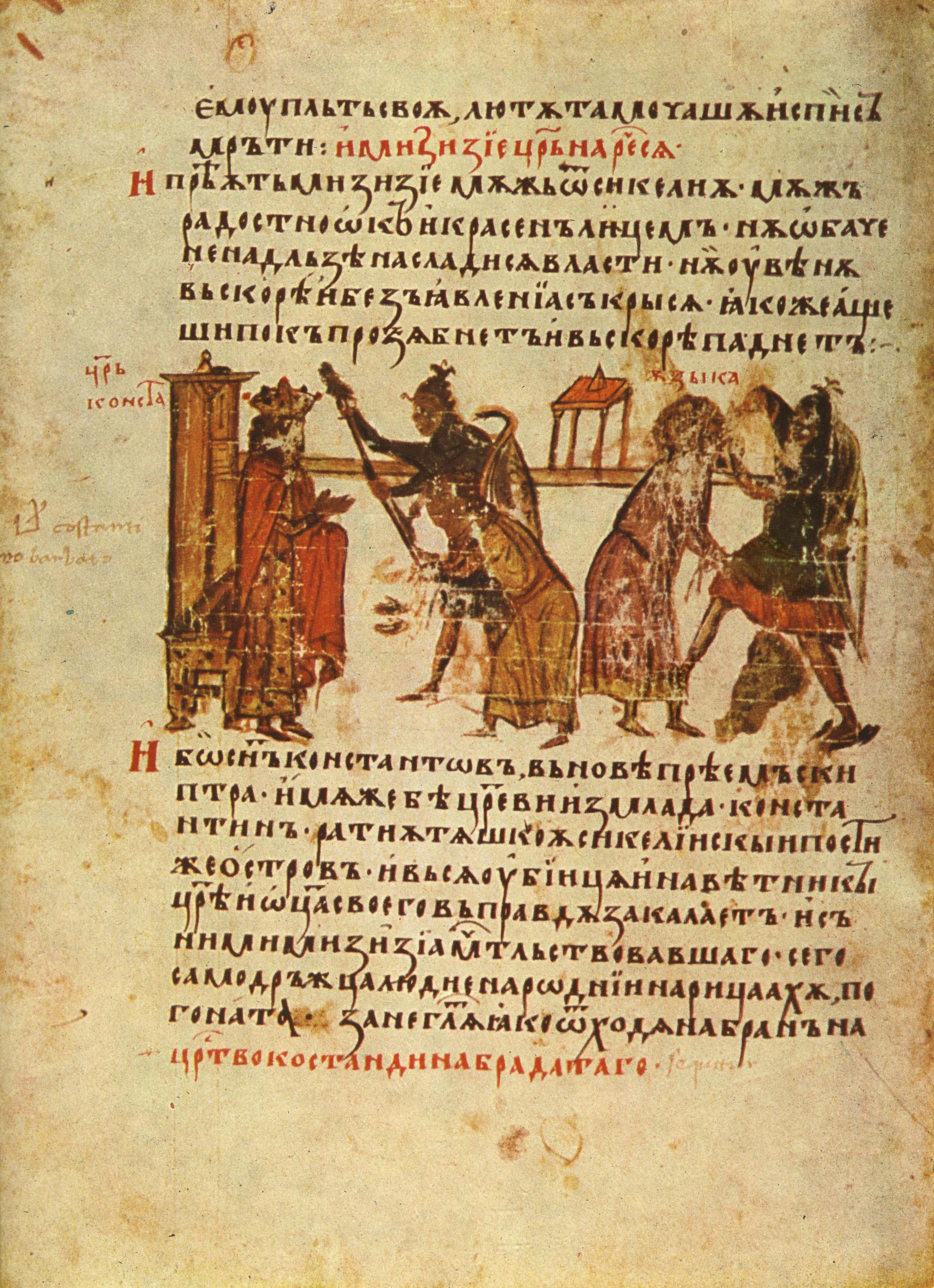
Maximus the Confessor being tortured on the orders of Constans II. Miniature from the 12th century Manasses Chronicle.

Monothelitism, the last major attempt at compromise between the Chalcedonians and non-Chalcedonians, would remain controversial for decades. Honorius' successors Severinus, John IV, Theodore and Martin all rejected Monothelitism, while the patriarchs of Constantinople Sergius, Pyrrhus and Paul accepted it. But the most notable opponent of Monothelitism was a monk known as Maximus the Confessor, who had been a disciple of Sophronius, and who was able to brilliantly express the flaws of Monothelitism. The emperor Constans II tried to silence critics of Monothelitism by decreeing the Typos of Constans, which forbade "any discussion of one will or one energy, two wills or two energies". In response, Pope Martin gathered about 105 bishops at the Lateran Council of 649, where they anathematised both the Ecthesis and the Typos of Constans. Maximus the Confessor wrote the council's canons, which confessed two energies and two wills in Christ.

Furious at this defiance to his decree, Constans II had the Exarch of Ravenna Theodore Calliopas arrest Pope Martin and take him to Constantinople, where he was imprisoned for three months then exiled to Kherson in Crimea. Later, in 655, Maximus and his two disciples were also arrested and sent to Constantinople, where they were tried as heretics by the patriarchs Peter of Constantinople and Macedonius of Antioch. For years, they were variously imprisoned, exiled, tortured, and offered pardons and riches, but they adamantly refused to accept Monothelitism. Maximus' tongue was cut out so he could no longer speak his rebellion, and his right hand was cut off so that he could no longer write letters. He was then exiled to Lazica, where he died in 662.

The Monothelite controversy continued until, in 679, Emperor Constantine IV invited Pope Donus to a conference to reunite the churches of Rome and Constantinople. Pope Donus was dead by the time the letter arrived, but his successor Agatho received it and agreed. He had local synods held all over the West, such as the Council of Hatfield in England, to discuss Monothelitism, and they unanimously condemned it. Thus backed by the entire Western episcopate, Pope Agatho sent a Roman delegation to Constantinople to attend the conference. They met in a domed hall in the Great Palace called the Troullon. In its first session, the conference declared itself an ecumenical council. After eighteen sessions of debate, they confessed Dyothelitism (two wills in Christ) and anathematised Monothelite leaders, including Theodore of Pharan, (Note: Probably the same person as Theodore of Raithu) Sergius, Cyrus, Honorius, (Note: As one of only three popes (alongside Liberius and Vigilius) to be condemned for heresy, Pope Honorius' condemnation by the council is often cited in debates on papal infallibility) Pyrrhus, Paul, Peter, and Macarius. Thus ended the last major imperial attempt at compromise between the Chalcedonians and non-Chalcedonians.

== Modern dialogue ==
Although Constantinople was essentially cut off from Egypt and Syria by the Muslim conquests, it stayed in close contact with Armenia, which allowed for several more attempts to repair the schism. The Byzantines and Armenians achieved temporary unions after Justin II's Second Henotikon in 571, the Council of Thedosioupolis in 632, the Council of Shirakavan in 862, and the Council of Hromkla in 1179. In 1439–1445, the Council of Florence (which aimed to reunite the Catholic and Eastern Orthodox Churches) received delegations from the Armenian, Coptic, Ethiopian and Syriac Orthodox Churches, and published several bulls announcing reunion with those churches. However, none of those unions proved lasting.

In 1964, the Faith and Order Commission of the World Council of Churches organised an informal meeting between Eastern and Oriental Orthodox theologians in Aarhus, Denmark. Three more unofficial dialogues were held in Bristol in 1967, Geneva in 1970, and Addis Ababa in 1971. The success of these ecumenical dialogues led to the foundation of the Joint Commission of the Theological Dialogue Between the Orthodox Church and the Oriental Orthodox Churches, which conducted four official dialogues in 1985, 1989, 1990 and 1993. Like the Byzantines who attempted to repair the schism centuries before, the Joint Commission used the Cyrillian formulas "one nature of God the Word incarnate" and "two natures divided in thought alone" to establish common ground between both sides of the schism. The Second Agreed Statement, adopted by the 1990 meeting of the Joint Commission, concluded that the Eastern and Oriental Orthodox Churches held the same faith, with their differences being merely over terminology, not belief. It proposed the lifting of the mutual anathemas between the Eastern and Oriental Orthodox Churches.

The Joint Commission's proposals were accepted by the Eastern Orthodox Churches of Alexandria, Antioch, Romania and Serbia, and by the Oriental Orthodox Churches of Alexandria, Antioch and Malankara-India. However, a group of Athonite monks expressed concerns about the dialogue, particularly the possibility of full communion being re-established between the Eastern and Oriental Orthodox without the latter accepting the Council of Chalcedon.

Ecumenical dialogue has also developed between the Catholic and Oriental Orthodox Churches since the Second Vatican Council. 1964 also saw the establishment of Pro Oriente, a Catholic foundation aiming to improve relations with the Oriental Orthodox Churches. In 1973, to celebrate the return of part of Saint Mark's relics to Egypt, Pope Paul VI and Pope Shenouda III of Alexandria published a joint declaration of faith. Since 2003, the Joint International Commission for Theological Dialogue between the Catholic Church and the Oriental Orthodox Churches has held regular dialogues between the Oriental Orthodox and Catholic Churches.

== Analysis ==
Since antiquity, the perceived similarity of the Eastern and Oriental Orthodox positions, and the reliance of both on Saint Cyril of Alexandria, has led many to argue that they differ only in semantics, not theology. Cyril himself wrote several letters explaining why the 433 Formula of Reunion, which spoke of two natures, did not contradict his own formula "one nature of God the Word incarnate". When Archbishop Basil of Seleucia coined the phrase "in two natures" at the 448 synod in Constantinople, he specifically connected it to Cyril's writings. He continued to insist at both the Second Council of Ephesus and the Council of Chalcedon that confessing Christ "in two natures" is synonymous with using Cyril's formula. (Note: As Basil explained at Chalcedon: If you say "one nature" after the union without qualification, you imply confusion and mixture; if, however, you add [to the phrase] "enfleshed and made man", and understand taking flesh and becoming man just as the most blessed Cyril did, then you say the same as we do. For it is clear that his Godhead from the Father is one thing and the manhood from his mother another) The 6th-century chronicler Evagrius Scholasticus also argued that, although "in two natures" and "from two natures" were perfectly compatible formulas, it was through "the device of the envious and God-hating demon" that the Church was so bitterly divided over a single letter (ἐν vs ἐκ). Since the Second Council of Constantinople in 553, the official dogma of the Catholic and Eastern Orthodox churches has been that, as Cyril and Severus argued, both "one nature of God the Word incarnate" and "two natures divided in thought alone" are valid descriptions of the nature of Christ.

The rejection of Chalcedon has often been attributed to nationalistic feelings among ethnic minorities in the Greek-dominated Byzantine Empire. While this is arguably true in the case of Armenia, historians overwhelmingly agree that it was not so in Egypt and Syria. They remained deeply loyal to the empire even while being persecuted by it, their leaders continuing to pray for its victory and for the emperor. Furthermore, the idea that the Roman Empire "came from God", (Note: As the metropolitan and bishops of Myra stated in Leo's plebiscite) and that its emperor was divinely appointed to lead it in both secular and religious matters, was deeply ingrained at the time. (Note: This concept was challenged only a few times in Byzantine history. In his frustration against Constantius II, Pope Athanasius of Alexandria wrote "What concern had the Emperor with it? ... When did a judgment of the Church receive its validity from the Emperor?" This letter, History of the Arians, was private enough for him to instruct its readers not to make or distribute copies of it. Similarly, in his letter to Constantius, Hosius of Corduba tells him "God has put into your hands the kingdom; to us He has entrusted the affairs of His Church", and warns him that it would be a "great offence" to interfere in ecclesiastical matters. During his trial in 655, Maximus the Confessor told Constans II to his face that emperors were laymen and not priests, and therefore had no right to debate dogma. Historian Phil Booth describes this as "an unprecedented challenge to the political culture of the Constantinopolitan court".) Individual emperors were often vilified by both sides, but the imperial institution was still considered sacred, and rebellion or secession from it was almost unthinkable. The historian W. H. C. Frend wrote that, despite their differences with the state church, the Copts and Syrians "remained at heart Byzantines" for centuries after the Muslim conquest, and they continue to pray in Greek to this day.

== Sources ==
- Amélineau, Émile (1887). Un évêque de Keft au VIIe siècle.
- * Booth, Phil (2017). "Maximos the Confessor". In Kaldellis, Anthony; Siniossoglou, Niketas (eds.). The Cambridge Intellectual History of Byzantium. Cambridge University Press. pp. 414–430. doi:10.1017/9781107300859.025.
- Brock, S. P. (1996). "The 'Nestorian' Church: a lamentable misnomer" (PDF). Bulletin of the John Rylands Library. 78 (3): 23–35. doi:10.7227/bjrl.78.3.3.
- Butler, Albert J. (1903). The Arab Conquest of Egypt and the Last Thirty Years under Roman Dominion (PDF). Oxford University Press. ISBN 1724498029.
- Cyril of Alexandria (2013) [434–438]. "First Letter of Cyril to Succensus". Translated by McGuckin, Fr John.
- Frend, William (1972). The Rise of the Monophysite Movement. BoD – Books on Demand. ISBN 978-0227172414.
- Ibrahim, Michael (31 January 2021). "Navigating Chalcedon: A 21st Century Oriental Orthodox Perspective". YouTube.
- Kazhdan, Alexander (1991). Oxford Dictionary of Byzantium. Vol. I. Oxford University Press.
- Jones, A. H. M.; Martindale, J. R; Morris, John (1992). The Prosopography of the Later Roman Empire. Vol. III: A.D. 527–641. Oxford University Press. ISBN 978-0-521-20160-5.
- Maspero, Jean (1923). Histoire des Patriarches D'alexandrie. Librairie Ancienne Edouard Champion.
- MET: "Drawing of Job and His Family Represented as Heraclius and His Family". New York: Metropolitan Museum of Art.
- Meyendorff, John (1989). Imperial unity and Christian divisions: The Church, AD 450–680. St. Vladimir's Seminary Press. ISBN 978-0881410556.
- Price, Richard (2009). The Acts of the Council of Constantinople of 553 (PDF). Liverpool University Press. ISBN 978-1-84631-178-9.
- Price, Richard; Gaddis, Michael (2007). The Acts of the Council of Chalcedon (PDF). Liverpool University Press. ISBN 978-1-84631-100-0. Archived from the original (PDF) on 2014-02-11.
- Scholasticus, Evagrius (1846) [593]. Ecclesiastical History (431–594 AD), Book 2. Translated by Walford, Edward.
- Scholasticus, Evagrius (1844) [593]. Evagrii Scholastici Epiphaniensis et ex praefectis ecclesiasticae historiae (in Greek).
- Schwartz, Eduard (1933) [451]. Acta Conciliorum Oecumenicorum. Concilium Universale Chalcedonensis.
- Spatharakis, Iohannis (1976). The portrait in Byzantine illuminated manuscripts. Brill Archive. ISBN 90-04-04783-2.
- Syrus, Michael (1871) [1195]. The Chronicle of Michael the Great, Patriarch of the Syrians (PDF). Translated by Bedrosian, Robert.
- Weitzmann, Kurt (1979). Age of Spirituality: Late Antique and Early Christian Art, Third to Seventh Century. Metropolitan Museum of Art. ISBN 0-87099-179-5.
- Wickham, Lionel (1983). Cyril of Alexandria Select Letters. Clarendon Press. ISBN 978-0198268109.
