= Christopher II =

Christopher II may refer to:

- Christopher II of Armenia, the Catholicos of Armenia 628 to 630
- Patriarch Christopher II of Alexandria, ruled in 1939–1966
- Christopher II of Denmark (1276–1332), king of Denmark from 1320 to 1326 and again from 1329 to 1332
- Christopher II, Margrave of Baden-Rodemachern (1537–1575), margrave of Baden-Rodemachern from 1556 to 1575
- Christopher II, Burgrave and Count of Dohna-Schlodien (1702–1762)
