= Hovnan Mayravanetsi =

Armenian theologian and philosopher

Hovnan Mayravanetsi ( Also John of Mairogom, Armenian: Հովհան Մայրավանեցի, c. 572-650) was an Armenian theologian and philosopher, and ardent defender of Miaphysite position of the Armenian Church.

In 631, when Catholicos Ezra I returned from the Council of Thedosioupolis (Carin), called by Emperor Heraclius, he dissented to the capitulation of Ezra and his delegation, who had sided with the Chalcedonian doctrine of the Byzantines on the nature of Christ. Ezra had him banished and after further persecution he escaped to Caucasian Albania, where he was able to gather a large number of followers.

He was one of the first theologians to address issues of social justice in the light of the Christian teaching, which set him on a collision course with his contemporary feudal socioeconomic structures. In his later years he had become an ascetic.
