= Ezra of Armenia =

Catholicos of Armenia

Catholicos Ezra (Եզր Ա Փառաժնակերտցի) was the Catholicos-Patriarch of the Armenian Apostolic Church between 630 and 641.

Ezra came from Paraznakert in the province of Nig (now Aparan). Early in his reign the Byzantine-Sasanian war was coming to the end, with famously Byzantine Emperor Heraclius returning the True Cross to Jerusalem. He was a Chalcedonian, and wanted unanimity among all Christians, including the Armenians who were non-Chalcedonian (Miaphysites).

In 631, one of Heraclius generals, Mjej Gnuni, summoned Ezra to meet with the Emperor and accept the Chalcedonian doctrine, and threatened him "Otherwise we shall get ourselves another Catholicos".

After promise of safe passage from the Emperor, Ezra led a delegation of Armenians to a council called by Heraclius in Carin (Council of Thedosioupolis) where he capitulated to the Emperor, accepting the Chalcedonian position, effectively burying the doctrinal differences between the Armenian church and the Byzantines. He was trying to avoid a schism that could give the emperor a reason to appoint a rival Catholicos as had happened in 593 with John of Bagaran appointed by Emperor Maurice. As a reward for his compliance, Ezra asked for the gift of the lucrative salt mine at Koghb (now Tuzluca), which the emperor gave him.

On his return to his palace at Dvin, the delegation had to explain the outcome of the council. The compromise was broadly accepted but one notable dissident, John had to be banished from the city. John was "the most accomplished theologian of his time", but he had not attended the council. After further persecution from Ezra, John (now called John of Mairagom, or Hovnan Mayravanetsi) accrued numerous followers who were based in Caucasian Albania, where they were out of Ezra's reach.

Ezra was involved in the building of the Saint Gayane Church in Etchmiadzin (now Vagharshapat), which still stands.

He died in 641, just as the Armenians were being confronted by the early Islamist invaders.

Preceded by Christopher II	Catholicos of the Holy See of St. Echmiadzin and All Armenians; 630–641	Succeeded by Nerses III (the Builder)
