= Mjej II Gnuni =

Armenian sparapet of Byzantine Armenia

Mzhezh or Mjej Gnuni (Armenian: Մժեժ Գնունի, Mžēž Gnuni), was an Armenian sparapet of Byzantine Armenia.

Initially serving under Heraclius, the contingent of Armenian troops under his command were instrumental in the Byzantine success against the Sassanids during the Byzantine-Persian Wars that culminated in the overthrow of Khosrau II in 628. He also served as the sparapet (commander in chief) of Byzantine Armenia from about 630 to 638, and during this time may have been responsible for the founding of the Cathedral of Mren. He was succeeded in this position by David Saharuni, from the middle-ranking Armenian nobility, after the latter was accused of plotting against the life of Heraclius. While being sent into exile, David escaped and made his way back to Armenia. There he raised an army, and slew Mžēž Gnuni, alongside his brother Varaz Gnel Gnuni.

Evidence of this is chronicled by Bishop Sebeos of the Bagratunis, such as "41:16 Also involved in that plot was Dawit’ Sahaṙuni, whom Mzhēzh arrested and sent to the palace. But on the way he cut his bonds and killed the men who were escorting him. He returned and united under his command the Armenian army. Attacking Mzhēzh Gnuni the Greek general, he defeated and killed both him and Varaz Gnel Gnuni. Then he took for himself command of the army with the agreement and support of all the troops." Account from the Manuscripts of Sebeos, Primary Source

He is also known to have approached the Armenian Catholicos Ezra for a union of the Armenian and Greek Churches, who initially refused, but later yielded to the menaces of the general.
