= Dyoenergism =

Christian doctrine that Jesus Christ has two "energies"

Dyoenergism (from Greek δυοενεργητισμός "two energies") is a Christological doctrine that teaches the existence of two energies—divine and human—in the person of Jesus Christ. Specifically, dyoenergism correlates the distinctiveness of two energies with the existence of two distinct natures (divine and human) in the person of Jesus Christ, the position known as dyophysitism.

== History ==
Dyoenergism stands in opposition to the view of monoenergism, which is the doctrine that Jesus has only one energy. Monoenergism was advocated for by Saint Dionysius. In contrast, dyoenergism teaches that Jesus Christ acts through two energies: divine and human. The Sixth Ecumenical Council, held in Constantinople in 680-681, reaffirmed dyoenergism as church doctrine and condemned both monoenergism and monothelitism, stating:

And as we recognize two natures, so also we recognize two natural wills and two natural operations [...] And, as has been said, we rejected and condemned that most impious and unsubstantial heresy which affirmed but one will and one operation in the incarnate Christ our true God.

The term energy is derived from the term energeia, which typically means "activity" or "operation",. More specifically, in the sense employed by Saint Maximus, a "natural, constitutive power," in other words, a capacity for a pattern of activity. The primary difference in the monoenergist controversy of the 5th and 6th centuries was whether energy is to be associated with person, which is one in Christ, or rather with his natures. Dyoenergism is based on dyophysitism ('as we recognize[...] so also we recognize') - each different nature corresponds to a different energeia, as expressed by St. Cyril of Alexandria: "No sensible person would concede that things different in kind and nature possess the same operation."

== Distinctions between doctrines ==
Similar Christological doctrines include dyophysitism and hypostatic union, both of which claim the presence of two natures within Jesus Christ – divine and human. Dyophysitism and hypostatic union differ from dyoenergism by placing emphasis on the physical form of Christ having two natures. Contrastly, dyoenergism emphasizes an internal element to Christ's divine and human natures. The language used to differentiate Christiological doctrines, such as this one, was debated among theologians, including Saint Maximus the Confessor. Maximus was a known dyothelite, or person of the Christian faith who believed in dyothelitism. He particularly uses terms such as “nature” versus “essence” and “person” versus “hypostasis” to clearly differentiate the definitions of doctrines and arguments for the presence of both divine and human natures of Christ.

Maximus was also a known follower of Neo-Chalcedonianism, “a mixed political–theological project initiated by Emperor Justinian a century before Maximus. It aimed to reconcile the adversaries to the Council of Chalcedon with the followers of the council, for both ecclesial and political reasons, namely the unity of church and empire.” Following these traditions also framed his arguments and guided his defense of dyoenergetic doctrines.

== See also ==
- Essence–energies distinction (Eastern Orthodox theology)
- Monoenergism
- Dyothelitism
- Dyophystism

== Sources ==
- Hovorun, Cyril (2008). Will, Action and Freedom: Christological Controversies in the Seventh Century. Leiden-Boston: BRILL. ISBN 978-9004166660.
- Meyendorff, John (1983). Byzantine Theology: Historical Trends and Doctrinal Themes (Revised 2 ed.). New York: Fordham University Press. ISBN 9780823209675.
- Meyendorff, John (1989). Imperial unity and Christian divisions: The Church 450-680 A.D. The Church in history. Vol. 2. Crestwood, NY: St. Vladimir's Seminary Press. ISBN 9780881410563.
- Ostrogorsky, George (1956). History of the Byzantine State. Oxford: Basil Blackwell.
