= Christopher II of Armenia =

Catholicos of Armenia from 628 to 630

Christopher II (Քրիստափոր Բ Ապահունի) was the Catholicos of Armenia from 628 through 630.

He was from a noble family in the province of Apahunik on the shore of Lake Van. According to the historian Sebeos: "he proved to be an arrogant and impious man whose tongue was as sharp as a sword". He seems to have been a strong moralist and called out the bad behaviour of high-ranking officials, which led to them attempting to oust him.

Accusations were brought against him and the bishops and princes of the land were assembled to undertake an investigation. Two men from Christopher's family came to the trial and testified against him, as he had caused strife amongst his brothers as well. Under the pressure from the prefect Varaztiroz and other nobles, Christopher resigned in 630. In his retirement he built a large convent at the foot of Mount Ararat, and lived out his final years as a monk.

Ezra from the district of Nig was quickly enthroned to replace him, who was said to have been a humble man, much the opposite of Christopher.

Preceded by Gomidas	Catholicos of the Holy See of St. Echmiadzin and All Armenians; 628–630	Succeeded by Ezra of Armenia
