= Council of Thedosioupolis =

7th century eastern church council

The Council of Thedosioupolis was a church synod held at Erzurum, in Armenia between February 631 and February 632 AD.

== Background ==
The Armenian Apostolic Church, being Monophysite, had rejected the theological decisions of the Council of Chalcedon at the Second Council of Dvin, creating a schism between Armenia and the churches of Rome, Byzantium, and Antioch.

In light of this divergence from the rest of Christianity, there were calls within Armenia for restoration with the Churches that had adopted Chalcedon's canons. The council was chaired by Cathilocos Ezra I, who called for reunification with the Eastern Orthodox Church. and Emperor Heraclius attended accompanied by both Armenian and Greek patriarchs. Under pressure, Ezra agreed to the accords, but the compromise was eventually rejected by recusants such as Hovnan Mayravanetsi. This rejection of the synod was part of the formation of schism between Armenian and Orthodox Christianity.

== Outcome ==
The Council ultimately rejected the calls for reunification, and many of the differences are still being negotiated today.

== See also ==
- Council of Theodosiopolis (593)
