= Jean-Luc Marion =

French philosopher (born 1946)

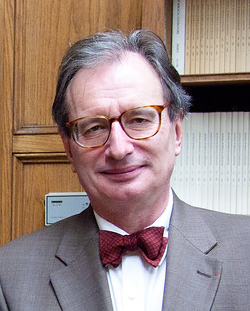
- Born: 3 July 1946 (age 80); Meudon, Hauts-de-Seine, France
- Spouse: Corinne Nicolas (m. 1970)
- Children: 2

Education
- Education: Lycée Condorcet; École normale supérieure University of Nanterre; University of Paris IV
- Thesis: Le fondement du savoir dans la pensée de Descartes (1980)
- Doctoral advisor: Ferdinand Alquié
- Other advisors: Louis Althusser; Gilles Deleuze; Jacques Derrida

Philosophical work
- Era: Contemporary philosophy
- Region: Western philosophy
- School: Continental philosophy; Phenomenology; Postmodernism; Christian philosophy
- Institutions: University of Paris IV
- Doctoral students: Camille Riquier
- Main interests: Philosophical theology, history of philosophy
- Notable ideas: "As much reduction, as much givenness," saturated phenomenon, the intentionality of love, counter-experience

Jean-Luc Marion (French: [ʒɑ̃ lyk maʁjɔ̃]; born 3 July 1946) is a French philosopher and Catholic theologian. His work is informed by patristic and mystical theology, phenomenology, and modern philosophy.

Much of his academic work has dealt with Descartes and phenomenologists like Martin Heidegger and Edmund Husserl, but also religion. God Without Being, for example, is concerned predominantly with an analysis of idolatry, a theme strongly linked in Marion's work with love and the gift, which is a concept also explored at length by Derrida.

== Biography ==
=== Early years ===
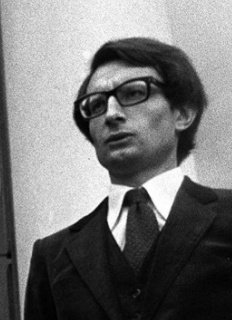
Jean-Luc Marion at the Élysée Palace after his meeting with President Valéry Giscard d'Estaing on Thursday 7 September 1978

Marion was born in Meudon, Hauts-de-Seine, on 3 July 1946.

He studied at the École normale supérieure in Paris from 1967 to 1971, where he was taught by Jacques Derrida, Louis Althusser and Gilles Deleuze. At the same time, Marion's deep interest in theology was privately cultivated under the personal influence of theologians such as Louis Bouyer, Jean Daniélou, Henri de Lubac, and Hans Urs von Balthasar.

He then studied at the University of Nanterre and earned a doctorate from the University of Paris IV in 1974.

From 1972 to 1980 he studied for his doctorate and worked as an assistant lecturer at the Sorbonne. After receiving his doctorate in 1980, he began teaching at the University of Poitiers.

=== Career ===
From there he moved to become the Director of Philosophy at the University of Paris X – Nanterre, and in 1991 also took up the role of professeur invité at the Institut Catholique de Paris. In 1996 he became Director of Philosophy at the University of Paris IV (Sorbonne), where he taught until 2012.

Marion became a visiting professor at the University of Chicago Divinity School in 1994. He was then appointed the John Nuveen Professor of the Philosophy of Religion and Theology there in 2004, a position he held until 2010. That year, he was appointed the Andrew Thomas Greeley and Grace McNichols Greeley Professor of Catholic Studies at the Divinity School, a position that had been vacated by the retirement of theologian David Tracy. He retired from Chicago in 2022.

He continues to serve on the Editorial Advisory Panel of the journal Quaestio. He has also been director of the collection Épiméthée at Presses Universitaires de France (PUF) since 1981.

On 6 November 2008, Marion was elected as an immortel by the Académie Française. Marion now occupies seat 4, an office previously held by Cardinal Lustiger. In 2014, he delivered the Gifford Lectures on Givenness and Revelation at the University of Glasgow.

== Awards ==
- 2020: Premio Joseph Ratzinger of the Fondazione Vaticana Joseph Ratzinger – Benedetto XVI (initially 2020 but received in 2021 due to the COVID-19 pandemic)
- 2018: Prix de la Principauté for his lifetime of achievements & entire body of work - jointly presented by Les Rencontres Philosophiques de Monaco and the Prince Pierre Foundation.
- 2008: Karl Jaspers Prize of the city and University of Heidelberg
- 1992: Grand Prix de philosophie de l'Académie française, for his entire oeuvre
- 1977: Prix Charles Lambert de l'Académie des sciences morales et politiques

== Philosophy ==
Marion's phenomenological work is set out in three volumes which together form a triptych or trilogy. Réduction et donation: Etudes sur Husserl, Heidegger et la phénoménologie (1989) is an historical study of the phenomenological method followed by Husserl and Heidegger, with a view towards suggesting future directions for phenomenological research. The unexpected reaction that Réduction et donation provoked called for clarification and full development. This was addressed in Étant donné: Essai d'une phénoménologie de la donation (1997), a more conceptual work investigating phenomenological givenness, the saturated phenomenon and the gifted—a rethinking of the subject. Du surcroît (2001) provides an in-depth description of saturated phenomena.

=== Givenness ===
Marion claims that he has attempted to "radically reduce the whole phenomenological project beginning with the primacy in it of givenness". What he describes as his one and only theme is the givenness that is required before phenomena can show themselves in consciousness—"what shows itself first gives itself. This is based on the argument that any and all attempts to lead phenomena back to immanence in consciousness, that is, to exercise the phenomenological reduction, necessarily results in showing that givenness is the "sole horizon of phenomena"

Marion radicalizes this argument in the formulation, "As much reduction, as much givenness", and offers this as a new first principle of phenomenology, building on and challenging prior formulae of Husserl and Heidegger. The formulation common to both, Marion argues, "So much appearance, so much Being", adopted from Johann Friedrich Herbart, erroneously elevates appearing to the status of the "sole face of Being". In doing so, it leaves appearing itself undetermined, not subject to the reduction, and thus in a "typically metaphysical situation".

The Husserlian formulation, "To the things themselves!", is criticized on the basis that the things in question would remain what they are even without appearing to a subject—again circumventing the reduction or even without becoming phenomena. Appearing becomes merely a mode of access to objects, rendering the formulation inadequate as a first principle of phenomenology. A third formulation, Husserl's "Principle of all Principles", states "that every primordial dator Intuition is a source of authority (Rechtsquelle) for knowledge, that whatever presents itself in 'intuition'...is simply to be accepted as it gives itself out to be, though only within the limits in which it then presents itself." Marion argues that while the Principle of all Principles places givenness as phenomenality's criterion and achievement, givenness still remains uninterrogated. Whereas it admits limits to intuition ("as it gives itself..., though only within the limits in which it presents itself"), "givenness alone is absolute, free and without condition"

Givenness then is not reducible except to itself, and so is freed from the limits of any other authority, including intuition; a reduced given is either given or not given. "As much reduction, as much givenness" states that givenness is what the reduction accomplishes, and any reduced given is reduced to givenness. The more a phenomenon is reduced, the more it is given. Marion calls the formulation the last principle, equal to the first, that of the appearing itself.

Phenomenological reductions of Husserl, Heidegger and Marion
	To whom are the things in question led back by the reduction?	What is given by the reduction?	How are the things in question given; what is the horizon?	How far does the reduction go, what is excluded?
First reduction – transcendental (Husserl)	The intentional and constituting I	Constituted objects	Through regional ontologies. Through formal ontology, regional ontologies fall within the horizon of objectivity	Excludes everything that does not let itself be led back to objectivity
Second reduction – existential (Heidegger)	Dasein: an intentionality broadened to Being-in-the-world and led back to its transcendence of beings through anxiety	The different ways of Being; the "phenomenon of Being"	According to Being as the original and ultimate phenomenon. According to the horizon of time	Excludes that which does not have to be, especially the preliminary conditions of the phenomenon of Being, e.g. boredom, the claim
Third reduction – to givenness (Marion)	The interloqué: that which is called by the claim of the phenomenon	The gift itself; the gift of rendering oneself to or of eluding the claim of the call	According to the horizon of the absolutely unconditional call and of the absolutely unconstrained response	Absence of conditions and determinations of the claim. Gives all that can call and be called

By describing the structures of phenomena from the basis of givenness, Marion claims to have succeeded in describing certain phenomena that previous metaphysical and phenomenological approaches either ignore or exclude—givens that show themselves but which a thinking that does not go back to the given is powerless to receive. In all, three types of phenomena can be shown, according to the proportionality between what is given in intuition and what is intended:

- Phenomena where little or nothing is given in intuition. Examples include the Nothing and death, mathematics and logic. Marion claims that metaphysics, in particular Kant (but also Husserl), privileges this type of phenomenon.
- Phenomena where there is adequation between what is given in intuition and what is intended. This includes any objective phenomena.
- Phenomena where what is given in intuition fills or surpasses intentionality. These are named saturated phenomena.

=== Saturated phenomena ===
The main concept Marion radically introduces to phenomenology is "saturated phenomenon." Marion defines "saturated phenomena," which contradicts the Kantian claim that phenomena can only occur if they are congruent with the a priori knowledge upon which an observer's cognitive function is founded. For example, Kant would claim that the phenomenon "three years is a longer period of time than four years" cannot occur.

According to Marion, "saturated phenomena" (such as divine revelation) overwhelm the observer with their complete and perfect givenness, such that they are not shaped by the particulars of the observer's cognition at all. These phenomena may be conventionally impossible, and still occur because their givenness saturates the cognitive architecture innate to the observer.

=== "The Intentionality of Love" ===
The fourth section of Marion's work Prolegomena to Charity is entitled "The Intentionality of Love" and primarily concerns intentionality and phenomenology. Influenced by (and dedicated to) the French philosopher Emmanuel Levinas, Marion explores the human idea of love and its lack of definition: "We live with love as if we knew what it was about. But as soon as we try to define it, or at least approach it with concepts, it draws away from us." He begins by explaining the essence of consciousness and its "lived experiences." Paradoxically, the consciousness concerns itself with objects transcendent and exterior to itself, objects irreducible to consciousness, but can only comprehend its 'interpretation' of the object; the reality of the object arises from consciousness alone. Thus the problem with love is that to love another is to love one's own idea of another, or the "lived experiences" that arise in the consciousness from the "chance cause" of another: "I must, then, name this love my love, since it would not fascinate me as my idol if, first, it did not render to me, like an unseen mirror, the image of myself. Love, loved for itself, inevitably ends as self-love, in the phenomenological figure of self-idolatry." Marion believes intentionality is the solution to this problem, and explores the difference between the I who intentionally sees objects and the me who is intentionally seen by a counter-consciousness, another, whether the me likes it or not. Marion defines another by its invisibility; one can see objects through intentionality, but in the invisibility of the other, one is seen. Marion explains this invisibility using the pupil: "Even for a gaze aiming objectively, the pupil remains a living refutation of objectivity, an irremediable denial of the object; here for the first time, in the very midst of the visible, there is nothing to see, except an invisible and untargetable void...my gaze, for the first time, sees an invisible gaze that sees it." Love, then, when freed from intentionality, is the weight of this other's invisible gaze upon one's own, the cross of one's own gaze and the other's and the "unsubstitutability" of the other. Love is to "render oneself there in an unconditional surrender...no other gaze must respond to the ecstasy of this particular other exposed in his gaze." Perhaps in allusion to a theological argument, Marion concludes that this type of surrender "requires faith."

== Publications ==
=== Translations ===
English-language publications
Title	Publisher	ISBN	Year(s)
God Without Being	University of Chicago Press	ISBN 9780226505664	2012
Reduction and Givenness: Investigations of Husserl, Heidegger and Phenomenology	Northwestern University Press	ISBN 9780810112353	1998
Cartesian Questions: Method and Metaphysics	University of Chicago Press	ISBN 9780226505442	1999
On Descartes' Metaphysical Prism: The Constitution and the Limits of Onto-theo-logy in Cartesian Thought	University of Chicago Press	ISBN 9780226505381	1999
"In the Name: How to Avoid Speaking of 'Negative Theology", in JD Caputo and MJ Scanlon, eds, God, the Gift and Postmodernism	Bloomington: Indiana University Press	ISBN 9780253213280	1999
The Idol and Distance: Five Studies	Fordham University Press	ISBN 9780823220786	2001
Being Given: Toward a Phenomenology of Givenness	Stanford University Press	ISBN 9780804734103	2002
In Excess: Studies of Saturated Phenomena	Fordham University Press	ISBN 9780823222162	2002
Prolegomena to Charity	Fordham University Press	ISBN 9780823221714	2002
The Crossing of the Visible	Stanford University Press	ISBN 9780804733922	2004
The Erotic Phenomenon: Six Meditations [trans. Stephen E. Lewis]	University of Chicago Press	ISBN 9780226505374	2008
On the Ego and on God	Fordham University Press	ISBN 9780823227556	2007
The Visible and the Revealed	Fordham University Press	ISBN 9780823228850	2008
The Reason of the Gift (Richard Lectures) [trans. Stephen E. Lewis]	University of Virginia Press	ISBN 9780813931784	2011
In the Self's Place: The Approach of St. Augustine	Stanford University Press	ISBN 9780804785624	2012
Givenness & Hermeneutics (Pere Marquette Lectures in Theology)	Marquette University Press	ISBN 9780874625981	2013
Negative Certainties	University of Chicago Press	ISBN 9780226829487	2015
Givenness and Revelation (Gifford Lectures)	Oxford University Press	ISBN 9780198757733	2016
Believing in Order to See: On the Rationality of Revelation and the Irrationality of Some Believers (trans. Christina M. Gschwandtner)	Fordham University Press	ISBN 9780823275854	2017
A Brief Apology for a Catholic Moment	University of Chicago Press	ISBN 9780226758299	2017
On Descartes' Passive Thought: The Myth of Cartesian Dualism (trans. Christina M. Gschwandtner)	University of Chicago Press	ISBN 9780226192581	2018
Descartes' Grey Ontology: Cartesian Science and Aristotelian Thought in the Regulae	Saint Augustine's Press	ISBN 9781587311765	2022
Revelation Comes from Elsewhere (Cultural Memory in the Present) [trans. Stephen E. Lewis and Stephanie Rumpza]	Stanford University Press	ISBN 9781503639348	2024
Cartesian Questions III: Descartes Beneath the Mask of Cartesianism. [trans. Stephen E. Lewis and Stephanie Rumpza]	Stanford University Press	ISBN 9781503632851	2025

=== Original French ===
French-language publications
Title	Publisher: Collection	ISBN	Year(s)
Le croire pour le voir	Parole et silence: Communio	ISBN 9782845738331	2010
De surcroît: études sur les phénomenes saturés	Presses Universitaires de France: Quadrige	ISBN 9782130584049	2010
Dieu sans l'être; Hors-texte	Librarie Arthème Fayard; PUF: Quadrige	ISBN 9782130608967	2013
Réduction et donation: recherches sue Husserl, Heidegger et la phénoménologie	PUF: Quadrige	ISBN 9782130428664; ISBN 9782130729747	1989; 2015
Étant donné. Essai d'une phénoménologie de la donation	PUF: Quadrige	ISBN 9782130733003	1997
Sur la théologie blanche de Descartes	PUF: Quadrige	ISBN 9782130369387; ISBN 9782130641087	1981; 2015
Dieu sans l’être	PUF: Quadrige	ISBN 9782130608967	2013
La Croisée du visible	PUF: Quadrige	ISBN 9782130621393	1996
Questions cartésiennes I: Méthode et métaphysique	PUF: Épimethée	ISBN 9782130478676; ISBN 9782130830467	1991; 2021
Questions cartésiennes II: Sur l'ego et sur Dieu	PUF: Épimethée	ISBN 9782130478676; ISBN 9782130830481; ISBN 9782130830481	1991; 1996; 2021
Sur le prisme métaphysique de Descartes	PUF: Épimethée	ISBN 9782130545552	1986
Au lieu de soi	PUF: Épimethée	ISBN 9782130544074	2008
Reprise du donné	PUF: Épimethée	ISBN 9782130733003	2016
Sur la pensée de Descartes	PUF: Épimethée	ISBN 9782130585770	2013
Le visible et le révélé	Éditions du Cerf: LeXio	ISBN 9782204113014	2005
Prolégomènes á la charité	Éditions de la Différence; Editions Grasset: Essais & documents	ISBN 9782729106669; ISBN 9782246818649	1991; 2018
L'idole et la distance: cinq études	Bernard Grasset; Éditions Fasquelle; Grasset; Hachette Livre	ISBN 9782246004516; ISBN 9782246045113; ISBN 9782246422723; ISBN 9782253044093; ISBN 9782246045199; ISBN 9782246045199	1977; 1981; 1989; 1991; 2014
Le phénomene érotique: Six méditations	Grasset	ISBN 9782246550914	2003
Certitudes négatives	Grasset	ISBN 9782246669395	2010
Discours de réception à l’Académie française	Grasset	ISBN 9782246778813	2010
Brève apologie pour un moment catholique	Grasset: Essais & documents	ISBN 9782246856801	2017
D'ailleurs, la révélation	Grasset: Essais & documents	ISBN 9782246856832	2020
La métaphysique et après	Grasset: Essais & documents	ISBN 9782246831747	2023
La raison du sport	Grasset: Essais & documents	ISBN 9782246825203	2026
Sur l’ontologie grise de Descartes Science cartésienne et savoir aristotélicien dans les Regulae	Librairie philosophique J. Vrin	ISBN 9782711605491	1993
Figures de phénoménologie	Vrin	ISBN 9782711624225	2012
La Rigueur des choses	Groupe Flammarion	ISBN 2081284758	2012
Courbet ou la peinture à l’œil	Flammarion	ISBN 9782081260986	2014
Cours sur la volonté	Presses universitaires de Louvain: Empreintes philosophiques	ISBN 9782875582744	2014
Ce que nous voyons et ce qui apparaît	Ina Editions: Collège Iconique	ISBN 9782869382343	2015

== See also ==
- Christian existentialism
- Postmodern Christianity
- Rational mysticism
- Walter Schweidler

== Sources ==
- Académie française (2008). "Jean-Luc Marion's profile" (in French). Archived from the original on 2012-02-11.
- "Le philosophe Jean-Luc Marion élu à l'Académie française". L’Agence France-Presse (in French). 2008-11-06. Archived from the original on 2012-09-29.
- Caputo, John D. (2007). "The Erotic Phenomenon by Jean-Luc Marion". Ethics (Book review). 118 (1): 164–168. doi:10.1086/521585. S2CID 171349563.
- Horner, Robyn (2005). Jean-Luc Marion: a Theo-Logical Introduction. Burlington: Ashgate.
- Husserl, Edmund (1969). Ideas: General introduction to pure phenomenology. Translated by W. R. Boyce Gibson (5th ed.). London and New York: George Allen & Unwin and Humanities Press. British SBN: 04 11005 0.
- Marion, Jean-Luc (1998). Reduction and Givenness: Investigations of Husserl, Heidegger, and Phenomenology. Translated by Thomas A. Carlson. Chicago: Northwestern University Press. ISBN 978-0-8101-1235-3.
- Marion, Jean-Luc (2002a). Being Given: Toward a Phenomenology of Givenness. Translated by Jeffrey L. Kosky. Stanford: Stanford University Press. ISBN 978-0-8047-3410-3.
- Marion, Jean-Luc (2002b). In Excess: Studies of Saturated Phenomena. Translated by Robyn Horner and Vincent Berraud. New York: Fordham University Press. ISBN 978-0-8232-2217-9.
- Marion, Jean-Luc (2002c). Prolegomena to Charity. Translated by Stephen E. Lewis. New York: Fordham University Press.
- University of Chicago (2010-02-16). "Nine faculty members receive named chairs, distinguished service appointments". UChicago News.
- University of Chicago Divinity School (2015). "Faculty biography". Archived from the original on 2010-08-11.
