= Ellen Prince =

American linguist

- Born: February 29, 1944; New York City, U.S.
- Died: October 24, 2010 (aged 66); Philadelphia, Pennsylvania, U.S.
- Occupation: Linguist
- Known for: Work in linguistic pragmatics

Academic background
- Education: University of Pennsylvania (PhD)

Ellen F. Prince (February 29, 1944 – October 24, 2010) was an American linguist, known for her work in linguistic pragmatics. She was married to the narratologist Gerald Prince.

== Education and career ==
Prince earned her PhD from the University of Pennsylvania in 1974. She served on the faculty there from 1974 until her retirement in 2005, including serving as chair of the department from 1993 to 1997. During her career, she contributed to more than 60 publications, 150 talks and presentations. She supervised 20 doctoral dissertations and served on dozens of dissertation committees at University of Pennsylvania and other universities around the world.

== Research ==
Prince pioneered in the area of linguistic pragmatics. Her research contributed largely to pragmatic borrowing, syntax and discourse functioning, and centering theory. Research on centering theory was one of her main focuses later in her career, which marries the three areas of information structure, psycholinguistics, and computer science to produce one theory on discourse. She is well known for her typology of information statuses in discourse, basing her conclusions on the study of naturally occurring data. Many of her papers have been – and remain – highly influential in the field of pragmatics. She analyzed the pragmatic functions of syntactic constructions in English and Yiddish, including varieties of cleft and left-periphery constructions, such as topicalization and left-dislocation. Her interest in Yiddish was so strong that between 1985 and 2001 a considerable portion of her academic publications were focused on some aspect of Yiddish linguistics or syntax.

== Honors and distinctions ==
Ellen Prince was a visiting professor at numerous universities, including Columbia University, Tel-Aviv University, Yeshiva University and many more.

Prince served as the President of the Linguistic Society of America in 2008. She was elected as a fellow of the American Association for the Advancement of Science in 2009, and a fellow of the Linguistic Society of America in 2010.

She was born on leap day of the month of February and was therefore able to celebrate only 16 birthdays in the 66 years she lived.

== Selected publications ==
- Prince, Ellen. 1978. A comparison of wh-clefts and it-clefts in discourse. Language 54, 883-906.
- Prince, Ellen. 1981. Toward a taxonomy of given-new information. In Peter Cole (ed.), Radical Pragmatics. New York: Academic Press, 223-254.
- Prince, Ellen. 1992. The ZPG letter: Subjects, definiteness, and information-status. In William C. Mann and Sandra A. Thompson (Eds.), Discourse Description: Diverse linguistic analyses of a fund-raising text. John Benjamins, Philadelphia, pp. 295–326.
- Prince, Ellen, 1997. On the functions of left-dislocation in English discourse. In: Kamio, A. (Ed.), Directions in Functional Linguistics. John Benjamins, Philadelphia, pp. 117–144.
- Prince, Ellen, 1998. On the limits of syntax, with reference to topicalization and left-dislocation. In: Cullicover, P., McNally, L. (Eds.), Syntax and Semantics, vol. 29. Academic Press, New York, pp. 281–302
