= Information structure =

Way in which information is formally packaged within a sentence

In linguistics, information structure, also called information packaging, describes the way in which information is formally packaged within a sentence. This generally includes only those aspects of information that "respond to the temporary state of the addressee's mind", and excludes other aspects of linguistic information such as references to background (encyclopedic/common) knowledge, choice of style, politeness, and so forth. For example, the difference between an active clause (e.g., the police want him) and a corresponding passive (e.g., he is wanted by police) is a syntactic difference, but one motivated by information structuring considerations. Other choices motivated by information structure include preposing (e.g., that one I don't like) and inversion (e.g., "the end", said the man).

The basic notions of information structure are focus, givenness, and topic, as well as their complementary notions of background, newness, and comment respectively. Focus "indicates the presence of alternatives that are relevant for the interpretation of linguistic expressions", givenness indicates that "the denotation of an expression is present" in the immediate context of the utterance, and topic is "the entity that a speaker identifies, about which then information, the comment, is given". Additional notions in information structure may include contrast and exhaustivity, but there is no general agreement in the linguistic literature about extensions of the basic three notions. There are many different approaches, such as cognitive, generative or functional architectures, to information structure. The concept has also been used in studies measuring information density in cognitive linguistics.

== Terminology ==
The term information structure is due to Halliday (1967). In 1976, Chafe introduced the term information packaging.

== Mechanisms in various languages ==
Information structure can be realized through a wide variety of linguistic mechanisms. In the spoken form of English, one of the primary methods of indicating information structure is through intonation, whereby pitch is modified from some default pattern. Other languages use syntactic mechanisms like dislocation, anaphora, and gapping; morphological mechanisms like specialized focus or topic-marking affixes; and specialized discourse particles. Cross-linguistically, word order variation (the so-called "inverted sentences") is one of the main syntactic devices used to convey specific information structure configurations, namely the presentational focus. English in fact uses more than intonation for expressing information structure, so that clefts are used for exhaustive focus, and grammatical particles like only also induce contrastive focus readings.

Cross-linguistically, there are clear tendencies that relate notions of information structure to particular linguistic phenomena. For instance, focus tends to be prosodically prominent, and there do not seem to be any languages that express focus by deaccenting destressing.

The following German sentences exhibit three different kinds of syntactic 'fronting' that correlate with topic.

a. _Diesen Mann_ habe ich noch nie gesehen.
'This man have I yet not seen.' (movement)
b. _Diesen Mann_, den habe ich noch nie gesehen.
'This man, that I have yet not seen.' (left dislocation)
c. _Diesen Mann_, ich habe ihn noch nie gesehen.
'This man, I have him yet not seen.' (hanging topic)

It is often assumed that answers to questions are focused elements. Question and answer pairs are often used as diagnostics for focus, as in the following English examples.

Q: What did John do with the book yesterday?
A: He SOLD the book yesterday.
A: *He sold the book YESTERDAY.

Q: When did Jane sell the book?
A: She sold the book YESTERDAY.
A: *She SOLD the book yesterday.

== Concepts ==
=== Focus and background ===
Focus is a grammatical category or attribute that determines indicating that part of an utterance contributes new, non-derivable, or contrastive information. Some theories (in line with work by Mats Rooth) link focus to the presence of alternatives (see Focus (linguistics) § Alternative semantics). An alternative theory of focus would account for the stress pattern in the example from the previous section (When did Jane sell the book? She sold the book YESTERDAY), saying that YESTERDAY receives focus because it could be substituted with alternative time periods (TODAY or LAST WEEK) and still serve to answer the question the first speaker asked.

Background is a more difficult concept to define; it's not simply the complement of focus. Daniel P. Hole gives the following framework: "'Focus' is a relational notion, and the entity a focus relates to is called its background, or presupposition."

=== Topic and comment ===
The topic (or theme) of a sentence is what is being talked about, and the comment (or rheme, or sometimes focus) is what is being said about the topic. That the information structure of a clause is divided in this way is generally agreed on, but the boundary between topic/theme depends on the grammatical theory. Topic is grammaticalized in languages like Japanese and Korean, which have a designated topic-marker morpheme affixed to the topic.

Some diagnostics have been proposed for languages that lack grammatical topic-markers, like English; they attempt to distinguish between different kinds of topics (such as "aboutness" topics and "contrastive" topics). The diagnostics consist of judging how felicitous it is to follow a discourse with either questions (What about x?) or sentences beginning with certain phrases (About x, ... Speaking of x, ... As for x, ...) to determine how "topical" x is in that context.

=== Given and new ===
Intuitively, givenness classifies words and information in a discourse that are already known (or given) by virtue of being common knowledge, or by having been discussed previously in the same discourse ("anaphorically recoverable"). Certain theories (such as Roger Schwarzschild's GIVENness Constraint) require all non-focus-marked constituents to be given.

Words/information that are not given, or are "textually and situationally non-derivable" are by definition new.

== See also ==
- Succinctness
