= Right node raising =

Linguistic phenomenon

Right node raising (RNR) is a linguistics term that denotes a sharing mechanism, that sees the material to the immediate right of parallel structures being in some sense "shared" by those parallel structures, e.g. [Sam likes] but [Fred dislikes] the debates. The parallel structures of RNR are typically the conjuncts of a coordinate structure, although the phenomenon is not limited to coordination, since it can also appear with parallel structures that do not involve coordination. The term right node raising itself is due to Postal (1974). Postal assumed that the parallel structures are complete clauses below the surface. The shared constituent was then raised rightward out of each conjunct of the coordinate structure and attached as a single constituent to the structure above the level of the conjuncts, hence "right node raising" was occurring in a literal sense. While the term right node raising survives, the actual analysis that Postal proposed is not (or no longer) widely accepted. RNR occurs in many languages, including English and related languages.

RNR is a phenomenon that challenges theories of syntax in significant ways. The difficulties are due to the status of the parallel structures as well as to the status of the shared material. The parallel structures typically do not qualify as constituents, and the shared material can also fail to qualify as a single constituent.

== Typical examples ==
The following examples are typical instances of RNR in English. The square brackets mark the conjuncts of the coordinate structures involved and the material shared by the conjuncts is bolded:

a. [Fred prepares] and [Susan eats] the food.

b. [Larry has promised] but [Jim refuses] to support reform.

c. [Jim can] but [Jerry cannot] make the meeting.

d. [When did he] and [why did he] suffer a setback?

e. [Sometimes she carefully reads] and [at other times she merely skims] the report.

One easily observable fact about these examples is that they prefer a unique intonation pattern. There tends to be emphasis on the contrasting words within the conjuncts, and pauses immediately after the left-most conjunct and immediately before the shared material. This special intonation contour is sometimes indicated using commas, e.g. Fred prepares, and Susan eats, the food. A key observation about the conjuncts is that they are not constituents. Word combinations such as Fred prepares and Susan eats do not qualify as constituents in most theories of syntax. This fact casts doubt on the usefulness of coordination as a test for identifying the constituent structure of sentences.

== Some noteworthy traits ==
The following subsections enumerate some noteworthy traits of RNR: 1) RNR is independent of coordination; 2) it occurs at various levels of structure (not just at the clausal level); 3) it is unlike instances of forward sharing in crucial respects; 4) the shared material can fail to qualify as a constituent; and 5) it at times requires the conjunct-final elements to stand in contrast to each other.

=== RNR without coordination ===
Perhaps the most important trait of RNR is that it can occur in the absence of coordination, e.g.

a. [The man who supports] would never get along with [the woman who rejects] Romney's proposed tax cut. - RNR without coordination
b. [Those who admire] are outnumbered by [those who despise], books about grammatical theory. - RNR without coordination
c. I [talked to] without [actually meeting] everyone in the committee. - RNR without coordination

Since the parallel structures in these cases (marked by brackets) are not adjacent to each other, one really cannot view them as involving coordination. What this means is that the RNR mechanism is independent of coordination. In this regard, exactly what renders two or more structures parallel enough so that RNR can occur is not clear. What is clear, however, is that while coordination does commonly produce the parallel structures that allow RNR to occur, the RNR mechanism is independent of coordination.

=== At various levels of structure ===
Most discussions of RNR produce examples where the RNR mechanism is occurring at the sentence or clause level, meaning the conjuncts contain finite verbs. One should note in this respect, however, that RNR is not limited to occurring within clauses; it can also occur at the level of phrases. The following examples illustrate the backward sharing of RNR at the VP level, the NP level, and the PP level:

[Having to read] and [being forced to summarize] that theory is horrible. - RNR within VPs
She is [trying to examine] and [wanting to explain] the problem. - RNR within VPs

[The old] and [the new] submarines submerged side by side. - RNR within NPs
[My presentation] and [your explanation] of the new theory could not be understood. - RNR within NPs

[Right before his] and [right after her] presentation, we drank coffee. - RNR within PPs
[Before a meager] and [after a meager] meal, I am always dissatisfied. - RNR within PPs

Whatever the analysis of RNR, one has to acknowledge that the mechanism is flexible insofar it is not reliant on the presence of one specific type of syntactic category (e.g. finite verb), but rather it can occur at various levels of the syntactic structure.

=== Unlike forward sharing ===
An examination of coordination quickly reveals that the shared material often precedes the coordinate structures. The shared material preceding the conjuncts is now in bold:

Larry [cooks a lot] and [eats everything he cooks].

Sam gave [his girlfriend flowers] and [his mother chocolates].

The shared material in these sentences precedes the coordinate structures. There is a limitation on this sort of forward sharing, however. Certain material preceding the conjuncts of coordinate structures cannot be shared, e.g.

*Too [many boys came] and [few girls wanted to dance]. - Forward sharing fails.

*The university's [students are intelligent] and [faculty is committed to freedom]. - Forward sharing fails.

*Three [blue cars arrived] and [red cars departed]. - Forward sharing fails.

While explanations for the block on forward sharing have been provided in the literature on coordination, the importance of these data for RNR is that there is no such similar block on RNR. The backward sharing of RNR is not limited in this way. What this means is that backward sharing cannot be construed as the mirror image of forward sharing. The acknowledgment of RNR as a separate sharing mechanism is therefore warranted.

=== Non-constituents ===
The conjuncts of standard cases of RNR do not qualify as constituents on the surface. This fact is evident in the examples throughout this article, where the bracketed strings are shown as what most theories of syntax take to be non-constituents. In contrast, the shared material of most examples of RNR in English does qualify as a constituent. There are exceptions to this observation, however. The shared material of certain instances of RNR does not qualify as a constituent, e.g.

a. [Smith loaned] and [his widow later donated] a valuable collection of manuscripts to the library. - Shared material is a non-constituent string.

b. [Leslie played] and [Mary sang] some C&W songs at George's party. - Shared material is a non-constituent string.

c. [I borrowed] and [my sisters stole] large sums of money from the Chase Manhattan bank. - Shared material is a non-constituent string.

Given a traditional left-branching analysis of the VPs in these examples, the shared material (in bold) fails to qualify as a constituent. That the shared material need not qualify as a constituent is perhaps more visible in other languages, for instance in German:

d.	dass	[mich	heute]	und	[dich	gestern]	**jemand**	**gesehen**	**hat**
	that	me	today	and	you	yesterday	someone	seen	has
	'that someone saw me today and you yesterday'

The shared material in this example, which consists of the subject and the verb chain, can in no way be construed as a constituent. The fact that both the parallel structures and the shared material can qualify as non-constituent strings challenges a constituent-based theory of RNR in significant ways (see below), since it is not evident how one should characterize these strings.

=== Contrast requirement ===
At times there appears to be a contrast requirement on the conjunct-final elements of RNR, e.g.

a. *[He must] and [she must] stop.
b. [He must] and [she should] stop.

a. *[He sits on] and [she lies on] the bed.
b. [He sits] and [she lies] on the bed.

a. *[Sam supports] and [Susan supports] Romney.
b. [Sam supports] but [Susan rejects] Romney.

The a-sentences appear to be bad because the conjunct-final elements are identical, e.g. must and must. The b-sentence, in contrast, are much better because the conjunct-final elements there are NOT identical, e.g. must and should. These data suggest that there is a contrast constraint on the conjunct-final elements of RNR. However, the matter is not as straightforward as the three examples suggest, since other cases allow the conjunct-final elements to be identical, e.g.

a. [When does he] and [why does he] do that?

b. [Can I] and [should I] try it?

Despite the fact that the conjunct-final elements in these examples do not contrast, the sentences can be acceptable given an appropriate intonation contour. Some similar data from German reinforce the point:

a.	dass	[sie	zu lange	geschlafen]	und	[er	zu lange	geschlafen]	**hat**
	that	she	too long	slept	and	he	too long	slept	has
	'that she slept too long and he slept too long'

b.	dass	[er	helfen]	und	[sie	helfen]	**will**
	that	he	help	and	she	help	wants
	'that he wants to help and she wants to help'

This aspect of RNR is mysterious. It remains unclear exactly when the conjunct-final elements of RNR can and cannot be identical.

== Theoretical accounts ==
One can discern between three basic theoretic approaches to RNR: 1) the large conjunct approach in terms of movement, 2) the large conjunct approach in terms of ellipsis, and 3) the small conjunct approach.

=== Large conjuncts in terms of movement ===
The large conjunct approach in terms of movement assumes that the parallel structures of RNR are full clauses or phrases below the surface. A movement mechanism is responsible for raising the shared material out of both conjuncts to a position in the hierarchy that is above the level of the parallel structures. Given this movement, the parallel structures actually qualify as constituents before movement. The movement analysis is illustrated here using t (trace) and indices to mark the positions of the shared material before movement occurs.

a. [Fred prepares t_{1}] and [Susan eats t_{1}] the food_{1}. - Movement analysis

b. [Larry has promised t_{1}] but [Jim refuses t_{1}] to support reform_{1}. - Movement analysis

Below the surface before movement occurs, the conjuncts in these cases are in fact constituents. Thus by assuming movement, the account of RNR can maintain a theory of syntax that is constituent-based, i.e. the constituent is the fundamental unit of syntactic analysis. The main problem with the movement analysis, however, is that the movements of RNR would have to be able to ignore the islands and barriers that are otherwise established as limitations on movement. The movement approach is the account originally pursued by Postal (1974).

=== Large conjuncts in terms of ellipsis ===
The large conjunct approach in terms of ellipsis also assumes that the parallel structures of RNR are full clauses or phrases below the surface. But in contrast to the movement approach, the ellipsis approach assumes that ellipsis alone occurs, without movement. An ellipsis mechanism elides the redundant material from all the conjuncts except the right-most one. A smaller font and subscripts are now used to indicate ellipsis:

a. [Fred prepares _{the food}] and [Susan eats the food]. - Ellipsis analysis

b. [Larry has promised _{to support reform}] but [Jim refuses to support reform]. - Ellipsis analysis

By assuming large conjuncts and ellipsis in this manner, this account also succeeds at maintaining a constituent-based theory of syntactic analysis. The parallel structures of RNR are constituents before ellipsis occurs. Like the movement account, the ellipsis account has a significant shortcoming. At times the pre-ellipsis structure would be nonsensical and/or simply ungrammatical, e.g.

a. [Sam hummed _{the same tune}] and [Susan sang the same tune].
b. [Fred already has _{pictures of each other}] and [Larry just found pictures of each other].
c. [I met a man _{who know each other}] and [you met a woman who know each other].

If the indicated ellipses were not to occur in these cases, the sentences would be bad. These sentences only make sense on the collective readings, where, for instance, only one tune was hummed and only one tune, the same tune, was sung. Thus there is a semantic and syntactic mismatch across the pre- and post-ellipsis sentences.

=== Small conjuncts ===
The small conjunct approach dispenses with the desire to see the parallel structures as complete constituents at some level of structure below the surface. Instead, it assumes that what you see is what you get; the parallel structures are non-constituent strings that share the material to the immediate right of the final bracket. Neither movement nor ellipsis occurs. This approach has tacitly been taken for granted in this article. It avoids all the problems facing the previous two approaches. However, this success comes at a cost, since the small conjuncts do not qualify as constituents. The challenge facing the small conjunct approach is therefore to provide a principled account of how the RNR mechanism allows the parallel structures to be non-constituents.

== See also ==
- Clause
- Constituent
- Coordination
- Ellipsis
- Finite verb
- Phrase
- Zeugma and syllepsis
- Raising (syntax)

== Literature ==
- Abbot, B. 1976. Right node raising as a test for constituenthood. Linguistic Inquiry 7, 639–642.
- Erteschik-Shir, N. 1987. Right node raising. MIT Working Papers in Linguistics 9, 105–117.
- Gazdar, G, E. Klein, G. Pullum, and I. Sag. 1985. Generalized Phrase Structure Grammar. Oxford: Blackwell.
- Hartmann, K. 2000. Right node raising and gapping: Interface conditions on prosodic deletion. Philadelphia: Benjamins.
- Hudson, R. 1976. Conjunction reduction, gapping, and right-node raising. Language 52, 535–562.
- Hudson, R. 1988. Coordination and grammatical relations. Journal of Linguistics 24, 303–342.
- Hudson, R. 1989. Gapping and grammatical relations. Journal of Linguistics 25, 57–94.
- Jackendoff, R. 1977. X-bar syntax. Cambridge: MIT Press.
- Johannessen, J. 1998. Coordination. New York: Oxford University Press.
- Klein, W. Some rules of regular ellipsis in German. 1981. In: Crossing the boundaries in linguistics: Studies presented to Manfred Bierwisch. ed. by W. Klein and W. Levelt, 51–78. Dordrecht: Springer Netherlands.
- Neijt, A. 1989. Review of the "They syntax of coordination". Lingua, 343–357.
- Osborne, T. 2006. Shared material and grammar: A dependency grammar theory of non-gapping coordination. Zeitschrift für Sprachwissenschaft 25, 39–93.
- Phillips, C. 2003. Linear order and constituency. Linguistic Inquiry 34, 37–90.
- Postal, P. 1974. On raising. Cambridge: MIT Press.
- Ross, J. 1967. Constraints on variables in syntax. Doctoral dissertation, MIT.
- Wesche, B. 1995. Symmetric coordination: An alternative theory of phrase structure. Tübingen: Niemeyer.
- Wilder, C. 1994. Coordination, ATB and ellipsis. In: Minimalism and Kayne's asymmetry hypothesis, 291–329.
- Wilder, C. 1997. Some properties of ellipsis in coordination. In: Studies on universal grammar and typological variation, ed. by A. Alexiadou and T. Hall, 59–106. Amsterdam: John Benjamins.
