= Gerald Prince =

American academic and literary theoretician

Gerald J. Prince (born November 7, 1942, in Alexandria, Egypt; died November 3, 2026, in Philadelphia, Pennsylvania) was an American academic and literary theoretician. He was Professor of French and Francophone Studies at the University of Pennsylvania, where he was also affiliated with the Department of Linguistics, the Program in Comparative Literature, and the Annenberg School for Communication.

Prince received his Ph.D. from Brown University in 1968. He was a leading scholar of narrative poetics, and he helped to shape the discipline of narratology, developing key concepts such as the narratee, narrativity, the disnarrated, and narrative grammar. In addition to his theoretical work, he was a distinguished critic of contemporary French literature and was regarded as an authority on the French novel of the twentieth century.

Prince's writings in French and English have been translated into many other languages, and he was a visiting professor at universities in France, Belgium, Italy, Australia, and Canada, as well as the United States. He was the General Editor of the "Stages" series at the University of Nebraska Press and served on more than a dozen other editorial and advisory boards. In 2013 he received the Wayne C. Booth Lifetime Achievement Award from the International Society for the Study of Narrative, an organization that he presided over in 2007.

He was married (until her death in 2010) to the linguist Ellen Prince.

== Bibliography ==
- Métaphysique et technique dans l'oeuvre romanesque de Sartre. Geneva: Droz, 1968.
- A Grammar of Stories. Berlin: Mouton, 1973.
- Narratology: The Form and Functioning of Narrative. Berlin: Mouton, 1982.
- A Dictionary of Narratology. Lincoln: University of Nebraska Press, 1987.
- Narrative as Theme: Studies in French Fiction. Lincoln: University of Nebraska Press, 1992.
- Alteratives. Co-edited with Warren Motte. Lexington: French Forum, 1993.
- Autobiography, Historiography, and Rhetoric. Co-edited with Mary Donaldson-Evans and Lucienne Frappier-Mazur. Amsterdam: Rodopi, 1994.
- Corps/Décors: Femmes, Orgies, Parodies. Co-edited with Catherine Nesci and Gretchen Van Slyke. Amsterdam: Rodopi, 1999.
- Eroticisms/Érotismes. Co-edited with Roger Célestin and Éliane DalMolin. Special issue of Sites, vol. 6, no. 1, 2002.
- Guide du roman de langue française (1901-1950). Lanham: University Press of America, 2002.
- Résurgence/Oubli. Co-edited with Sabrinelle Bedrane and Bruno Blanckeman. Special issue of French Forum, vol. 41. no. 1–2, 2016.
- Geographical Narratology (special issue of Frontiers of Narrative Studies, vol. 4, no. 2, 2018.
- Guide du roman de langue française (1951-2000). Paris: Vérone, 2019.
