= Counter-experience =

Counter-experience describes a perception of a non-objective (typically spiritual) phenomenon. First coined by the French phenomenologist Jean-Luc Marion, it has been elevated to book title status by the Marion scholar Kevin Hart.

== Contrast with experience ==
One may experience physical objects using the five senses. In contrast, one may counter-experience revelation, a spiritual presence, or an awareness. Feelings of sublimity or awe are often indicators of counter-experience.
