= Dislocation (syntax) =

Type of sentence structure

In syntax, dislocation is a sentence structure in which a constituent, which could otherwise be either an argument or an adjunct of the clause, occurs outside the clause boundaries either to its left or to its right. In this English example They went to the store, Mary and Peter the dislocation occurs to the right.

The dislocated element is often separated by a pause (comma in writing) from the rest of the sentence. Its place within the clause is often occupied by a pronoun (e.g. they).

There are two types of dislocation: right dislocation, in which the constituent is postponed (as in the above example), or a left dislocation, in which it is advanced. Right dislocation often occurs with a clarifying afterthought: They went to the store is a coherent sentence, but Mary and Peter is added afterward to clarify exactly who they are. By contrast, left dislocation is like clefting: it can be used to emphasize or define a topic. For example, the sentence This little girl, the dog bit her has the same meaning as The dog bit this little girl but it emphasizes that the little girl (and not the dog) is the topic of interest. One might expect the next sentence to be The little girl needs to see a doctor, rather than The dog needs to be leashed. This type of dislocation is a feature of topic-prominent languages.

== In French ==
Informal spoken French uses right dislocation very naturally and extensively, to detach semantic information from the grammatical information. Whereas a French news article would likely translate The dog bit the little girl as Le chien a mordu la petite fille (lit. "The dog has bitten the little girl"), in everyday speech one might hear Il l'a mordue, le chien, la petite fille (lit. "It has bitten her, the dog, the little girl"), in which both le chien ("the dog") and la petite fille ("the little girl") have been dislocated to the right and replaced by pronouns within the clause. This phenomenon was first studied in French by linguist Joseph Vendryes.

It has been proposed that informal spoken French can be analyzed as having polypersonal agreement; that is, the various (mostly clitic) pronouns surrounding the verb can be viewed as inflections on the verb that agree in person, number, and sometimes gender with its various arguments.

Author Raymond Queneau, whose favourite example of dislocation in French was L'a-t-il jamais attrapé, le gendarme, son voleur ? ("Has he ever caught him, the policeman, his thief?"), has been inspired to write many articles such as Connaissez-vous le Chinook ? ("Do you know Chinookan?"). According to Queneau, right dislocation in Chinookan is commonplace.

== In Cantonese ==
Colloquial Cantonese often uses right dislocation when afterthoughts occur after completing a sentence. Because it is a pro-drop language, no pronoun is used when a subject is dislocated, leading to an appearance of changed word order. For instance, the normal word order is subject–verb–object (SVO):

王生 返 咗 屋企。
{wong4 saang1} faan1 zo2 {uk1 kei2}
{Mr. Wong} return PFV home
Mr. Wong returned home.

Dislocation can result in the appearance of verb–object–subject (VOS) word order because no pronoun is used:

返 咗 屋企 喇, 王生。
faan1 zo2 {uk1 kei2} laa3, {wong4 saang1}
return PFV home SFP, {Mr. Wong}
[He] returned home, Mr. Wong.

At a deep level though, the sentence is still SVO but only appears to be VOS due to dislocation and pronoun dropping. Often a sentence-final particle (SFP) is required after the main clause, otherwise the sentence would sound strange or unacceptable. Right dislocation in Cantonese can occur with auxiliary verbs, adverbs, and sometimes subordinate clauses in addition to subjects.

Being a Chinese language, Cantonese is also a topic-prominent language and thus features left dislocation. For instance:

王生 已經 買 咗 奶。
{wong4 saang1} {ji5 ging1} maai5 zo2 naai5
{Mr. Wong} already buy PFV milk
Mr. Wong already bought the milk.

Topicalization can make this sentence appear to be object–subject–verb (OSV):

奶 王生 已經 買 咗。
naai5 {wong4 saang1} {ji5 ging1} maai5 zo2
milk {Mr. Wong} already buy PFV
[As for] the milk, Mr. Wong already bought [it].

Both left and right dislocation can even be featured in the same sentence:

奶 已經 買 咗 喇, 王生。
naai5 {ji5 ging1} maai5 zo2 laa3, {wong4 saang1}
milk already buy PFV SFP, {Mr. Wong}
[As for] the milk, [he] already bought [it], Mr. Wong

== Sources ==
- Lambrecht, Knud. 2001. "Dislocation". In Martin Haspelmath, Ekkehard König, Wulf Oesterreicher & Wolfgang Raible, eds., Language Typology and Language Universals: An International Handbook. (Handbücher zur Sprach- und Kommunikationswissenschaft, 20). Vol. 2, 1050–1078. Berlin, New York: Walter de Gruyter.
- Prince, Ellen, 1997. On the functions of left-dislocation in English discourse. In: Kamio, A. (Ed.), Directions in Functional Linguistics. John Benjamins, Philadelphia, pp. 117–144.
- Prince, Ellen, 1998. On the limits of syntax, with reference to topicalization and left-dislocation. In: Cullicover, P., McNally, L. (Eds.), Syntax and Semantics, vol. 29. Academic Press, New York, pp. 281–302
