= Heroic Act of Charity =

Catholic devotional practice

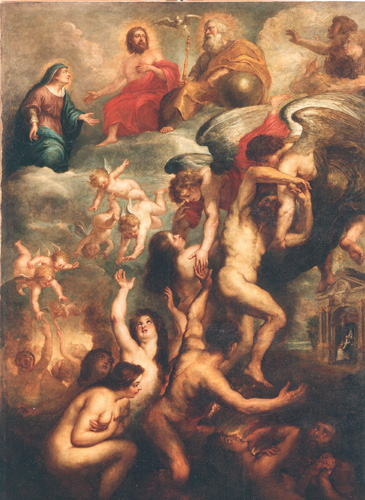
Purgatory, Peter Paul Rubens

The Heroic Act of Charity is a Catholic devotional practice. A Catholic who makes a Heroic Act of Charity offers the value of all prayers and good works they perform in their life, as well as any benefits they may receive after their death, for the benefit of the souls in purgatory.

== Prayer for the dead ==
Catholics include prayer for the dead among the spiritual works of mercy, considering it part of the communion of saints.

A verse often cited in support of this practice is 2 Maccabees 12:43-46:

He then took up a collection among all his soldiers, amounting to two thousand silver drachmas, which he sent to Jerusalem to provide for an expiatory sacrifice. In doing this he acted in a very excellent and noble way, inasmuch as he had the resurrection of the dead in view; for if he were not expecting the fallen to rise again, it would have been useless and foolish to pray for them in death. But if he did this with a view to the splendid reward that awaits those who had gone to rest in godliness, it was a holy and pious thought. Thus he made atonement for the dead that they might be freed from this sin.

== Heroic Act of Charity ==
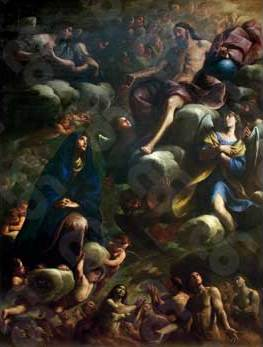
Andrea Vaccaro - The Virgin intercedes for the Souls in Purgatory

A decree of the Sacred Congregation of Indulgences dated 18 December 1885, and confirmed by Leo XIII, establishes the Heroic Act of Charity:

The Heroic Act of Charity in favour of the souls detained in purgatory consists in this, that a member of the Church militant (Christifidelis), either using a set formula or simply by an act of his will, offers to God for the souls in purgatory all the satisfactory works which he will perform during his lifetime, and also all the suffrages which may accrue to him after his death.

Catholic custom suggests that this Act allows the Virgin Mary to distribute the benefits to the souls in purgatory as she chooses. It is intended to be made only after serious reflection, may be performed either as a set formula or by a simple act of will, and can be revoked.

When making the Heroic Act, a Catholic intends to give up anything that might be acceptable to God as atonement for their own sins or to reduce their own time in Purgatory. It is effectively an offer to spend time in Purgatory on behalf of others, although with the hope that God will not choose to inflict the full punishment.

Catholics believe that the effect of the Heroic Act depends on the will and mercy of God. A person who has made the Heroic Act may still pray both for their own intentions and for friends.

This practice was encouraged by a number of Popes including Benedict XIII (1728), Pius VI (1788) and Pius IX (1852).
