= Givenness =

Quality of information that is assumed to be known to the listener

In linguistics, givenness is the degree to which a speaker assumes certain contextual information of a topic of discourse is already known to the listener. The speaker thus considers it unnecessary to provide further contextual information through an expression's linguistic properties (e.g. its syntactic form or position, or its patterns of stress and intonation). A given contextual information in a discourse is assumed to be known by the addressee in the moment of utterance, therefore a given expression must be known from prior discourse.

Givenness is marked by the absence of emphasis or detailed explanations. For example, when informing a close friend of having taken a long-considered action, one might simply say "I did it!" The givenness of the action which "it" refers to results from previously discussing the action. In that utterance, the stress would not fall on "it," but on "did." This example may be contrasted when the nature of the action is new information, such as "I did a cartwheel!" In this case, the object of did— the noun cartwheel— will receive the emphasis.

== Definitions ==
In literature, Prince (1981) distinguishes between three different kinds of Givenness:

1. "The speaker assumes the hearer can predict or could have predicted a particular linguistic item will or would occur in a particular position within a sentence.
2. "The speaker assumes the hearer has or could appropriately have some particular thing/entity/... in his/her CONSCIOUSNESS at the time of hearing the utterance.
3. "The speaker assumes the hearer "knows," assumes, or can infer in a particular thing (but is not necessarily thinking about it)."

Definition by Krifka (2008):

A feature X of an expression α is a Givenness feature if X indicates whether the denotation of α is present in the CG [(Common Ground)] (see below) or not, and/or indicates the degree to which it is present in the immediate CG.

This definition allows two different interpretations of givenness: givenness may be either a categorical feature (given vs. not given), or a scale that expresses the degree of discourse salience.

Definition by Kratzer and Selkirk (2018):

An expression α is Given in a context C if there is a discourse referent (individual, property, proposition) in C that entails [[α]] O, C.

== Entailment ==
Entailment describes the relation between expression α and expression β when one of the following conditions applies:

Co-reference is one of the two semantic relations that express Givenness. Formally, references α and β both refer to the same entity (the referent): α,β ∈ D_{e}, α = β. A pronoun (α) usually identifies a noun phrase that has been mentioned (β) in a prior context and (α). Examples of:

1. On my way home, a dog barked at me. I was really frightened by [the fierce German shepherd]_{Given}.
2. Did you see Dr. Cramer to get your root canal? - Don't remind me. I'd like to strangle [the butcher]_{Given}.
3. My neighbor is a funny character. Still, I really like [John]_{Given}.

Alternatively, for non-referential α and β (e.g. predicates, quantifiers), α is given if the meaning of α and β are extensionally identical or α is a hypernym of β. Formally, α,β ∈ D_{t}, and α=0 or β=1.

Extensional Identity occurs when an expression α is identical with a prior mentioned expression β, which makes α given.

1. They brought some beer (β), but they didn't drink [the beer]_{Given} (α) because it was warm.

A hypernym α of another item β is when the meaning of α includes β as a subcategory, making item α given:

X: I brought carrots (β) to the picnic.

Y: But I don't like [vegetables]_{Given} (α).

However, if instead β includes α, there is hyponymy, and the hyponym (α) is considered to be not given:

X: I put some vegetables (β) in the soup.

Y: Oh I hate carrots (α). I hope you didn't put any inside.

Propositional Identity occurs when the proposition (α) is given because it is identical with the proposition (β) and proposition (β) is true.

a. Did you hear that Otto went to Russia (β)?

b. I can't believe that [he went to Russia]_{Given} (α).

Asymmetric Entailment occurs when the proposition (α) is given because the proposition (α) is always true when the proposition (β) is true.

a. Did you hear that Otto went to Russia?

b. I can't believe [that he left]_{Given}(α).

== Expressing givenness ==
Givenness can be expressed by anaphoric expressions, deletion, or word order.

=== Anaphoric expressions ===
Anaphoric expressions indicate the status of their denotations. Anaphoric expressions include personal pronouns, clitics and person inflections, demonstratives, and definite articles as well as indefinite articles that indicate a non-given referent.

a. The crowd approached the gate. The guards were AFRAID of [the women]_{Given}.

b. The children were up late. I'm reluctant to WAKE [the boys]_{Given}.

c. John ate garlic bread. Then [he]_{Given} kissed Mary.

=== Decantation ===
Decantation is a form of prosodic reduction.

a. Ten years after John inherited an old farm, he SOLD [the shed]Given

Here the shed is decanted because it is referring to the prior mentioned farm. Decantation is conditioned by Common Ground Management and can be seen as presuppositional because it expresses a presupposition of a situationally salient antecedent of a particular sort.

Decantation can also occur in indefinite noun phrases:

a. If John paints a hot dog, Sam will eat [a hot dog]_{Given}.

Decantation can occur on a focused constituent that is given at the same time, where it does not bear the pitch accent but functions as a focus with only :

a. X: Everyone already knew that Mary only eats VEGETABLES.

Y: If even PAUL knew that Mary only eats [vegetables]_{Given}, then he should have suggested a different RESTAURANT.

=== Deletion ===
Deletion is an extreme form of reduction.

a. Bill went to Greenland, and Mary did _ too.

In this example, one can find the deletion of the VP went to Greenland.

=== Word Order ===
In the double object construction, given constituents precede new constituents:

a. Bill showed the boy a girl.

*Bill showed a boy the girl.

*Bill showed the girl a boy.

== Common Ground ==
Common Ground (CG) in linguistics is the shared knowledge between participants in discourse. It is a set of propositions and entities that are known to both speakers, and is updated during the discourse. Common Ground can further be divided into

- Common Ground Management (CG Management) that is concerned with the immediate and temporary needs and communicative goals of discourse partners.
- Common Ground Content (CG Content) that records and updates the shared knowledge and belief of discourse partners.

== Exceptions ==
Two individuals who spend a lot of time together or have many shared experiences can more easily latch onto each other's givenness in their discourse. However, when that phenomenon is relied upon in future or ongoing conversations, deficits in information can begin to develop, and as a result, it becomes difficult to assess givenness in the context of new conversations.

== See also ==
- Presupposition
- Topic and comment
- Focus (linguistics)
