= Quaestio =

Academic journal of philosophy

- Discipline: Philosophy
- Language: English
- Edited by: Pasquale Porro and Constantino Esposito

Publication details
- History: 2002–present
- Publisher: Brepols (Belgium)
- Frequency: Annually
- Open access: Yes

Standard abbreviations
- ISO 4: Quaestio

Indexing
- ISSN: 1379-2547 (print); 2295-9033 (web)

Links
- Journal homepage; Online access

Quaestio is an annual peer-reviewed open access academic journal of philosophy with a particular emphasis on the history of metaphysics. it was established in 2002 and is published by Brepols. Its editors are Pasquale Porro and Constantino Esposito. Among its Editorial Advisors are Olivier Boulnois, Alain de Libera, and Jean-Luc Marion. The journal is abstracted and indexed in ERIH PLUS, International Medieval Bibliography, Bibliography of British and Irish History, Dialnet, Index Islamicus, International Bibliography of Humanism and the Renaissance, Répertoire Bibliographique de la Philosophie, Scopus, and elsewhere. It publishes articles in English, French, German, and Italian.
