= Cleft sentence =

Complex sentence that could be expressed in a simpler way

A cleft sentence is a complex sentence (one having a main clause and a dependent clause) that has a meaning that could be expressed by a simple sentence. Clefts typically put a particular constituent into focus. In spoken language, this focusing is often accompanied by a special intonation.

In English, a cleft sentence can be constructed as follows:

it + conjugated form of to be + X + subordinate clause

where it is a cleft pronoun and X is the cleft constituent, usually a noun phrase (although it can also be a prepositional phrase, and in some cases an adjectival or adverbial phrase). The focus is on X, or else on the subordinate clause or some element of it. For example:

- It's Joey (whom) we're looking for.
- It's money that I love.
- It was from John that she heard the news.

Furthermore, one might also describe a cleft sentence as inverted. That is to say, it has its dependent clause in front of the main clause. So, rather than (for example):

- We didn't meet her until we arrived at the hotel.

the cleft would be:

- It wasn't until we arrived at the hotel that (or when) we met her.

== Types ==
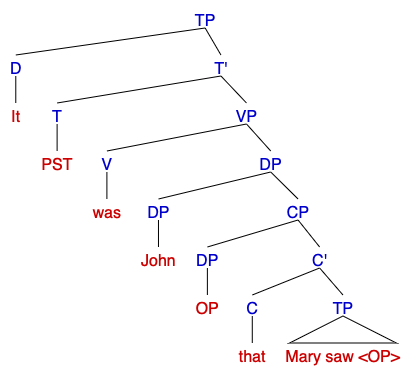
It-Cleft sentence: "It was John that Mary saw."

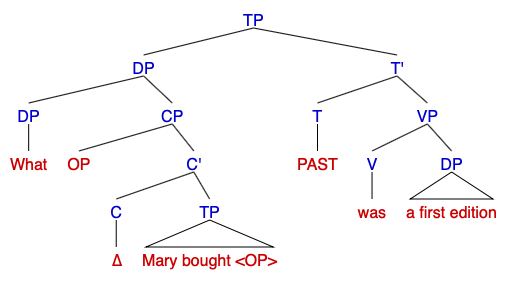
Wh-Cleft/Pseudo-Cleft sentence: "What Mary bought was a first edition."

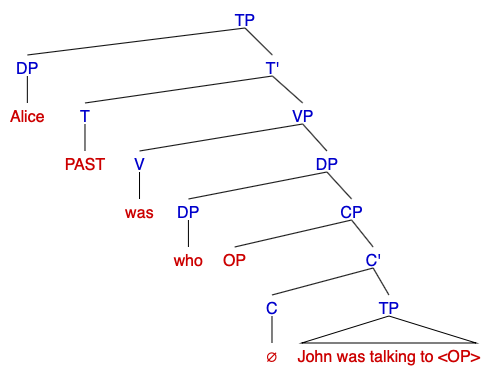
Reversed Wh-Cleft/Inverted/Pseudo-Cleft sentence: "Alice was who John was talking to."

English is very rich in cleft constructions. Below are examples of some types of clefts found in English, though the list is not exhaustive. See Lambrecht 2001 for a comprehensive survey, Collins 1991 for an in-depth analysis of it-clefts and wh-clefts in English, and Calude 2009 for an investigation of clefts in spoken English.

=== It-cleft ===
In English, it-clefts consist of the pronoun it, followed by a form of the verb to be, a cleft constituent, and a relativizer, which introduces a relative clause that is attributed to the cleft phrase. It-clefts introduce two meanings parts: (1) a presupposition that the property in the clause following the complementiser holds of some entity; and (ii) an assertion that this property holds of the entity denoted by the cleft constituent.

- English it-cleft: It was John that Mary saw.

=== Wh-cleft/Pseudo-cleft ===
In English, pseudo-clefts consist of an interrogative clause in the subject position, followed by a form of the verb be, followed by the focused element that appears at the end of the sentence. The prototypical pseudo-cleft construction uses what, while other wh-words like who, where etc. and their pro-form equivalents like thing, one, place etc. are used less frequently. Pseudo-clefts are tools for presenting and highlighting new information, serving as the building blocks of a coherent discourse progression, and a rhetorical toolkit to construct an authorial stance, being a grammatical resource for making evaluative meaning.

- English wh-cleft/pseudo-cleft: What Mary bought was a first edition.

=== Reversed wh-cleft/Inverted pseudo-cleft ===
In English, an inverted pseudo-cleft consists of the identical structure to pseudoclefting, however, the two strings around the verb be are inverted. The focus element has been brought to the front of the sentence, and the clause is sentence final.

- English reversed wh-cleft/inverted pseudo-cleft:
1. A Fiat is what he wanted to buy.
2. Alice was who John was talking to.

=== All-cleft ===
In English, all-cleft sentences are related to pseudo-clefts in which they are constructed with the subject of the sentence embedded in the phrase and expressed with the verb "to be". Where pseudo-clefts begin with a wh-phrase (what, where, who), all-clefts begin with the use of the word "all".

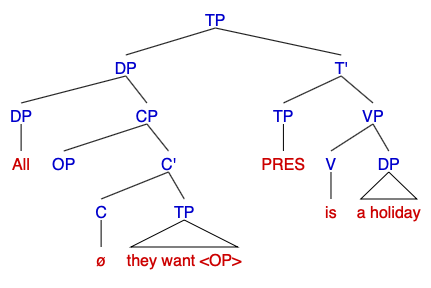
All Cleft sentence: "All they want is a holiday."

- English all-cleft:
1. All he wanted to buy was a Fiat.
2. All they want is a holiday.

=== Inferential cleft ===
In English, inferential clefts involve a subordinate clause that is embedded as a complement of the verb "to be", and the sentence begins with the subject "it". Oftentimes, an inferential cleft will include an adverb such as only, simply or just. While they are analyzed in written text, data on inferential clefts are often found in spoken language and act as a subordinate clause of the subject they are inferring.

- English inferential cleft:
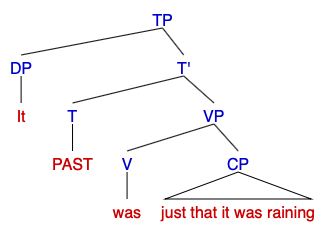
  Inferential Cleft sentence: "It was just that it was raining."
1. It is not that he loves her. It's just that he has a way with her that is different.
2. It was just that it was raining.

=== There-cleft ===
Looking at existential sentences, in all languages, they are understood to belong to a grammatically distinct construction, which is utilized to express existential positions. Cleft-sentences in English contain existential sentences that have a dummy there as a subject, be as a main verb, and an NP in the post-verbal complement position. To elaborate, dummy there can be distinguished as an adverbial, pronoun, and subject. Likewise, be can be distinguished as a main verb, and may contain other intransitive verbs such as come, remain, exist, arise, and stand. Lastly, post-verbal NP depends on the discourse of the entity or entities that refer to the novel information it is expressing.

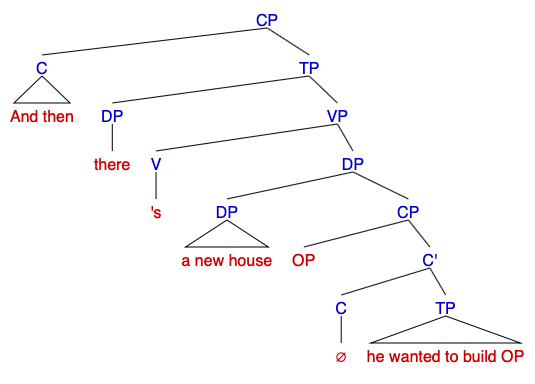
There-Cleft sentence: "And then there's a new house he wanted to build."

- English dummy there-cleft:
1. There's nobody there.
2. There seemed to be nothing he couldn't do.
- English be there-cleft: There comes a stage when a player should move on.
- English post-verbal NP there-cleft: There was George Talbot and there was Ted.
- English there-cleft: And then there's a new house he wanted to build.

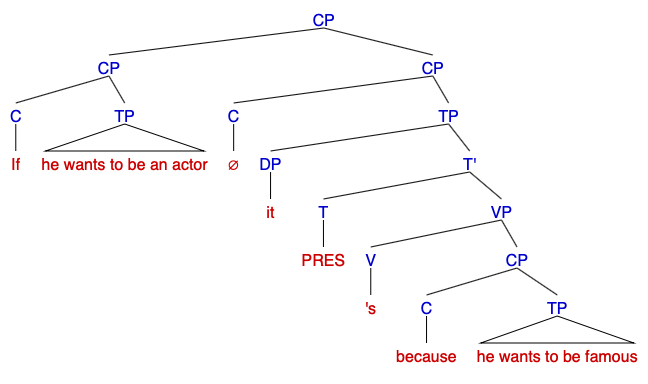
If-Because Cleft sentence: "If he wants to be an actor it's because he wants to be famous."

=== If-because cleft ===
- English if-because cleft: If he wants to be an actor it's because he wants to be famous.

=== Other languages ===
Traditional accounts of cleft structures classify these according to the elements involved following English-centric analyses (such as wh-words, the pronoun it, the quantifier all, and so on). This makes it difficult to conduct cross-linguistic investigations of clefts since these elements do not exist in all other languages, which has led to a proposal for a revision of existing cleft taxonomy (see Calude 2009).

However, not all languages are so rich in cleft types as English, and some employ other means for focusing specific constituents, such as topicalization, word order changes, focusing particles and so on (see Miller 1996). Cleftability in Language (2009) by Cheng Luo presents a cross-linguistic discussion of cleftability.

== Structural issues ==
The role of the cleft pronoun (it in the case of English) is controversial, and some believe it to be referential, while others treat it as a dummy pronoun or empty element. The former analysis has come to be termed the "expletive" view, whereas the latter is referred to as the "extraposition" approach. Hedberg (2002) proposes a hybrid approach, combining ideas from both takes on the status of the cleft pronoun. She shows that it can have a range of scopes (from semantically void to full reference) depending on the context in which it is used.

Similarly controversial is the status of the subordinate clause, often termed the "cleft clause". While most would agree that the cleft clause in wh-clefts can be analysed as some kind of relative clause (free or fused or headless), there is disagreement as to the exact nature of the relative. Traditionally, the wh-word in a cleft such as What you need is a good holiday, pertaining to the relative What you need, is understood to be the first constituent of the relative clause, and to function as its head.

Bresnan and Grimshaw (1978) posit a different analysis. They suggest that the relative clause is headed (rather than headless), with wh-word being located outside the clause proper and functioning as its head. Miller (1996) also endorses this approach, citing cross-linguistic evidence that the wh-word functions as indefinite deictics.

The cleft clause debate gets more complex with it-clefts, where researchers struggle to even agree as to the type of clause that is involved: the traditionalists claim it to be a relative clause (Huddleston and Pullum 2002), while others reject this on the basis of a lack of noun phrase antecedent (Quirk et al. 1985, Sornicola 1988, Miller 1999), as exemplified below:

- It was because he was ill that we decided to return.
- It was in September that he first found out about it.
- It was with great reluctance that Maria accepted the invitation.

The last element of a cleft is the cleft constituent, which typically corresponds to the focus. As mentioned earlier, the focused part of a cleft is typically a noun phrase, but may in fact, turn up to be just about anything:

- Prepositional phrase: It was on foot that he went there.
- Adverbial phrase: It was greedily and speedily that Homer Simpson drank his beer.
- Non-finite clause: It is to address a far-reaching problem that Oxfam is launching this campaign.
- Gerund: It could be going home early or slacking off at work that the boss reacted to.
- Adverbial clause: It was because she was so lonely all the time that she decided to move out.

Finally, the issue pertaining to cleft sentences intersects the distinction between canonical and inverse copular sententences as proposed by Andrea Moro in Moro (1997) and many others. A telling minimal pair is the Italian equivalent of

- what I don't like is strange canonical copular sentence
- what I don't like is prime numbers inverse copular sentence

The first is a canonical copular sentence, namely one where the subject is a DP on the left; the second one is an inverse copular sentence, namely one where the subject is the DP in situ and the predicate has been raised to the position canonically reserved to subject. A direct proof of this is given in language like Italian, for example, where the copula always agrees with the subject. In the inverse copula sentence it agrees with prime numbers showing the underlying structure. Similar considerations can be transferred to it-cleft sentences

== Information structure ==
Clefts have been described as "equative" (Halliday 1976), "stative" (Delin and Oberlander 1995) and as "variable-value pairs", where the cleft constituent gives a variable expressed by the cleft clause (Herriman 2004, Declerck 1994, Halliday 1994). A major area of interest with regard to cleft constructions involves their information structure. The concept of "information structure" relates to the type of information encoded in a particular utterance, that can be one of these three:

- NEW information: things that the speaker/writer expects their hearer/reader might not already know
- GIVEN information: information that the speaker/writer expects the hearer/reader may be familiar with
- INFERRABLE information: information that the speaker/writer may expect the hearer/reader to be able to infer either from world knowledge or from previous discourse

The reason why information structure plays such an important role in the area of clefts is largely due to the fact that the organisation of information structure is tightly linked to the clefts' function as focusing tools used by speakers/writers to draw attention to salient parts of their message.

While it may be reasonable to assume that the variable of a cleft (that is, the material encoded by cleft clauses) may be typically GIVEN and its value (expressed by the cleft constituent) is NEW, it is not always so. Sometimes, neither element contains new information, as is in some demonstrative clefts, e.g., That is what I think and sometimes it is the cleft clause that contains the NEW part of the message, as in And that's when I got sick (Calude 2009). Finally, in some constructions, it is the equation between cleft clause and cleft constituent that brings about the newsworthy information, rather than any of the elements of the cleft themselves (Lambrecht 2001).

== Other languages ==
=== Mandarin ===
The shì...de construction in Mandarin is used to produce the equivalent of cleft sentences. However, in traditional grammar, shì...de clefts were seen as a construction with a function in reference to the construction as a whole. Both shì, the copula, and de can occur in other contexts that express information-structural categories, but they are sometimes hard to distinguish from shì...de clefts. In addition, certain constructions with relative clauses have been referred to as "pseudo-cleft" constructions. See Chinese grammar § Cleft sentences for details.

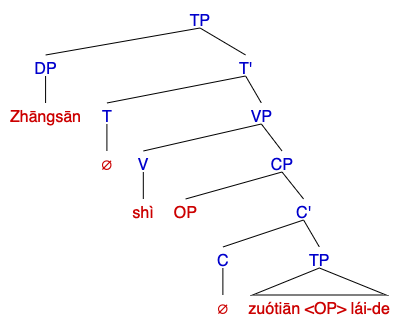
Mandarin Cleft sentence (ex.1): "Zhāngsān shì zuótiān lái-de."

Examples:

Zhāngsān shì zuótiān lái-de.
Zhangsan COP yesterday come-DE‍
"It was yesterday that Zhangsan came."

Zhāngsān shì míngtiān lái.
Zhangsan COP tomorrow come
"Concerning Zhangsan, it is the case that he will come tomorrow."

Zhāngsān zuótiān lái-de.
Zhangsan yesterday come-DE‍
"It was yesterday that Zhangsan came."

=== Spanish ===
Several constructions play the role of cleft sentences in Spanish. A very common resource is the adding of "es que" (time-dependent). Similar to English cleft sentences, time-dependent cleft constructions in Spanish also share a temporal relationship between the verb of the relative clause and the copula.

¿Cómo es que vas?
how is.PRS-3sg that go.PRS.PROG-2sg
"How is it that you're going?"

¿Adónde fue que fuiste?
Where is.PST-3sg that go.PST-2sg
"Where was it that you went?"

From uncleft ¿Adónde fuiste?

Another mechanism is the use of the identificating structure, or relative pronouns, "el/la que", "el/la cual" as well as the neuters: "lo que" and "lo cual". This form of cleft construction highlights an importance between the entity and the number and gender of said entity that is uttered in a cleft sentence.

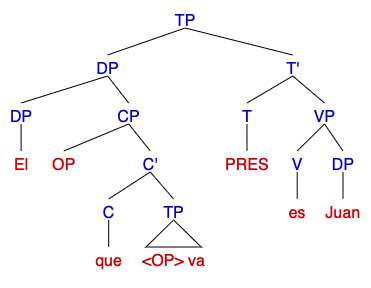
Spanish Cleft sentence (ex.3): "El que va es Juan."

El que va es Juan
He that go.PRS-3sg is.PRS-sg Juan
"Who's going is John."

Lo que no quiero es ir
It.N that NEG want.PRS-1sg is.PRS-3sg go.INF
"What I don't want is to go."

Possible uncleft variants: No quiero ir, Ir no quiero

Furthermore, one can also utilize "cuando" and "donde" when one wants to refer to "that" in a frame of time or place.

Fue en Londres donde nací
Is.PST-3sg in London where born.PST-1sg
"It was in London that I was born."

"Fue en Londres donde nací" (It was in London that I was born), possible uncleft variants Nací en Londres

=== French ===
In French, when a cleft is used to reply to a wh-question, it can appear in a complete form Matrix 'C'est XP' + relative clause 'que/qui YP' or in a reduced form Matrix 'C'est XP'.

Example:

- "C'est Jean que je cherche" (It's Jean whom I'm looking for)
- "C'est à Paris que j'habite" (It's in Paris where I live)

Example with Gloss:

Cleft sentences are the most natural way to answer a wh-question in French. For example, if one were to ask:

a.

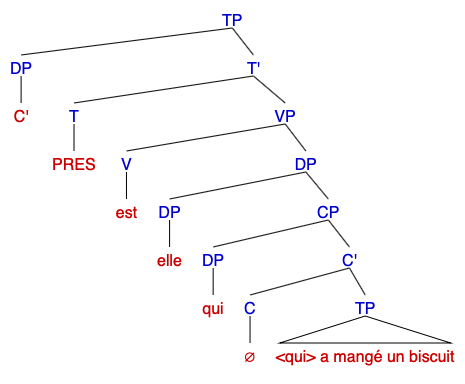
French Cleft sentence (ex.b): "C'est Ella qui a mangé un biscuit."

Qui est ce qui a mangé un biscuit?
Who is-PRS-3SG it-SG that 3.SG ate-3SG.PST a.M biscuit-NOM.SG?
Who ate a cookie?

It would be answered with the following it-cleft:

b.

C' est Ella qui a mangé un biscuit
It is-PRS.3SG Ella that 3SG ate-3SG.PST a.M cookie-NOM.SG
"It is Ella that ate a cookie"

=== Japanese ===
The X no wa (ga) construction in Japanese is frequently used to produce the equivalent of cleft sentences. In addition, a gap precedes its filler in both subject cleft (SC) constructions and object cleft (OC) constructions. Japanese speakers have reported that there is an object gap preference in Japanese cleft constructions due to temporal structural ambiguities in subject clefts.

Example:

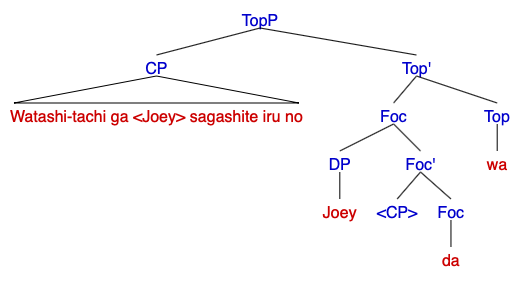
Japanese Cleft sentence (ex.1): "Watashi-tachi ga sagashite iru no wa Joey da." – Adapted from Hiraiwa & Ishiwara (2012)

Watashitachi ga sagashite iru no wa Joey da.
We NOM look.for PRES C TOP Joey COP
"It's Joey whom we're looking for."

Example of a subject cleft construction:

Kyonen <gap> sobo-o inaka-de kaihoushita-nowa shinseki-da-to haha-ga it-ta.
{Last year} {} grandma-ACC village-LOC nursed-NOWA‍ relative-COP-COMP mother-NOM say-PAST
"Mother said it is the relative who nursed my grandmother last year at the village."

Example of an object cleft construction:

Kyonen sobo-ga <gap> inaka-de kaihoushita-nowa shinseki-da-to haha-ga it-ta.
{Last year} Grandma-NOM {} village-LOC nursed-NOWA‍ relative-COP-COMP mother-NOM say-PAST
"Mother said it is the relative whom my grandmother nursed last year at the village."

=== Goidelic languages ===
The construction is frequent in the Goidelic languages (Scottish Gaelic, Irish, and Manx), much more so than in English, and can be used in ways that would be ambiguous or ungrammatical in English: almost any element of a sentence can be clefted. That sometimes carries over into the local varieties of English (Highland English, Lowland Scots, Scottish English, Hiberno-English).

The following examples from Scottish Gaelic are based on the sentence "Chuala Iain an ceòl a-raoir", "Iain heard the music last night":

- 'S e Iain a chuala an ceòl a-raoir ("It's Iain who heard the music last night" e.g. as opposed to Mary)
- 'S e an ceòl a chuala Iain a-raoir ("It's the music that Iain heard last night" e.g. as opposed to the speech)
- 'S ann a-raoir a chuala Iain an ceòl ("It's last night that Iain heard the music" e.g. as opposed to last week)
- 'S ann a chuala Iain an ceòl a-raoir ("It's heard that Iain the music last night" e.g. as opposed to making the music)

=== Tagalog ===
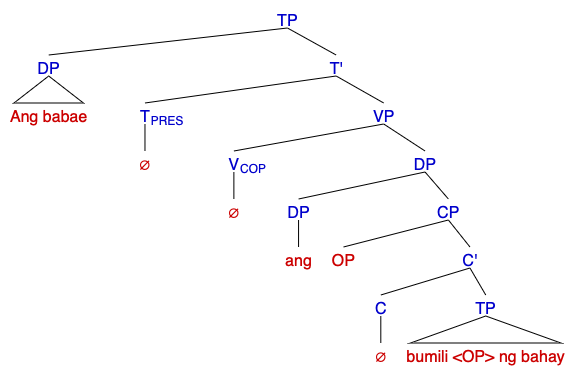
Tagalog Cleft sentence (ex.1): "Ang babae and bumili ng bahay."

Cleft sentences in Tagalog are copula constructions in which the focused element serves as the predicate of the sentence.

Ang babae ang bumili ng bahay.
NOM woman NOM ACT.bought ACC house
"The (one who) bought the house was the woman."

Si Juan ang binigyan ni Pedro ng pera.
NOM Juan NOM gave.PASS GEN Pedro ACC money
"The (one to whom) Pedro had given money was Juan."
(or: "The (one who) was given money to by Pedro was Juan.")

In the examples in (1) and (2), the foci are in bold. The remaining portions of the cleft sentences in (1) and (2) are noun phrases that contain headless relative clauses. (NB: Tagalog does not have an overt copula.)

This construction is also used for WH-questions in Tagalog, when the WH-word used in the question is either sino "who" or ano "what", as illustrated in (3) and (4).

Sino ang bumili ng bahay?
who.NOM NOM ACT.bought ACC house
"Who bought the house?"
(or: "Who was the (one who) bought the house?")

Ano ang ibinigay ni Pedro kay Juan?
what NOM gave.PASS GEN Pedro DAT Juan
"What did Pedro give to Juan?"
(or: "What was the (thing that) was given to Juan by Pedro?")
