= History of Oriental Orthodoxy =

Oriental Orthodoxy is the communion of Eastern Christian churches that held distinct Miaphysite Christology and recognize only first three ecumenical councils—the First Council of Nicaea, the First Council of Constantinople and the Council of Ephesus. They reject the dogmatic definitions of the Council of Chalcedon. Hence, these churches are also called Old Oriental Churches or non-Chalcedonian churches.

== Foundation ==
Much like other Eastern Christian communions and the Catholic Church in the West, history of Oriental Orthodoxy ultimately dated back to the beginnings of Christianity, as their institutional and ecclesiastical presence was once part of both Great Church and later Nicene Christianity.

== Missionary roles ==
The Oriental Orthodox Churches had a great missionary role during the early stages of Christianity and played a great role in the history of Egypt.

Coptic Orthodoxy spread to Nubia during sixth century, with support from Empress Theodora and later, to Axumite Ethiopia. Armenian Church spread unto neighboring Caucasian Albania and remained so until early Muslim conquests. Syriac Orthodoxy on the other hand, spread unto Mesopotamia and to Arab Ghassanid Kingdom.

== Chalcedonian schism ==
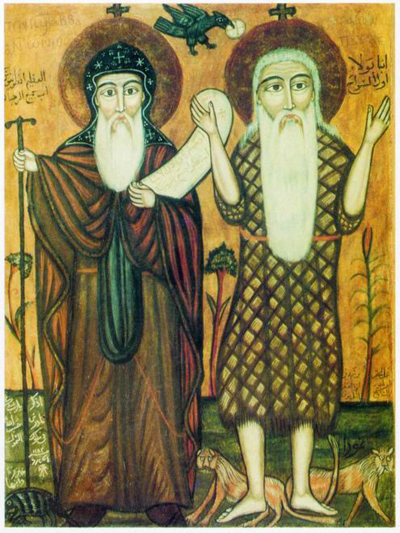
Coptic icon of Saint Anthony and Saint Paul

According to the canons of the Oriental Orthodox Churches, the four bishops of Rome, Alexandria, Ephesus (later transferred to Constantinople) and Antioch were all given status as patriarchs, the ancient apostolic centers of Christianity by the First Council of Nicaea (predating the schism). Each patriarch was responsible for the bishops and churches within his own area of the universal catholic Church (with the exception of the patriarch of Jerusalem, who was independent of the rest) with the Bishop of Rome as "first among equals" as the successor to Peter and seat of the Petrine Ministry of unity and authority.

The schism between Oriental Orthodoxy and the rest of the Roman state church occurred in the 5th century. The separation resulted in part from the refusal of Dioscorus, the patriarch of Alexandria, to accept the Christological dogmas promulgated by the Council of Chalcedon on Jesus's two natures (divine and human). The Oriental churches accepted that Christ had two natures, but insisted that those two natures are inseparable and united. Dioscorus would accept only "of or from two natures" but not "in two natures." To the hierarchs who would lead the Oriental Orthodox, the Chalcedonian proclamation was tantamount to Nestorianism, which they rejected. Arising in the Alexandrian School of Theology, Miaphysitism advocated a formula stressing the unity of the Incarnation over all other considerations.

The Oriental Orthodox churches were therefore often called monophysite, although they reject this label, as it is associated with Eutychian Monophysitism. They prefer the term "non-Chalcedonian" or "Miaphysite" churches. Oriental Orthodox churches reject what they consider to be the heretical Monophysite teachings of Eutyches and of Nestorius as well as the Dyophysite definition of the Council of Chalcedon. As a result, the Oriental patriarchs were excommunicated by the bishops of Rome and Constantinople in 451, formalizing the schism.

Christology, although important, was not the only reason for the Coptic and Syriac rejection of the Council of Chalcedon; political, ecclesiastical and imperial issues were hotly debated during that period.

== Failed attempts towards reconciliation ==
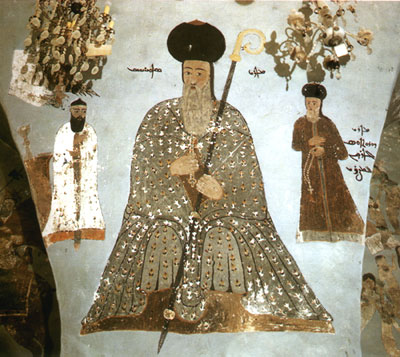
Severus of Antioch

In 482, Byzantine emperor Zeno made an attempt to reconcile Christological differences between the supporters and opponents of the Chalcedonian Definition by issuing an imperial decree known as the Henotikon, but those efforts were mainly politically motivated and ultimately proved to be unsuccessful in reaching a true and substantial reconciliation.

In the years following the Henotikon, the patriarch of Constantinople remained in formal communion with the non-Chalcedonian patriarchs of Alexandria, Antioch, and Jerusalem, while Rome remained out of communion with them and in unstable communion with Constantinople (see: Acacian schism). It was not until 518 that the new Byzantine Emperor, Justin I (who accepted Chalcedon), demanded that the entire church in the Roman Empire accept the council's decisions. Justin ordered the replacement of all non-Chalcedonian bishops, including the patriarchs of Antioch and Alexandria.

During the reign of emperor Justinian I (527–565), new attempts were made towards reconciliation through common ground in rejecting Nestorianism, this involved condemnation of three major figures whose writings were suspected to be Nestorian. This condemnation that culminated in the Second Council of Constantinople however, not only failed to achieve desired reconciliation but also triggered another schism in the West.

One of the most prominent Oriental Orthodox theologians of that era was Severus of Antioch. In spite of several, imperially sponsored meetings between heads of Oriental Orthodox and Eastern Orthodox communities, no final agreement was reached. The split proved to be final, and by that time parallel ecclesiastical structures were formed throughout the Near East. The most prominent Oriental Orthodox leader in the middle of the 6th century was Jacob Baradaeus, who was considered the theological leader, known from that time as "Jacobite" Christians.

== Between Byzantine and Persian empires ==
During the 6th and 7th centuries, frequent wars between the Byzantine Empire and the Sasanian Empire (Persia) throughout the Middle East greatly affected all Christians in the region including the Oriental Orthodox, especially in Armenia, Byzantine Syria and Byzantine Egypt. Temporary Persian conquest of all those regions during the great Byzantine–Sasanian War of 602–628 resulted in further estrangement between Oriental Orthodox communities of the region and the Byzantine imperial government in Constantinople. Those relations did not improve after the Byzantine reconquest, despite efforts by emperor Heraclius to strengthen political control of the region by achieving religious reunification of divided Christian communities. In order to reach a Christological compromise between Oriental Orthodox and Eastern Orthodox, he supported monoenergism and monothelitism, but with no success.

== Arab conquest and its aftermath ==
=== Challenges of Islamization ===
Following the Muslim conquest of the Middle East in the 7th century, a process of gradual Islamization was initiated, affecting all Christians in the region, including the Oriental Orthodox. The Oriental Orthodox communities, mainly Syriac and Coptic, were gradually displaced by Muslims, but a minority endured, preserving their Christian faith and culture.

=== Ottoman conquest and the millet system ===
During the first half of the 16th century, the entire Near East fell under the control of the Ottoman Empire. Syria and Egypt were conquered during the Ottoman–Mamluk War (1516–17), and Oriental Orthodox communities in the region faced a new political reality that would determine their history until the beginning of the 20th century. Ottoman government introduced the millet system that granted a certain degree of autonomy to non-Islamic religious communities, including Oriental Orthodox Christians.

== Persecution of Oriental Orthodoxy ==
One of the most salient features of Oriental Orthodoxy has been the ceaseless persecution and massacres its adherents have suffered throughout history, initially under the Byzantines and Sassanids, and later rule by various successive Muslim dynasties. Anti-Oriental Orthodox sentiments in the Byzantine Empire were motivated by religious divisions within Christianity after the Council of Chalcedon in 451. Persecutions occurred mainly in Egypt and some other eastern provinces of the Byzantine Empire during the reigns of emperors Marcian (450–457) and Leo I (457–474). There also was persecution under the Adal Sultanate and the Kingdom of Semien.

The Muslim conquest of Egypt took place in AD 639, during the Byzantine Empire. Despite the political upheaval, Egypt remained a mainly Christian, but Copts lost their majority status after the 14th century, as a result of the intermittent persecution and the destruction of the Christian churches there, accompanied by heavy taxes for those who refused to convert. From the Muslim conquest of Egypt onwards, the Coptic Christians were persecuted by different Muslims regimes, such as the Umayyad Caliphate, Abbasid Caliphate, Fatimid Caliphate, Mamluk Sultanate, and Ottoman Empire; the persecution of Coptic Christians included closing and demolishing churches and forced conversion to Islam. Their persecution persists to this day. Christians comprise around 10% of Egypt's population and the overwhelming majority is Oriental Orthodox. Recent significant attacks targeting Coptic Christians include the bombing of two churches during Palm Sunday in 2017, which killed 49 people, and the execution of 29 pilgrims traveling to a monastery in May of that same year.

In modern times, persecutions of Oriental Orthodox Christians culminated in Ottoman systematic persecutions of Armenian Christians and Assyrian Christians that led to the Armenian genocide and Assyrian genocide during the first World War.

On April 23, 2015, the Armenian Apostolic Church canonized all the victims of the Armenian genocide; this service is believed to be the largest canonization service in history. Approximately 1.5 million is the most frequently published number of victims, however, estimates vary from 700,000 to 1,800,000. It was the first canonization by the Armenian Apostolic Church in four hundred years.

== Modern day ==
The Oriental Orthodox communion comprises six groups: Coptic Orthodox, Syriac Orthodox, Ethiopian Orthodox, Eritrean Orthodox, Malankara Orthodox Syrian Church, and Armenian Apostolic churches. These six churches, while being in communion with each other are completely independent hierarchically and have no shared patriarch.

By the 20th century the Chalcedonian schism was not seen with the same relevance, and several meetings between Roman Catholicism and Oriental Orthodoxy yielded reconciliation statements signed by the Oriental Patriarch (Mar Ignatius Zakka I Iwas) and the Pope (John Paul II) in 1984.

The confusions and schisms that occurred between their Churches in the later centuries, they realize today, in no way affect or touch the substance of their faith, since these arose only because of differences in terminology and culture and in the various formulae adopted by different theological schools to express the same matter. Accordingly, we find today no real basis for the sad divisions and schisms that subsequently arose between us concerning the doctrine of Incarnation. In words and life we confess the true doctrine concerning Christ our Lord, notwithstanding the differences in interpretation of such a doctrine which arose at the time of the Council of Chalcedon.

== Ecumenical relations ==
After the historical Conference of Addis Ababa in 1965, major Oriental Orthodox churches have developed the practice of mutual theological consultations and joint approach to ecumenical relations with other Christian churches and denominations, particularly with Eastern Orthodox churches and the Anglican Communion. Renewed discussions between Oriental Orthodox and Eastern Orthodox theologians were mainly focused on christological questions regarding various differences between monophysitism and miaphysitism. On the other hand, dialogue between Oriental Orthodox and Anglican theologians was also focused on some additional pneumatological questions. In 2001, the joint "Anglican-Oriental Orthodox International Commission" was created. In the following years, the Commission produced several important theological statements. Finally in 2017, Oriental Orthodox and Anglican theologians met in Dublin and signed an agreement on various theological questions regarding the Holy Spirit. The statement of agreement has confirmed the Anglican readiness to omit the Filioque interpolation from the Creed.

== See also ==
- Conference of Addis Ababa
- History of Christianity
- Coptic history

== Bibliography ==
- Betts, Robert B. (1978). Christians in the Arab East: A Political Study (2nd rev. ed.). Athens: Lycabettus Press. ISBN 9780804207966.
- Charles, Robert H. (2007) [1916]. The Chronicle of John, Bishop of Nikiu: Translated from Zotenberg's Ethiopic Text. Merchantville, NJ: Evolution Publishing. ISBN 9781889758879.
- Krikorian, Mesrob K. (2010). Christology of the Oriental Orthodox Churches: Christology in the Tradition of the Armenian Apostolic Church. Peter Lang. ISBN 9783631581216.
- Meyendorff, John (1989). Imperial unity and Christian divisions: The Church 450–680 A.D. The Church in history. Vol. 2. Crestwood, NY: St. Vladimir's Seminary Press. ISBN 9780881410563.
- Ostrogorsky, George (1956). History of the Byzantine State. Oxford: Basil Blackwell.
