= Oriental Orthodox Churches =

Branch of Eastern Christianity

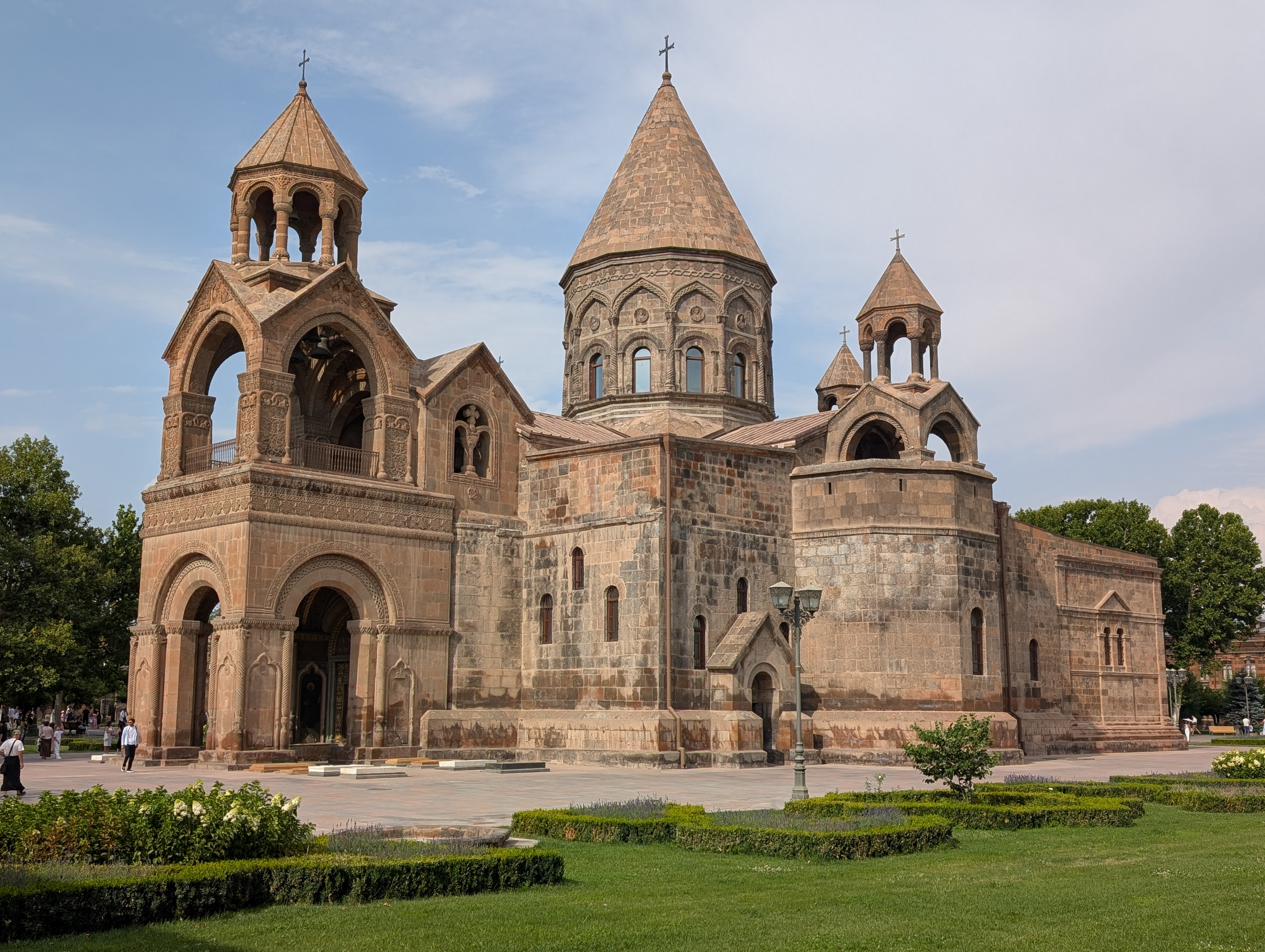
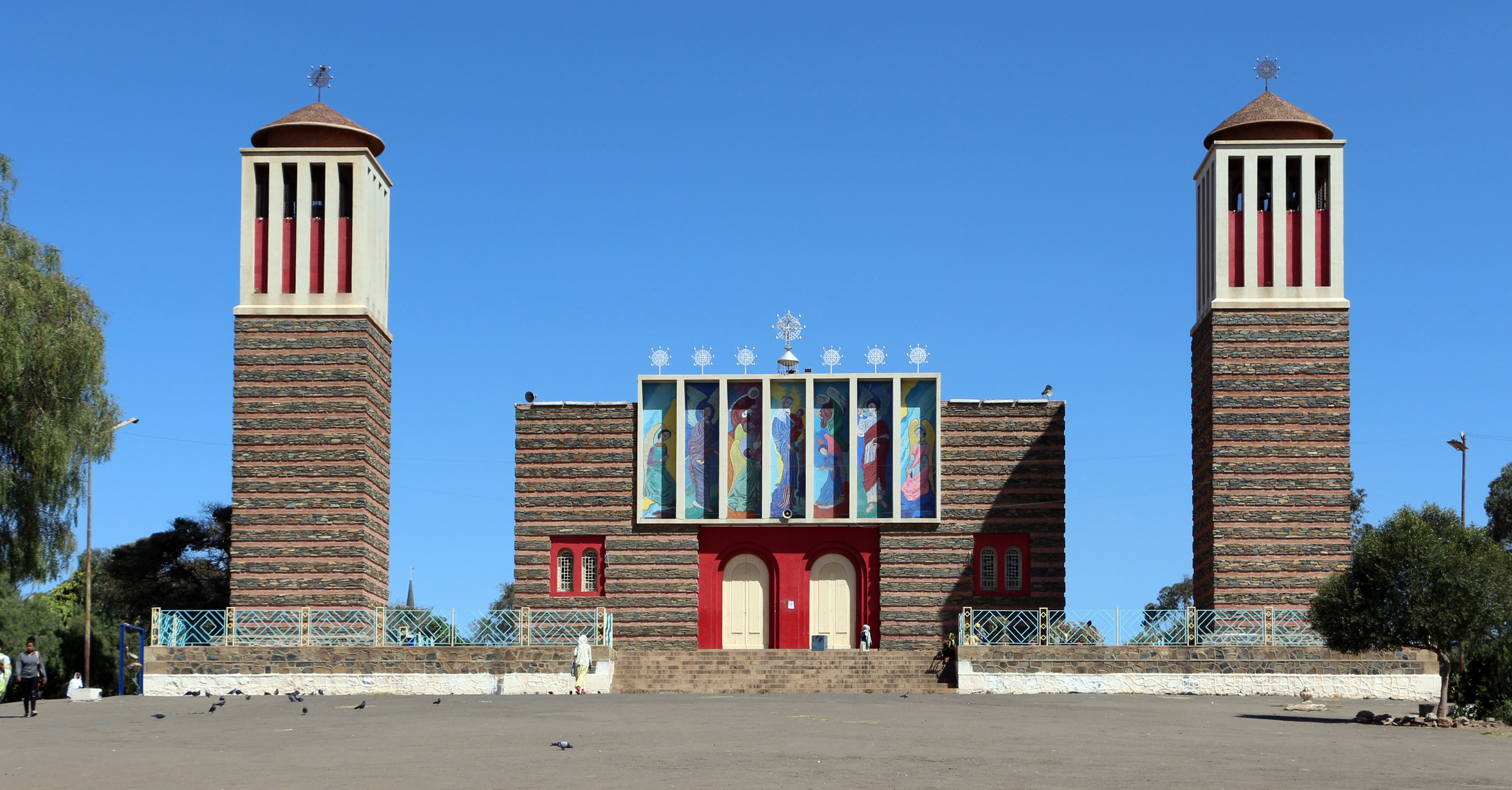
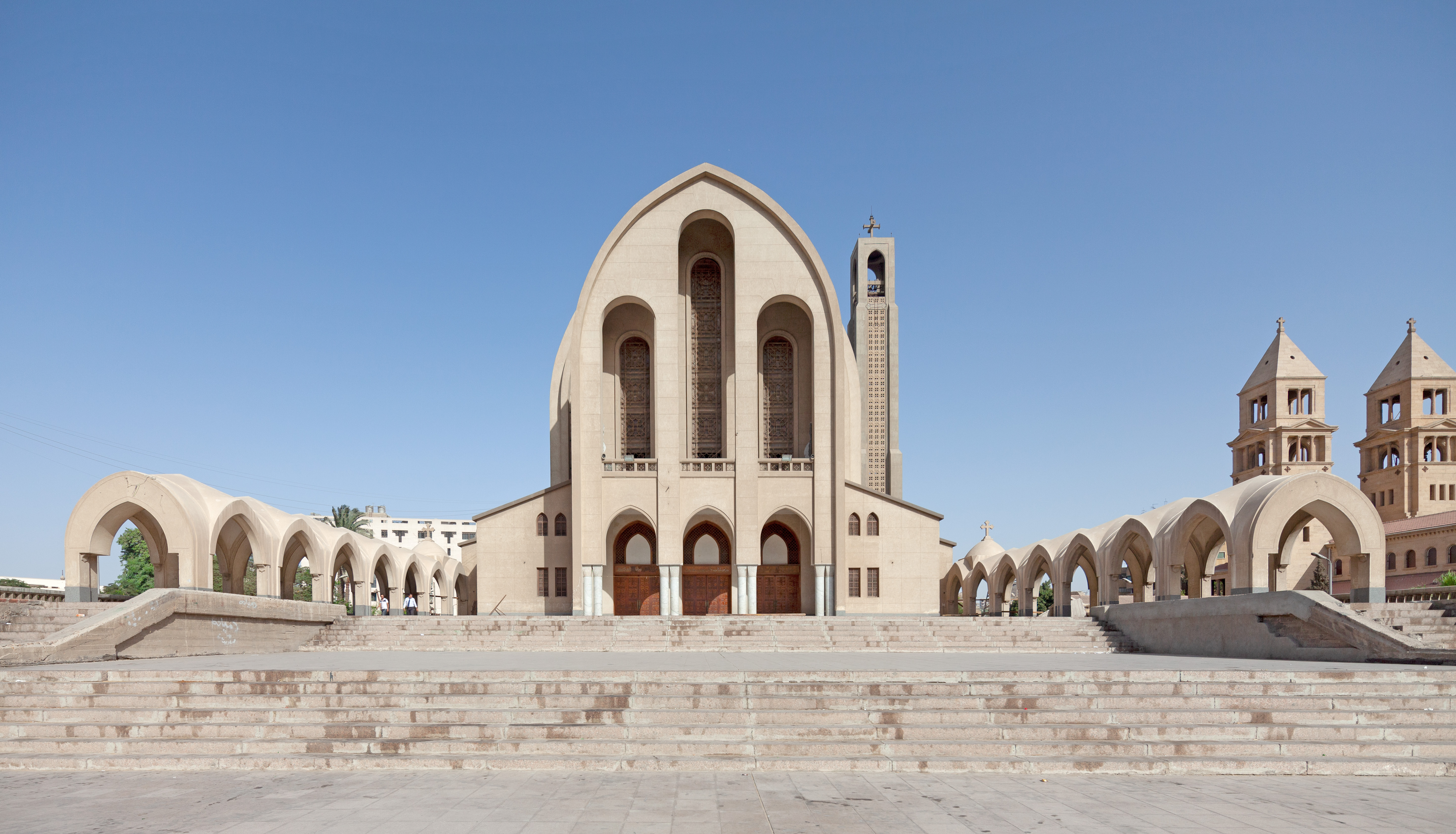
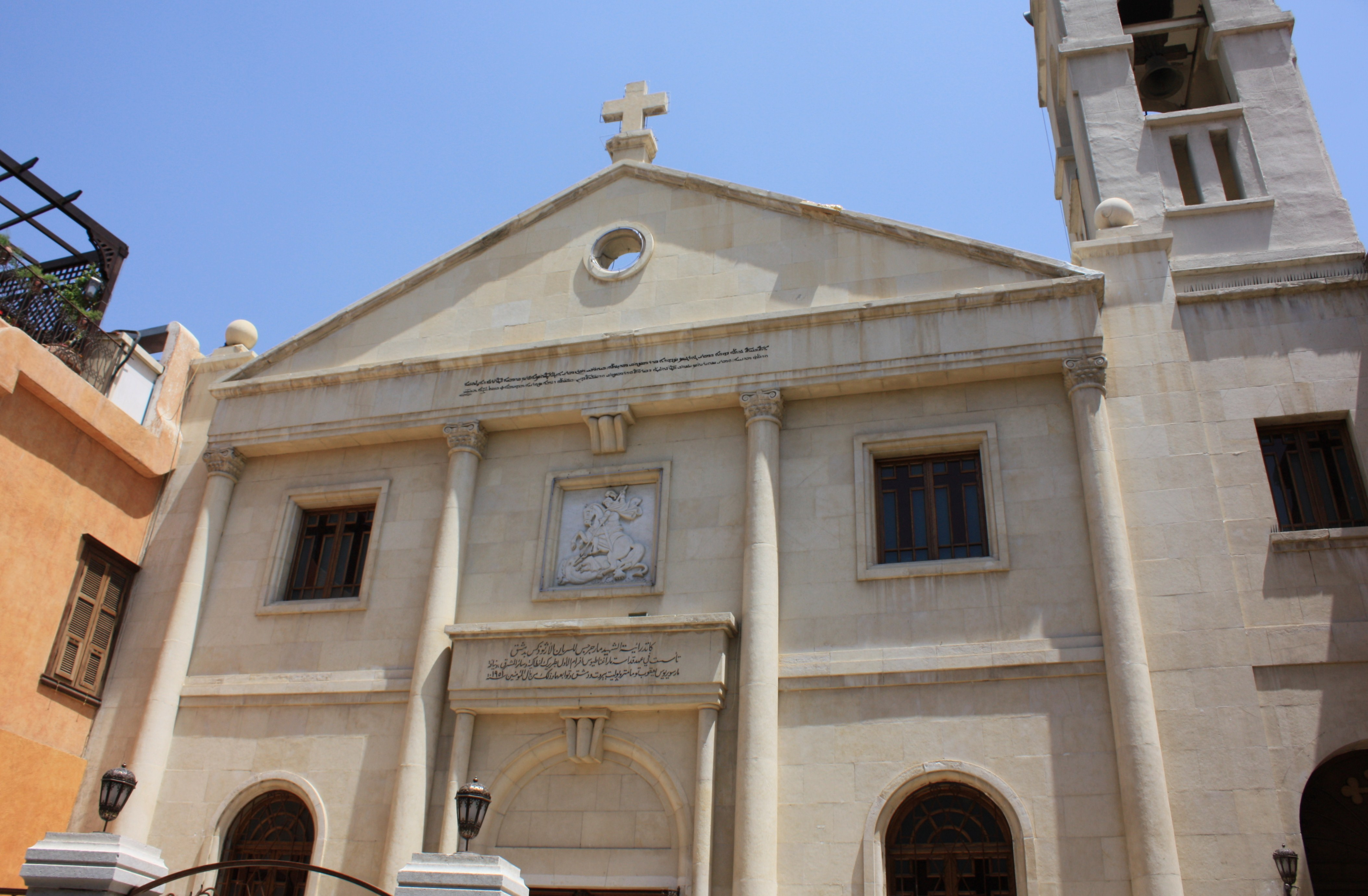
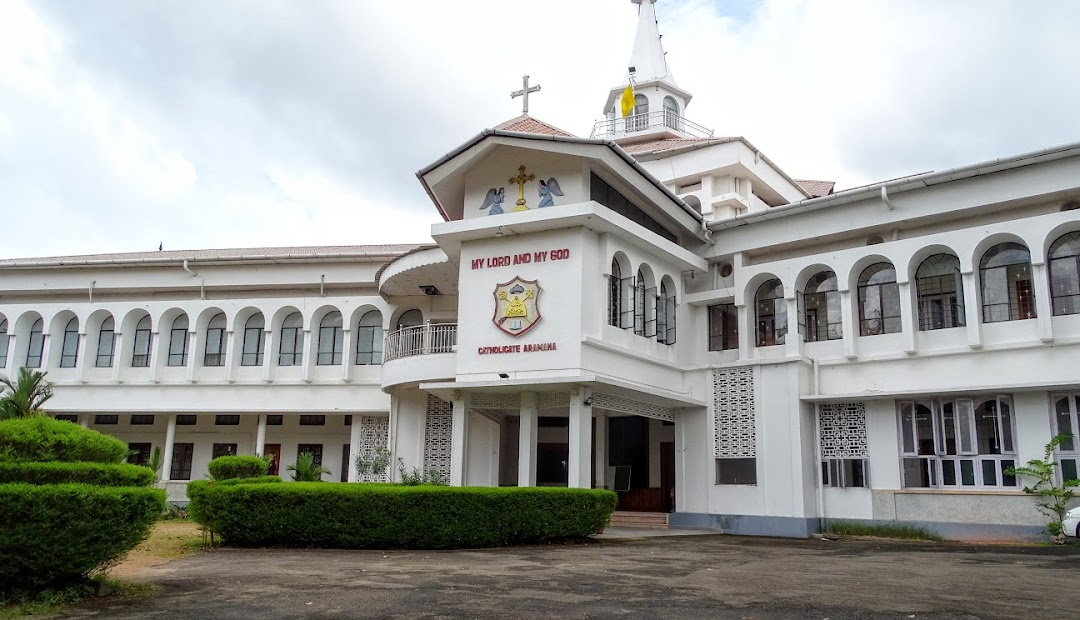
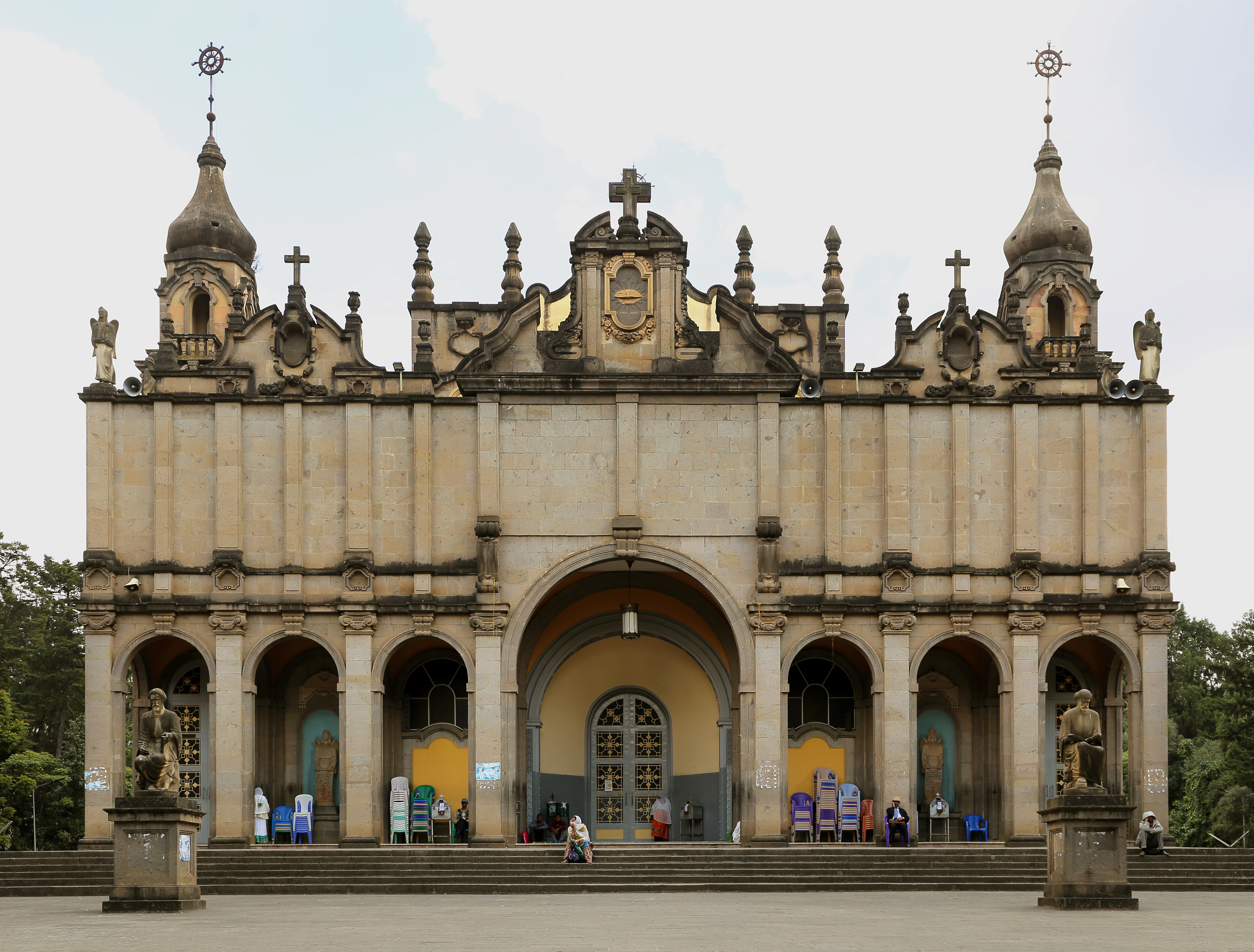
- Clockwise from top: Etchmiadzin Armenian Apostolic Cathedral; Saint Mark's Coptic Orthodox Cathedral; Malankara Orthodox Catholicate Palace; Holy Trinity Ethiopian Orthodox Cathedral; Saint George Syriac Orthodox Cathedral; Enda Mariam Eritrean Orthodox Cathedral
- Classification: Non-Chalcedonian
- Orientation: Eastern Christianity
- Theology: Oriental Orthodox theology
- Polity: Episcopal
- Structure: Communion
- Autocephalous churches: Ethiopian Orthodox Tewahedo Church; Coptic Orthodox Church; Armenian Apostolic Church; Malankara Orthodox Syrian Church; Syriac Orthodox Church; Eritrean Orthodox Tewahedo Church
- Language: Coptic; Classical Syriac; Geʽez; Armenian; Malayalam; Koine Greek; local languages
- Liturgy: Alexandrian; West Syriac; Armenian
- Founder: Jesus Christ, according to sacred tradition
- Separated from: Roman state church
- Members: 71,865,000 (2020)
- Other names: Oriental Orthodoxy; Miaphysite churches; Oriental Orthodox Communion

The Oriental Orthodox Churches are a communion of Eastern Christian churches adhering to Miaphysite Christology. In 2020, it was estimated that the Oriental Orthodox Churches had 72 million members. The Oriental Orthodox Churches adhere to the Nicene Christian tradition. Oriental Orthodoxy is one of the oldest branches in Christianity.

As some of the oldest religious institutions in the world, the Oriental Orthodox Churches have played a prominent role in the history and culture of countries and regions such as Armenia, Egypt, Eritrea, Ethiopia, Sudan, the Levant, Iraq and the Malabar region of southern India. As autocephalous churches, their bishops are equal by virtue of episcopal ordination. Their doctrines recognize only the first three ecumenical councils as valid.

The Oriental Orthodox communion is composed of six autocephalous national churches: the Coptic Orthodox Church of Alexandria; the Syriac Orthodox Church of Antioch and its constituent the Jacobite Syrian Christian Church in India; the Armenian Apostolic Church comprising the autocephalous Catholicosate of Etchmiadzin in Armenia and the Catholicosate of Cilicia in the Levant and of diaspora; the Malankara Orthodox Syrian Church, the Ethiopian Orthodox Tewahedo Church, and the Eritrean Orthodox Tewahedo Church.

The Malabar Independent Syrian Church—based in India—and the British Orthodox Church in the UK are independent Oriental Orthodox churches, having formerly been part of one of the mainstream Oriental Orthodox churches.

Oriental Orthodox Christians consider themselves to be the one, holy, catholic, and apostolic Church founded by Jesus Christ in his Great Commission, and its bishops as the successors of Christ's apostles. Three primary rites are practiced by the churches: the western-influenced Armenian Rite, the West Syriac Rite of the Syriac Church (including its Malankara Rite) and the Alexandrian Rite of the Copts (including the Ge'ez rite of the Ethiopians and Eritreans).

Oriental Orthodox Churches shared communion with the imperial Roman church before the Council of Chalcedon in AD 451, and with the Church of the East until the Synod of Beth Lapat in AD 484, separating primarily over differences in Christology.

The majority of Oriental Orthodox Christians live in Egypt, Ethiopia, Eritrea, India, Syria, Turkey and Armenia, with smaller Syriac communities in Western Asia decreasing due to persecution. There are also many in other parts of the world, formed through diaspora, conversions, and missionary activity.

== Name and characteristics ==
The name "Oriental Orthodox Churches" was formally adopted at the Conference of Addis Ababa in 1965. At the time there were five participating churches, the Eritrean Church not yet being autocephalous.

Other names by which the churches have been known include Old Oriental, Ancient Oriental, Lesser Eastern, Anti-Chalcedonian, Non-Chalcedonian, Pre-Chalcedonian, Miaphysite or Monophysite. The Catholic Church has referred to these churches as "the Ancient Churches of the East."

The Oriental Orthodox Churches are in full communion with each other, but not with the Eastern Orthodox Church or any other churches. Like the Roman Catholics or Eastern Orthodox, the Oriental Orthodox Churches includes several self-governing churches. Slow dialogue towards restoring communion between the Eastern and Oriental Orthodox groups was renewed in the mid-20th century; and dialogue is also underway between Oriental Orthodoxy and the Catholic Church, and others. In 2017, for example, the mutual recognition of baptism was restored between the Coptic Orthodox Church of Alexandria and the Catholic Church. Baptism is also mutually recognized between the Armenian Apostolic Church and the Catholic Church.

The Oriental Orthodox Churches are generally considered to be more conservative with regard to social issues. All mainstream Oriental Orthodox Churches are members of the World Council of Churches.

== History ==
=== 1st century–Chalcedon ===
Early Christians established prominent churches throughout the Middle East and North Africa, most notably Antioch, Jerusalem, Alexandria, and Constantinople. Other prominent sees were established in present-day Sudan and Ethiopia, according to John Chrysostom. These churches, altogether, formed the state church of the Roman Empire by 381.

After Christological controversies denouncing Arianism and Nestorianism was proclaimed through the imperial Roman church from the ecumenical councils of Nicaea and Ephesus, the churches comprising the state-sanctioned and recognized Roman church would then schism over Miaphysitism and Chalcedonianism. Amongst those accepting the Chalcedonian Definition at the Council of Chalcedon, those now-Greek Orthodox and Roman Catholic churches believed that Christ is "one person in two natures."

To the hierarchs who would lead Oriental Orthodoxy, the description of Christ as "one person in two natures" was tantamount to accepting the once-condemned Nestorianism, which expressed itself in a terminology incompatible with their understanding of Christology. Nestorianism was understood as seeing Christ in two separate natures—human and divine—each with different actions and experiences; in contrast Cyril of Alexandria advocated the formula "one nature of God the Incarnate Logos" (or as others translate, "one Incarnate nature of the Word").

=== Post-Chalcedonian schism ===
Following the Chalcedonian council, the majority of the early Church of Alexandria, Antioch, and Armenia rejected the terms of the council. This would later cause the predominantly-Greek, Chalcedonian minority to establish the Greek Orthodox Church of Alexandria, separate from the Coptic Orthodox Church of Alexandria. It would also lead to schisms in Antioch, resulting in the separate Syriac Orthodox, Melkite Catholic, and Greek Orthodox Church of Antioch.

The Oriental Orthodox Churches were therefore often called "monophysite" by the imperial Roman Christians—although they continually reject this label—as it is associated with Eutychian monophysitism; they prefer the term "miaphysite." The Oriental Orthodox would later be accused of Eutychian monophysitism by Evangelical Protestants proselytizing in predominantly Eastern and Oriental Orthodox regions.

In the years following Chalcedon, the patriarchs of Constantinople intermittently remained in communion with the non-Chalcedonian patriarchs of Alexandria and Antioch (see Henotikon), while Rome remained out of communion with the latter and in unstable communion with Constantinople. It was not until 518 that the new Byzantine Emperor, Justin I—who accepted Chalcedon—demanded that the church in the Roman Empire accept the council's decisions.

=== Under Islamic conquest ===
During the early Muslim conquests, Egypt was conquered from the Eastern Romans/Byzantines. According to Coptic bishop John of Nikiû, the Muslims "despoiled the Egyptians of their possessions and dealt cruelly with them" whilst also noting Amr ibn al-As "took none of the property of the Churches, and he committed no act of spoilation or plunder, and he preserved them throughout all his days." Despite the conquest of Egypt and initial peace between Christians and Muslims, Egypt's Umayyad rulers taxed Christians at a higher rate than Muslims, driving merchants towards Islam and undermining the economic base of the Coptic Church. Although the Coptic Orthodox Church did not disappear, the Umayyad tax policies made it difficult for the church to retain the Egyptian elites.

Within Roman Syria and during the Muslim conquest of the Levant, John III of the Sedre and other Syriac Orthodox bishops were brought before Umayr ibn Sad al-Ansari to engage in an open debate regarding Christianity and represent the entire Christian community—including non-Syriac Orthodox communities, such as Greek Orthodox Syrians.

Since the early Muslim conquests, Oriental Orthodox Christians have endured moments of peace and persecution between themselves and the Arab-Islamic communities governing the Middle East and North Africa. The Copts have endured persecution into the 21st century, with some facing abduction and forced conversion. The Armenian and Syriac Orthodox churches also faced persecution and genocide, with the one Syriac scholar stating, "Oriental Christianity was literally decimated finally through the cruel representative of the Mongolian-Islamic fanaticism."

=== Attempted reunions ===
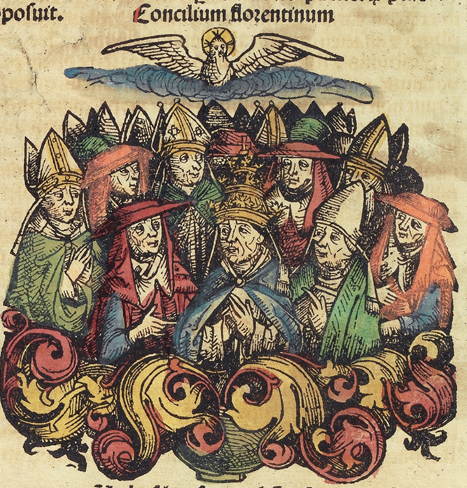
Council of Florence, from the Nuremberg Chronicle by Hartmann Schedel

By 862, the Armenian Apostolic and Syriac Orthodox churches held the Council of Shirakavan with the Eastern Orthodox Church in efforts to seek Christian unity and clarify Christological positions. By the 12th century, the Council of Hromkla was held between the Armenians and the Greeks, to finalize an attempted union with the Eastern Orthodox Church.

In the 15th century, during the Council of Basel-Ferrara-Florence, the Oriental Orthodox attempted to enter full communion with the Roman Catholics and the Eastern Orthodox.

=== 19th–early 20th centuries ===
==== Attempted Western missions and schisms ====
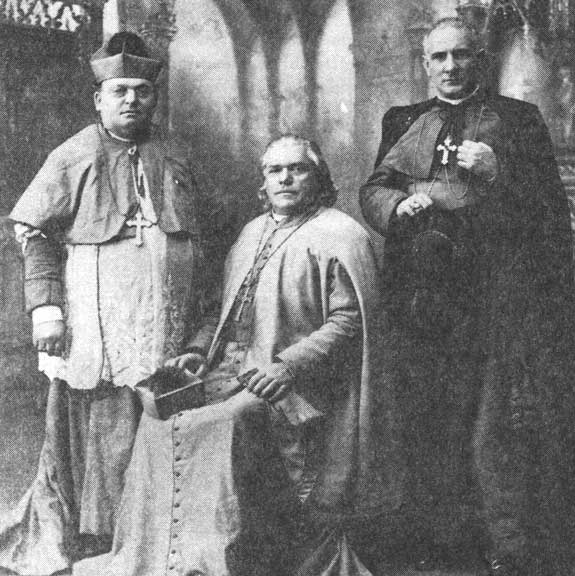
Joseph Rene Vilatte (center) with Stephen Kaminski (left) and Paolo Miraglia-Gulotti (right), bishops of the American Catholic Church

By the 19th century, French-born former Catholic Jules Ferrette was allegedly ordained into the episcopacy by Ignatius Peter IV of Antioch to establish an Oriental Orthodox mission in the West. No original document has been known to exist, although Ferrette presented a purported, official English translation signed by the British consul in Damascus, Syria.

Joseph Rene Vilatte was also ordained into the episcopacy by Malankara bishops Antonio Francisco Xavier Alvares, Athanasius Paulose Kadavil, and Gregorios of Parumala. Vilatte was named "Mar Timotheos, Metropolitan of North America", with the apparent blessings of Ignatius Peter IV. There are claims that nobody has ever seen the original Syriac language form of Vilatte's credentials. According to Brandreth, no Syriac authority had authenticated the signatures depicted in a photostatic copy of a purported translation of the Syriac document; however, Iganitus Peter IV did excommunicate Vilatte as a bishop for ordaining others contrary to their canon law in 1898.

By the early 20th century, the Malankara Orthodox Syrian Church re-established the Catholicos of the East. Syriac Orthodox patriarch Ignatius Abded Mshiho II enthroned Murimattathil Paulose Ivanios as Baselios Paulose I, Catholicos of the East, on the Apostolic Throne of St. Thomas at St. Mary's Church in Niranam on 15 September 1912. The Malankara Orthodox Syrian and Jacobite Syrian Church disputed ecclesiastical authority over the Indian subcontinent.

In 1932, following controversies surrounding Ferrette and Vilatte, and clergy claiming apostolic succession through them, Ignatius Aphrem I of Antioch issued a notice which stated, amongst other things:

- "[T]o all whom it may concern that there are in the United States of America and in some countries of Europe, particularly in England, a number of schismatic bodies which have come into existence after direct expulsion from official Christian communities and have devised for themselves a common creed and a system of jurisdiction of their invention."
- "To deceive Christians of the West being a chief objective of the schismatic bodies, they take advantage of their great distance from the East, and from time to time make public statements claiming without truth to derive their origin and apostolic succession from some Apostolic Church of the East, the attractive rites and ceremonies of which they adopt and with which they claim to have relationship."
- "[W]e deny any and every relationship with these schismatic bodies [...]. Furthermore, our Church forbids any and every relationship and, above all, all intercommunion with all and any of these schismatic sects and warns the public that their statements and pretentions as above all altogether without truth."

In 1943, a group of clergy descending from Ferrette and Vilatte held the Council of London, which repudiated Aphrem's decree. These would merge into the Catholicate of the West, which by the end of 20th century became the British Orthodox Church.

==== Ethiopian autocephaly and Oriental unity ====
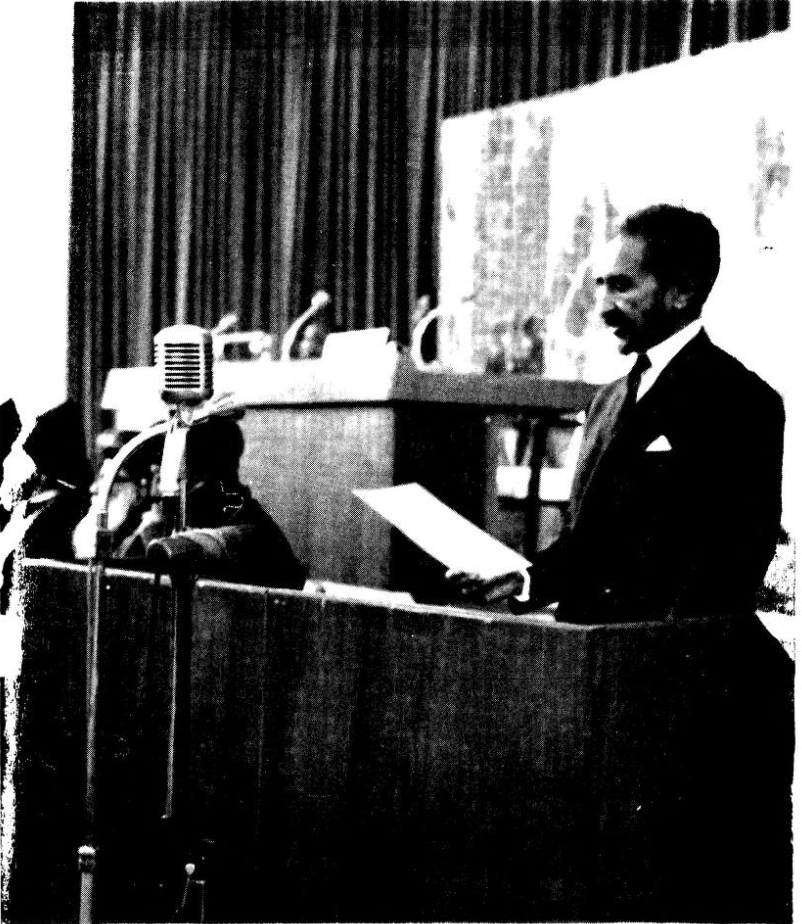
Haile Selassie of Ethiopia opening the Conference of the Heads of the Oriental Orthodox Churches at the Africa Hall, Addis Ababa

In 1959, the Ethiopian Orthodox Tewahedo Church was granted autocephaly by Coptic pope Cyril VI, and by 1965, the Addis Ababa Conference was held between the autocephalous Oriental Orthodox churches. After the Addis Ababa Conference, the Standing Conference of Oriental Orthodox Churches was established.

=== Late 20th–early 21st centuries ===
Amongst the Oriental Orthodox, ecumenical dialogue increased with other Christians in the late 20th century, and several independent sacramental churches, bishops and other clergy would be received into the Oriental Orthodox Churches.

In the 1970s, Shenouda III and the Coptic Orthodox Church received an independent sacramental bishop and their jurisdiction—Jan Frederik Nico Blom van Assendelft-Altland and the Primitive Apostolic Orthodox Church of the Syro-Byzantine Tradition—into their church. This would form the French Coptic Orthodox Church, and Altland would be reconsecrated as Marcos; he would serve until his death in 2008.

From several meetings between the authorities of the Catholic Church and Oriental Orthodoxy, reconciling declarations emerged in the common statement of Syriac patriarch Mar Ignatius Zakka I Iwas and the Roman pope John Paul II in 1984:

The confusions and schisms that occurred between their Churches in the later centuries, they realize today, in no way affect or touch the substance of their faith, since these arose only because of differences in terminology and culture and in the various formulae adopted by different theological schools to express the same matter. Accordingly, we find today no real basis for the sad divisions and schisms that subsequently arose between us concerning the doctrine of Incarnation. In words and life we confess the true doctrine concerning Christ our Lord, notwithstanding the differences in interpretation of such a doctrine which arose at the time of the Council of Chalcedon.

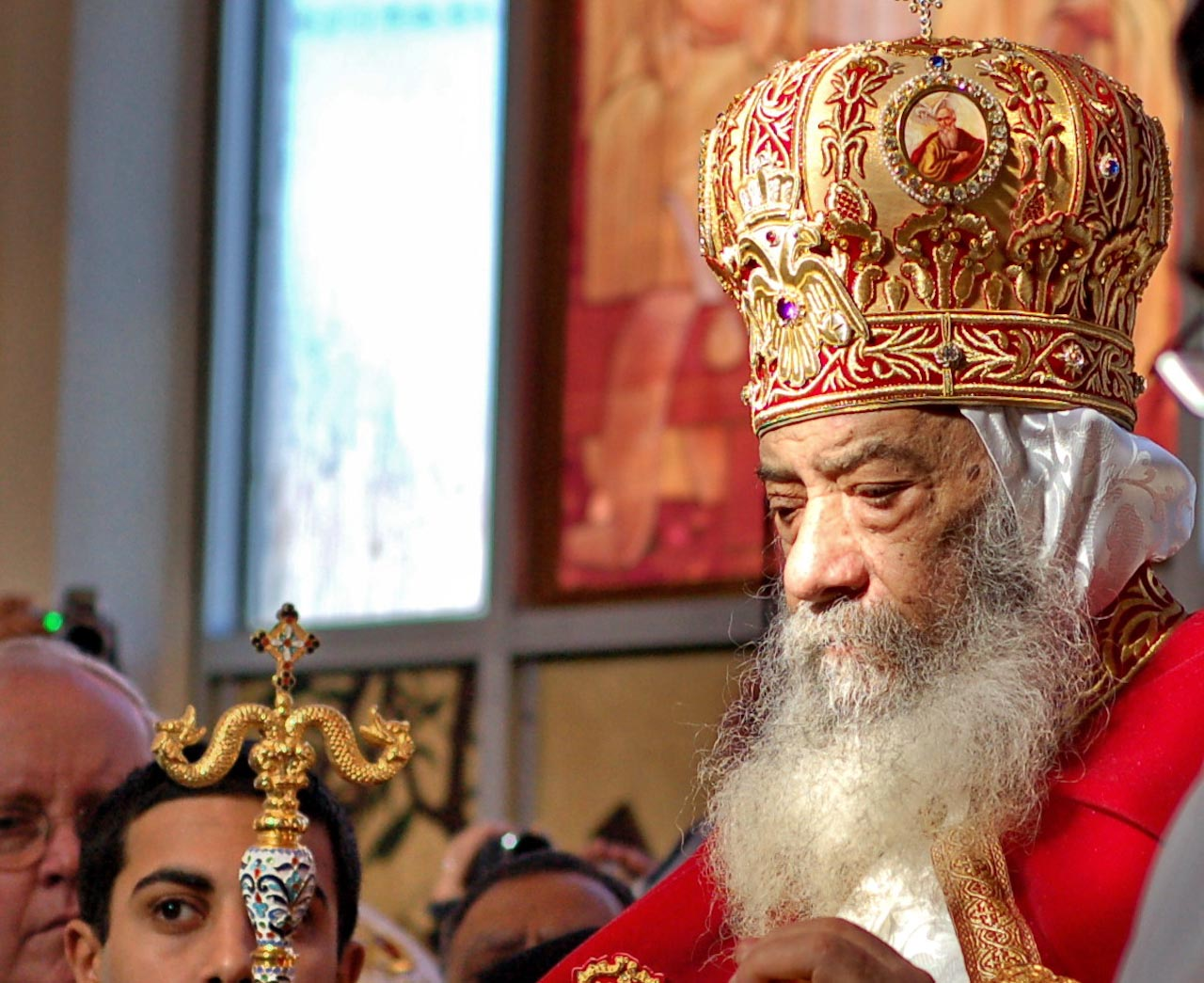
Pope Shenouda III, head of the Coptic Orthodox Church from 1971-2012

However, despite the progress made in ecumenical dialogue, many Oriental Orthodox authorities like Coptic pope Shenouda III remained skeptical about the Chalcedonian churches, continuing to view their Christology as Nestorian.

In 1986, the Copts and Romans created a common formula expressing an official Christological agreement between one another. In 1990, another Christological agreement was formulated between the Malankara Orthodox Syrians and Romans. In 1996, another common declaration was declared by the Armenians and Romans. The Oriental Orthodox have also signed similar Christological declarations with the Greek Orthodox churches of Alexandria, Antioch, and Romania; however, the remainder of mainstream Eastern Orthodoxy has either sought further clarification or rejected dialogue.

In 1993, the Eritrean Church achieved its autocephaly after independence from Ethiopia. Its autocephaly was granted by Shenouda III. A year later, the Coptic Orthodox Church would receive another independent sacramental bishop and jurisdiction—the Orthodox Church of the British Isles (formerly the Catholicate of the West, and later the British Orthodox Church). By 2015, the British Orthodox Church departed from the Coptic Church as a non-canonically recognized church.

By the first quarter of the 21st century, the Supreme Court of India ruled in favor of the Malankara Orthodox Syrian Church's legitimacy following centuries of administrative dispute amongst Malankara Christians. As of 2025, administrative disagreements continued between the two churches. These disagreements extended between the Malankara Orthodox, the Coptic Orthodox, and the Catholicate of Cilicia.

== Organization and leadership ==
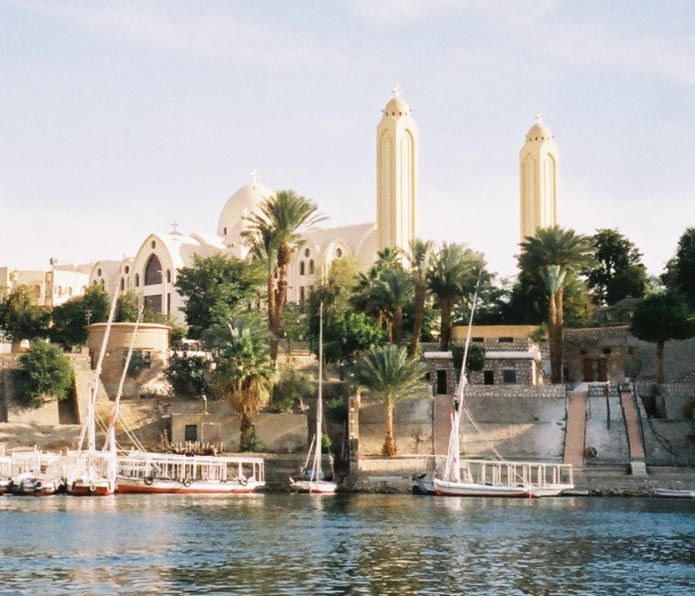
Aswan Coptic Orthodox Cathedral in Egypt

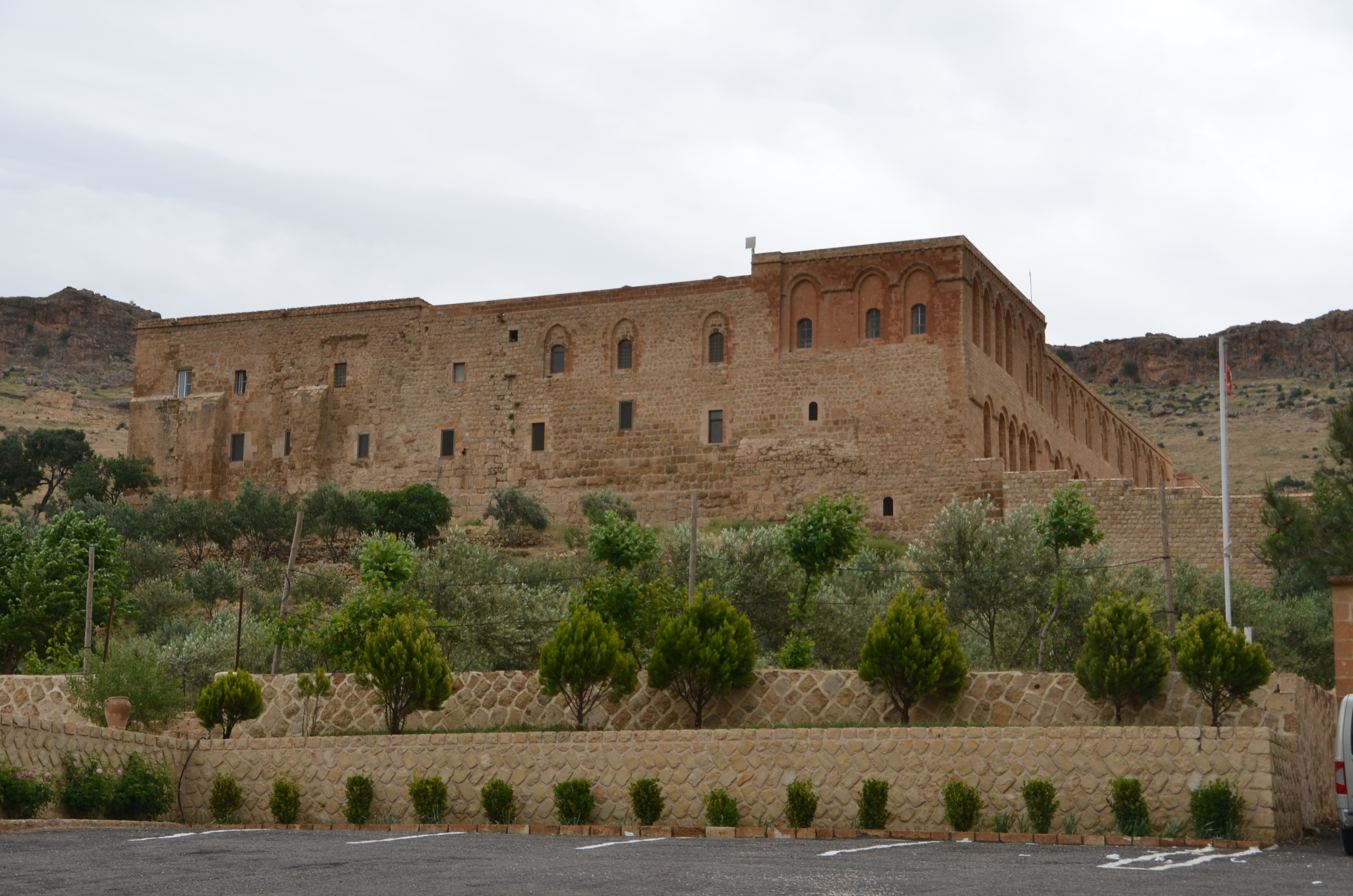
Mor Hananyo Monastery, former headquarters of the Syriac Orthodox Church until 1932

The Oriental Orthodox Churches are a communion or fellowship of six autocephalous (that is, administratively completely independent) national churches. The Oriental Orthodox Churches maintain an ancient apostolic succession and the historic episcopacy. The various churches are governed by holy synods, with a primus inter pares bishop serving as primate. The primates hold titles such as patriarch, catholicos, and pope. The Alexandrian Patriarchate, the Antiochian Patriarchate along with Patriarchate of Rome, were some of the most prominent sees of the early Christian Church, and amongst contemporary Oriental Orthodoxy.

Oriental Orthodoxy does not have a magisterial leader like the Catholic Church, nor does the communion have a leader who can convene ecumenical synods or have collective honorary primacy like the Eastern Orthodox Church. Meanwhile its ecumenical dialogues and internal church relations are led by the Standing Conference of Oriental Orthodox Churches, which acts as the permanent representative council of its member churches.

Below is a list of the six autocephalous Oriental Orthodox churches forming the mainstream body of Oriental Orthodox Christianity, and their associated liturgical ritual families. Based on the definitions, the list is in the alphabetical order, with some of their constituent autonomous churches and exarchates listed as well. Amongst the Oriental Orthodox, the Malankara Orthodox Syrian Church's autocephaly has been primarily disputed by the Syriac Orthodox Church of Antioch and its autonomous Jacobite Syrian Church of India; the Malankara Orthodox Syrian Church is not a recognized member of the Standing Conference of Oriental Orthodox Churches, the regional conference of Oriental Orthodox Churches in North America.

- Alexandrian Rite
  - Coptic Rite
    - Coptic Orthodox Church of Alexandria
      - French Coptic Orthodox Church
  - Ge'ez Rite
    - Ethiopian Orthodox Tewahedo Church
    - Eritrean Orthodox Tewahedo Church
- West Syriac Rite
    - Syriac Orthodox Church of Antioch
  - Malankara Rite
    - Malankara Orthodox Syrian Church
    - Jacobite Syrian Christian Church
- Armenian Rite
  - Armenian Apostolic Church
    - Mother See of Holy Etchmiadzin
      - Armenian Patriarchate of Constantinople
      - Armenian Patriarchate of Jerusalem
    - Holy See of Cilicia

There are a number of churches considered non-canonical, but whose members and clergy may or may not be in communion with mainstream Oriental Orthodoxy. Examples include the Malabar Independent Syrian Church, the Celtic Orthodox Church, the Orthodox Church of the Gauls, the British Orthodox Church, and the Tigrayan Orthodox Tewahedo Church. These organizations have passed in and out of official recognition, but members rarely face excommunication when recognition is ended. The primates of these churches are typically referred to as episcopi vagantes or vagantes in short.

=== Adherents ===
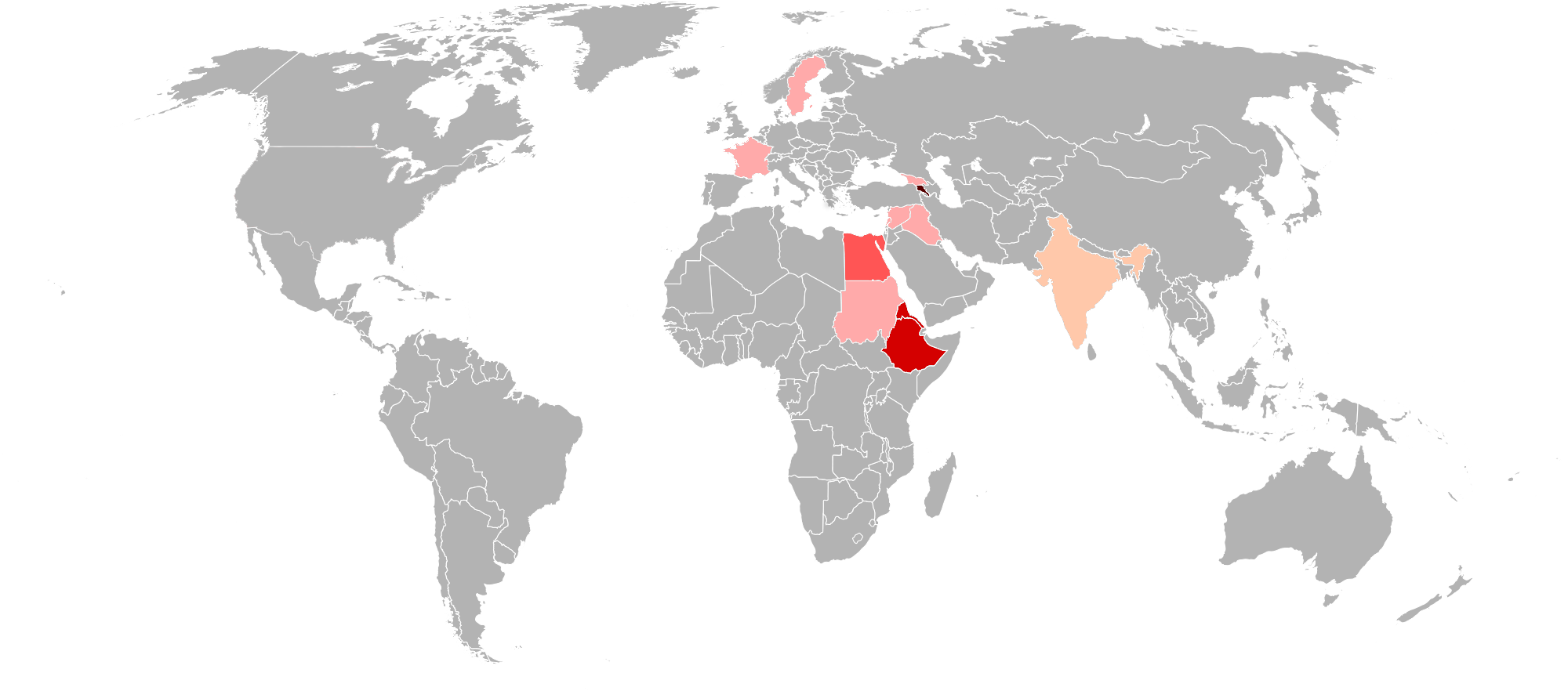
Distribution of Oriental Orthodox Christians in the world by country: Main religion (more than 75%) Main religion (50–75%) Important minority religion (20–50%) Important minority religion (5–20%) Minority religion (1–5%) Tiny minority religion (below 1%), but has local autocephaly

According to the Encyclopedia of Religion, Oriental Orthodoxy is the Christian tradition "most important in terms of the number of faithful living in the Middle East", which, along with other Eastern Christian communions, represent an autochthonous Christian presence whose origins date further back than the birth and spread of Islam in the Middle East. In 2018, Oriental Orthodox population was estimated at more than 50 million. Collectively, the Oriental Orthodox Churches claim to have approximately 87 million members.

As of 2011, it was the dominant religion in Armenia (94%) and ethnically Armenian unrecognized Nagorno-Karabakh Republic (95%). However, almost the entire Armenian population of Nagorno-Karabakh fled in 2023 after an Azerbaijani offensive retook it.

Oriental Orthodoxy is a prevailing religion in Ethiopia (43.1%), while Protestants account for 19.4% and Islam – 34.1%. It is most widespread in two regions in Ethiopia: Amhara (82%) and Tigray (96%), as well as the capital city of Addis Ababa (75%). It is also one of two major religions in Eritrea (40%).

It is a minority in Egypt (<20%), Syria (2–3% out of the 10% of total Christians), Lebanon (10% of the 40% of Christians in Lebanon or 200,000 Armenians and members of the Church of the East) and Kerala, India (7% out of the 20% of total Christians in Kerala). In terms of total number of members, the Ethiopian Church is the largest of all Oriental Orthodox churches, and is second among all Orthodox churches among Eastern and Oriental Churches (exceeded in number only by the Russian Orthodox Church).

Also of particular importance are the Armenian Patriarchate of Constantinople in Turkey and the Armenian Apostolic Church of Iran. These Oriental Orthodox churches represent the largest Christian minority in both of these predominantly Muslim countries, Turkey and Iran.

Church	Members	Self-reported	Year(s)
Armenian Apostolic Church (Etchmiadzin)	6,000,000	8,023,000	2021–2024
Armenian Apostolic Church (Holy See of Cilicia)	800,000	1,285,000	2021–2024
Coptic Orthodox Church	9,000,000	12,000,000	2021–2024
Eritrean Orthodox Tewahedo Church	3,030,000	2,000,000	2021–2024
Ethiopian Orthodox Tewahedo Church	36,000,000	60,000,000	2024
Malankara Orthodox Syrian Church	1,200,000	2,000,000	2011–2024
Syriac Orthodox Church of Antioch	1,700,000	1,430,000	2021–2024
Total(s)	57,730,000	86,738,000	

== Theology ==
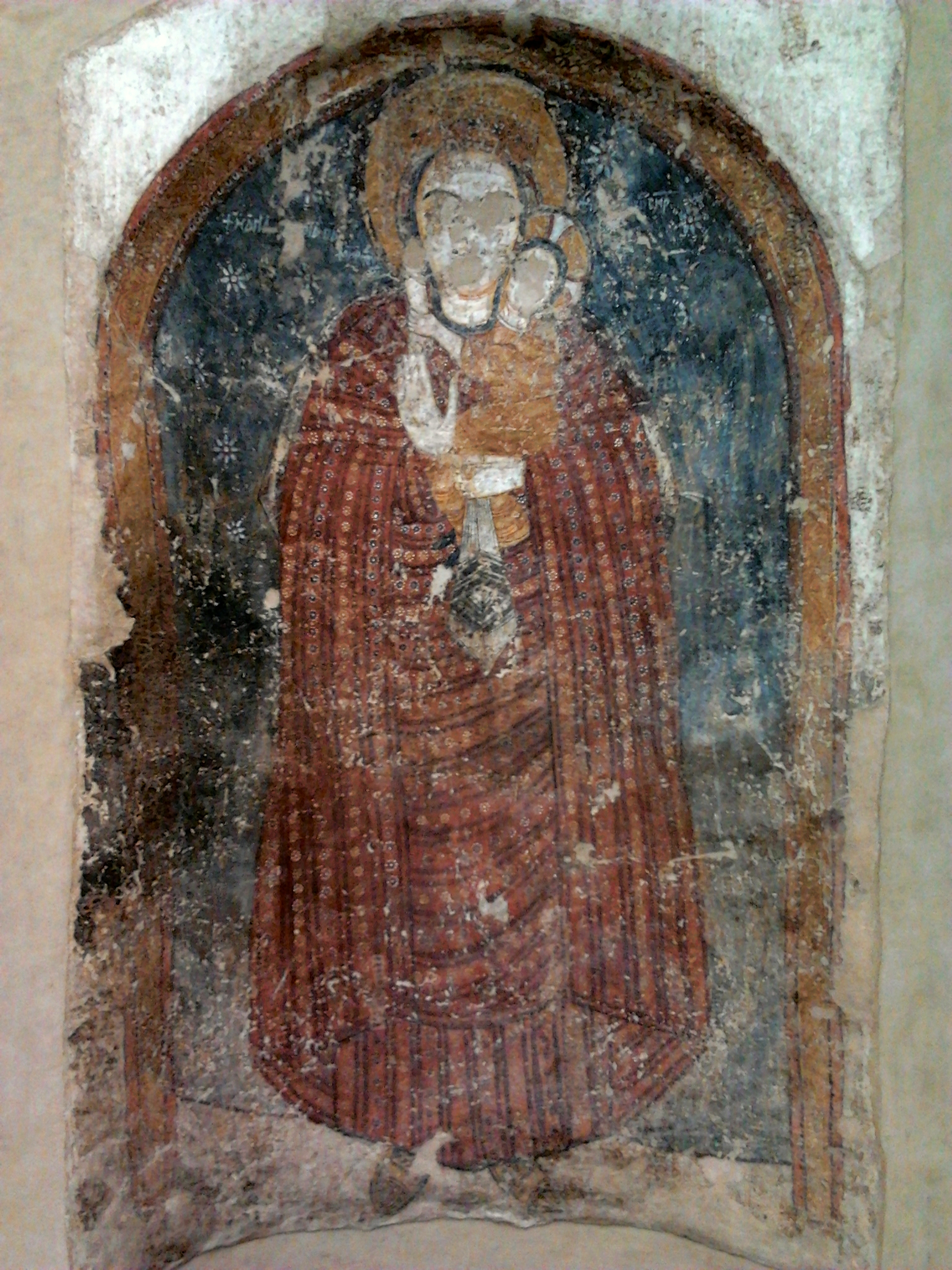
Nubian icon of Madonna and Child

The Oriental Orthodox Churches are distinguished by their recognition of only the first three ecumenical councils during the period of the state church of the Roman Empire: the First Council of Nicaea in 325, the First Council of Constantinople in 381 and the Council of Ephesus in 431.

Oriental Orthodoxy shares much theology and many ecclesiastical traditions with the Eastern Orthodox Church; these include a similar doctrine of salvation and a tradition of collegiality between bishops, as well as reverence of the Theotokos and use of the Nicene Creed. They also share the doctrine of ancestral sin and deification.

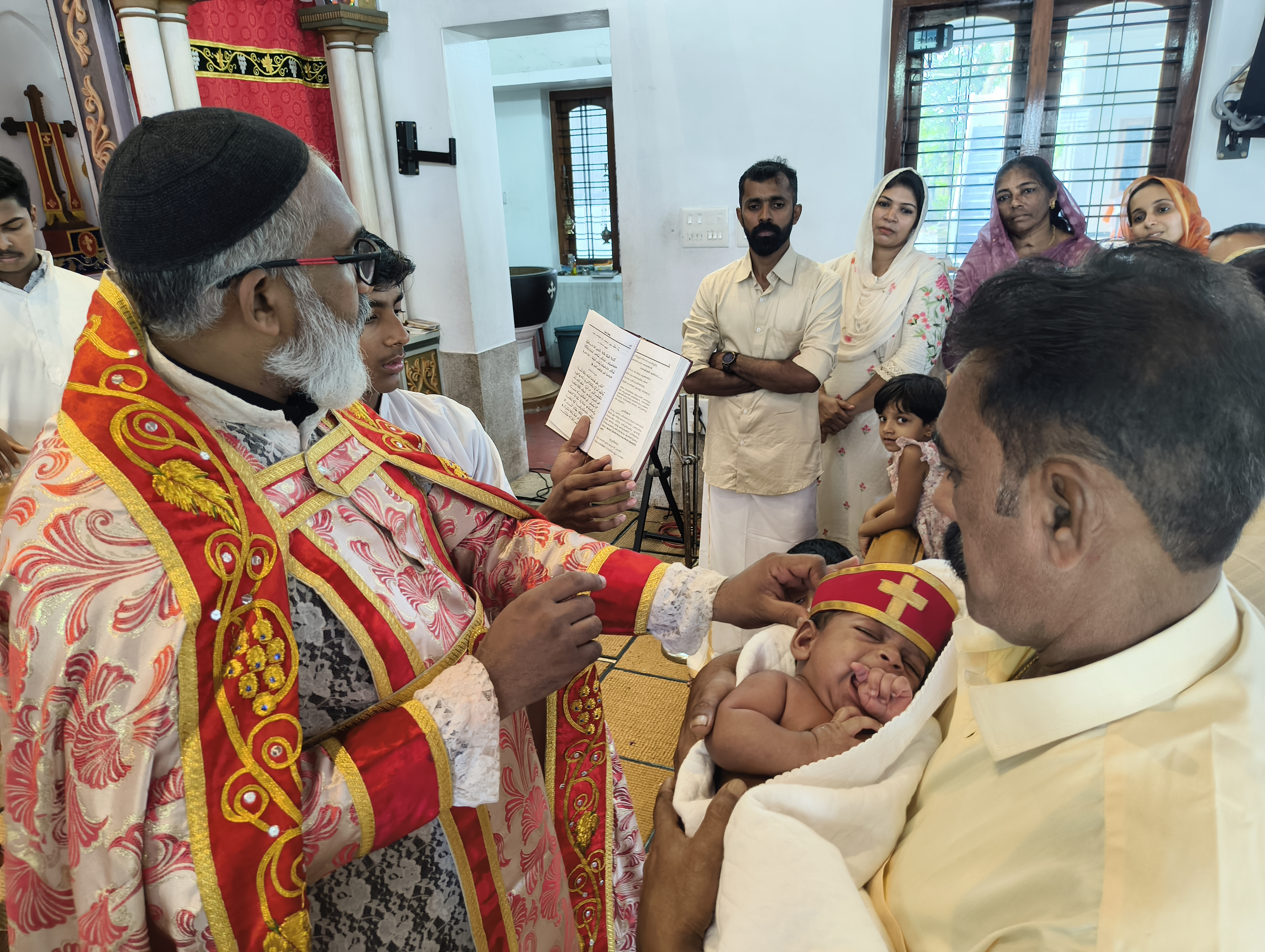
Baptism in a Syriac Orthodox church in India

The Oriental Orthodox accept the seven sacraments of baptism, chrismation, the Eucharist, penance and confession, anointing of the sick, holy orders, and marriage. In Oriental Orthodoxy, the sacraments or mysterion "can be defined as the main task of the Church in which Christ dispenses Himself to the congregation." This understanding is viewed as a combination of Augustine of Hippo and Gregory of Nyssa's teachings.

In Oriental Orthodoxy, marriage consists of a monogamous, heterosexual couple; and same-sex marriages, the ordination of LGBTQ+ individuals, and homosexual activities have been formally condemned throughout the Oriental Orthodox Churches. In the Coptic Orthodox Church, identifying with the LGBTQ+ community "is considered a sin for which a person should repent or otherwise be expelled from the community" and in 2003, a meeting was organised for all Egyptian churches to unite against LGBTQ+ rights; the Coptic Orthodox Church also practices conversion therapy.

The sacrament of baptism is performed by both immersion and sprinkling; the ordained are considered "participants in the one priesthood of Christ" and "When a man is selected to become a member of the diaconate, priesthood or bishopric, he officiates sacraments not on account of a priesthood intrinsic to him but rather as one who derives his functionality from his participation in the priesthood of Christ."

Alongside Catholicism, Anglicanism, and some Lutherans in particular, the Oriental Orthodox affirm that an indelible mark or imperishable character is received at ordination. Oriental Orthodoxy accepts baptisms and ordinations from the Catholic and Eastern Orthodox churches, and considers their understanding of sacramental character "the middle path forged by Basil the Great."

The primary theological difference between the two communions of Eastern (or Byzantine) and Oriental Orthodoxy is the differing Christology. Oriental Orthodoxy rejects the Chalcedonian Definition, and instead adopts the miaphysite formula, believing that the human and divine natures of Christ are united in one incarnate nature. Historically, the early prelates of the Oriental Orthodox Churches thought that Chalcedonianism implied a possible repudiation of the Trinity, or a concession to Nestorianism.

The break in communion between the imperial Roman and Oriental Orthodox churches did not occur suddenly, but rather gradually over two to three centuries following the Council of Chalcedon. Eventually the two communions developed separate institutions, and the Oriental Orthodox did not participate in any of the later ecumenical councils.

=== Christology ===
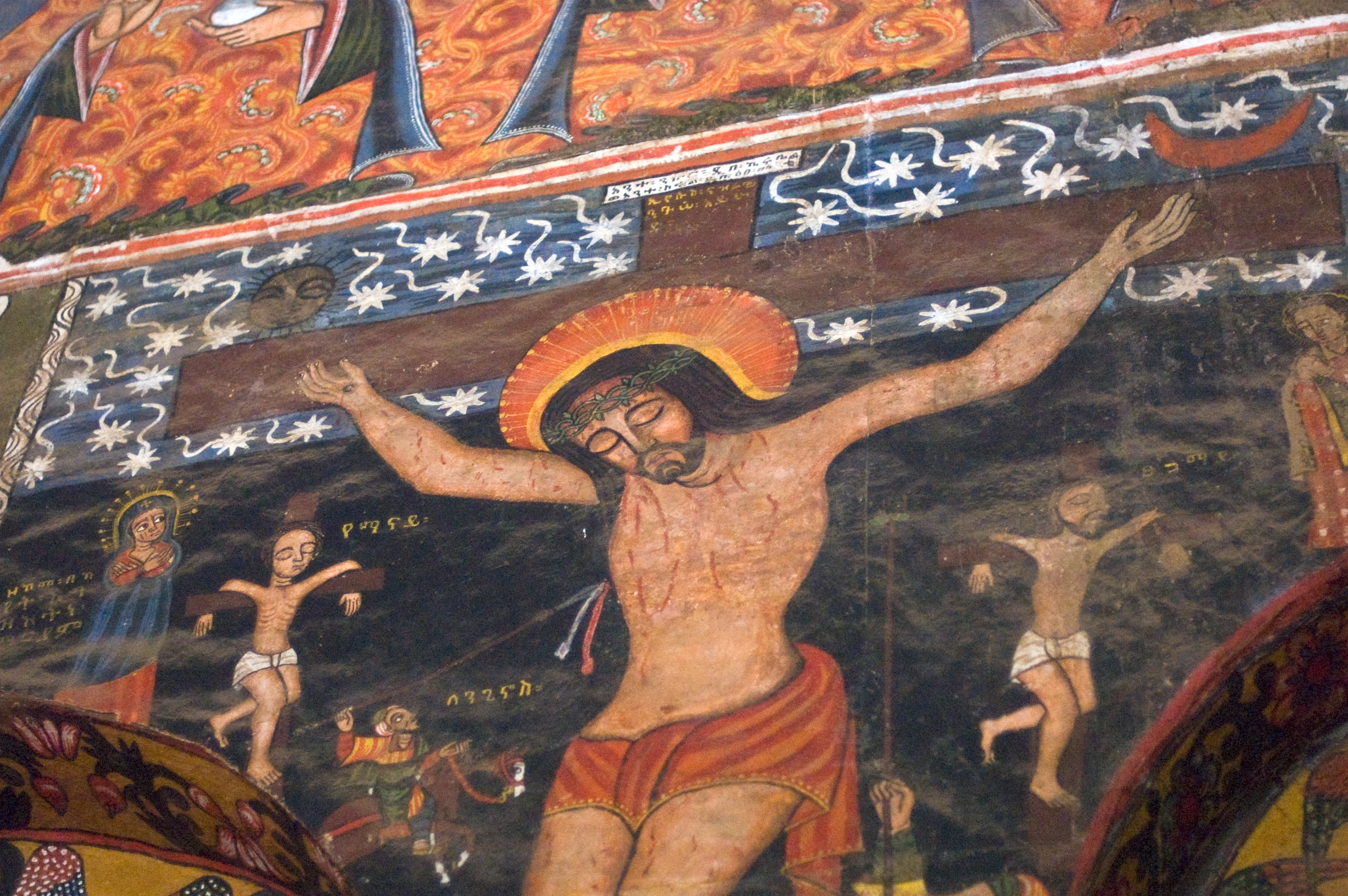
Ethiopian icon of the Crucifixion

The schism between Oriental Orthodoxy and the adherents of Chalcedonian Christianity was based on differences in Christology. The First Council of Nicaea, in 325, declared that Jesus Christ is God, that is to say, "consubstantial" with the Father. Later, the third ecumenical council, the Council of Ephesus, declared that Jesus Christ, though divine as well as human, is only one being, or person (hypostasis). Thus, the Council of Ephesus explicitly rejected Nestorianism, the Christological doctrine that Christ was two distinct persons, one divine (the Logos) and one human (Jesus), who happened to inhabit the same body.

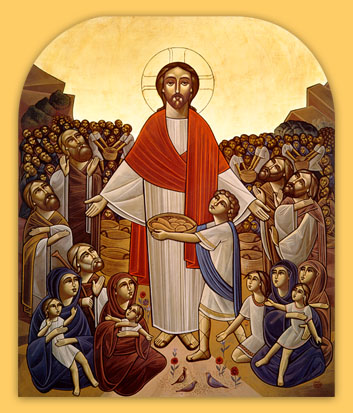
Coptic icon of Jesus

Twenty years after Ephesus, the Council of Chalcedon reaffirmed the view that Jesus Christ was a single person, but at the same time declared that this one person existed "in two complete natures", one human and one divine.

At times, Chalcedonian Christians have referred to the Oriental Orthodox as being monophysites—that is to say, accusing them of following the teachings of Eutyches (c. 380 – c. 456), who argued that Jesus Christ was not human at all, but only divine. Monophysitism was condemned as heretical alongside Nestorianism, and to accuse a church of being monophysite is to accuse it of falling into the opposite extreme from Nestorianism. However, the Oriental Orthodox themselves reject this description as inaccurate, having officially condemned the teachings of both Nestorius and Eutyches. They define themselves as miaphysite instead, holding that Christ has one nature, but this nature is both human and divine.

=== Worship ===
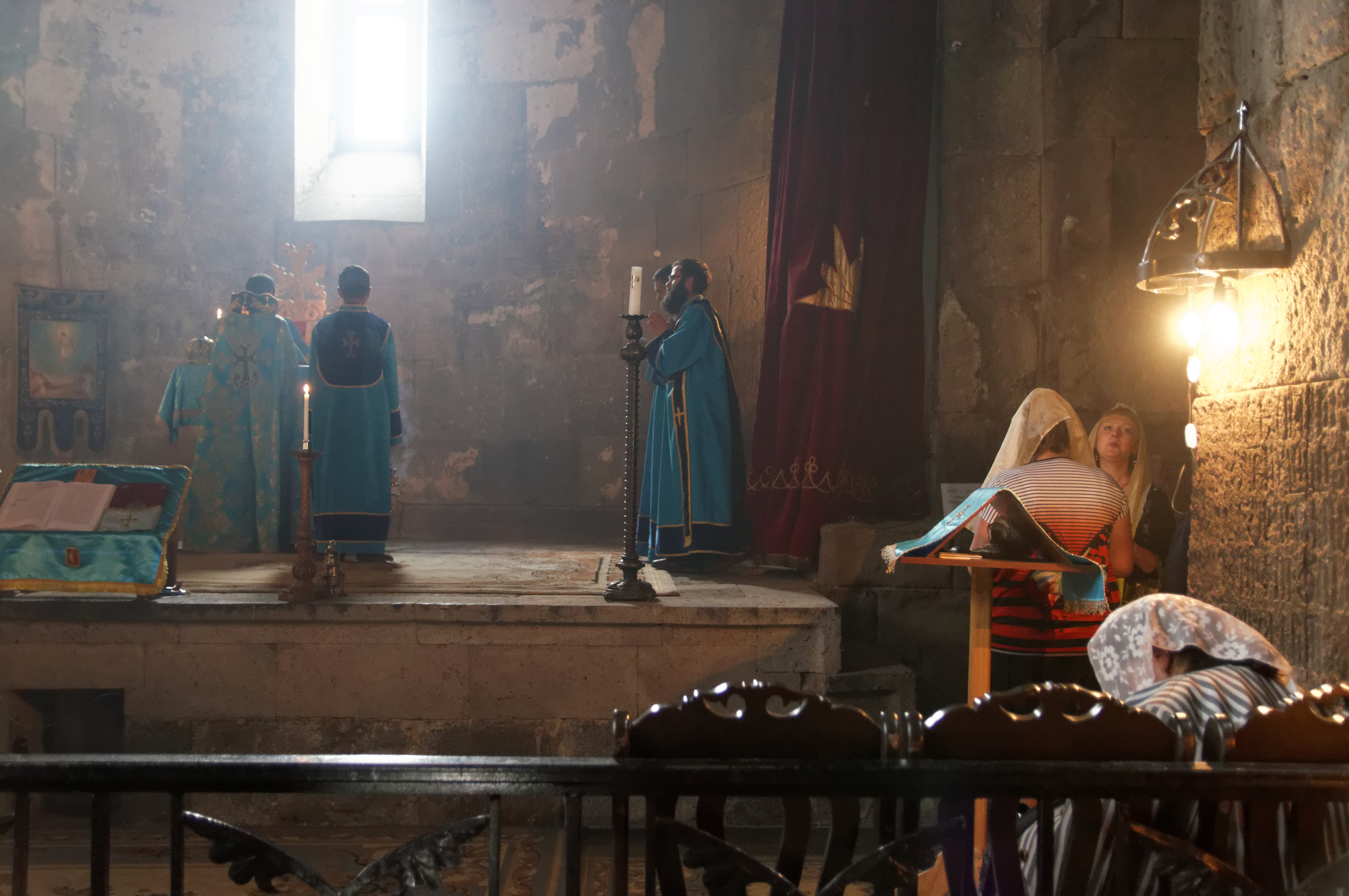
Celebration of the Armenian Rite

Oriental Orthodox Christians—such as Copts, Syrians and Indians—use a breviary such as the Agpeya and Shehimo, respectively, to pray the canonical hours seven times a day while facing in the eastward direction towards Jerusalem, in anticipation of the Second Coming of Jesus; this Christian practice has its roots in Psalm 119:164, in which the prophet David prays to God seven times a day.

Ritual purification plays a major role in worship across the autocephalous and autonomous Oriental Orthodox churches. Before praying, they wash their hands and face in order to be clean before and to present their best to God; shoes are removed in order to acknowledge that one is offering prayer before a holy God. In this Christian tradition, it is customary for women to wear a Christian headcovering when praying.

Although the Coptic, Ethiopian, and Eritrean Orthodox do not require or endorse these practices, followers of these churches commonly abstain from pork, circumcise their males, and follow other cultural practices that are close to Old Testament practices.

The Oriental Orthodox Churches also maintain differing compilations of the biblical canon including the Peshitta, Coptic and Orthodox Tewahedo canons, and the Armenian canon.

== Relationship with the Church of the East ==
The Assyrian Church of the East is sometimes incorrectly described as an Oriental Orthodox church, though its origins lie in disputes that predated the Council of Chalcedon and it follows a different Christology from Oriental Orthodoxy. The historical Church of the East was the church of Greater Iran and declared itself separate from the state church of the Roman Empire in 424–427, years before the Ecumenical Councils of Ephesus and Chalcedon. Theologically, the Church of the East was affiliated with the doctrine of Nestorianism, and thus rejected the Council of Ephesus, which declared Nestorianism heretical in 431.

== See also ==
- Interparliamentary Assembly on Orthodoxy
- List of Christian denominations
- Oriental Orthodoxy in North America

== Sources ==
- Betts, Robert B. (1978). Christians in the Arab East: A Political Study (2nd rev. ed.). Athens: Lycabettus Press. ISBN 9780804207966.
- Boutros Ghali, Mirrit (1991). "Oriental Orthodox Churches". In Atiya, Aziz Suryal (ed.). The Coptic Encyclopedia. Vol. 6. New York: Macmillan. ISBN 978-0-02-897035-6. OCLC 22808960.
- Brock, Sebastian P. (1999). "The Christology of the Church of the East in the Synods of the Fifth to Early Seventh Centuries: Preliminary Considerations and Materials". Doctrinal Diversity: Varieties of Early Christianity. New York and London: Garland Publishing. pp. 281–298. ISBN 978-0-8153-3071-4.
- Brock, Sebastian P. (2016). "Miaphysite, not Monophysite!". Cristianesimo Nella Storia. 37 (1): 45–52. ISBN 9788815261687.
- Charles, Robert H. (2007) [1916]. The Chronicle of John, Bishop of Nikiu: Translated from Zotenberg's Ethiopic Text. Merchantville, NJ: Evolution Publishing. ISBN 9781889758879.
- Davis, Leo Donald (1990). The First Seven Ecumenical Councils (325–787): Their History and Theology. Liturgical Press. ISBN 978-0-8146-5616-7.
- Fanning, William Henry Windsor (1907). "Baptism" . In Herbermann, Charles (ed.). Catholic Encyclopedia. Vol. 2. New York: Robert Appleton Company.
- Hindson, Ed; Mitchell, Dan (2013). The Popular Encyclopedia of Church History. Harvest House Publishers. ISBN 978-0-7369-4806-7.
- Keshishian, Aram (1994). "The Oriental Orthodox Churches". The Ecumenical Review. 46 (1): 103–108. doi:10.1111/j.1758-6623.1994.tb02911.x. ISSN 0013-0796.
- Kirsch, Johann Peter (1910). "Pope St. Hormisdas" . In Herbermann, Charles (ed.). Catholic Encyclopedia. Vol. 7. New York: Robert Appleton Company.
- Krikorian, Mesrob K. (2010). Christology of the Oriental Orthodox Churches: Christology in the Tradition of the Armenian Apostolic Church. Peter Lang. ISBN 9783631581216.
- Meyendorff, John (1989). Imperial unity and Christian divisions: The Church 450–680 A.D. Crestwood, NY: St. Vladimir's Seminary Press. ISBN 9780881410563.
- Ostrogorsky, George (1956). History of the Byzantine State. Oxford: Basil Blackwell.
- Winkler, Dietmar W. (1997). "Miaphysitism: A New Term for Use in the History of Dogma and in Ecumenical Theology". The Harp. 10 (3): 33–40.
