= Theorianos =

- Θεωριανός
- Born: 12th century
- Occupation: Theologian, philosopher

Theorianos (Greek: Θεωριανός, Theōrianós; Armenian: Թէորիանոս, Tʿēorianos), also known as Theorianos the Philosopher, was a 12th-century Byzantine Eastern Orthodox theologian, philosopher, and emissary. He is best known for his involvement in the discussions between the Eastern Orthodox Church and the Armenian Apostolic Church, acting as an envoy of the Byzantine Empire to Nerses IV the Gracious, the Catholicos of the Armenians. Engaging in dialogue with him on behalf of Manuel I Komnenos, he recorded their encounters in polemical and biased texts, the Disputationes cum Catholico Armeniae. Although his account of events is marked by numerous partial or prejudiced elements, it nonetheless provides valuable information, including letters.

His figure stands as a testament to the cultural and intellectual richness of Byzantium in the decades preceding the Fourth Crusade. Despite his disputes with Nerses, he is paradoxically viewed positively in Armenian sources, which depict him as having maintained a friendly relationship with the Armenian bishop and recognizing his intelligence.

== Biography ==
Theorianos' early life and background before his contact with the Armenians remain largely unknown. He was likely a notable scholar and intellectual of his time. The theologian was employed by Emperor Manuel I Komnenos as part of his religious policy, which aimed to restore union between the Imperial Church—that is, the Eastern Orthodox Church—and the Armenian Apostolic Church. After an initial fruitful exchange of letters between Manuel, the Patriarch of Constantinople, and the Armenian Catholicos, Nerses IV the Gracious, the emperor sent Theorianos and an Armenian Eastern Orthodox hegumen named John Atmanos as legates to discuss with Nerses IV the theological and practical differences that still stood in the way of union. Atmanos probably served as a translator between Armenian and Greek during these discussions. Their first journey took place in 1169, and the group arrived in Hromkla on 15 May 1170, bringing gifts from the emperor to Nerses. Their first discussion lasted about a month.

These discussions are recounted in a polemical and biased manner in the Disputationes cum Catholico Armeniae, two texts written by Theorianos on the subject. Although Theorianos preserved a number of historical documents, such as letters from Nerses and Manuel that provide insight into the period and the stakes of these religious debates and contacts, assessing the degree of authentic versus fictionalized material in these texts remains difficult, especially since they have never been studied in detail. One of the most debated points in the work is the final account of Nerses’ conversion, in which he is said to have openly embraced dyophysitism. On this matter, Stone states:

Scholarly opinion as to the veracity of Theorianos’ account in relation to the Armenian accounts is divided along lines indicated by Zekiyan. In particular, Tournebize tended to believe that Nerses actually did become a convert from the Armenian monophysite position and accepted the authority of Chalcedon, whereas the Armenian patriarch of Constantinople, Ormanian, is dismissive, thinking that the account of this first interview, as well as that of the second, are apologetic and that Theorianos only pretended to have prevailed.
Tékéyan is the most balanced, steering a middle course, but agreeing with Ormanian that Theorianos was wrong to have claimed to have converted Nerses; Ter-Mikelian insists on Nerses’ adherence to the formula μία φύσις throughout. Zekiyan takes into consideration his first profession of faith and the encyclic epistle. His suggestion is that Nerses did not so much go back on his previous Christological position, as Theorianos would have us believe, as express regret that the misunderstandings of each other’s positions was so harmful to the Church. He also argues that Nerses now recognised that the Greek, Chalcedonian, position was not Nestorian. On the face of it, Zekiyan has a good case.

In any case, after this first meeting, Theorianos returned to the Byzantine Empire with two letters from Nerses—one private, addressed to the emperor, and one public. In the public letter, the Catholicos called for union, but the Byzantines were not satisfied with its content and leaked the contents of the private letter, in which Nerses had allegedly accepted Chalcedon explicitly. This publication generated positive sentiment in Constantinople toward the Armenians, who had previously faced discrimination. Meanwhile, Theorianos and Atmanos returned to Hromkla, carrying gifts, a letter from the Patriarch of Constantinople, Michael III, in which he called for union and declared his willingness to embrace the Catholicos, as well as two letters from the emperor—one public and one private. Most notably, Theorianos brought with him the Nine Chapters, a series of nine requests from the emperor to achieve union. The Catholicos asked Theorianos whether all these demands were essential, and Theorianos agreed to reduce them to two key points: the use of leavened bread in the liturgy and the appointment of the Catholicos by the emperor. Nerses replied that he could not accept these demands without first consulting his Church in a council, but he died in 1173 before he could do so. He was succeeded by his nephew, Gregory IV the Young, who ultimately led the Council of Hromkla to its conclusion.

In addition to the two Disputationes, Theorianos was also the author of a letter opposing the use of unleavened bread in the liturgy, which was mistakenly attributed to John Chrysostom until the 19th century.

== Legacy ==
Although his texts were not translated into Armenian after his death and fell completely into oblivion, the figure of a Theorianos who was friendly with Nerses is preserved in Armenian sources. In this regard, the Synaxarion of Ter Israel, the principal medieval synaxarion of the Armenian Apostolic Church, stated about him:

Մի փիլիսոփա անունով Թէորիանոս, եկաւ տեսնելու նրան եւ երկար ժամանակ մնաց նրա մօտ։ Երբ վերադարձաւ Կոստանդնուպոլիս, երբ հարցրին, թէ Ներսէսը ինչպիսի մարդ է, ասաց․ 'Նա երկրորդ աստուածաբանն է'.
A philosopher named Theorianos came to see him and stayed with him for a long time. When he returned to Constantinople, he was asked what kind of man Nerses was; he said: 'He is a second theologian'.

In 1578, Johannes Leunclavius was the first to edit his texts, in Greek and Latin. It was not until Jacques-Paul Migne’s Patrologia Graeca in 1864 that the text was republished. Migne’s edition managed to restore a significant portion of the work, notably recovering the text corresponding to a large lacuna in the middle of the first Disputatio.

Jean Darrouzès used some parts of his texts to illustrate the literary genre of anti-Armenian polemics within Byzantine literature.

== Bibliography ==
- Darrouzès, Jean (1990), "Trois documents de la controverse gréco-arménienne", Revue des études byzantines, no. 48, Persée
- Ter Israel (1909). Le Synaxaire arménien de Ter Israel. I. Le mois de Navasard. Translated by Bayan, G. Brepols.
- Migne, Jacques-Paul (1864). Patrologiae cursus completus. Vol. 133. Paris: Garnier Fratres.
- Stone, Andrew F. (2005), "Nerses IV 'the Gracious', Manuel I Komnenos, the patriarch Michael III Anchialos and negotiations for Church union between Byzantium and the Armenian Church, 1165–1173" (PDF), Jahrbuch der Österreichischen Byzantinistik, vol. 55, pp. 191–208
- Strano, Gioacchino (2022), "Nersēs Šnorhali and Gregory IV Tłay in Dialogue with Byzantium: Some Historical Remarks", Revue des études arméniennes, pp. 191–208
