= Conference of Addis Ababa =

1965 Oriental Orthodox Churches meeting held in Addis Ababa, Ethiopia

- Date: 15–21 January 1965
- Accepted by: Oriental Orthodox Church
- Convoked by: Emperor Haile Selassie
- President: Abuna Basilios
- Attendance: The heads of all Oriental Orthodox churches
- Topics: Strengthening ties between the various Miaphysite churches
- Location: Addis Ababa, Ethiopia

The Conference of Addis Ababa was a meeting of the Oriental Orthodox Churches in Addis Ababa, Ethiopia from 15 to 21 January 1965. Hosted nominally by Abuna Basilios (head of the Ethiopian Orthodox Tewahedo Church), but effectively by Abuna Theophilos, this meeting was momentous as there had been no such collective meeting of the various non-Chalcedonian churches since the 5th century at Ephesus. The meeting was attended by Pope Cyril VI (head of the Coptic Orthodox Church of Alexandria), Mor Ignatius Ya'qub III (head of the Syriac Orthodox Church), Vazgen I (head of the Armenian Apostolic Church), Khoren I (head of the Armenian Catholicosate of Cilicia), and Mar Baselios Augen I (head of the then Orthodox Syrian Church in India which now consists of Malankara Orthodox Syrian Church and Jacobite Syrian Christian Church).

== Organization ==
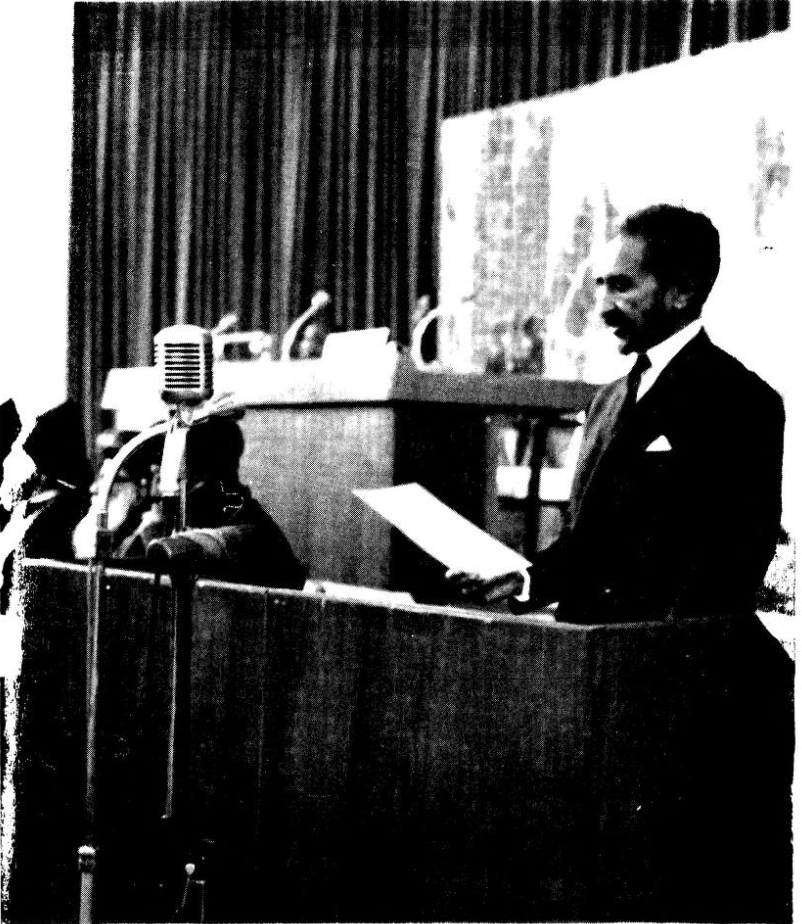
Emperor Haile Selassie of Ethiopia opening the Conference of the Heads of the Oriental Orthodox Churches at the Africa Hall, Addis Ababa

Haile Selassie, Emperor of Ethiopia, conceived of the meeting, for him a way to integrate the non-Chalcedonian churches. While Selassie initially invited representatives of both Oriental Orthodox and Eastern Orthodox churches, the invitation to the latter was rescinded, as Selassie wished the Oriental Orthodox churches to discuss communion.

== See also ==
- Monophysitism
- Miaphysitism
