= Council of Shirakavan =

- Date: 862
- Accepted by: Armenian Apostolic Church; Eastern Orthodox Church
- Previous council: Council of Manzikert
- Next council: Council of Hromkla
- Location: Shirakavan

The Council of Shirakavan (or Shirakawan) (Armenian: Շիրակավանի ժողով, romanized: Širakavani žoġov) was a union council held between the Eastern Orthodox Church, the Armenian Apostolic Church, and the Syriac Jacobite Church from April to October 862 in the Armenian city of Shirakavan. The purpose of the council was to seek unity among these three churches and to clarify the Christological positions upheld by the Armenian Apostolic Church and, to a lesser extent, by the Syriac Jacobite Church.

The council was made possible by the support of the leaders of the different churches, Photios I of Constantinople and Zacharias I of Armenia. The backing of the Bagratid King of Armenia, Ashot the Great, further strengthened the possibility of the council, which finally took place in 862. Photios later considered this council a success, but it was forgotten due to changes in political alliances and the Abbasid support for Ashot.

However, even if it was forgotten after taking place, the council is still recognized by the Armenian Apostolic Church.

== Background ==
In September 861, the Patriarch of Constantinople, Photios I, himself from Armenian origins, attempted to bring the Armenian Church into union with the Eastern Orthodox Church by addressing two letters to the Armenians: one to Catholicos Zacharias I of Tzak and another to King Ashot I of Armenia, both of whom responded. The Armenian Catholicoi had previously engaged in several attempts to reunite with the Eastern Orthodox Church.

In these letters, the Patriarch of Constantinople, Photios, argued that Zacharias descended from Thaddaeus, while Zacharias claimed that Photios descended from Andrew, thus acknowledging an apostolic origin for both sees as part of the discussion.

The search for doctrinal reconciliation with non-Chalcedonian churches was likely motivated in part by the quest for an alliance to combat the Arabs and the preparation of the military campaign that culminated in the Battle of Lalakaon in 863. The assassination of the Caliph Jafar al-Mutawakkil in 861 and the changes in the Abbasid Caliphate may have also provided more room for Christians to engage in theological debates.

== Timeline and consequences ==
=== Timeline ===
A council was convened which, after a joint liturgical celebration, brought together Zacharias and other Armenian bishops, as well as King Ashot, who favored the idea of doctrinal rapprochement between the two churches. Archbishop John of Nicaea in Thrace represented the Eastern Orthodox Church, while Deacon Nonnos of Nisibis represented the Syriac Jacobite Church, providing significant moral weight to the Aramaic-Syrian side compared to the Byzantine representation. Archbishop John of Nicaea was likely knowledgeable about Armenian customs, explaining why he was sent by Patriarch Photios.

Photios' letters served as the basis for the doctrinal discussions, and the adopted canons are considered to reflect his positions, albeit remaining relatively neutral to avoid shocking the Armenians. Photios was well aware of the prejudices directed against the Council of Chalcedon within the Armenian Apostolic Church.

=== Consequences ===
The success of the council, in the eyes of the Abbasids, reflected the authority of King Ashot, who likely aspired to unify the Christian populations in the Caucasus precisely to strengthen his position against the Muslims. Shortly after the council, he was granted the title of "Prince of Princes" by the Arab governor of Armenia, Ali Ibn Yahia.

For the Byzantines, the council was perceived as a success, and Photios wrote five years later, in 867, that the Armenians had returned to the "true faith". However, after the Abbasids strengthened the power of Ashot, Armenian diplomatic policy shifted, and a political and doctrinal alliance with the Byzantine Empire took a back seat. As a result, the achievements of this council were forgotten, especially after the death of Catholicos Zacharias and in the years leading up to 880.

Ashot's successor, Smbat I of Armenia, continued this policy of alliance with the Abbasid authorities and turned away from the agreement reached at the Council of Shirakavan. Nonetheless, the council remained acknowledged by the Armenian Apostolic Church until the 21st century.

== Decisions ==
=== Historical and theological analysis ===
The council's decisions consisted solely of canons, numbering 15 in total, with 12 of them taken from a previous union council held in Manazkert in 726.

To avoid disturbing the Armenian party, the council refrained from using overtly Chalcedonian terms, except in its canons 13 and 14. In canon 13, it condemned the Armenian Miaphysites who pretended to accept the Council of Chalcedon for personal gain. In canon 14, it addressed the Armenians who might recognize the theological arguments of the Council of Chalcedon, the Second Council of Constantinople, the Third Council of Constantinople, and the Second Council of Nicaea, yet continued to accuse these councils of being Nestorian.

Canon 14 is seen as an attempt to allow Armenians convinced of the correctness of Chalcedonian positions to be able to join this profession of faith without being condemned by the Armenian Apostolic Church. The council is also noted for its influence on the theology of Armenian art.

The theological interpretation of the council's scope varies among scholars. Jean-Pierre Mahé and T.W. Greenwood believe that the intended case was the conversion of Miaphysitism to Dyophysitism and not the other way around. However, Igor Dorfmann-Lazarev offers a more nuanced view, suggesting that the council aimed to establish a modus vivendi within the Armenian Church, which had been embroiled in significant conflicts between Chalcedonians and Miaphysites. Jean-Pierre Mahé does not deny this perspective; he sees it as a form of tolerance, albeit one favoring Byzantine positions, a view shared by T.W. Greenwood and K. Maksoudian.

=== Anathemas ===
The council documents, approved by Patriarch Photios I of Constantinople, included several anathemas, such as the following maintaining the traditional understanding of the Trinity:

"If anyone does not confess a single nature and the three hypostases of the Holy and life-giving Trinity, the uncaused Father, the Son begotten of the Father, and the Holy Spirit proceeding from their substance, uniform, equal, and common, let him be anathema."
