= Council of Hromkla =

Council of the Armenian Apostolic Church in 1178

- Date: 1178-1179
- Accepted by: Armenian Apostolic Church; Eastern Orthodox Church
- Previous council: Council of Shirakavan
- Convoked by: Nerses IV
- Location: Hromkla

The Council of Hromkla (or Hromgla) (Armenian: Հռոմկլայի ժողով, romanized: Hṙomklayi žoġov) was a council of the Armenian Apostolic Church held in Hromkla in April 1178 or at Easter 1179, with the purpose of finalizing the union with the Eastern Orthodox Church. The council was convened by the Armenian Catholicos Nerses IV the Gracious, but since he had died, it was presided over by his nephew and successor, Gregory IV the Young. Its aim was to have the Armenian Apostolic Church adopt the outcome of the discussions between Nerses IV the Gracious and the Eastern Orthodox Church, including the recognition of dyophysitism, the belief that Jesus Christ would have two natures.

Despite the opposition from certain monks and an Armenian bishop, the council adopted the propositions of Gregory IV the Young and Nerses IV the Gracious, and signed the union with the Eastern Orthodox Church. However, despite these developments, the Eastern Orthodox Church turned away from the matter and did not follow through with the council, considering the two churches not to be in union by its conclusion, notably due to the death of Manuel I Comnenus in 1180.

The council is still recognized by the Armenian Apostolic Church. In January 1999, Catholicos Karekin I wrote an article revisiting the Council of Hromkla and its contribution to the history and theology of the Armenian Apostolic Church. Additionally, Catholicos Aram I dedicated a book to the topic in 2011.

== Background ==
In 1158, the Rubenid dynasty took control of Armenian Cilicia and decided to become a vassal of the Byzantine Empire. With more open political relations, theological discussions could resume. Catholicos Gregory III Pahlavuni sent his brother and future successor, Nerses IV the Gracious, to negotiate with the Byzantines and explore the possibility of union. In 1165, Nerses met with the protostator Alexis Comnenus at Mopsuestia to discuss these matters. Gregory III Pahlavuni died and was succeeded by his younger brother, Nerses, in 1166.

Emperor Manuel I Comnenus, who had a religious education, became quickly interested in the matter and decided to ask Nerses to send the statement of faith of the Armenian Apostolic Church to Constantinople. This letter later became known as the "Exposition of the Faith of the Armenian Church". In this letter, Nerses declared that the Armenian Apostolic Church acknowledged the two natures of Jesus Christ and that the Armenian Church was not Monophysite nor Miaphysite, but that it preferred to use the Cyrillian terminology of "one nature", based on its own tradition. He also recognized dyothelism in the Exposition. Nerses also defended iconodulism and acknowledged that some Armenians were iconoclasts, but he condemned their views. The rest of the letter addressed practical organizational matters related to fasting, liturgy, and the date of Christmas, which the Armenian Apostolic Church celebrated separately.

Manuel I Comnenus was moved by Nerses' letter and proposals and suggested that Nerses came to Constantinople to continue the discussion. However, Nerses responded that it would be better for the emperor to send a representative to Hromkla, the seat of the Catholicos, to hold the discussions there. Two representatives were sent by the emperor: a theologian named Theorianos and an Eastern Orthodox Armenian hegumen named John Outman. They brought along a series of demands from the emperor, covering not only doctrinal points but also liturgical and organizational issues, which troubled Nerses due to their severity. In 1170, a discussion took place between these representatives and the Armenian bishops, including Nerses and the future Gregory IV the Young. This discussion was preserved in the Patrologia Graeca. It was then decided to organize a council in the upcoming years, and Nerses sent a synodal letter to address the issue of union to the Armenian clerics, summoning them to attend the council, even if the Rubenids were at that time independent.

After the death of Nerses IV the Gracious in 1173, his nephew succeeded him as Gregory IV the Young. In 1174, Gregory IV managed to persuade the Byzantine emperor to set aside a significant portion of the demands and focus on doctrinal questions, mainly the issue of Monophysitism or Dyophysitism. According to him, the Armenians were more committed to their own liturgical and cultural traditions than to the union, and asking for such concessions would be the surest way to thwart the union.

== Timeline and consequences ==
=== Timeline ===
Gregory IV the Young presided over the council, which took place in Hromkla in April 1178 or at Easter 1179. The Catholicos of Albania (Caucasus) and 32 bishops from Armenia, Cilicia, and the diaspora attended the council, although the bishop of Ani and the hegumens of Haghpat and Sanahin were absent, mainly due to conflicts with the Georgian Church, which made them highly hostile to the union council. In response to their accusations of Nestorianism, Gregory sent them a peaceful letter, urging them to reconsider and still come to the council, stating:

The Greeks have invited us once and twice, should we not meet them courageously and either agree with them or make them agree with us ?

At the council, Nerses of Lampron, the archbishop of Tarsus, delivered a notable speech in which he criticized the hostilities between the Eastern Orthodox Church and the Armenian Apostolic Church. He called for peace and unity, urging both churches to set aside their differences and come together in harmony.

The council accepted the union with the Eastern Orthodox Church and proposed a profession of faith embracing the dyophysite belief while adopting the Chalcedonian terminology. Additionally, the council condemned the teachings of Eutyches and Nestorius. The council also recognized officially the Council of Ancyra, the Council of Caesarea, the Council of Neocaesarea, the Council of Gangra, the Council of Antioch, the Council of Laodicea and the Council of Serdica. From that time and from that council, the Book of Revelation also entered the list of canonical books of the Bible for the Armenian Apostolic Church.

Afterwards, Gregory sent a letter to the Patriarch of Constantinople, in which he declared that:

We confess, as you do, the ineffable union of the two natures in Christ.

=== Consequences ===
Following the death of Manuel I Comnenus in 1180, the agreement signed during the Council of Hromkla was largely forgotten, especially since in 1196, the Byzantines reintroduced the liturgical demands that Manuel had previously agreed to set aside.

Despite the setback, the Council of Hromkla remains significant in the history of the Armenian Apostolic Church. In 1999, Catholicos Karekin I wrote an article reflecting on the council and its contribution to the history and theology of the Armenian Apostolic Church. Similarly, Catholicos Aram I, the Catholicos of Cilicia, dedicated a book to the topic in 2011.
