= Christodulus of Jerusalem =

Christodulus of Jerusalem may refer to:

- Christodulus I of Jerusalem, Melkite patriarch from 937 to 951
- Christodulus II of Jerusalem, Melkite patriarch from 966 to 969
