= John of Jerusalem =

John of Jerusalem may refer to:

== Monarchs ==
- John of Brienne (c. 1170–1237), King of Jerusalem
- John I of Cyprus (1259 or c. 1267–1285), King of Cyprus and Jerusalem
- John II of Cyprus (1432–1458), King of Cyprus and Jerusalem

== Religious leaders ==
- John the Baptist (died ca. 28 AD), patron saint of Jerusalem
- John I (bishop of Jerusalem), Bishop of Jerusalem
- John II (bishop of Jerusalem) (c. 387–417), Bishop of Jerusalem
- John III (bishop of Jerusalem) (516-524), Patriarch of Jerusalem
- John IV of Jerusalem (575-594), Patriarch of Jerusalem
- John V of Jerusalem (706-735), Patriarch of Jerusalem
- John VI of Jerusalem (838-842), Patriarch of Jerusalem
- John VII of Jerusalem (964-966), Patriarch of Jerusalem
- John VIII of Jerusalem (1106–1156), Patriarch of Jerusalem in exile
- John IX of Jerusalem (1156–1166), Patriarch of Jerusalem in exile
