= Anastasius of Jerusalem =

Anastasius of Jerusalem may refer to:

- Anastasius I of Jerusalem (r. 458–478)
- Anastasius II of Jerusalem (r. 681–706)
