= Cynegius =

Cynegius (Greek: Κυνήγιος, Kunegios) was a Christian counsellor of the Roman emperor Arcadius (395–408). The name Cynegius comes from the Greek text of Mark the Deacon's Life of Porphyry. In the Georgian version, he is called Ğeniḡos (from Greek Γενικός, Genikos).

According to the Greek text of the Life, Cynegius was a member of Arcadius' consistorium with the rank of clarissimus, although the expected rank for a comes consistorianus is spectabilis. The Georgian text says explicitly that he was a comes (count). He was sent by Arcadius to Gaza in 402 to close down the pagan temple known as the Marneion. This mission came at the request of a group of bishops led by Porphyry of Gaza. Cynegius was chosen for the task by the Empress Aelia Eudoxia. In his successful mission, he was assisted by both the dux and the consularis of Palaestina Prima.

Paul Peeters, the editor of the Georgian text of Mark's Life, and Raymond Van Dam argue that the name Cynegius is likely an error in the Greek text and that the authentic name is Genikos. The Georgian text is based on a Syriac original. On the basis of the Greek text, most scholars have concluded that the official who closed down the Marneion was a relative of Maternus Cynegius, perhaps his son. The elder Cynegius is known for closing temples in Egypt and Syria, leading John Matthews to see the selection of the younger Cynegius as indicating a common religious zeal. On the other hand, Van Dam and Peeters see the selection of the name Cynegius by a later editor of the Greek Life as indicating the name's association with temple closures.

If the name Cynegius is authentic, then he may be identified with the addressee of a letter of Bishop Firmus of Caesarea dated to 438. Firmus calls him a comes and the language of the letter is that between two aged friends.
