= Anastasius II =

Anastasius II or Anastasios II may refer to:

- Pope Anastasius II (died 498), pope
- Anastasius II of Antioch (550–609), patriarch of Antioch
- Anastasius II of Jerusalem, patriarch of the Greek Orthodox Patriarchate of Jerusalem in 705–706
- Anastasius II (emperor) (died 719), Byzantine emperor
