= Phanourios =

Phanourios may refer to:

- Phanourios (saint), an Eastern Orthodox saint
- Cyprus Dwarf Hippopotamus
