= Theodosius of Jerusalem =

Theodosius of Jerusalem may refer to:

- Theodosius of Jerusalem (died 457), anti-Chalcedonian bishop in 451–453
- Theodosius of Jerusalem (died 879), Chalcedonian patriarch in 864–879
