= Qays–Yaman war (793–796) =

War of the Watermelon
- Part of Qays–Yaman rivalry
Date	First outbreak: 793 CE; Second outbreak: 796 CE
Location	Jund Filastin and Jund al-Urdunn districts of Bilad al-Sham province (Abbasid Caliphate)
Result	Abbasid and Yamani victory: Destruction of Gaza, Bayt Jibrin, Ascalon, and Sariphaea

Belligerents
Mudar (Qaysi) tribal federation	Yamani tribal federation Abbasid Caliphate

Commanders and leaders
'Amir ibn 'Umara al-Murri	Ja'far ibn Yahya al-Barmaki

Casualties and losses
600 dead	800 dead (excluding Abbasid army casualties)

Between 792–793 and 796 a Qays–Yaman war (also referred to as the War of the Watermelon) took place in Palestine and Transjordan between the northern Arab tribal federation of Mudar, also called Nizar or Qays, and the southern tribal confederation of Yaman and their Abbasid allies. The conflict may have begun as early as 787/88, though specific outbreaks of the war are largely dated to 793 and 796. Some violence by Bedouin raiders in the Judean Desert also erupted in 797, though it is not clear if this was directly related to the Qaysi-Yamani conflict.

== Background ==
In the 8th century, Palestine and Transjordan were functioning as two administrative districts: Jund Filastin and Jund al-Urdunn. Jund Filastin stretched from Rafah to Lajjun, encompassing much of the coastal plain of Palestine and included Samaria and Mount Hebron, while Jund al-Urdunn consisted of the Galilee, Jabal Amil, and most of Transjordan (east of the Jordan River). Both districts were a part of the larger province of Bilad ash-Sham of the Abbasid Caliphate. The Abbasids annexed Bilad ash-Sham after defeating the Umayyad dynasty in 750. The capital of the Caliphate was subsequently moved from Damascus to Baghdad, and Palestine consequently lost its central position in the state, becoming a distant district whose affairs were not as closely monitored or regulated as they were under the Umayyads. The Abbasids were also facing difficulties suppressing rebellions throughout the Caliphate at the time of the intertribal hostilities in Palestine. Various Arab tribes populated the regions of Palestine and Transjordan and formed confederations. The Mudhar (also referred to as Qays or Nizar) faction, led by Amir ibn Umara al-Murri, represented the northern tribes, while the Yamani faction represented the southern tribes. Ibrahim ibn Salih, the governor of Bilad ash-Sham and a cousin of the caliph al-Mahdi, regularly dealt with the affairs in Jund Filastin. He and his aide, Ishaq ibn Ibrahim tended to favor the Yamani tribe in its disputes with the Mudhar.

According to an account by a Christian source from the time, the towns of Gaza, Bayt Jibrin, Ascalon in Jund Filastin and Sariphaea in Jund al-Urdunn were destroyed in 788, or during the reign of Patriarch Elias II (r. 770–797), during the hostilities between the Abbasids and a force of rebels commanded by Yahya ibn Irmiya, a Jew from Transjordan.

== War ==
=== First outbreak ===
According to 9th-century historian al-Tabari, clashes between the Arab tribes of Palestine had begun in 790/91, while 15th-century Ibn Taghribirdi wrote that the conflict began as early as 787/88. The 12th-century Syriac Orthodox patriarch, Michael the Syrian and 13th-century historian Ibn al-Athir asserted that the conflict started in 792/93. According to the latter, hostilities commenced following an incident where a member of the northern Banu al-Qayn tribe came to grind his wheat at a location in the al-Balqa region of Transjordan and stole marrows and watermelons from a southern tribesman (either from the Banu Judham or Banu Lakhm tribes). Casualties became considerable as tribes from the Golan Heights and Jund al-Urdunn joined the war as allies of the Yamani coalition. The strife was brought to an end and violence calmed down by 29 December 793, after decisive intervention by the new caliph Harun al-Rashid and his brothers.

=== Second outbreak ===
In 796, battles between the Mudhar and Yamani tribes broke out again for unspecified reasons. It is presumed by historian Moshe Gil that the northern Mudhar tribes instigated the hostilities and that the focus of their attacks was directed not only against the Yamani federation, but the Abbasid state itself. Harun al-Rashid viewed this as a rebellion and dispatched a large army headed by Ja'far ibn Yahya al-Barmaki to quell the revolt. Battles between the two sides erupted throughout Palestine, and during a major confrontation near Jerusalem, Ibn al-Athir wrote that 800 Yamani tribesmen were killed, while 600 (or 300) Mudhari tribesmen were killed. According to a 10th-century Christian source, one side suffered 80 dead and the other side, 60. According to Gil, al-Barmaki "put down the rebels with an iron hand and much blood was spilled." Al-Barmaki assigned Issa ibn al-Akki as his representative for the whole province of Bilad ash-Sham, while he appointed Salih bin Sulayman as his representative in al-Balqa. Thus, Jund al-Urdunn, which had normally been under the authority of the governor of Damascus, gained separate administration. This was a result of al-Barmaki's belief that Transjordan was the epicenter of the rebellion.

== Aftermath ==
The Abbasid governor of Jund Filastin, Harthama ibn A'yan, was reassigned to Egypt in 796. During and after the war, anarchy became widespread in Palestine. In addition, the main roads of the district were rendered impassable due to the presence of hostile Bedouin bands. Various Arab tribes that previously attempted to raid the Christian monasteries of the Judean Desert, but were prevented from doing so by the state authorities, took advantage of the security vacuum and attacked several of them. The St. Chariton Monastery was robbed and on 20 March 796 or 19 March 797, 20–28 monks at Mar Saba were reportedly suffocated to death or cremated, while around 100 monks were assaulted. The monasteries of St. Cyriacus, St. Theodosius and St. Euthymius were also raided at some point during or after the hostilities.

== See also ==
- Battle of Marj Rahit (684)
- Qays and Yaman tribes
- Qays–Yaman rivalry

== Bibliography ==
- Gil, Moshe (1997) [1983]. A History of Palestine, 634–1099. Translated by Ethel Broido. Cambridge: Cambridge University Press. ISBN 0-521-59984-9.
- Levy-Rubin, Milka; Kedar, Benjamin Z (2001). "A Spanish Source on mid-Ninth Century Mar Saba and a Neglected Sabaite Martyr". In Patrich, Joseph (ed.). The Sabaite Heritage in the Orthodox Church from the Fifth Century to the Present. Peeters Publishers. pp. 63–83. ISBN 978-90-429-0976-2.
- Levy-Rubin, Milka, ed. (2002). Continuation of the Samaritan Chronicle of Abū'l-Fatḥ Al-Sāmirī Al-Danafī. Darwin Press. ISBN 9780878501366.
- Linder, Amnon (2007). "De Plaga que facta est in Hierusalem eo quod Dominicum diem non Custodiebant: History into Fable?". In Shagrir, Iris; Ellenblum, Roni; Riley-Smith, Christopher (eds.). In Laudem Hierosolymitani: Studies in Crusades and Medieval Culture in Honour of Benjamin Z. Kedar. Ashgate Publishing Limited. pp. 3–29. ISBN 978-0-7546-6140-5.
