= Saint Porphyrius =

Saint born in Gaza during the Byzantine Empire

Saint Porphyrius of Gaza, Porphyry of Gaza
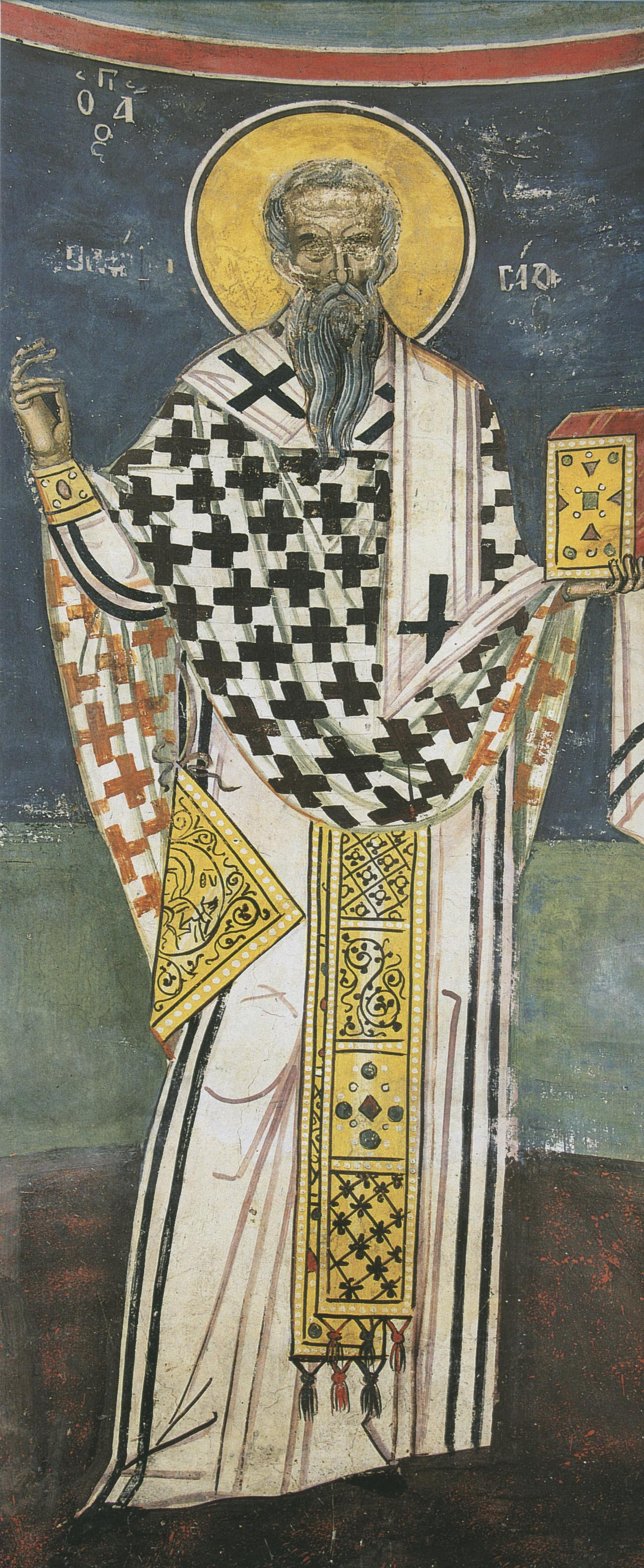
- 16th century fresco in a monastery of Mount Athos, Greece

Bishop and Confessor
- Born: c. 347; Thessalonica, Roman Empire
- Died: February 26, 420; Gaza, Eastern Roman Empire
- Venerated in: Catholic Church; Eastern Orthodox Church; Oriental Orthodox Churches
- Major shrine: Church of Saint Porphyrius in Gaza
- Feast: February 26
- Attributes: vested as a bishop with omophorion, often holding a Gospel Book, with his right hand raised in blessing

Porphyrius (Latin: Porphyrius; Ancient Greek: Πορφύριος, Porphyrios; Slavonic: Порфирий, Porfiriy; c. 347–420) was bishop of Gaza from 395 to 420, known, from the account in his Life, for Christianizing the recalcitrant pagan city of Gaza, and demolishing its temples.

Porphyrius of Gaza is known only from a vivid biography by Mark the Deacon and from a reference made by John II, Bishop of Jerusalem. The Vita Porphyrii appears to be a contemporary account of Porphyrius that chronicles in some detail the end of paganism in Gaza in the early fifth century. However, the text has been viewed by some in the 20th century as hagiography rather than history, and some elements of it are examples of the stereotyped fictional events characteristic of this literary form. On the other hand, the author was certainly intimately familiar with Gaza in late Antiquity, and his statements are of interest for reflecting 5th-century attitudes. The German librarian Lucas Holstenius wrote a biography of the subject and attempted to locate his manuscripts.

Modern psychobiographical analysis further examines Porphyry’s transition from wealth to extreme asceticism as a radical restructuring of identity, aligning with William James’s concept of the "twice-born" religious experience. His episcopate in Gaza is viewed not just as a series of religious acts, but as a strategic deployment of "charismatic authority" and "place-identity" reconstruction. By systematically destroying pagan sites like the Marneion temple and replacing them with Christian structures, Porphyry leveraged imperial power to disrupt established social narratives and anchor a new collective Christian identity within the city’s physical and symbolic landscape. This interdisciplinary perspective highlights how his personal resilience and use of symbolic capital effectively drove one of late antiquity’s most significant cultural transformations.

His body is said to be buried underneath the ruins of Saint Porphyrius' Church, in Gaza City, Palestine.

A street in Zejtun, Malta, bears the saint's name.

== Account in Vita Porphyrii ==
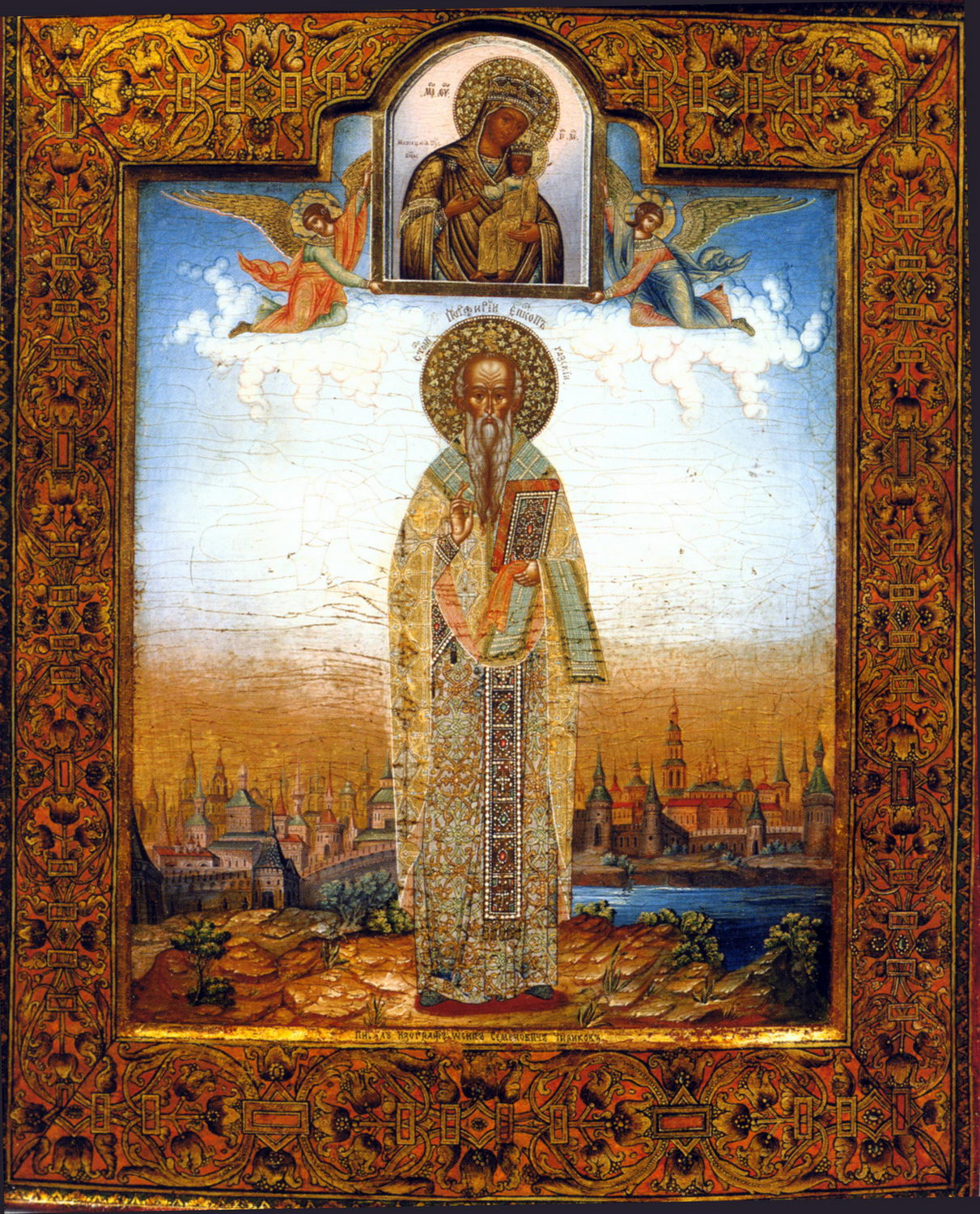
Icon of St. Porphyrius

Gaza had a history as a place hostile to the early Christians. Several had suffered martyrdom there in the persecution of Diocletian (303–313), and the brief pagan revival under Julian (362–363) had seen the burning of the Christian basilica and various Christians put to death.

The people of Gaza were so hostile to Christians that the Christian church had to be built outside the walls, at a safe distance, and the Christian bishops of the 4th century were specifically termed "bishops of the churches about Gaza". The Christian community in Gaza then scarcely numbered 280, according to the vita of Porphyrius, and the community-at-large resisted the closing of temples and destruction of pagan images which had started in more Christianized regions.

According to the vita, Porphyrius was appointed bishop at the age of 45. He arrived in the city without incident, but a drought followed the same year, and the pagans "imputed the thing to the coming of the blessed man, saying that 'It was revealed unto us by Marnas that the feet of Porphyrius bring bad luck to the city'." (Vita 19–20) Further harassment followed (Vita 21, 25) with the support of local officials.

In response, Porphyrius sent Marcus, his deacon and chronicler, to Constantinople in 398 to obtain an order to close the pagan temples of Gaza. An official named Hilarius duly arrived with soldiers to close the temples, but the Marneion remained open because Hilarius was bribed with a large sum of money (Vita 27). There was no great change, however, in the attitude of the people, who refused to allow Christians "to hold any civil office, but entreated them as naughty slaves" (Vita 32).

Porphyrius then went to Constantinople during the winter of 401–402, accompanied by the bishop of Caesarea Palaestina, and together they convinced the empress Eudoxia, who to request the emperor Arcadius for a decree for the destruction of the pagan temples at Gaza. Though Arcadius was initially reluctant, Eudoxia used her infant son Theodosius II to grant the petition when it was presented during his baptism ceremony. Cynegius, a special imperial envoy, executed the decree in May 402. Eight temples, those of Aphrodite, Hecate, the Sun, Apollo, Kore (Persephone), Tyche (Tychaion), the shrine of a hero (Heroeion), and even the Marneion, were either pulled down or burnt. "And there were also other very many idols in the houses and in the villages," Marcus relates, but the upper class who had such things had fled from the city in advance. Simultaneously soldiers, who were billeted in the vacated houses visited every house, seizing and burning the idols and private libraries as "books of magic".

The Marneion, a temple sacred to Zeus Marnas, who was the local Hellenistic incarnation of Dagon, the patron of agriculture, a god who had been worshipped in the Levant since the third millennium BCE, was set afire with pitch, sulfur and fat; it continued to burn for many days; stones of the Marneion were triumphantly reused for paving the streets. This temple had been rebuilt under the direction of Hadrian (ruled 117–138), who visited Gaza; it was first represented on the Gaza coins of Hadrian himself. To one of Hadrian's visits, also, one may conjecturally assign the foundation of the great temple of the god Marnas, which the Vita describes with a mixture of pride and abhorrence. It was believed that the 'Olympian' Emperor who founded the great temple of Zeus on the sacred mountain Gerizim of the Samaritans would not be slow to recognize the claims of the Cretan Zeus of the Gazaeans. After the suppression of a revolt of the Jews in 119 AD, Hadrian allegedly selected Gaza as the place at which to sell his Jewish captives.

Directly upon the ruins of the Marneion, at the expense of the empress, a large church called the Eudoxiana was erected in her honor and dedicated on 14 April 407. Thus with approved violence, paganism officially ceased to exist in Gaza.

== Modern assessment of the Vita Porphyrii ==
The text exists in a Greek and a Georgian recension.

Grégoire and Kugener (1930), the editors of the Vita Porphyrii, reviewed the challenges to the integrity of the work and summarized the previous scholarship. These included the lack of other attestation to major figures, including Porphyrius himself, in an otherwise well-documented period of history. But they concluded that the text had a historical basis and "that the solution of most problems is to be found in the fact that the text of the Vita transmitted to us represents a revision of the sixth century, which borrowed from the church history of Theodoret of Cyrrhus of 444, e.g. for the Proemium, and deleted in particular each mention of John II, Bishop of Jerusalem, replacing it with the name of Praylius, his successor as bishop of Jerusalem in the time of Porphyrius".

Paul Peeters (1941) published the Georgian texts and showed that they depended on a lost Syriac original that must have been written in the later fifth or the sixth century.

Head wrote, "The textual problems can be resolved if we assume that the Life of St Porphyrius was composed in two successive stages: the original notes by a contemporary and eyewitness (whom we may call 'Mark') were later, perhaps in the 450's, given their final shape and put into circulation by another author who does not appear in the text." (Head 2001:55). He adds that "the text abounds with such convincing historical detail and shows such an intimate knowledge of the region of Gaza in late antiquity, that at the very least the general storyline merits our confidence." (2001:56) But he acknowledges that Porphyrius is otherwise undocumented in the historical record, and that the text contains the "usual stereotypes" of hagiography documented by Hippolyte Delehaye.

Other scholars are more dismissive. "Richly detailed glimpses of imperial circles and great names in Constantinople are all fake; specific important people—an archbishop, a governor, and others—are all fake; and Mark and Porphyrius themselves may never have existed at all," is MacMullen's conclusion (1984:87). "The vita "comes to be routinely cited as real history by all sorts of fine scholars" writes Ramsay MacMullen in Christianizing the Roman Empire, 1984, p 86. "There is a strong temptation to use it because it is so full, specific and vivid." He concludes that "it should be possible, then, to learn about the general way things happened in well-known and recurring situations around the turn of the fourth century, even as they appear in a manifestly deceptive text" (MacMullen 1984:87).
