= Patriarch Elias III =

Patriarch Elias III may refer to:

- Elias III of Jerusalem, Patriarch of Jerusalem from about 879 to 907
- Ignatius Elias III, Syriac Orthodox Patriarch of Antioch in 1917–1932
