= Benedict I of Jerusalem =

His Most Godly Beatitude Benedict I
- Patriarch of the Holy City of Jerusalem and all Palestine, Israel, Syria, beyond the Jordan River, Cana of Galilee, and Holy Zion
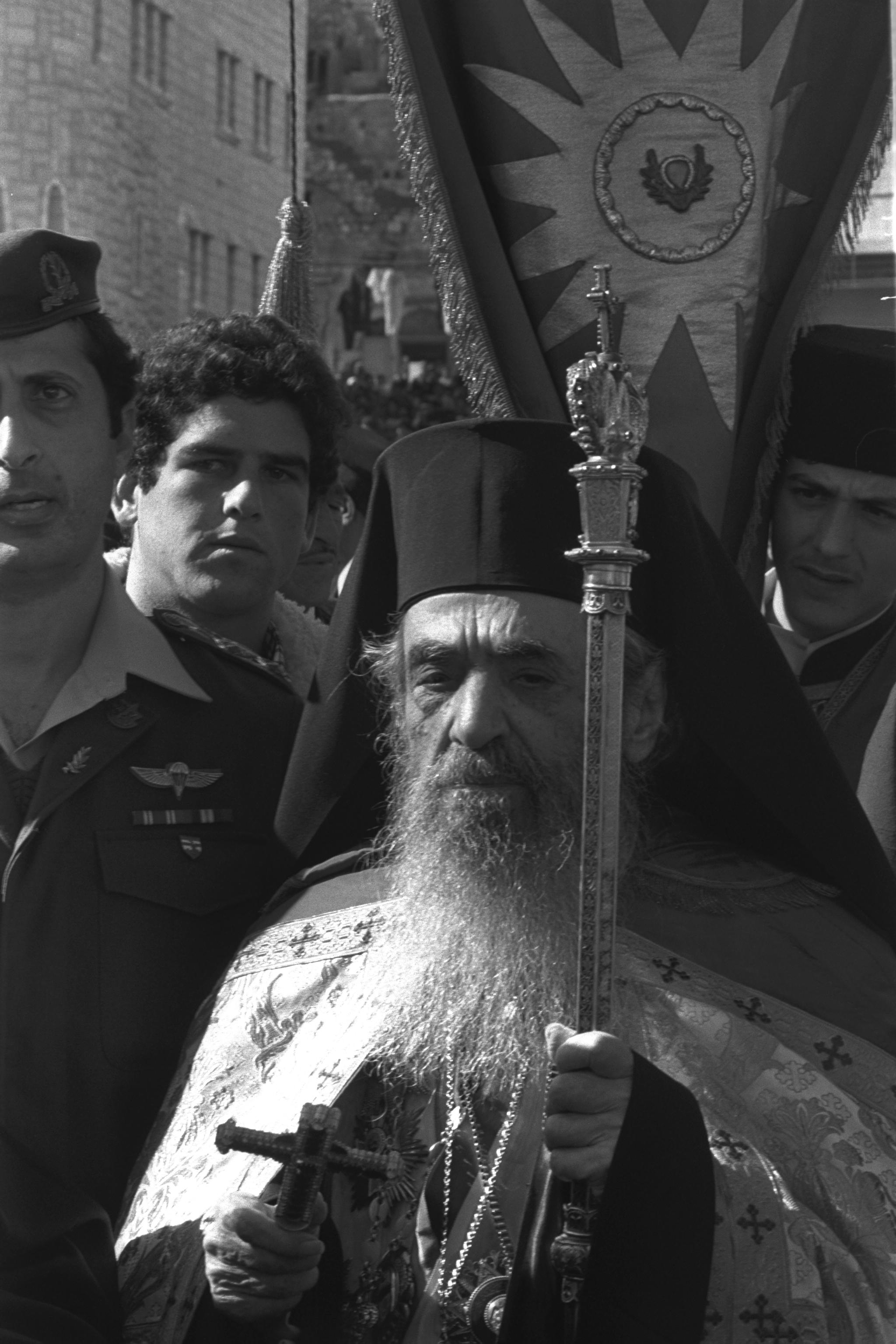
- Benedict I in 1978
- Church: Greek Orthodox Church of Jerusalem
- See: Jerusalem
- Installed: March 1, 1957
- Term ended: December 10, 1980
- Predecessor: Timotheos I
- Successor: Diodoros I

Personal details
- Born: Vasileios Papadopoulos; 1892 Cesniero, Prusa, Ottoman Empire
- Died: December 10, 1980 (aged 87–88) Hadassah Hospital, Jerusalem
- Education: University of Athens

Patriarch Benedict of Jerusalem, also Benediktos I of Jerusalem, born Vasileios Papadopoulos (Ancient Greek: Βασίλειος Παπαδόπουλος, 1892 – December 10, 1980) was the Patriarch of Jerusalem of the Greek Orthodox Church of Jerusalem from 1957 to 1980.

== Biography ==
Vasileios was born in 1892 in the village of Cesniero (Τσεσνειριω, modern Çeşnigir) in Bursa, of the Metropolis of Nicomedia, in northwestern Anatolia.

He went to Jerusalem in 1906 for his secondary education, graduating from the seminary there in 1914.

On December 3, 1914, he took monastic vows being renamed Benedict, and on the following day he was ordained deacon by Metropolitan Keladion of Ptolemaida.

After a two-month period in the patriarchal secretariat, he served during the war as deacon at Acre and then accompanied Patriarch Damianos during his exile to Damascus (1917–18). He returned for three further years to the patriarchal secretariat in Jerusalem from 1918 to 1921.

From 1921 to 1925 he studied at the University of Athens, in 1925 graduating in law, economics, politics and theology.

In 1927 he represented the Patriarchate of Jerusalem at the First World Conference on Faith and Order at Lausanne.

In February 1929 he was put in charge of the Metochion of the Holy Sepulchre in Athens. In October of the same year he was ordained priest, then advanced to the rank of Archimandrite.

Recalled to Jerusalem in 1946, he was elected a member of the Holy Synod, and given special responsibility for the patriarchate's legal and financial affairs, a field in which he displayed marked aptitude.

In 1950 he spoke as the representative of the Patriarchate of Jerusalem at the Geneva Assembly on the internationalization of the Holy City of Jerusalem. (Note: "...The question of Jerusalem was relegated to a subcommittee operating separately from the Lausanne Conference; a proposed statute for the internationalization of Jerusalem was presented to the United Nations General Assembly in fall 1950." "When the Assembly met in December 1950, neither a Swedish resolution calling for functional internationalization nor a Belgian one calling for territorial internationalization was approved and that was the end of the Assembly's consideration of the Jerusalem issue until after the June War.")

In March 1951 he was consecrated Archbishop of Tiberias in the Church of the Resurrection.

=== Patriarchate ===
On January 29, 1957, he was elected patriarch, succeeding Timotheos who had died over a year earlier. His enthronement took place on March 1, 1957.

With his election the Jordanian government approved a law establishing new regulations concerning relations between the Confraternity of the Holy Sepulchre (Brotherhood of the Sepulchre, Hagiotaphites Brotherhood) and the indigenous Arab community of the Orthodox Church. The rules gave the Arab laity a role in the financial affairs of the Patriarchate, and required that the candidates for the offices of the patriarchate be citizens of Jordan, but the changes were discontinued after negotiation between the Patriarchate and the Jordanians.

Following his election, Benedict actively pursued a rehabilitation of the Church of the Holy Sepulchre. Starting in 1961, after undertaking a North American tour to raise funds, (Note: "The presence of the Patriarch of Jerusalem, Benedictos the I, in Toronto, if only briefly, is interpreted as a sign Christian shrines in the Holy Land are no longer in any real danger of exposure to Israeli-Jordanian crossfire. His Beatitude left here today after a two-day visit on the first stop of a North American tour. His purpose is to raise $3,000,000 to restore the crumbling shrines, among them the Church of the Holy Sepulchre. Other shrines were heavily damaged in shellfire exchanges in the Israeli-Arab war in 1948...It was the first time a Greek Orthodox Patriarch has visited Canada.") the structure was completely rehabilitated, including repair of the foundations and cisterns, and restoration of the interior and exterior walls. Thousand of stones were replaced including removal of old and injection of new mortar. Columns were replaced and new capitals were added.

=== Death and burial ===
On December 10, 1980, as the rotunda dome was finished, further restoration of the church came to a halt with the death of Benedict. He died of a heart attack in Jerusalem's Hadassah Hospital, where he was recovering from a stroke he had suffered 10 days earlier. The burial took place on December 14, 1980, at the Church of the Ascension on the Mount of Olives.

A kindly and courteous man, traditionalist in his theology, Patriarch Benedict was critical of the 'ecumenist' policies of Patriarch Athenagoras of Constantinople, and in his later years was more reserved over questions of Christian unity than any other Orthodox church leader.

He was also a very educated man, being fluent in French, English and Arabic, in addition to his native Greek. For his services he was honoured with several high church and secular decorations.

Patriarch Benedict I is listed as being a Mason according to the website of the Grand Lodge of Greece, of the lodge «Αδελφοποίησις».

== Notes ==
Preceded by Timotheos I	Greek Orthodox Patriarch of Jerusalem; March 1, 1957 – December 10, 1980	Succeeded by Diodoros I
