= August 27 (Eastern Orthodox liturgics) =

Day in the Eastern Orthodox liturgical calendar

Eastern Orthodox liturgical calendar
August 26	August 27	August 28
August 27 O.S. ≍ September 9 N.S. August 27 N.S ≍ August 14 O.S.

An Eastern Orthodox cross

August 27 in Eastern Orthodox liturgical calendars is a feast day and a day of commemoration of saints and martyrs. Although some Orthodox churches use the Revised Julian Calendar and others use the traditional Julian calendar, the fixed commemorations for their respective August 27 are broadly the same, no matter which calendar is used. (Note: Despite the dates being the same, the days to which they refer typically differ by 13 days. The notation Old Style or O.S. is sometimes used to indicate a date in the traditional Julian Calendar (the "Old Calendar"). The notation New Style or N.S. indicates a date in the Revised Julian calendar (the "New Calendar").)

== Saints ==
- Saint Hosius the Confessor (Osius or Ossius), Bishop of Cordova (359)
- Saint Liberius the Confessor, Pope of Rome (366)
- Saint Arcadius, Eastern Roman Emperor (395-408) (Note: None of the Synaxaria list him as a Saint. His memory is preserved only in the 'Jerusalemitic Canonarion' (p. 105; Edition of Archimandrite Kallistos). Perhaps the Church of Jerusalem had a specific reason for ranking him among the Saints.)
- Saint Praulius, Archbishop of Jerusalem (422)
- Venerable Poemen the Great, of Egypt (450)
- Saint Sabbas, monk, of Benephali.
- Saint Poemen of Palestine (605)
- Great-martyr Phanourios the Newly-Revealed, of Rhodes. (Note: He is not listed in the Synaxaria. He was "newly-revealed", when his icon was discovered accidentally in the 14th century in Rhodes, during exacavations on the southern section of the old city wall. There, an ancient church was discovered with many destroyed icons, among which was the well preserved icon of St. Phanourios (Greek: «ὁ ἅγιος Φανῶ»). This took place during the tenure of the Metropolitan of Rhodes "Neilos II Diassorianos" (1355-1369). The saint was depicted as young soldier holding a cross in his right hand, and a lighted taper, with twelve scenes from his life shown around the border of the icon.) (Note: Name days celebrated today include: Fanourios (Φανούριος); Fanouria (Φανουρία).)
- Martyr Anthousa the New, by drowning in a well. (Note: "The same day, the martyrdom of St. Anthusa the Younger, who was made a martyr by being cast into a well for the faith of Christ.")
- Venerable Theoklitos, a Magistros from Constantinople who retired from the world and took the monastic habit, becoming an ascetic on Mt. Olympos.

== Pre-Schism Western saints ==
- Virgin-martyr Euthalia, in Leontini in Sicily (252) (Note: "At Lentini, in Sicily, St. Euthalia, virgin. Because she was a Christian she was put to the sword by her brother Sermilian, and went to her spouse.") (see also: March 2 - East)
- Martyrs Rufus and Carpophorus (Carpone), Martyrs in Capua under Diocletian (295) (Note: Rufus was a Deacon.)
- Saint Rufus of Capua, Bishop of Capua and disciple of St Apollinaris of Ravenna. (Note: "At Capua, in Campania, the birthday of St. Rufus, bishop and martyr, a patrician, who was baptized with all his family by blessed Apollinaris, disciple of St. Peter.")
- Saint Narnus, first Bishop of Bergamo in Italy. (Note: "At Bergamo, St. Narnus, who was baptized by blessed Barnabas, and consecrated by him first bishop of that city.")
- Saint Monica of Hippo (Monica of Tagaste) (387) (Note: Born in Carthage in North Africa of Christian parents, she married a pagan and had three children. Through her patience and gentleness she converted her husband and through her prayers and tears her wayward son, who became Blessed Augustine. She reposed in Ostia near Rome and her relics are preserved in Rome.) (see also: May 4 - East )
- Saint Caesarius of Arles, Bishop of Arles (543) (Note: Born in Châlon-sur-Saône in France, he became a monk at Lérins when young and then Bishop of Arles. He presided several Councils and founded a convent afterwards called after him at Arles, where his sister St Caesaria became abbess. He was zealous for decorum in liturgy and excelled as a preacher. His homilies still exist. During the distress caused by the siege of Arles in 508, he sold the treasures of his church to help the poor.)
- Saint Licerius (Lizier), Bishop of Couserans (c. 548) (Note: Born in Spain, probably in Lérida (Ilerda), he went to France and in 506 became Bishop of Couserans.)
- Saint Syagrius (Siacre), Bishop of Autun and Confessor (600)
- Saint Etherius (Alermius), Bishop of Lyon (602)
- Saint Decuman of Watchet (Dagan) (706) (Note: "DECUMAN, who is also called DECOMBE and DAGAN, belonged to a noble family in Wales; but desirous of a solitary life, forsook his home and crossed the Severn on a hurdle of reeds. He landed on the coast of Somerset, and finding a spot near Dunster which promised to satisfy his longings, established himself there. The place still bears his name, and is attached to a prebendal stall in the Cathedral of Wells, also called St. Decumans. The Saint is venerated as a Martyr, having been put to death by a murderer, in hatred of religion.") (Note: Born in Wales, he lived as a hermit at what is now St Decumans in Somerset in England, where he was martyred.)
- Saint Ebbo, Bishop of Sens (740) (Note: Born in Tonnerre, he was a monk at Saint-Pierre-le-Vif in Sens in France. He became Bishop of Sens which he saved in 725 when it was besieged by the Saracens.)
- Saint John of Pavia, Bishop of Pavia in Lombardy (813)
- Saint Agilo, Monk of St Aper in Toul in France (957) (Note: He was invited to restore monastic discipline at Sithin (Saint Bertin).)
- Saint Gebhard of Constance, Bishop of Constance in Germany (995) (Note: Bishop of Constance in Germany (979-995). In 983 he founded the monastery of Petershausen near Constance where he was buried.)
- Saint Malrubius, an hermit in Merns in Kincardineshire in Scotland, martyred by Norwegian invaders (c. 1040)

== Post-Schism Orthodox saints ==
- Hieromartyr Kuksha and St. Pimen the Faster, of the Near Caves in Kiev (after 1114)

=== New martyrs and confessors ===
- New Hieromartyrs Michael Voskresensky, Priest, (with 28 other martyrs), and Stephen Nemkov, Priest, (with 18 other martyrs), all of Nizhni-Novgorod (1918)
- New Hieromartyrs John Lebedev and John Smirnov, Priests (1937)
- New Hieromartyr Methodius (Ivanov), Abbot, of Sukovo (Moscow) (1937)
- New Hieromartyr Aleksander Tsitserov, Priest (1939)
- New Hieromartyr Vladimir Sokolov, Priest (1940)
- Saint Demetrius Kryuchkov the Confessor, Priest (1952)

== Other commemorations ==
- Baptism of the Ethiopian eunuch Djan Darada, by Saint Philip the Evangelist, in Acts 8:26-40 (1st century) (see also: January 4 and June 17)
- Uncovering of the relics (1991) of St. John Gashkevich, Archpriest, of Korma (1917)
- Reburial of the relics (2020) of St. John Domovsky, Archpriest in Rostov-on-Don, a confessor of Orthodoxy who firmly denounced the Renovationists (1930) (see also: February 24)
- Slaying of Archimandrite Symeon (Kholmogorov), spiritual writer (1937)
- Repose of Archimandrite Sergius (Ozerov) of New Valaam Monastery in Siberia (1937)
- Translation of the Relics of Saints Theognostus, Cyprian and Photius, Metropolitans of Moscow.

== Icon gallery ==
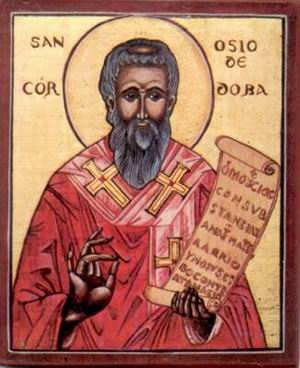
St. Hosius the Confessor, Bishop of Cordova.

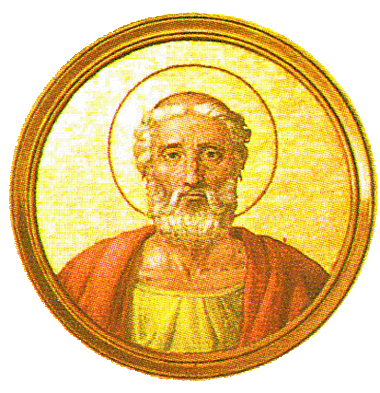
St. Liberius the Confessor, Pope of Rome.

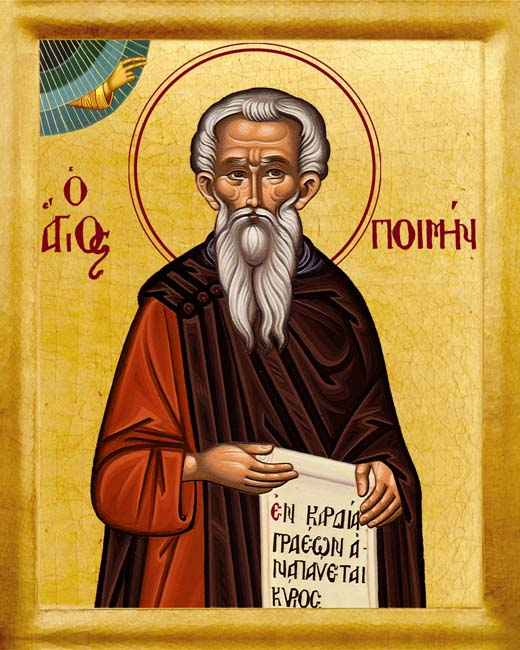
Venerable Poemen the Great, of Egypt.

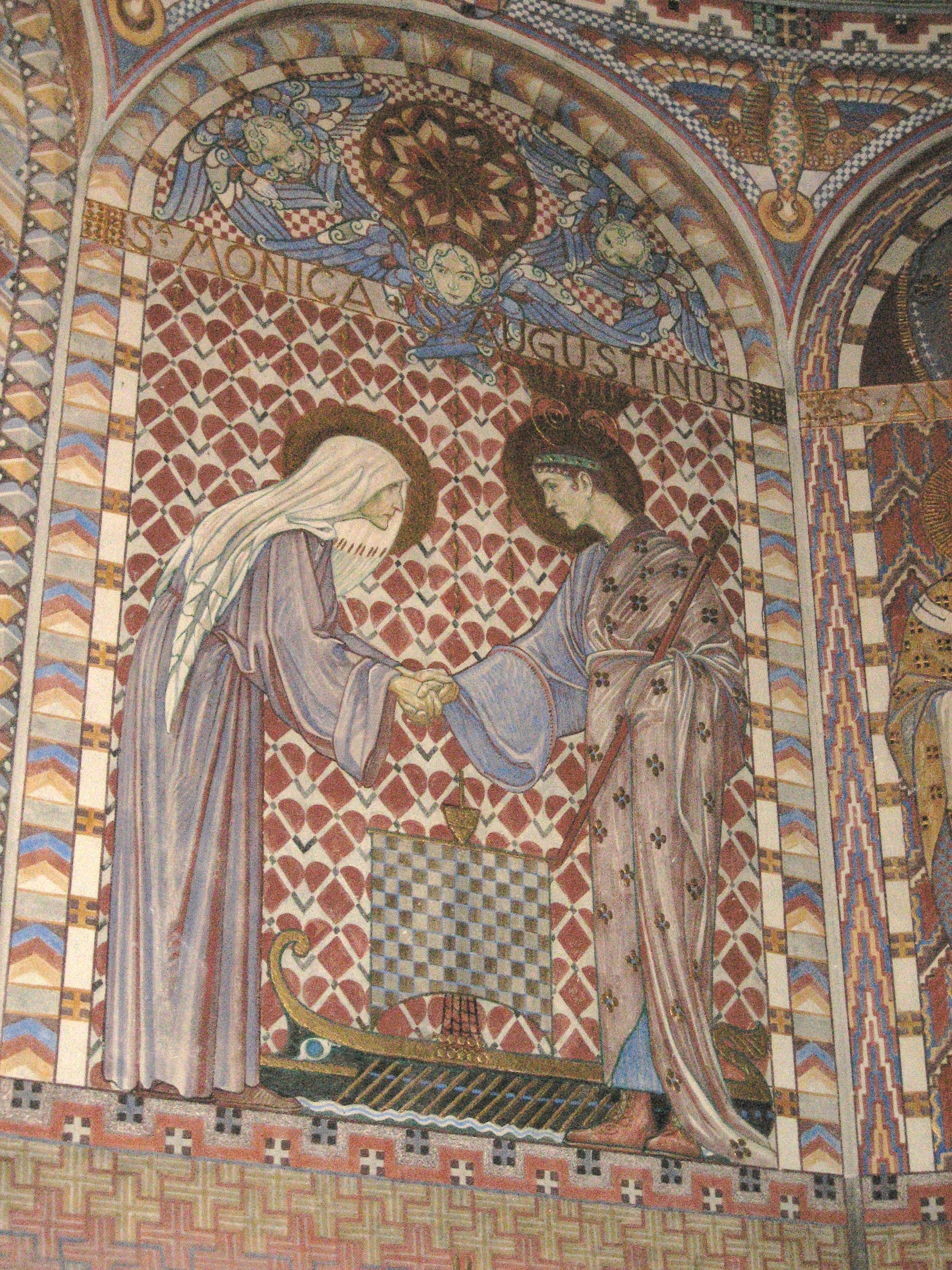
St. Monica of Hippo.

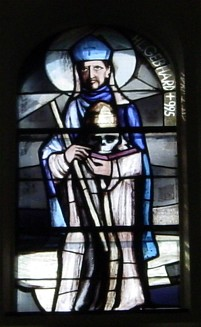
St. Gebhard of Constance.

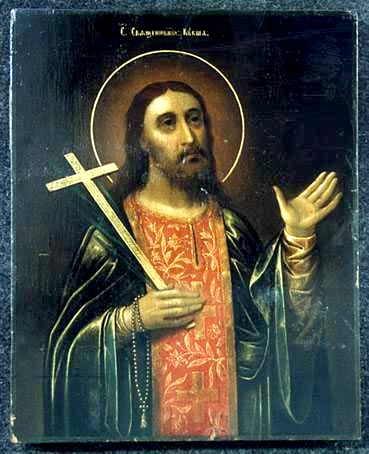
St. Kuksha of the Kiev Caves.

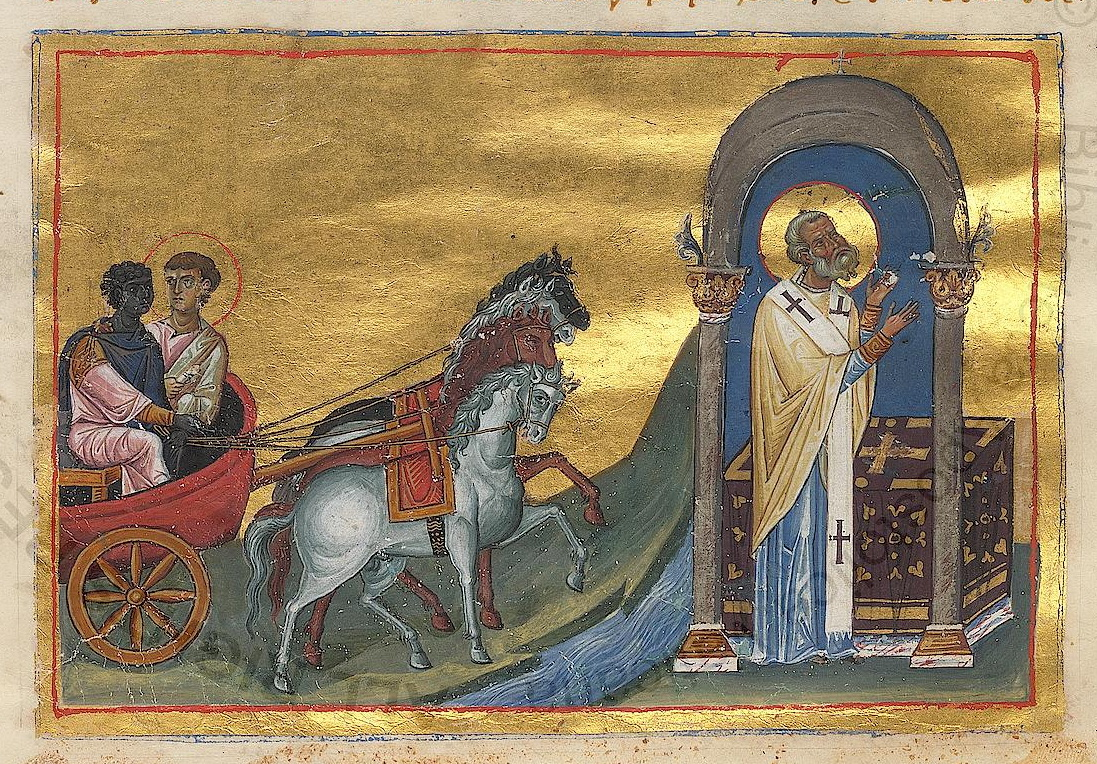
Philip and the Ethiopian eunuch.
(Menologion of Basil II, 10th century).

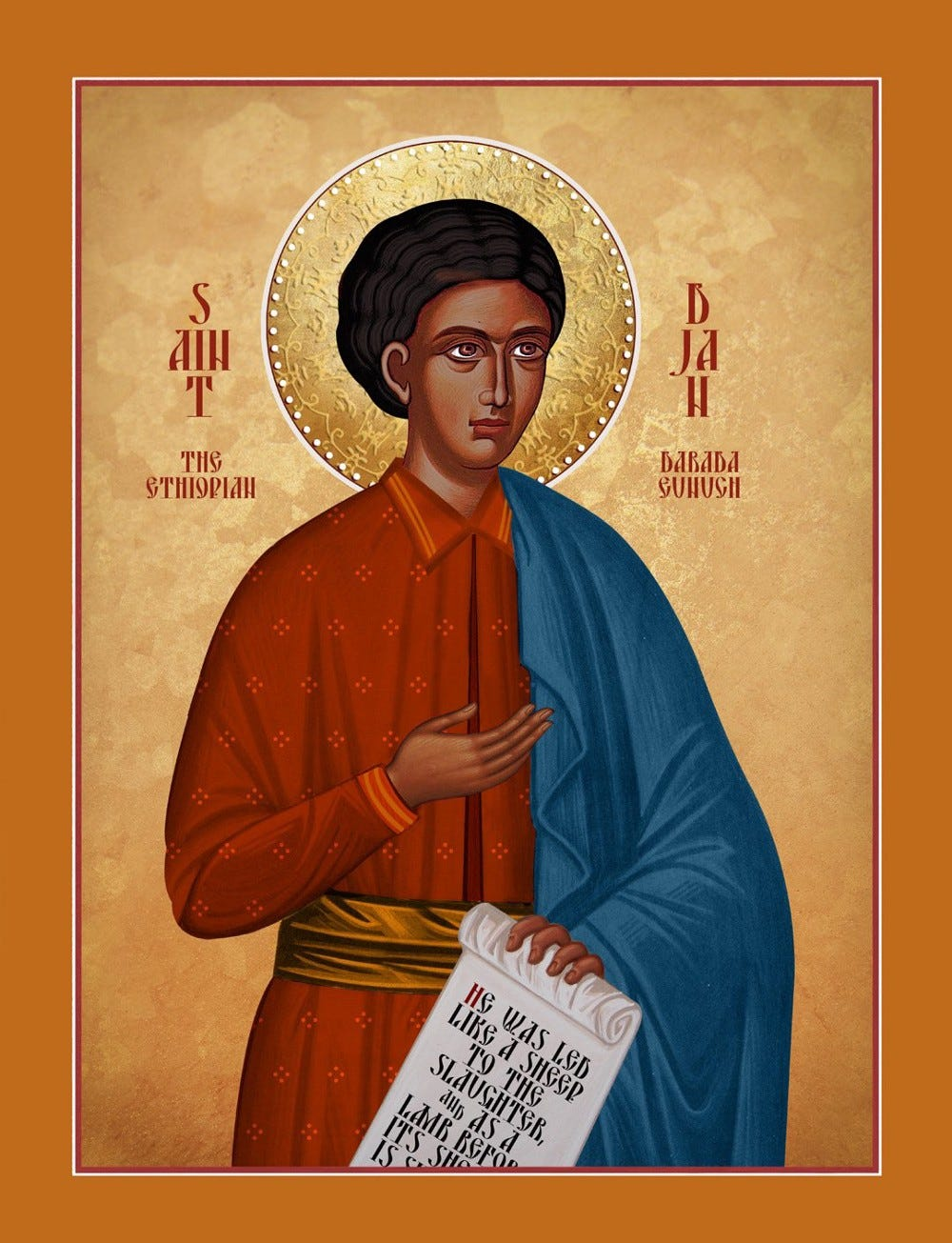
The Ethiopian eunuch, called Djan Darada, or Simeon Bakos.

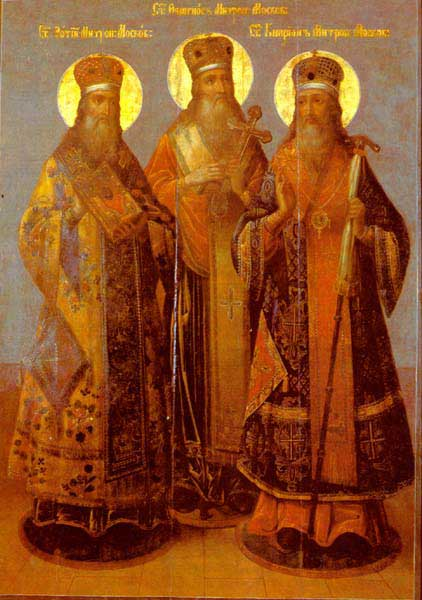
Sts. Theognostus, Cyprian and Photius, Metropolitans of Moscow.

== Sources ==
- August 27 / September 9. Orthodox Calendar (PRAVOSLAVIE.RU).
- September 9 / August 27. Holy Trinity Russian Orthodox Church (A parish of the Patriarchate of Moscow).
- August 27. OCA - The Lives of the Saints.
- The Autonomous Orthodox Metropolia of Western Europe and the Americas (ROCOR). St. Hilarion Calendar of Saints for the year of our Lord 2004. St. Hilarion Press (Austin, TX). p. 63.
- The Twenty-Seventh Day of the Month of August. Orthodoxy in China.
- August 27. Latin Saints of the Orthodox Patriarchate of Rome.
- The Roman Martyrology. Transl. by the Archbishop of Baltimore. Last Edition, According to the Copy Printed at Rome in 1914. Revised Edition, with the Imprimatur of His Eminence Cardinal Gibbons. Baltimore: John Murphy Company, 1916. pp. 259–260.
- Rev. Richard Stanton. A Menology of England and Wales, or, Brief Memorials of the Ancient British and English Saints Arranged According to the Calendar, Together with the Martyrs of the 16th and 17th Centuries. London: Burns & Oates, 1892. pp. 414–418.

Greek Sources

- Great Synaxaristes: (in Greek) 27 ΑΥΓΟΥΣΤΟΥ. ΜΕΓΑΣ ΣΥΝΑΞΑΡΙΣΤΗΣ.
- (in Greek) Συναξαριστής. 27 Αυγούστου. ECCLESIA.GR. (H ΕΚΚΛΗΣΙΑ ΤΗΣ ΕΛΛΑΔΟΣ).

Russian Sources

- (in Russian) 9 сентября (27 августа). Православная Энциклопедия под редакцией Патриарха Московского и всея Руси Кирилла (электронная версия). (Orthodox Encyclopedia - Pravenc.ru).
