= Nicodemus I =

Nicodemus I may refer to:

- Nicodemus I of Peć (died 1325), Serbian Archbishop from 1316 to 1324 and saint
- Nicodemus I of Jerusalem (1828–1910), Greek Orthodox Patriarch of Jerusalem from 1883 to 1890
