= Patriarch Leontius =

Patriarch Leontius may refer to:

- Leontius I of Jerusalem, Patriarch of Jerusalem in 911–928
- Leontius of Bulgaria, Patriarch of Bulgaria c. 918–c. 927
- Leontius of Alexandria, Greek Patriarch of Alexandria in 1052–1059
- Leontius of Constantinople, Ecumenical Patriarch of Constantinople in 1189
