= Athanasius II =

Athanasius II (Greek: Αθανάσιος Β΄) may refer to:

- Pope Athanasius II of Alexandria (died 496), Coptic Orthodox Pope
- Athanasius II, Patriarch of Antioch (r. 683–686)
- Athanasius II, Bishop-Duke of Naples (died 898)
- Athanasius II of Jerusalem (fl. 1231–1244), Greek Orthodox Patriarch
- Patriarch Athanasius II of Constantinople (r. 1450–1453)
- Athanasius II Dabbas, Melkite Greek Patriarch of Antioch (r. 1611–1619)

== See also ==
- Atanasije II Gavrilović, Serbian Patriarch (r. 1747–1752)
