= Timothy I =

Timothy I may refer to:

- Pope Timothy I of Alexandria, Pope of Alexandria & Patriarch of the See of St. Mark in 378–384
- Timothy I of Constantinople, Patriarch of Constantinople in 511–518
- Timothy I of Seleucia-Ctesiphon, Catholicos-Patriarch of the Church of the East in 780–823
- Timotheus I of Jerusalem, patriarch in 1935–1955
- The First Epistle to Timothy
