= Leontius I of Jerusalem =

Historical patriarch

Leontius I of Jerusalem, also Leo, was Patriarch of Jerusalem of the Church of Jerusalem from 911 to 928. Little is known about his activities while he was patriarch.

== Career ==
Leontius was elected to the patriarchal see in 911 after Patriarch Sergius II of Jerusalem reposed. In 923, the patriarchate was plagued by Muslim riots when they were angered by several victories by the Byzantine armies in the Arab–Byzantine wars. The rioters took special revenge on the Christians in Ashkelon and Caesarea where all the churches were destroyed. The Church eventually received permission from Caliph al-Muqtadir to rebuild the churches.

Patriarch Leontius I was succeeded as patriarch by Anastasius (or Athanasius) in 929.

Religious titles
Preceded by Sergius II	Patriarch of Jerusalem; 911-928	Succeeded by Anastasius I
