= Cyril II of Jerusalem =

His Most Godly Beatitude Cyril II
- Patriarch of Jerusalem and All Palestine
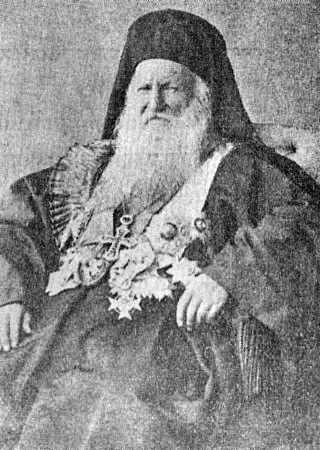
- Cyril II of Jerusalem
- Church: Greek Orthodox Church of Jerusalem
- See: Jerusalem
- Installed: 1845
- Term ended: December 12, 1872
- Predecessor: Athanasius V
- Successor: Procopius II

Personal details
- Born: Konstantinos Kritikos; 1792 Samos, Ottoman Empire
- Died: August 18, 1877 (aged 84–85)

Cyril II of Jerusalem (original name Konstantinos Kritikos, Greek: Κωνσταντίνος Κρητικός); (1792 – August 18, 1877) was a 19th-century Greek Orthodox Patriarch of Jerusalem.

== Early life and career ==
Cyril was born in 1792 in the island of Samos. In 1816 he was ordained a deacon, then a presbyter, was abbot of the monastery. In 1835 he became Archbishop of Sebasteia and in 1838 of Lydia.

== Patriarch of Jerusalem ==
In 1845 he was elected as the Greek Orthodox Patriarch of Jerusalem under the name Cyril II (1846–1872) by the Hagiotaphites (Confraternity of the Holy Sepulchre); the election was a turning point for the Church of Jerusalem, as it took back the authority to choose its own Patriarch, rather than have it dictated from Constantinople. He was a signatory to the Encyclical of the Eastern Patriarchs, a reply sent in May 1848 to Pope Pius IX's letter In Suprema Petri Apostoli Sede calling for the Eastern churches to reunite with Rome.

On February 28, 1870, Sultan Abdulaziz signed a firman which created the Bulgarian Exarchate subjected to the Ecumenical Patriarchate but yet as a representative of the Bulgarian millet in the Ottoman Empire. Cyril II participated in the Council in Constantinople, chaired by Ecumenical Patriarch Anthimus VI, in September 1872, wherein the Patriarchs of Alexandria and Antioch also participated and which on 18/30 September declared the Bulgarian Exarchate as schismatic and its adherents excommunicated. Cyril opposed the declaration of schism and declined to sign the Council's decisions. On September 14, 1872 Cyril II left the council in Constantinople by steamer to Jaffa and Jerusalem. He was dethroned from the patriarchal throne on December 12, 1872, in his absence.

Cyril II had many supporters - especially among Christian Arabs, but also among high-ranking dignitaries, many of whom suffer because of it.

== Later life and death ==
Cyril's successor on the patriarchal throne, Procopius, remained little more than two years. On February 26, 1875, mainly under the pressure of the Arab population and Orthodox clergy, he was deposed. Arab notables from Jerusalem wanted former patriarch Cyril II to be a candidate for the vacant throne, but in a pastoral message, published in the newspapers, he declined this invitation on grounds of advanced age. He died on August 18, 1877.

Preceded by Athanasius V	Greek Orthodox Patriarch of Jerusalem; 1845-1872	Succeeded by Procopius II
