= Simeon II of Jerusalem =

Greek Orthodox Patriarch of Jerusalem

Simeon II or Symeon II was a Greek Orthodox patriarch of Jerusalem in the 11th century.

Simeon was appointed patriarch in the 1080s. Pope Urban II addressed a letter to him, urging him to acknowledge papal primacy to achieve the union of the Roman Catholic and Greek Orthodox churches. Patriarch Nicholas III of Constantinople warned Simeon against accepting the pope's offer, reminding him about the Orthodox views about the Eucharist, papal primacy and the Filioque. Simeon wrote a commentary about the use of unleavened bread in the Eucharist in the Roman Catholic Church in defence of the Orthodox practise. After the Artuqids forced him into exile, he settled in Cyprus where he died around 15 July 1099, shortly before the siege of Jerusalem ended.

== Sources ==
- Charanis, Peter (1969) [1955]. "The Byzantine Empire in the Eleventh Century". In Setton, Kenneth M.; Baldwin, Marshall W. (eds.). A History of the Crusades, Volume I: The First Hundred Years. Vol. 1 (Second ed.). Madison, Milwaukee, and London: University of Wisconsin Press. pp. 177–219. ISBN 0-299-04834-9.
- Hamilton, Bernard (2016). The Latin Church in the Crusader States: The Secular Church. Routledge. ISBN 9780860780724.
- Runciman, Steven (1969) [1955]. "The First Crusade: Antioch to Ascalon". In Setton, Kenneth M.; Baldwin, Marshall W. (eds.). A History of the Crusades, Volume I: The First Hundred Years. Vol. 1 (Second ed.). Madison, Milwaukee, and London: University of Wisconsin Press. pp. 308–341. ISBN 0-299-04834-9.

Religious titles
| Preceded by Euthemius I | Patriarch of Jerusalem; 1084-1106 | Succeeded by Savvas |
