= Thomas I of Jerusalem =

Thomas I of Jerusalem, also known in Persian as Tamriq, was the Patriarch of Jerusalem of the Church of Jerusalem from 807 to 821. Patriarch Thomas held a firm Orthodox theological position and opposed both the iconoclasts and the filioque. He is considered a saint, commemorated in May 16.

== Life ==
Prior to his election as patriarch, Thomas was a deacon and had been a monk at the Monastery of St. Sabas. He also was the abbot of the Lavra of Souka and a doctor in Jerusalem. Thomas was elected patriarch after the death of Patriarch George in 807.

Following in the steps of George, Thomas continued to send delegations to the Franks, taking advantage of the treaty of friendship that had been formed by Charlemagne with the Abbasid Caliph Harun al-Rashid of Baghdad. The delegations were able to gain financial support for the Church of Jerusalem from Charlemagne that, among other projects, was used to restore the cupola of the Church of the Holy Sepulchre that had been damaged in an earthquake. Thomas also received money from Bocam, a rich Christian Egyptian.

While Thomas was patriarch, Jerusalem was infested by locusts that caused a famine and the temporary departure of the Muslims. Taking advantage of their departure, Thomas bought and imported fifteen cedars and fifteen fir trees, stripped of their branches as timber from Cyprus that were used in the restoration of the cupola of the Holy Sepulchre. When the Muslims returned they accused him of making the cupola larger than the Dome of the Rock and imprisoned him. Promising to pay a penalty of a thousand gold coins, Thomas was released and was able to keep the cupola intact. He was never able to fulfill his promise of payment before his death and his successors were held responsible for the debt.

== Religious views ==
Thomas supported the theology of the Christian faith as expressed during the Fourth Ecumenical Council in a letter to the Armenians. He also opposed Byzantine Iconoclasm and the teaching that the Holy Spirit also proceeds from the Son, the filioque, that was spreading in the Western Church.

Patriarch Thomas died in 821, and was succeeded by his follower Basil.

Religious titles
Preceded by George	Patriarch of Jerusalem; 807-821	Succeeded by Basil
