= Juvenal of Jerusalem =

Bishop of Jerusalem

Juvenal
- Bishop of Jerusalem
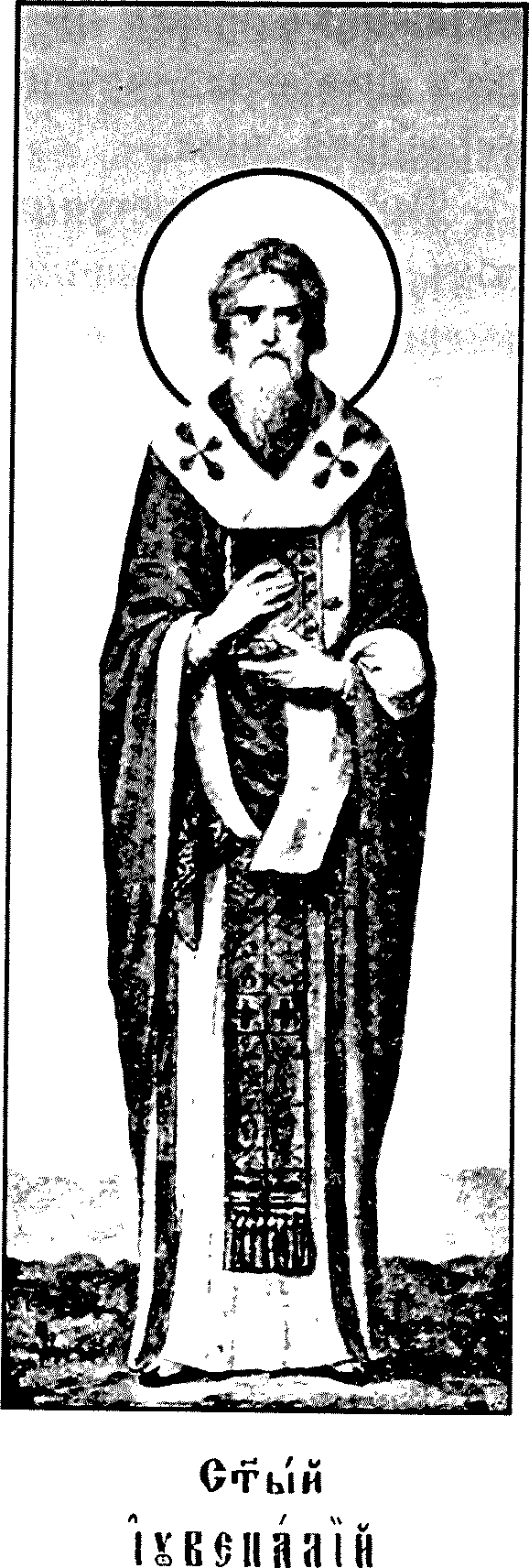
- Province: Roman Palestine
- See: Jerusalem
- Installed: 422
- Term ended: 458
- Predecessor: Praulius of Jerusalem
- Successor: Anastasius of Jerusalem

Personal details
- Denomination: Eastern Christianity

Sainthood
- Venerated in: Eastern Orthodox Church

Saint Juvenal (Greek: Άγιος Ιουβενάλιος) was Bishop of Jerusalem from 422. On the See of Jerusalem being recognised as a Metropolitinate by the Council of Chalcedon, he became the first Metropolitan of Jerusalem, an office he occupied until his death in 458. His jurisdictional reach over all three provinces of Roman Palestine would subsequently gain him the recognition as the first Patriarch of Jerusalem.

== Background ==
After the Siege of Jerusalem in AD 70 the city had been left in ruins, and after Hadrian's visit to the site in 135, a new Roman city was built, called Ælia Capitolina (Ælius was Hadrian's family nomen). Ælia was a town of little importance in the empire; the governor of the province resided at Caesarea. Caesarea became the metropolitan see; the Bishop of Ælia (Jerusalem) was merely one of its suffragans.

== Life ==
Little is known about his early life. Juvenal was born in the late 4th century and was consecrated Bishop of Jerusalem in 422. In 428/9 he consecrated the Laura of Euthymius, located on the road between Jerusalem and Jericho, and supplied it with presbyters and deacons. Euthymius and the monks of Palestine would go on to play an important role in the Chalcedonian controversy.

In 431, Juvenal sided with Cyril against Nestorius at the First Council of Ephesus. After the council he began to exert jurisdictional oversight across all three provinces of Roman Palestine; Juvenal wanted to make Jerusalem into a Metropolitan See but Cyril of Alexandria and Pope Leo I opposed the separation of Jerusalem from Cæsarea and Antioch.

Juvenal was one of the leaders of the Second Council of Ephesus in 449, being the first to sign it as an ally of Dioscorus. This led to his name being removed from the diptychs of the churches that rejected the council. However he changed his stance at the Council of Chalcedon convened later, condemning the previous council. In 451, the Fourth Ecumenical Council met in the city of Chalcedon and condemned the Monophysite heresy, which taught that the human nature in Christ was totally absorbed by the divine nature. Juvenal was among those who condemned the heresy and affirmed the doctrine of the union of two natures in Jesus Christ, the divine and the human, without separation and without mixture. When Dioscorus of Alexandria was tried for violation of canonical law, Juvenal did not hesitate to withdraw support for the Archbishop. Whereas Juvenal had previously hoped to extend Jerusalem's jurisdiction to include Roman Arabia and Phoenicia, negotiations with Archbishop Maximus of Antioch at Chalcedon resulted in approval of oversight over all of Palestine but no further. The attendees of the council, which included the bishops of Palestine, thus consented to the establishment of the Metropolitinate of Jerusalem, but this led to a revolt by a large portion of the monks of Palestine led by Theodosius. When Juvenal tried to return to his throne, the anti-Chaledonians drove him from it and installed Theodosius as the Archbishop. Although he retained the support of Euthymius among many others, Juvenal fled to Constantinople in August of 453.

Theodosius reportedly filled Jerusalem with blood, then raised a military company to punish other rivals in the region like Severianus, Bishop of Scythopolis, whom he brutally executed in 452 or 453. Imperial troops restored Juvenal in 453, and he served in peace until his death in 458.

== Theological contribution ==
Juvenal likely had monastic roots as he attended a monastery in the Kedron valley and was known for his strong support of Palestinian monasticism; many of the men he ordained to the ranks of the clergy were local monks. He also did much to promote liturgical development in Jerusalem and its environs; it was during his episcopate that the Feast of the Theotokos on 15 August was introduced and churches dedicated to Mary began to be built in the province.

As bishop, Juvenal's main concern was to protect and extend the rights of his See. The extent of the oversight granted to the jurisdiction at Chalcedon was both a significant expansion on the precedent established at Nicea and was supra-Metropolitan in scale. In light of this, a century later Emperor Justinian would recognise Jerusalem as one of five Patriarchates.

== Canonisation ==
Juvenal is regarded as a saint in the Eastern Orthodox Church with his feast day celebrated on July 2.

Preceded by Praulius	Bishop of Jerusalem; 422–451	Succeeded by Himself as the first Patriarch

Religious titles
Preceded by None (first Patriarch of Jerusalem)	Patriarch of Jerusalem; 451-458	Succeeded by Anastasius
