= Hierotheus of Jerusalem =

Greek Orthodox Patriarch of Jerusalem

His Most Godly Beatitude Hierotheus
- Patriarch of Jerusalem and All Palestine
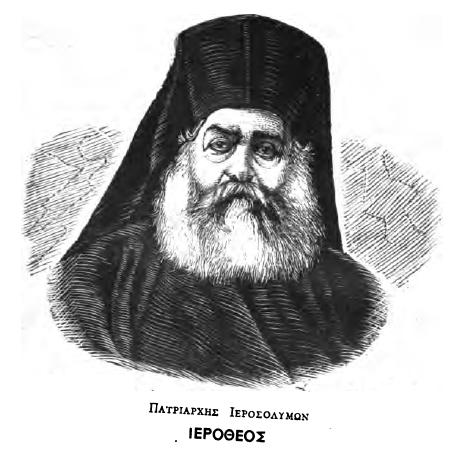
- 1882 depiction of Hierotheus
- Church: Greek Orthodox Church of Jerusalem
- See: Jerusalem
- Installed: 1875
- Term ended: 1882
- Predecessor: Procopius II
- Successor: Nicodemus I

Personal details
- Died: 1882
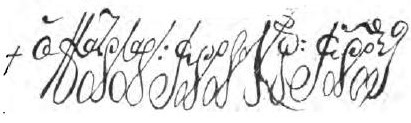
- Signature

Hierotheus (died 1882) was Greek Orthodox Patriarch of Jerusalem (1875–1882).

Preceded by Procopius II	Greek Orthodox Patriarch of Jerusalem; 1875–1882	Succeeded by Nicodemus I
