= Macarius II of Jerusalem =

Macarius II of Jerusalem was the Patriarch of Jerusalem for two periods from 544 to 552 and from 564 to 574. He was patriarch during the era of the Christological disputes in the latter part of the reign of emperor Justinian.

The early life of Macarius is unknown. Upon the death of Patr. Peter in 544, the Origenist monks of Jerusalem installed Macarius as patriarch of Jerusalem. However, emperor Justinian, who was staunchly Orthodox, favored Eustochius, the Oeconomus of the Church of Alexandria. In 552, Justinian finally dethroned Macarius and appointed Eustochius to replace him.

After a tumultuous time as patriarch against the Origenists and Monophysites, Eustochius was deposed in 564 and Macarius returned to the patriarchal throne. While he was suspected of Origenism by many people, Macarius made the point of condemning it before his second election.

Macarius died in 574.

Religious titles
Preceded by Peter	Patriarch of Jerusalem; 552 and 564-575	Succeeded by Eustochius
