= Polycarpus of Jerusalem =

Greek Orthodox Patriarch of Jerusalem

Polycarpus (died 1827) was Greek Orthodox Patriarch of Jerusalem (November 22, 1808 – January 15, 1827).

Preceded by Athemus	Greek Orthodox Patriarch of Jerusalem; 1808–1827	Succeeded by Athanasius V
