= Eustochius of Jerusalem =

Eustochius of Jerusalem was the patriarch of Jerusalem from 552 to 564. He was patriarch during the time of the Christological disputes during the reign of emperor Justinian I.

After the death of Patr. Peter of Jerusalem in 544, a group of Origenist monks in Jerusalem elected Marcarius II, an Origenist, the Patriarch of Jerusalem. However, emperor Justinian I, who was staunchly Orthodox, favored Eustochius, who was Oeconomus of the Church of Alexandria although he lived in Constantinople. In 552, Justinian ordered Macarius dethroned and appointed Eustochius to replace him.

At the Fifth Ecumenical Council of 553 in Constantinople, Eustochius did not attend but was represented by three legates: Bishops Stephanus of Raphia, Georgius of Tiberias, and Damasus of Sozusa or Sozytana [1]. At the council, not only were the "Three Chapters" associated with Monophysitism condemned, but also Origenism. Eustochius then called later in 553 a local council in Jerusalem during which all the bishops of Palestine, except for Alexander of Abila, confirmed the Fifth Council's verdicts. Yet, despite these efforts by Eustochius, opposition rose against the verdicts of the Constantinople Council among the monasteries, opposition led by the monks of the New Lavra (near Teqoa), one of the monasteries founded by St. Sabbas.

In 555, Eustochius, in a forceful effort, that was aided by dux Anastasius, assaulted the Lavra, drove some sixty monks from the monastery, and replaced them with monks from other Orthodox monasteries of the desert. While he may have thought he had ended the opposition by the monastics, Eustochius' action did not end the Monophysite and Origenist resistance. In 564, Eustochius was deposed and Macarius II again became patriarch.

The date of his repose is not known.

Religious titles
Preceded by Macarius II	Patriarch of Jerusalem; 552-564	Succeeded by John IV
