= Praulius of Jerusalem =

Bishop of Jerusalem

St. Praulius (Pravlios, Praylius) was a bishop of Jerusalem from 417 to 422. He succeeded John II. According to Theodoret, Praulius' disposition and bearing suited the bishop's name, which is derived from the Greek word for "meek-spirited."

He is venerated as a saint in the Eastern Orthodox Church on August 27.

Preceded by John II	Bishop of Jerusalem; 417–422	Succeeded by Juvenal
