= Procopius II of Jerusalem =

Greek Orthodox Patriarch of Jerusalem

His Most Godly Beatitude Procopius II
- Patriarch of Jerusalem and All Palestine
- Church: Greek Orthodox Church of Jerusalem
- See: Jerusalem
- Installed: 1872
- Term ended: 1875
- Predecessor: Cyril II
- Successor: Hierotheus

Personal details
- Died: 1880

Procopius II (died 1880) was Greek Orthodox Patriarch of Jerusalem (December 28, 1872 – 1875).

Preceded by Cyril II	Greek Orthodox Patriarch of Jerusalem; 1872–1875	Succeeded by Hierotheus
