= Abraham II of Jerusalem =

Greek Orthodox Patriarch of Jerusalem (d. 1787)

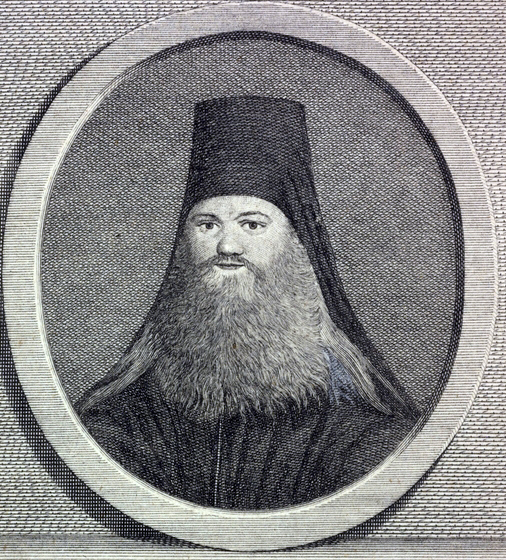
Abraham II

Abraham II (died 1787) was Greek Orthodox Patriarch of Jerusalem (June/July 1775 – November 13, 1787), Georgian by origin.

Preceded by Sophronius V	Greek Orthodox Patriarch of Jerusalem; 1775–1787	Succeeded by Procopius I
