= George of Jerusalem =

George of Jerusalem (died 807) was the Patriarch of Jerusalem from 797 until his death. Little is known about his activities while he was patriarch. At the time, the Church of Jerusalem was under the Abbasid Caliphate.

George was the syncellus of Patriarch Elias II before he became patriarch about 797. During the final years before the death of Patriarch Elias, Syncellus George sent a delegation to western Europe to Charlemagne to gain the help and protection of the Franks against the Muslims in the Holy Lands. George was succeeded by the deacon Thomas Tamriq upon his death in 807. George is listed as a saint only in the Palestinian-Georgian calendar, commemorated on April 7.

== Sources ==
- The History of the Church of Jerusalem
- George of Jerusalem

This article incorporates text from George of Jerusalem at OrthodoxWiki which is licensed under the CC-BY-SA and GFDL.

Religious titles
| Preceded by Elias II | Patriarch of Jerusalem; 797–807 | Succeeded by Thomas I |
