= Elias II of Jerusalem =

Elias II was the Patriarch of Jerusalem in 770–797. He was patriarch during the reign of Caliph Harun al-Rashid and during the Arab tribal wars in Palestine between the late 780s and 796. His patriarchate saw the plundering of the St. Chariton Monastery and the assault on the Mar Saba Monastery, in which some twenty monks were killed by tribal marauders. Prior to these attacks, Elias II penned and sent a letter to the Patriarch of Constantinople, known as the "reply of the Patriarchates in the East", in which he lamented the plight the Christians faced in his jurisdiction.

== Bibliography ==
- Gil, Moshe (1997) [1983]. A History of Palestine, 634–1099. Translated by Ethel Broido. Cambridge: Cambridge University Press. ISBN 0-521-59984-9.

Religious titles
Preceded by Theodore	Patriarch of Jerusalem; 770–797	Succeeded by George
