= Athanasius V of Jerusalem =

Greek Orthodox Patriarch of Jerusalem

Athanasius V (died 1844) was Greek Orthodox Patriarch of Jerusalem (1827 – December 28, 1844). He was born in Edirne.

Preceded by Polycarpus	Greek Orthodox Patriarch of Jerusalem; 1827–1844	Succeeded by Cyril II
