= Procopius I of Jerusalem =

Greek Orthodox Patriarch of Jerusalem

Procopius I (died 1788) was Greek Orthodox Patriarch of Jerusalem (1787 – November 3, 1788).

Preceded by Abraham II	Greek Orthodox Patriarch of Jerusalem; 1787–1788	Succeeded by Anthemus
