= Anthimus of Jerusalem =

Greek Orthodox Patriarch of Jerusalem

Anthimus (1717–1808) was Greek Orthodox Patriarch of Jerusalem (November 4, 1788 – November 22, 1808).

Manuscripts belonging to him were taken to England by Joseph Dacre Carlyle.

Preceded by Procopius I	Greek Orthodox Patriarch of Jerusalem; 1788–1808	Succeeded by Polycarpus
