= Basil of Jerusalem =

Basil of Jerusalem was the Patriarch of Jerusalem of the Church of Jerusalem from 821 to 842. During his episcopate, Basil actively opposed the iconoclasm that was supported by the Byzantine emperor Theophilus.

== Life ==
Basil, who was a follower of his predecessor Patriarch Thomas I of Jerusalem, was elected Patriarch of Jerusalem in 821. He actively opposed iconoclasm. In 836, he convened a council in Jerusalem that defended the veneration of icons. From the council, Basil sent this position of the council to emperor Theophilus in a letter carried by syncellus Michael. Theophilus, who was a confirmed iconoclast, jailed Michael upon his arrival.

In 841, Basil was able to fend off an attack on Jerusalem by the Arab rebel Abu Harb al-Mubarqa and his army of thirty thousand by buying him off.

Basil died the following year, 842, and was succeeded by Sergius I who was made the patriarch by the Arabs.

== Sources ==
- The History of the Church of Jerusalem
- Basil of Jerusalem

This article incorporates text from Basil of Jerusalem at OrthodoxWiki which is licensed under the CC-BY-SA and GFDL.

Religious titles
Preceded by Thomas I	Patriarch of Jerusalem; 821-842	Succeeded by John VI
