= John II (bishop of Jerusalem) =

Bishop of Jerusalem from 387 to 417

Saint and Bishop John II

Bishop of Jerusalem
- Born: 356
- Died: 10 January 417
- Venerated in: Eastern Orthodox Church; Catholic Church; Coptic Orthodox Church
- Feast: January 10th (Roman Catholic Church); March 30th (Eastern Orthodox Church and Byzantine Rite Catholics); Paona 13 (Coptic Orthodox Church)

John II (Greek: Ἰωάννης Β΄; c. 356 – 10 January 417) was bishop of Jerusalem from AD 387 to AD 417. John II succeeded to the episcopal throne of Jerusalem on the death of Cyril in 386 (or 387). He was the author, according to an increasing number of modern scholars, of the five Mystagogical Catecheses traditionally ascribed to his predecessor Cyril.

He is revered as a saint by the Eastern Orthodox Church and his feast day is held on March 30. He is also honored as a saint by the Roman Catholic Church, which commemorates him on 10 January (Martyrologium Romanum, 2004, p. 92). He is also commemorated in the Coptic Orthodox Church on Paona 13.

== Life ==
John's authority was harshly questioned twice by Jerome, then abbot in Bethlehem.

The first time was in the frame of the first polemic with Origen's followers, and is narrated mainly in Jerome's treatise dedicated to Pammachius "Contra Ioannes Hierosolymitanum (Against John of Jerusalem)", as well as in other letters of Jerome (n. 51, 82 and 86). Jerome accused John of supporting the ideas of the Origenists.

The Origenist doctrines attributed to John were: (i.) that the Son does not see the Father; (ii.) that souls are confined in earthly bodies, as in a prison; (iii.) that the devil may be saved; (iv.) that the skins with which God clothed Adam and Eve were human bodies; (v.) that the body in the resurrection will be without sex; (vi.) that the descriptions of Paradise are allegorical: trees meaning angels, and rivers the heavenly virtues; (vii) that the waters above and below the firmament are angels and devils; (viii.) that the image of God was altogether lost at the Fall. John ignored the accusations of Origenism and gave assurances about his faith in the Trinity: however, it is probable that John did have certain Origenist leanings.

The immediate occasion of this crisis was the visit of Epiphanius, bishop of Salamis in Cyprus, at Jerusalem, in 394. Epiphanius preached, in the Church of the Resurrection, a pointed sermon against Origenism, which was thought to be directly aimed at John. After many unseemly scenes, Epiphanius advised Jerome and his friends to separate from their bishop John. To be fully independent from him, Epiphanius ordained Paulinian (Jerome's brother) to priesthood. Epiphanius attempted to defend his irregular action, but John appealed to Alexandria against Jerome and his supporters as schismatics. The bishop, Theophilus, at once took the side of John. The dispute was thus prolonged for about four years, and, after some attempts at reconciliation, and the exhibition of much bitterness, amounting to the practical excommunication of Jerome and his friends, the dispute was stopped, perhaps by Theophilus. The dispute broke out afresh when Jerome deeply criticized the reception reserved by John for some of the 400 Origenistic monks of Nitria, dispelled by the Egyptian deserts by the bishop of Alexandria Theophilus (fifty of these monks went to Constantinople, and found there a cordial welcome with the bishop John Chrysostom in 401).

The second harsh attack against John was triggered off in 414 by Jerome and concerned Pelagius. Jerome, supported by a Latin disciple of Augustine of the name of Paulus Orosius, took a stand against the deacon Pelagius, who was then received in Jerusalem and not explicitly condemned by the local synod of Diospolis (415). We have a letter of Pope Innocent I who censures John for having allowed the Pelagians to cause a disturbance at Bethlehem and exhorts him to be more watchful over his diocese in future: this letter is dated 417, the year of the death of both John and Innocent, and it is probable that John never received it. Although sources are more diverse here, the accusation of arianism seems a little simplistic and it is probable that we do not have all the information needed to understand the situation.

In 415, two years before his death in 417, he was probably directly involved in the discovery of the Relics of Saint Stephen.

== Writings ==
According to the 5th century ecclesiastic writer Gennadius of Massilia, John "wrote a book against those who disparaged his studies, in which he shows that he follows the genius of Origen not his creed".

Due to his Damnatio memoriae, the writings of John II were not kept in general under his name, but, besides Mystagogical Catecheses, it is very much probable that certain homilies, in Greek, Georgian or Armenian, must be restored to him, as happened in the second half of 20th century for his homilies upon "the Feast of the Angels", and on the "Dedication of the Church of Holy Zion"

The edition of a liturgical lectionary of Jerusalem, preserved in an old Armenian version, is also attributed to him.

== Dedication of the Church of Holy Zion ==
According to M. van Esbrœck, John of Jerusalem showed great cleverness in understanding and including the Jewish Christian minority in Jerusalem. One of the acts that ratified the reconciliation of the Greek and the Judeo-Christian communities was the Consecration of the Church of Holy Zion on 394 CE: the homily pronounced by John was preserved in Armenian and not published until 1973.

The new building on Mount Zion left untouched the Judeo-Christian synagogue. The day of the consecration was, according to van Esbrœck, 15 September 394, and van Esbrœck suggests that it very probably corresponded in such a year to the 10th of Tishrei, the traditional day of the Hebraic holiday of Yom Kippur. The scholar Daniel Stokl Ben Ezra suggests that the eve of Yom Kippur coincided with 20 September, i.e. with the last day of the week of Christian celebration called the "Encaenia" (dedication of the church of the Holy Sepulchre, which celebration was connected to the discovering of the True Cross). Actually the central idea of John's homily is linked to the celebration of Kippur, through the blessing of the church altar, symbolized by the "Kaporet" (Mercy seat).

In the first part of this mystical and allegorical homily, the purification of the lips (Isaiah 6:7), associated with the purification of Kippur, is said to legitimatize the description of the descent of the Holy Spirit in the church-building, symbol of the whole Church. In the second part, John proposes a typology of the mystical experience describing seven heavenly circles accessible by the mediation of the Kaporet. At the eighth circle, there is the coming of the Holy Spirit as groom of the soul, as the Holy Spirit enters in the upper room (Acts 1:13). This homily includes more than three hundred allusions to Biblical verses (including also the apocryphal 4 Ezra) and is influenced by texts like the Ascension of Isaiah. John also addresses four times the monk Porphyry, future bishop of Gaza, who was probably present at the ceremony.

== Notes ==
Preceded by Saint Cyril of Jerusalem	Bishop of Jerusalem; 387–417	Succeeded by Praulius
