= Athanasius II of Jerusalem =

Athanasius II (Greek: Αθανάσιος Β΄; fl. 1229 – d. 1247+) was the Greek Orthodox Patriarch of Jerusalem from c. 1231 to 1244.

The Church of the Holy Sepulchre seems to have been largely in Athanasius' hands during the Latin control of Jerusalem. The Serbian Archbishop Sava (1174–1237) was the guest of Athanasius twice in the Holy Land, and according to Serbian chronicles they were good friends. After the Latin retreat from Jerusalem in 1244, the Melkites (who were the majority of the south of the Latin kingdom) turned to Athanasius. Athanasius II was in negotiations with the Pope through friar Lawrence of Portugal in 1247; Innocent IV supported him against the Latin patriarch, Robert.

== Sources ==
- Pringle, D. (2007). The Churches of the Crusader Kingdom of Jerusalem, The City of Jerusalem: A Corpus. Vol. 3. Cambridge University Press. pp. 3, 31–32, 211. ISBN 978-0-521-39038-5.
- Mileusnić, Slobodan (2000). Sveti Srbi. Novi Sad: Prometej. ISBN 86-7639-478-4. OCLC 44601641.
- Baldwin, Marshall (1985). "Missions to the East in the Thirteenth and Fourteenth centuries". In Setton, Kenneth M.; Zacour, Norman P.; Hazard, Harry W. (eds.). A History of the Crusades, Volume V: The Impact of the Crusades on the Near East. Vol. 5. Madison and London: University of Wisconsin Press. pp. 452–518. ISBN 0-299-09140-6.

Religious titles
Preceded by Euthemius II	Patriarch of Jerusalem (Orthodox) ca. 1231–47	Succeeded by Sophronius III
