= Theodosius of Jerusalem (died 879) =

Theodosius of Jerusalem was Patriarch of the Church of Jerusalem from 864 to 879.

Theodosius was a monk at a monastery near Jerusalem before he was elected the successor to Patriarch Solomon in 864. Theodosius was represented at the council held in Constantinople between 869-870 by his legate, syncellus Elijah. Elijah signed the decisions of the council that deposed Patriarch Photius of Constantinople and decreed that Patriarch Ignatius was improperly deposed. The acts of the 869 council were later abrogated by the council of 879 that affirmed the restoration of Patriarch Photius.

During the time of Theodosius' episcopate, the Church of Jerusalem apparently was experiencing peace and tranquility based on what was said in Theodosius' correspondence to Patriarch Ignatius and that he was able to send three monks to Western Europe to collect funds for the Church of Jerusalem.

Theodosius reposed in 879.

== Source ==
- The History of the Church of Jerusalem

This article incorporates text from Theodosius of Jerusalem at OrthodoxWiki which is licensed under the CC-BY-SA and GFDL.

Religious titles
Preceded by Solomon	Patriarch of Jerusalem; 864-879	Succeeded by Elias III
