= Christodulus II of Jerusalem =

Christodulus II of Jerusalem was the Melkite patriarch of Church of Jerusalem from 966 to 969.

He previously was known as Habib of Caesarea. Patriarch Christodulus began to restore the Church of the Holy Sepulchre that had been damaged by fire during the riots in 966, but was unable to finish the restoration because of his sudden death while visiting Cairo. Additionally, the Jacobite official, Ali Ibn Souwar, who was helping Christodulus with the restoration of the cupola of the Holy Sepulchre, was not able to complete his part of the work because he was killed.

== Sources ==
- Who is who in the Churches of Jerusalem

This article incorporates text from Christodulus II of Jerusalem at OrthodoxWiki which is licensed under the CC-BY-SA and GFDL.

Religious titles
Preceded by John VII	Patriarch of Jerusalem; 966-969	Succeeded by Thomas II
