= Christodulus I of Jerusalem =

Christodulus I of Jerusalem, also Christopher, was Melkite Patriarch of Jerusalem of the Church of Jerusalem from 937 to 951. Early in his patriarchate he was confronted with Muslim rioting and church destruction.

Originally named Habib; he was from Caesarea. He took the name Christodulus when he became the patriarch of Jerusalem. He succeeded Nicholas who was patriarch for a very short time in 937, and had been killed before the Church of the Holy Sepulchre. During the first years of his episcopate a major riot occurred during the liturgy on Palm Sunday, resulting in major damage to the Church of the Holy Sepulchre. While he was serving inside the Church the rioters set fire to it. The catastrophe on 24 March was recorded in the Jerusalem Calendar: “We must record with great and full bitterness the martyrdom of men, women, youths, and infants which took place on Palm Sunday.”

Further destruction occurred in Ashkelon where Muslims and Jews attacked and burned a church known as '“Mary the Green”. When the Bishop of Ashkelon attempted to obtain the permission of the caliph in Baghdad to rebuild the church, the Muslim partisans objected seriously, and he never received permission from the caliph.

Yet amid the rioting and persecutions, Patriarch Christodulus, in 941, was able to consecrate Isaac as the Patriarch of Alexandria in the Church of the Anastasis, or Resurrection, as the Church of the Holy Sepulchre is also known.

Patriarch Christodulus died in 951 and was succeeded by Agathon as patriarch.

== Sources ==
- The History of the Church of Jerusalem
- Christodoulos, patriarch of Jerusalem

This article incorporates text from Christodulus I of Jerusalem at OrthodoxWiki which is licensed under the CC-BY-SA and GFDL.

Religious titles
Preceded by Athanasius I	Patriarch of Jerusalem; 937-951	Succeeded by Agathon
