= John VII of Jerusalem =

Patriarch of Jerusalem 964-966

John VII was Patriarch of Jerusalem from 964 to 966. He was among the bishops of Jerusalem who is believed to have suffered a martyr's death at the hands of Muslim mobs. He was elected patriarch after the death of his predecessor Agathon in 964.

Two versions of his martyrdom have come down to us. The first involved revenge by the ruling governor. John became patriarch during the rule of the Ikhshidid governor Muhammad Ismail ibn al-Sanaji in Jerusalem. Muhammad demanded gifts be made to him on every occasion, that were a major expense on the patriarchate. Patriarch John complained to El Hasan, governor of Ramleh about these demands. In 966, after having complained several times, Muhammad took revenge on John by stirring up the Muslim mobs against the patriarch. The mob descended on the Church of the Holy Sepulchre, set it on fire, and caused its cupola to collapse. Then the mob turned to the church on Mount Zion, which they also burned. The next day the mob continued its reign of destruction during which they found John hiding in the oil cistern of the Church of the Holy Sepulchre, and murdered him. The mob then took his corpse to the yard of the Church where they burned it.

A second version of his martyrdom maintains John was burned at the stake by a Muslim mob after writing to the Byzantine Emperor Nikephoros II Phokas, pleading with him to hasten to Palestine and retake it from the Fatimid caliphs; however, Nikephoros did not take control of Palestine until the 970s.

== Sources ==
- The History of the Church of Jerusalem

This article incorporates text from John VII of Jerusalem at OrthodoxWiki which is licensed under the CC-BY-SA and GFDL.

Religious titles
Preceded by Agathon	Patriarch of Jerusalem; 964-966	Succeeded by Christodulus II
