= Timotheus I of Jerusalem =

Greek clergyman

His Most Godly Beatitude Timotheus I
- Patriarch of Jerusalem and All Palestine
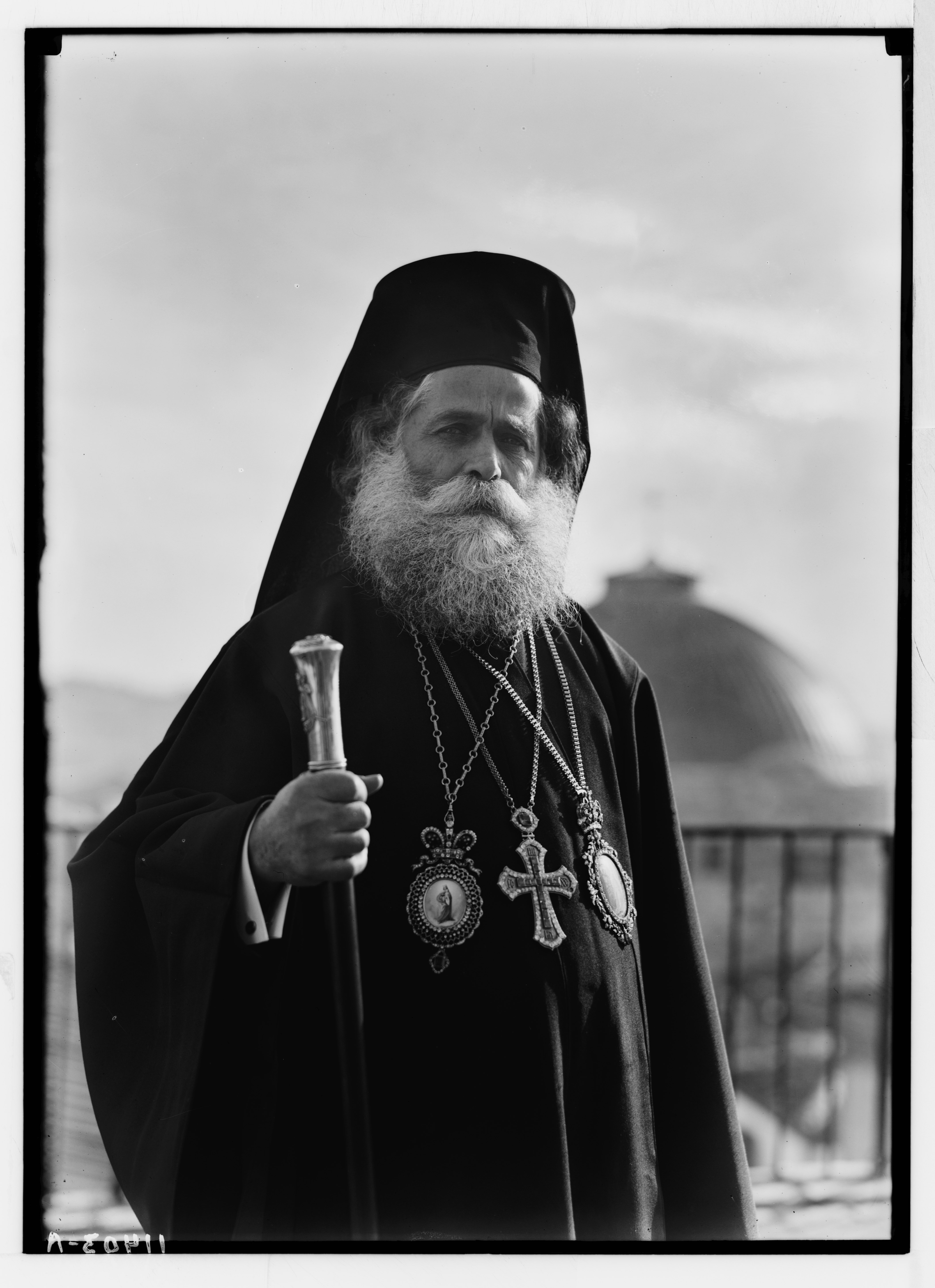
- Timotheus I in the 1940s
- Church: Greek Orthodox Church of Jerusalem
- See: Jerusalem
- Installed: 1935
- Term ended: 1955
- Predecessor: Damian I
- Successor: Benedict I
- Previous post: Archbishop of Jordan (1917-1935)

Personal details
- Born: Timotheos Themelis; 1878 Samos, Greece
- Died: December 31, 1955 (aged 77) Jerusalem
- Education: School of the Holy Cross in Jerusalem; Oxford University

Timotheos Themelis (1878–1955) was a clergyman who served as Archbishop of Jordan and later Greek Orthodox Patriarch of Jerusalem.

Born in Samos, Greece in 1878, Themelis was a graduate of the School of the Holy Cross in Jerusalem, and studied at Oxford University for four years. In 1931 he founded the theological quarterly New Zion. In 1947 he was appointed Knight of the British Empire for "his services in bringing the Christian communities of the Holy Land into closer cooperation." He was also an author, writing fifteen volumes on "theological subjects."

As Patriarch Timotheus I of Jerusalem (r. 1935–1955), he expressed willingness to sell the Church’s lands in Caesarea to the Palestine Jewish Colonization Association (PICA), on the condition that his election be confirmed by the British Mandatory authorities. Historians note that while this willingness coincided with his confirmation process, broader political considerations and inter-Orthodox rivalries were the decisive factors in his recognition rather than the specific land negotiations.

Preceded by Damian I	Greek Orthodox Patriarch of Jerusalem; 1935-1955	Succeeded by Benedict I
