= Mark the Deacon =

Mark the Deacon (Latin: Marcus Diaconus; Greek: Μάρκος ό Διάκονος) was a Roman Christian hagiographer. A native of the province of Asia, he was the companion of Bishop Porphyrius of Gaza from 395 until 420, a deacon in his church and his biographer.

Mark worked as a calligrapher in Jerusalem. He met Porphyrius during one of the latter's visits there, entering his service around 395 and following him to Gaza after his appointment as bishop. Mark went to Thessalonica to arrange the sale of the property still owned by Porphyrius there and, upon his return, the proceeds were distributed among the monasteries of Egypt and among the necessitous in and around Jerusalem. Mark was a strong ally of Porphyrius in his campaign to close the pagan temples of Gaza. He eventually became a deacon of the church in Gaza.

Mark's Vita sancti Porphyrii (Life of Saint Porphyrius) is "the most detailed account of the Christianization of a smaller Greek city that we possess" and its historical value is therefore high. Besides that, "it is lucidly and vividly written", in some ways like a novel. It is known from versions in Greek, Latin and Georgian. Formerly it was known only in a Latin translation, but in 1874 Moriz Haupt published the Greek text, and a new edition was issued in 1895 by the Bonn Philological Society. Subsequently, the Georgian text came to light. It appears to have been translated from a lost Syriac original.

While the original text was Greek, questions have been raised about the transmission extant Greek text. It has been suggested that the preserved Greek text is in fact a back-translation from Syriac, and that the Georgian text is more reliable.

== Editions ==
- Hill, George Francis, ed. (1913). The Life of Porphyry, Bishop of Gaza. Oxford: Clarendon Press.
- Societas Philologa Bonnensis, ed. (1895). Marci Diaconi Vita Porphyrii, episcopi gazensis. Leipzig: B. G. Teubner.
- Grégoire, H.; Kugener, M.-A., eds. (1930). Marc le Diacre: Vie de Porphyre évêque de Gaza. Paris.
