= Damian I of Jerusalem =

Israeli Greek Orthodox Patriarch

His Most Godly Beatitude Damian I
- Patriarch of Jerusalem and All Palestine
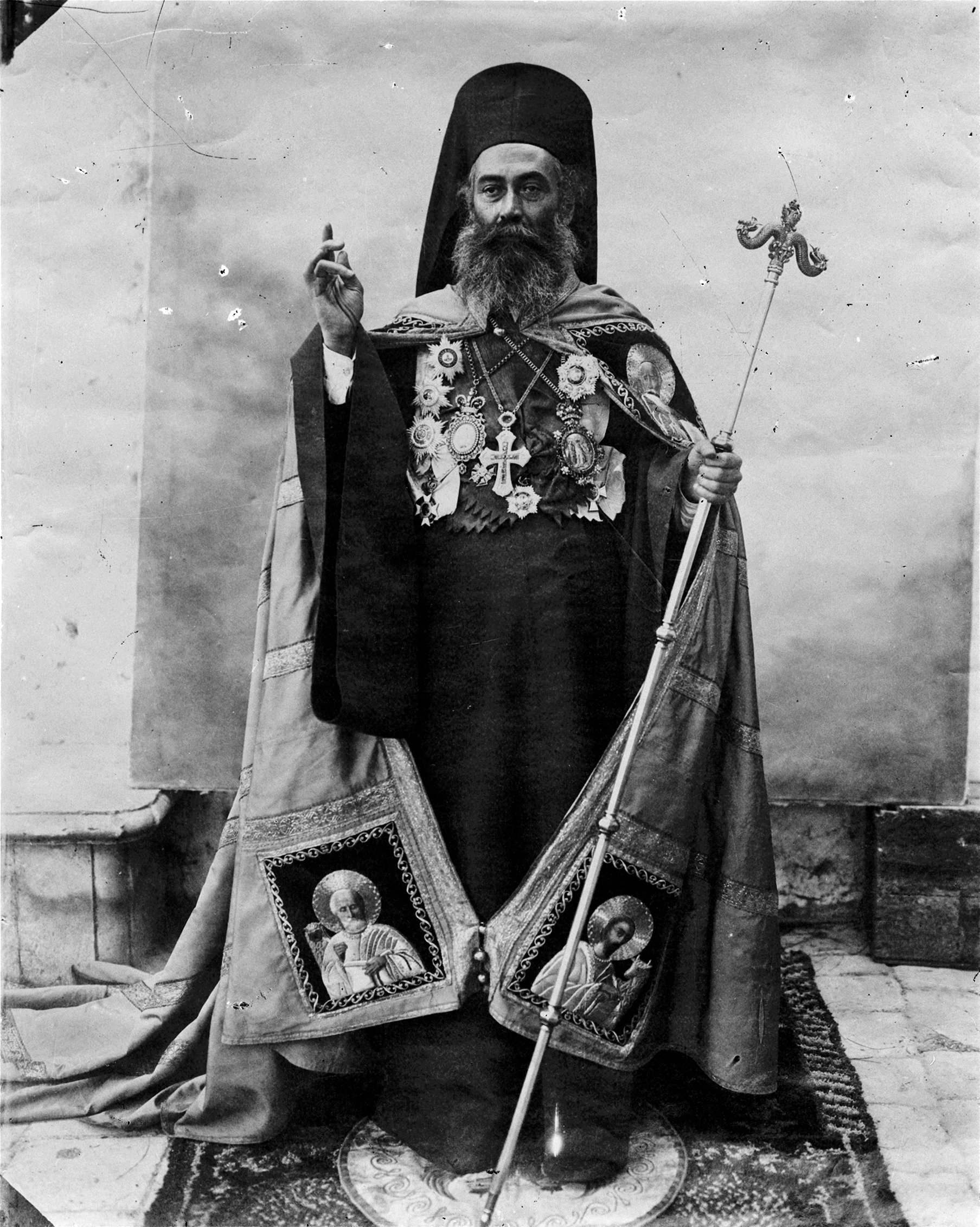
- Damian I in patriarchal vestments
- Church: Greek Orthodox Church of Jerusalem
- See: Jerusalem
- Installed: 1897
- Term ended: 1931
- Predecessor: Gerasimus I
- Successor: Timotheus I

Personal details
- Born: July 10, 1848
- Died: August 14, 1931 (aged 83)

Damian I (July 10, 1848 – August 14, 1931) was Greek Orthodox Patriarch of Jerusalem from 1897 to 1931.

During the patriarchate of Damian I of Jerusalem, the Greek Orthodox Church expanded its rural land acquisitions in Palestine, including the 1909 purchase of 600 dunams south of Caesarea’s Roman road from Ottoman governor Sadeq Pasha. This acquisition formed part of a wider strategy of establishing agricultural estates in areas of religious and strategic significance, supported by Russian imperial patronage in the late Ottoman period.

Preceded by Gerasimus I	Greek Orthodox Patriarch of Jerusalem; 1897–1931	Succeeded by Timoetheus I

== Literature ==
- f. E: Dowling. The Orthodox Greek Patriarchate of Jerusalem. London: 1913, 27-36.
- Maximos Philadelpheias: Πατριάρχης Ιεροσσολύμων Δαμιανός. In: Ορθοδοξία 6 (1931) 453–462.
