= Phanourios the Newly-Revealed =

Greek Orthodox saint

Saint Phanourios the Newly-Revealed
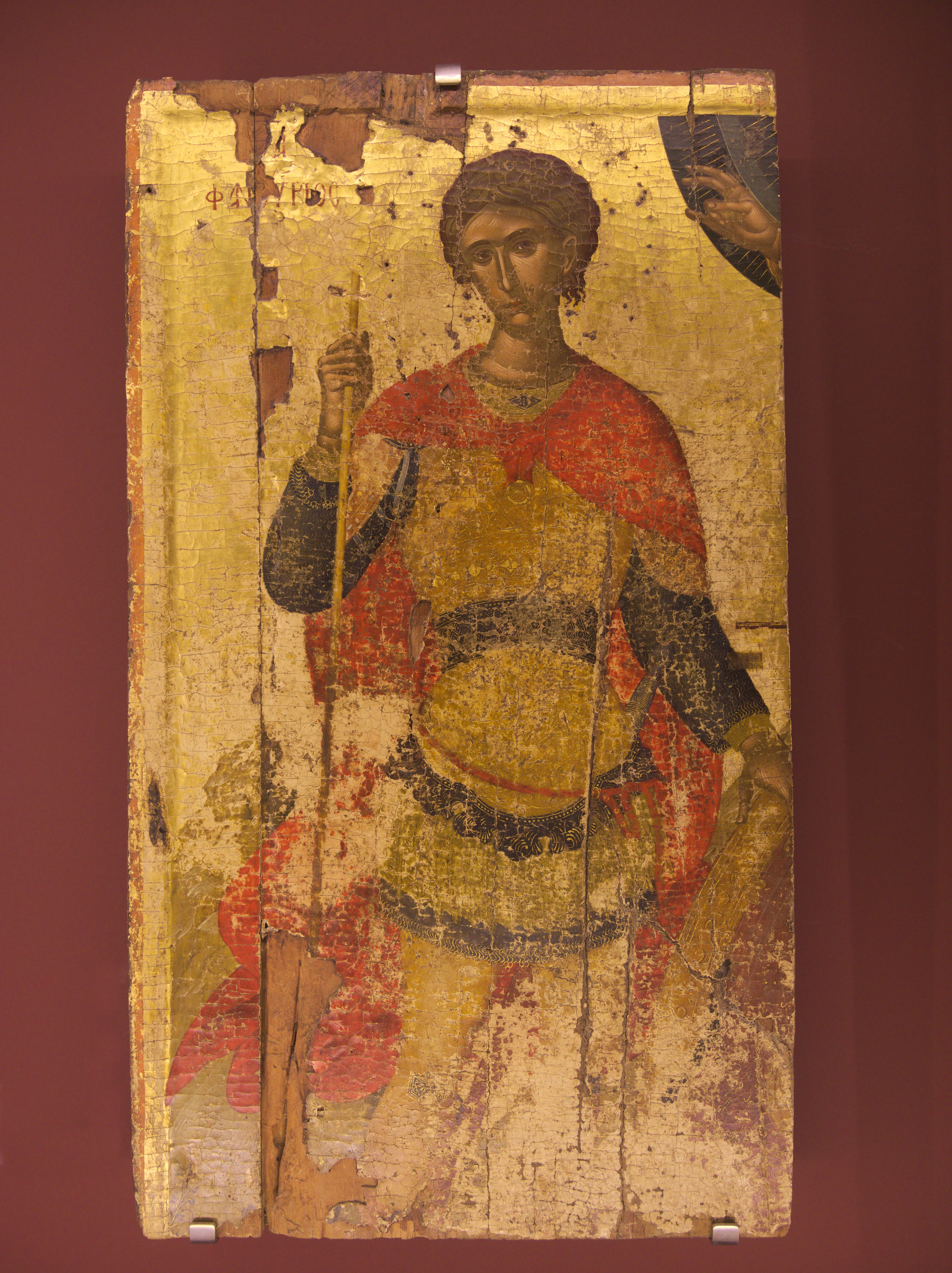

Great Martyr, Newly-Revealed
- Born: Unknown
- Died: Unknown; Rhodes
- Venerated in: Eastern Orthodox Church; Roman Catholic Church
- Feast: August 27
- Attributes: Martyr's cross soldier holding a candle, symbolic of his patronage as a finder of lost objects red robes, signifying martyrdom
- Patronage: Lost objects Rhodes

Phanourios (Greek: Φανούριος, lit. 'the revealer') also known as Phanourios the Newly Revealed (Greek: Άγιος Φανούριος ο Νεοφανής, romanized: Agios Fanoúrios o Neofanís) is venerated as a saint by the Eastern Orthodox Church and the Roman Catholic Church. He is commemorated on August 27.

Cretan school artist Angelos Akotantos from Crete had painted a number of icons of Phanourios, many times depicting him killing a dragon; this tradition is found mainly in Crete especially in icons of the 15th century when Phanourios is said to have saved many Cretans from certain death from the hands of the invading Ottomans.

The chapel of Saint Phanourios near the village of Agios Georgios on the north coast of the island of Cyprus is located near fossil bones of pygmy hippopotamuses. Locals believed them to be the bones of the saint and would powder them into a healing drink. The Cypriot dwarf hippopotamus, Hippopotamus minor, was assigned the binomial name Phanourios minutus in 1972.

== History ==
Everything known about Phanourios comes from the icons found on the island of Rhodes in the 16th century. Some traditions state that his mother was a sinful woman, whom Phanourios prayed for fervently, though she refused to repent in her life. It is evident from his iconography that he was a soldier who lived on the island of Rhodes, and was severely tortured and eventually slain by the Romans.

Years after his martyrdom, an icon depicting Phanourios was discovered in a ruined chapel on the island, among other pieces of iconography by non-Christian construction workers. The Bishop of Rhodes was summoned to the scene of the icon, whereupon he pronounced Phanourios to be a saint. The veneration of Saint Phanourios subsequently spread to Cyprus, and then to Greece.

== Veneration ==
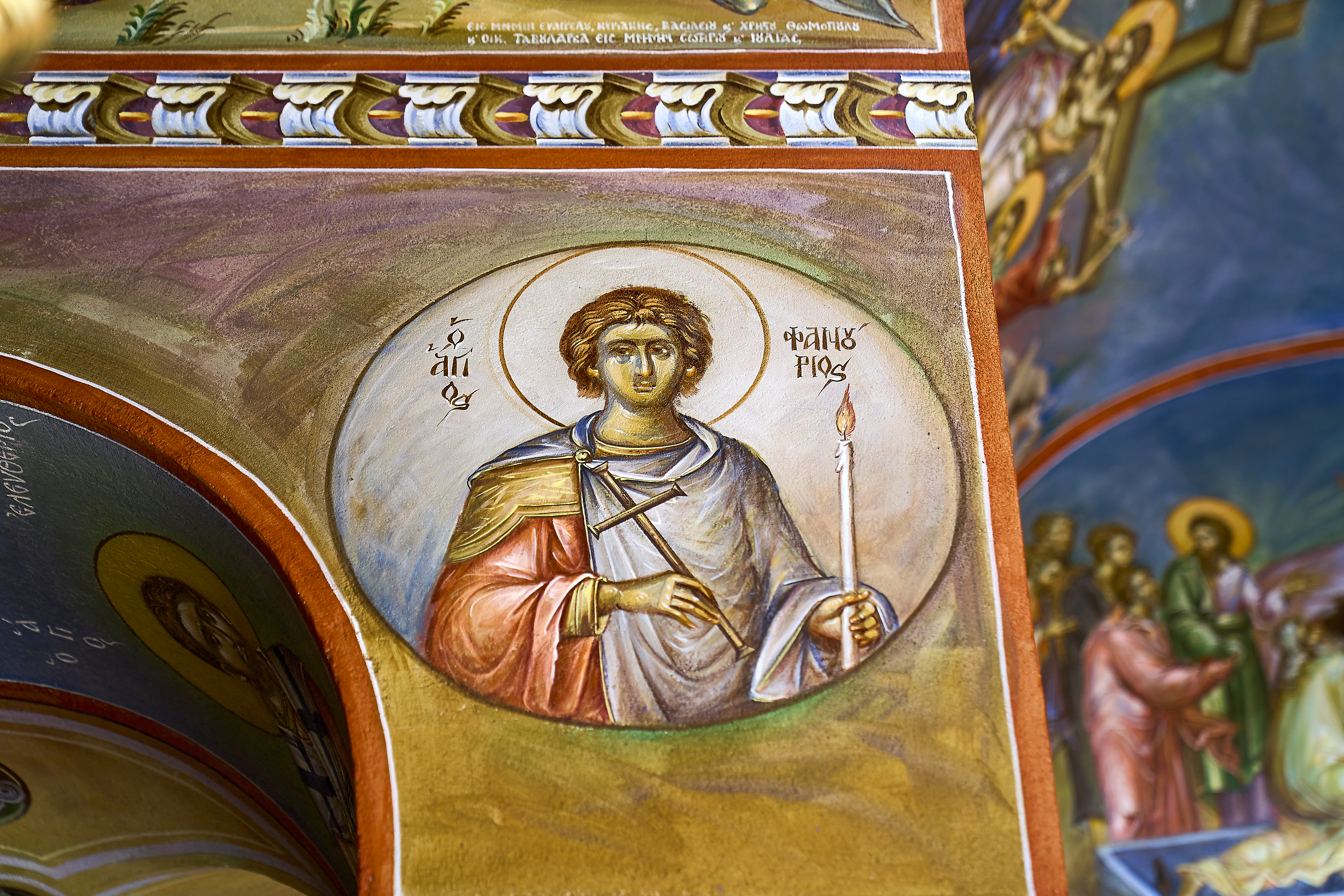
A mural depicting Saint Phanourios in Greece

Phanourios is said to have been awarded the martyr's crown in the Orthodox Christian faith. He is given the saint titles of Great Martyr and Newly-Revealed. He is also well known for finding people's lost belongings after fervent supplications, according to the tradition of the Eastern Orthodox Church.

A Vatican manuscript also commemorates his miracles in finding lost animals and objects and healing people.

A Greek dessert called a Fanouropita (Φανουρόπιτα) is often baked on the feast day of Saint Phanourios by Eastern Orthodox Christians, but is also baked on other days. It is a lenten cake, and it's traditionally made and offered as a way to say thanks to the saint for his help finding missing things, the source of this tradition can be rooted to the very revealing of his holy icon. Around that time, he had been forgotten by the Church and therefore lost, so he promised, as he had been found, to help other with his prayers to find what they lost, and asked that this cake be made as a memorial for his mother, as it is customary in Orthodox tradition to offer wheat cakes or Koliva for the loved ones who have passed.
