= Elias III of Jerusalem =

Patriarch of Jerusalem from c.879 to 907

Elias III was the Patriarch of Jerusalem from about 879 to 907.

According to the annals of Eutychius of Alexandria, he was a descendant of the family of Mansur ibn Sarjun, the grandfather of John of Damascus.

There is evidence that he sent a circular letter to European rulers asking for financial help in restoring the churches in his diocese. One of them was received by the Carolingian Emperor Charles the Fat in 881, and another was probably sent to king Alfred the Great. According to Asser, Elias corresponded with Alfred and sent him gifts, and a medical text in Old English contains information about remedies for Alfred's ailments sent to him by Elias.

According to Eutychius, he was appointed in the tenth regnal year of the Abbasid caliph al-Mu'tamid (r. 870–892), and remained in office until his death, a period of 22 years.

Religious titles
Preceded by Theodosius	Patriarch of Jerusalem; 879-907	Succeeded by Sergius II
