= Nicodemus I of Jerusalem =

Greek Orthodox priest (1828–1910)

His Most Godly Beatitude Nicodemus I
- Patriarch of Jerusalem and All Palestine
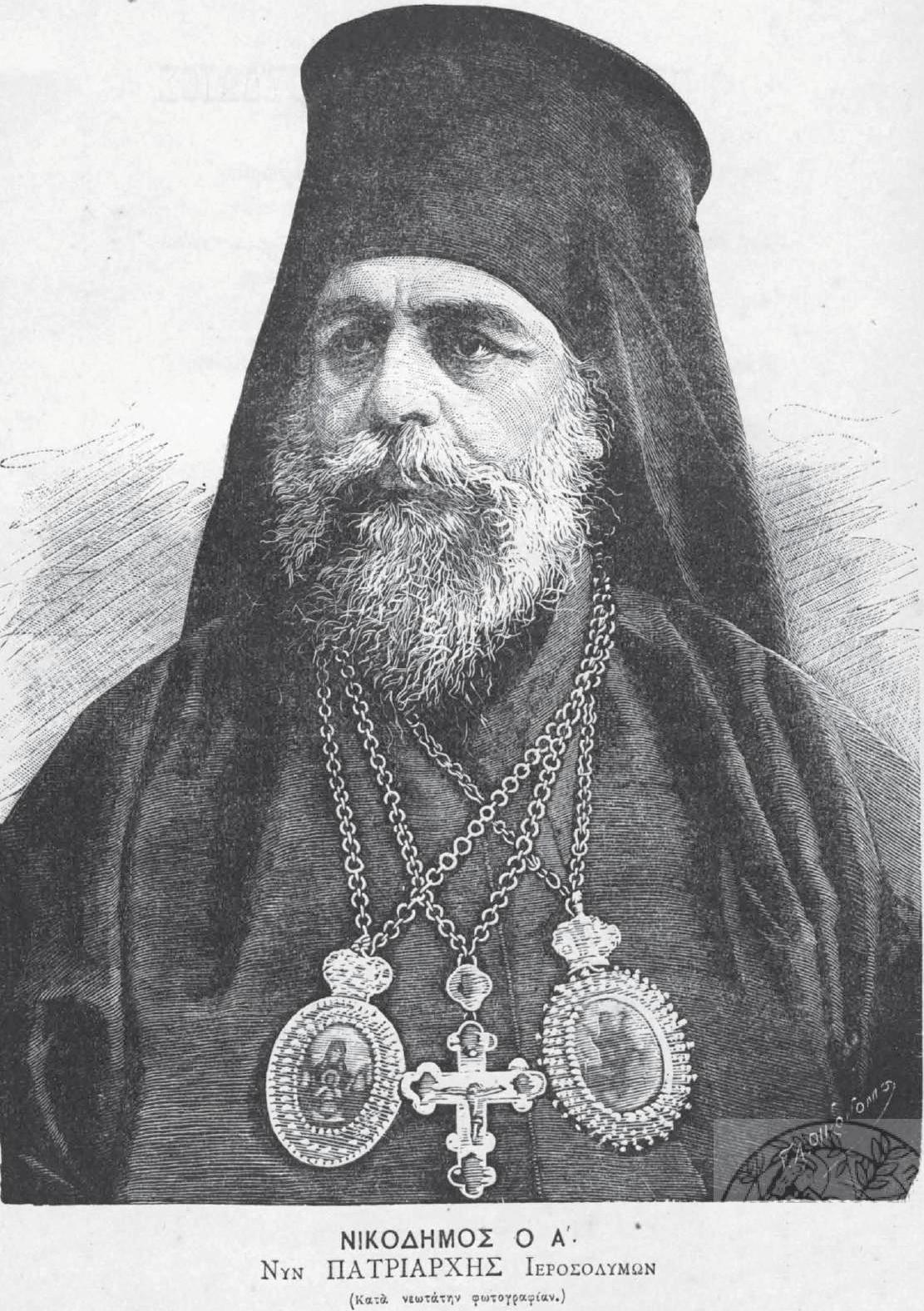
- 1887 depiction of Nicodemus I
- Church: Greek Orthodox Church of Jerusalem
- See: Jerusalem
- Installed: 1883
- Term ended: 1890
- Predecessor: Hierotheus
- Successor: Gerasimus I

Personal details
- Born: November 30, 1828 Constantinople, Ottoman Empire
- Died: February 18, 1910 (aged 81)

Nicodemus I (November 30, 1828 – February 18, 1910) was Greek Orthodox Patriarch of Jerusalem (1883–1890). He was born in Constantinople.

In 1890 he built a summer house near the San Simon monastery in Katamon.

Preceded by Hierotheus	Greek Orthodox Patriarch of Jerusalem; 1883–1890	Succeeded by Gerasimus I
