= Anastasius I of Jerusalem =

Patriarch of the Church of Jerusalem from 458 to 478

Anastasius I of Jerusalem was the patriarch of the Church of Jerusalem from 458 to 478.

Little is known of the life of Patr. Anastasius. He succeeded Patr. Juvenal as patriarch in 458. During his patriarchate, he officiated, in 473, at the funeral of St. Euthymius the Great, a monk at the monastery of St. Theoktistos in Palestine. Patr. Anastasius waited the entire day for the monks and people of Jerusalem to say their last farewell to St. Euthymius before Patr. Anastasius could finish the funeral service.

Religious titles
Preceded by Juvenal of Jerusalem	Patriarch of Jerusalem; 458-478	Succeeded by Martyrius
