= Anastasius II of Jerusalem =

Anastasius II of Jerusalem was patriarch of the Church of Jerusalem from an unknown date until 706 as the see of Jerusalem came under control of the nascent Muslim caliphate, and church life was disrupted by the Monothelite controversy.

The records for the Patriarchate of Jerusalem after the reign of Patriarch Sophronius are sparse and tempered by Muslim interventions. After the death of Sophronius in 638, Bishop Stephen of Dora served as a Patriarchal Vicar, assisted by John of Philadelphia (Amman). During the same period, the Muslims attempted to install the Monoenergist Bishop Sergius of Jaffa as the patriarch, but the Orthodox clergy, including Stephen of Dora (assisted by John of Philadelphia after 649), refused to recognise him.

To strengthen the position of the Orthodox, Stephen of Dora travelled to Pope Martin I in Rome, who on Stephen's recommendation assigned Bishop John of Philadelphia as Patriarchal Vicar for the Church of Jerusalem. Pope Martin also sent letters that announced his decision and asked that John be recognised. From this time on there are no records about the patriarchate until 705. During this period, it is only known that Anastasius had signed the decisions, probably as the patriarch, of the Quinisext Council of 692 in Constantinople during which the decision was made that the Jerusalem patriarchate occupied fifth position in the ranks of the patriarchates.

== Sources ==
Religious titles
Preceded by Sophronius until 638 (then vacant)	Patriarch of Jerusalem; 681–706	Succeeded by John V
