= Greek Orthodox Patriarch of Jerusalem =

Primate of the Eastern Orthodox Church in Jerusalem

- Archbishopric

Eastern Orthodox
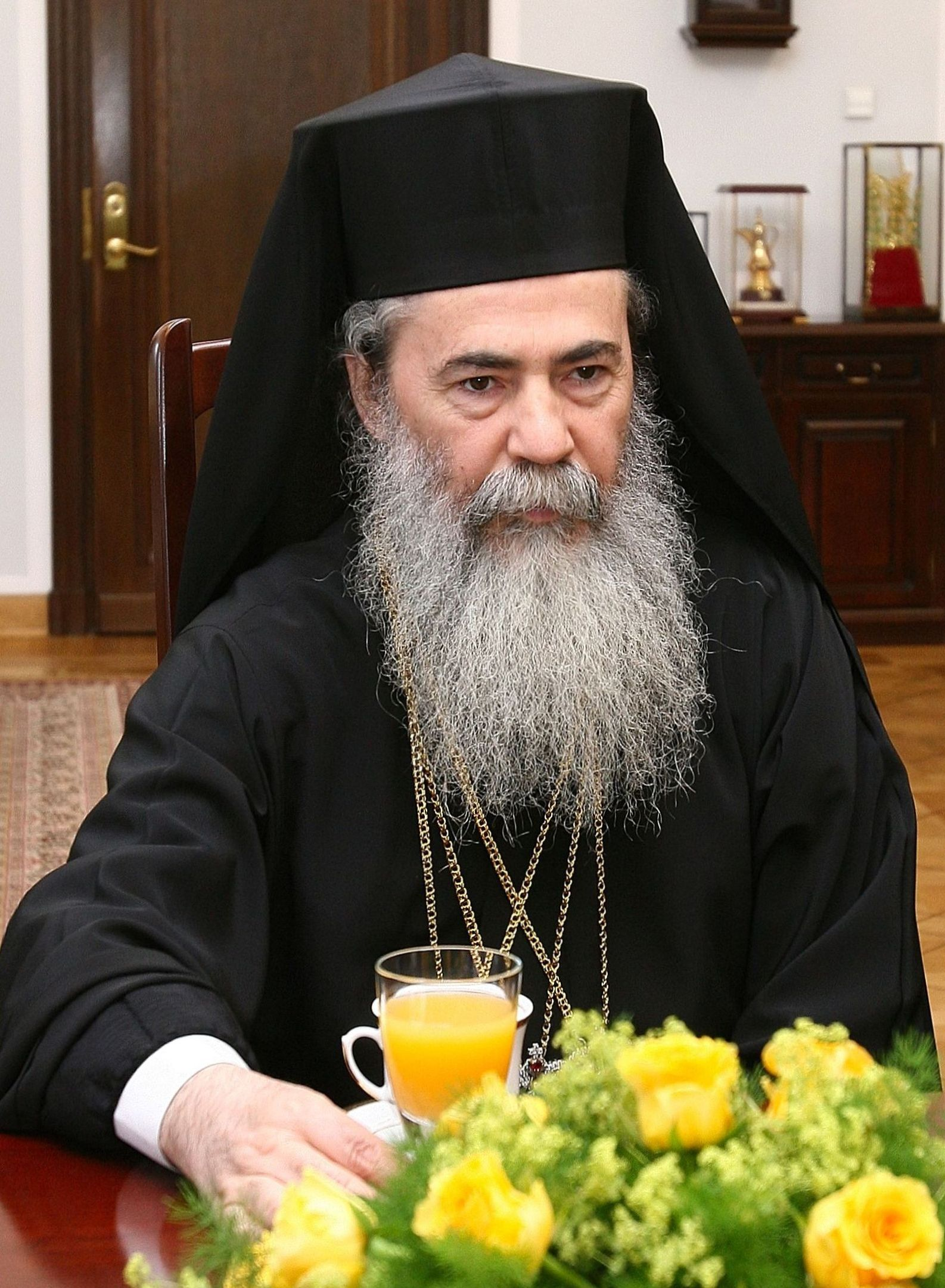
- Incumbent; Patriarch Theophilos III
- Style: His Most Godly Beatitude

Information
- First holder: James the Just
- Established: 33 (founded); 531 (granted title of patriarch)
- Cathedral: Church of the Holy Sepulchre

Website
- jerusalem-patriarchate.info

The Greek Orthodox patriarch of Jerusalem or Eastern Orthodox patriarch of Jerusalem, officially Patriarch of Jerusalem (Greek: Πατριάρχης Ιεροσολύμων; Arabic: بطريرك القدس; Hebrew: פטריארך ירושלים), is the head bishop of the Greek Orthodox Patriarchate of Jerusalem, ranking fourth of nine patriarchs in the Eastern Orthodox Church. Since 2005, the Eastern Orthodox patriarch of Jerusalem has been Theophilos III. The patriarch is styled "Patriarch of the Holy City of Jerusalem and all Holy Land, Syria, beyond the Jordan River, Cana of Galilee, and Holy Zion". The patriarch is the head of the Brotherhood of the Holy Sepulchre and the religious leader of about 400,000 Eastern Orthodox Christians in the Middle East. Most of them are Palestinian and Jordanian Christians.

The patriarchate traces its line of succession to the first Christian bishops of Jerusalem, the first being James the Just in the 1st century AD. Jerusalem was granted autocephaly in 451 by the Council of Chalcedon and in 531 became one of the initial five patriarchates.

On the importance of Jerusalem in Christianity, the Catholic Encyclopedia reads:

During the first Christian centuries the church at this place (referring to the cenacle) was the centre of Christianity in Jerusalem, "Holy and glorious Sion, mother of all churches". Certainly no spot in Christendom can be more venerable than the place of the Last Supper, which became the first Christian church.

== History ==
In the Apostolic Age the Christian Church was organized as an indefinite number of local Churches that in the initial years looked to that at Jerusalem as its main centre and point of reference. James the Just, who was martyred around 62, is described as the first bishop of Jerusalem. Roman persecutions following the Jewish revolts against Rome in the later 1st and 2nd centuries also affected the city's Christian community, and led to Jerusalem gradually being eclipsed in prominence by other sees, particularly those of Constantinople, Antioch, Alexandria, and Rome. However, increased pilgrimage during and after the reign of Constantine the Great increased the fortunes of the see of Jerusalem, and in 325 the First Council of Nicaea attributed special honor, but not metropolitan status (then the highest rank in the Church), to the bishop of Jerusalem. Jerusalem continued to be a bishopric until 451, when the Council of Chalcedon granted Jerusalem independence from the metropolitan of Antioch and from any other higher-ranking bishop, granted what is now known as autocephaly, in the council's seventh session whose "Decree on the Jurisdiction of Jerusalem and Antioch" contains: "the bishop of Jerusalem, or rather the most holy Church which is under him, shall have under his own power the three Palestines". This led to Jerusalem becoming a patriarchate, one of the five patriarchates known as the pentarchy, when the title of "patriarch" was created in 531 by Justinian I.

When the Great Schism took place in 1054 the Patriarch of Jerusalem and the other three Eastern Patriarchs formed the Eastern Orthodox Church, and the Patriarch of Rome (i.e. the Pope) formed the Roman Catholic Church.

In 1099 the Crusaders appointed a Latin patriarch. As a result, the Eastern Orthodox patriarchs lived in exile in Constantinople until 1187.

== Current position ==
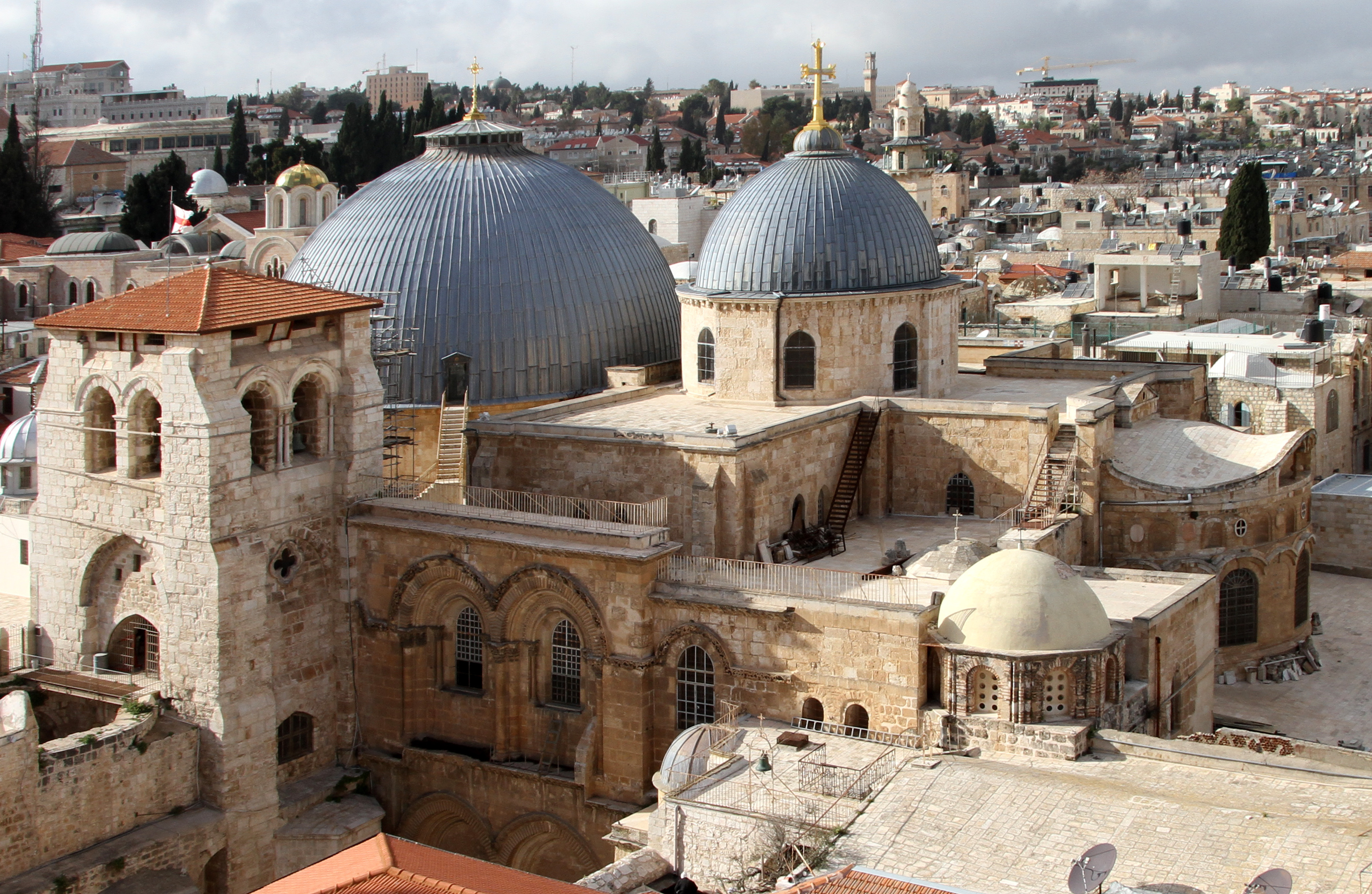
Church of the Holy Sepulchre

The number of Eastern Orthodox Christians in the Holy Land is estimated to be about 200,000. A majority of Church members are Arab citizens of Israel and Palestinian Arabs, and there are also a small number of Assyrians, Greeks and Georgians. The headquarters of the patriarchate is the Church of the Holy Sepulchre in Jerusalem.

In 2005, Patriarch Irenaios was deposed by the Holy Synod of Jerusalem after being accused of involvement in the sale of church land in East Jerusalem to Israeli investors. A special Pan-Orthodox Synod was convened in Constantinople (Istanbul) to review the decision of the Holy Synod of Jerusalem. The Pan-Orthodox Synod under the presidency of the Ecumenical Patriarch of Constantinople Bartholomew I, overwhelmingly confirmed the decision of the Brotherhood of the Holy Sepulchre and struck Irenaios' name from the diptychs. Metropolitan Cornelius of Petra was chosen to serve as locum tenens pending the election of a replacement for Irenaios. On August 22, 2005, Theophilos, the former Archbishop of Tabor, was elected as the 141st Patriarch of Jerusalem.

== List of patriarchs ==
=== Resident in Jerusalem (451–1099) ===
The Council of Chalcedon in 451 raised the bishop of Jerusalem to the rank of patriarch (see Pentarchy). However, Byzantine politics meant that Jerusalem passed from the jurisdiction of the Patriarch of Antioch to the Greek authorities in Constantinople. For centuries, Eastern Orthodox clergy, such as the Brotherhood of the Holy Sepulchre, dominated the Jerusalem church.

- Juvenal (451–458); Theodosius was the anti-Chalcedonian counter-bishop (451–453), in opposition to Juvenal.
- Anastasius I (458–478)
- Martyrius (478–486)
- Sallustius (486–494)
- Elias I (494–516)
- John III (516–524)
- Peter (524–544)
- Macarius II (544–552, 564–575)
- Eustochius (552–564)
- John IV (575–594)
- Amos (594–601)
- Isaac (601–609)
- Zacharias (609–632)
- Modestus (632–634)
- Sophronius I (634–638)
  - vacant (638–681?/692)
    - Patriarchal Vicar Stephen of Dora assisted by John of Philadelphia (after 649–?)
- Anastasius II (681?/692–706)
- John V (706–735)
- Theodore (745–770)
- Elias II (770–797)
- George (797–807)
- Thomas I (807–820)
- Basileus (820–838)
- John VI (838–842)
- Sergius I (842–844)
  - vacant (844–855)
- Solomon (855–860)
  - vacant (860–862)
- Theodosius (862–878)
- Elias III (878–907)
- Sergius II (908–911)
- Leontius I (912–929)
- Athanasius I (929–937)
- Christodolus (937–950)
- Agathon (950–964)
- John VII (964–966)
- Christodolus II (966–969)
- Thomas II (969–978)
  - vacant (978–980)
- Joseph II (980–983)
- Orestes (983–1005)
  - vacant (1005–1012)
- Theophilus I (1012–1020)
- Nicephorus I (1020–1048)
- Joannichius (1048–???)
- Sophronius II (???–1084)
- Euthemius I (1084)
- Simeon II (1084–1099)

=== In exile (1099–1187) ===
As a result of the First Crusade in 1099, a Latin Patriarchate was created, with residence in Jerusalem from 1099 to 1187. Eastern Orthodox patriarchs continued to be appointed, but resided in Constantinople.

- Savvas (1106–11??)
- John VIII (11??–11??)
- Nicolas (11??–11??)
- John IX (1156–1166)
- Nicephorus II (1166–1170)
- Leontius II (1170–1189)

=== Resident in Jerusalem (from 1187) ===
In 1187, the Latin patriarch was forced to flee the city of Jerusalem due to the Muslim reconquest of Jerusalem. The office remained and appointments continued to be made by the Catholic Church, with the Latin patriarch residing in the Frankish-controlled Levant until 1374, and subsequently in Rome until modern times. The Eastern Orthodox patriarchs at this period were.

- Dositheos I (February 1189; October 1189 – 10 September 1191)
- Marcus II (1191?–?)
  - vacant (?–1223)
- Euthemius II (1223)
- Athanasius II (ca. 1231–1244)
- Sophronius III (1236–?)
- Gregory I (?–1298)
- Thaddaeus (1298)
  - vacant (1298–1313)
- Athanasius III (1313–1314)
  - vacant (1314–1322)
- Gregory II (1322)
  - vacant (1322–1334)
- Lazarus (1334–1368)
  - vacant (1368–1376)
- Dorotheus I (1376–1417)
- Theophilus II (1417–1424)
- Theophanes I (1424–1431)
- Joachim (1431–?)
  - vacant (?–1450)
- Theophanes II (1450)
  - vacant (1450–1452)
- Athanasius IV (1452–???)
  - vacant (?–1460)
- Jacob II (1460)
  - vacant (1460–1468)
- Abraham I (1468)
- Gregory III (1468–1493)
  - vacant (1493–1503)
- Marcus III (1503)
  - vacant (1503–1505)
- Dorotheus II (1505–1537)
- Germanus (1537–1579)
- Sophronius IV (1579–1608)
- Theophanes III (1608–1644)
- Paiseus (1645–1660)
- Nectarius I (1660–1669)
- Dositheos II (1669–1707)
- Chrysanthus (1707–1731)
- Meletius (1731–1737)
- Parthenius (1737–1766)
- Ephram II (1766–1771)
- Sophronius V (1771–1775)
- Abraham II (1775–1787)
- Procopius I (1787–1788)
- Anthemus (1788–1808)
- Polycarpus (1808–1827)
- Athanasius V (1827–1845)
- Cyril II (1845–1872)
- Procopius II (1872–1875)
- Hierotheus (1875–1882)
- Nicodemus I (1883–1890)
- Gerasimus I (1891–1897)
- Damian I (1897–1931)
- Timotheus I (1935–1955)
  - vacant (1955–1957)
- Benedict I (1957–1980)
- Diodoros I (1980–2000)
- Irenaios I (2000–2005)
- Theophilos III (2005–present)

== Hierarchy of the throne ==
Styles of The Patriarch
- Reference style: His Most Godly Beatitude
- Spoken style: Your Beatitude
- Religious style: Patriarch
- Posthumous style: N/A

- Metropolitan of Caesarea : Vasilios (Christos Blatsos)
- Metropolitan of Scythopolis : Iakovos (George Kapenekas)
- Metropolitan of Petra : Cornelios (Emmanuel Rodousakis)
- Metropolitan of Ptolemais : Palladios (Vasilios Antoniou)
- Metropolitan of Nazareth : Kyriakos (Andreas Georgopetris)
- Metropolitan of Neapolis : Amvrosios (Nikolaos Antonopoulos)
- Metropolitan of Capitolias : Isyhios (Elias Condogiannis)
- Metropolitan of Botsra : Timotheos (Theodoros Margaritis)
- Metropolitan of Eleutheropolis : Christodoulos (Christos Saridakis)
- Metropolitan of Philadelphia : Benediktos (George Tsekouras)
- Archbishop of Gerasa : Theophanis (Theodosios Hasapakis)
- Archbishop of Tiberias : Alexios (Alexios Moschonas)
- Archbishop of Abila : Dorotheos (Demetrios Leovaris)
- Archbishop of Joppa : Damaskinos (Anastasios Gaganiaras)
- Archbishop of Constantina : Aristarchos (Antonios Peristeris)
- Archbishop of Mount Tabor : Methodios (Nikolaos Liveris)
- Archbishop of Jordan : Theophylactos (Theodosios Georgiadis)
- Archbishop of Sebastia : Theodosios (Nizar Hanna)
- Archbishop of Askalon : Nicephoros (Nikolaos Baltadgis)
- Archbishop of Diocaesarea : Vacant

== See also ==
- Anglican Bishop in Jerusalem
- Armenian Patriarchate of Jerusalem
- Palestinian Christians
- Eastern Orthodoxy in Jordan
- Christianity in Israel
- Pro-Jerusalem Society (1918–1926) – the Patriarch was a member of its leading Council
- Timeline of Jerusalem

== Sources ==
- Grillmeier, Aloys; Hainthaler, Theresia (2013). Christ in Christian Tradition: The Churches of Jerusalem and Antioch from 451 to 600. Vol. 2/3. Oxford: Oxford University Press. ISBN 978-0-19-921288-0.
- Meyendorff, John (1989). Imperial Unity and Christian Divisions: The Church 450–680 A.D. Crestwood, NY: St. Vladimir's Seminary Press. ISBN 9780881410563.
