= History of Athens =

Historical summary of Athens

Athens Ἀθῆναι
- Polis
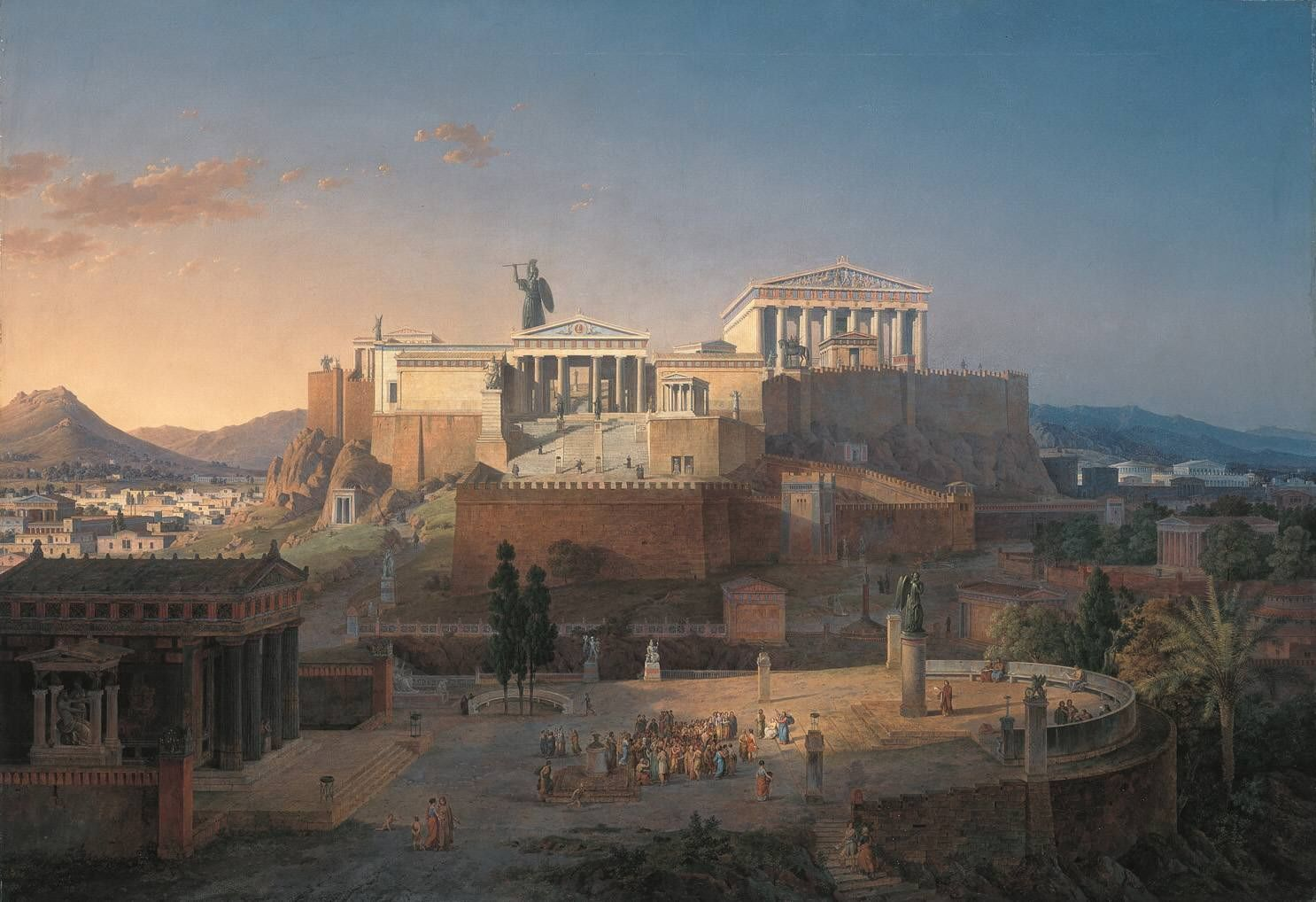
- Painting of an idealized reconstruction of the Acropolis and Areios Pagos in Athens, by Leo von Klenze (1846)

Historical affiliations
- Kingdom of Athens 1556 BC–1068 BC
- City-state of Athens 1068 BC–322 BC
- Hellenic League 338 BC–323 BC
- Hellenistic Athens 322 BC–86 BC
- Roman Republic 86 BC–27 BC
- Roman Empire 27 BC–395 AD
- Eastern Roman Empire 395–1205
- Duchy of Athens 1205–1458
- Ottoman Empire 1458–1822, 1826–1832
- Provisional Administration of Greece 1822–1826
- Kingdom of Greece 1832–1924, 1935–1941, 1944–1973
- Second Hellenic Republic 1924–1935
- Hellenic State 1941–1944
- Greek junta 1973–1974
- Third Hellenic Republic 1974–present

Athens is one of the oldest named cities in the world, having been continuously inhabited for perhaps 5,000 years. Situated in southern Europe, Athens became the leading city of ancient Greece in the first millennium BC, and its cultural achievements during the 5th century BC laid the foundations of Western civilization.

The earliest evidence for human habitation in Athens dates back to the Neolithic period. The Acropolis served as a fortified center during the Mycenaean era. By the 8th century BC, Athens had evolved into a prominent city-state, or polis, within the region of Attica. The 7th and 6th centuries BC saw the establishment of legal codes, such as those by Draco, Solon and Cleisthenes, which aimed to address social inequalities and set the stage for the development of democracy.

In the early 5th century BC, Athens played a central role in repelling Persian invasions and subsequently established its hegemony over other city-states through the formation of the Delian League. Under the leadership of Pericles, the city experienced a period of prosperity and cultural flourishing known as the Golden Age. This era saw the construction of significant architectural works, such as the Parthenon, and advancements in philosophy, drama, and the arts, establishing Athens as a center of classical civilization. The Peloponnesian War against Sparta ended in Athenian defeat and marked a decline in its political power. Nevertheless, under Hellenistic and Roman rule, Athens retained its status as a center of learning, attracting students and philosophers from across the empire.

During the early Middle Ages, the city experienced a decline, then recovered under the later Byzantine Empire and was relatively prosperous during the period of the Crusades (12th and 13th centuries), benefiting from Italian trade. Following a period of sharp decline under the rule of the Ottoman Empire, Athens re-emerged in the 19th century as the capital of the independent and self-governing Greek state.

== Name ==
The name of Athens, connected to the name of its patron goddess Athena, originates from an earlier Pre-Greek language. The origin myth explaining how Athens acquired this name through the legendary contest between Poseidon and Athena was described by Herodotus, Apollodorus, Ovid, Plutarch, Pausanias and others. It even became the theme of the sculpture on the west pediment of the Parthenon. Both Athena and Poseidon requested to be patrons of the city and to give their name to it, so they competed with offering the city one gift each. Poseidon produced a saltwater spring by striking the ground with his trident, symbolizing naval power.

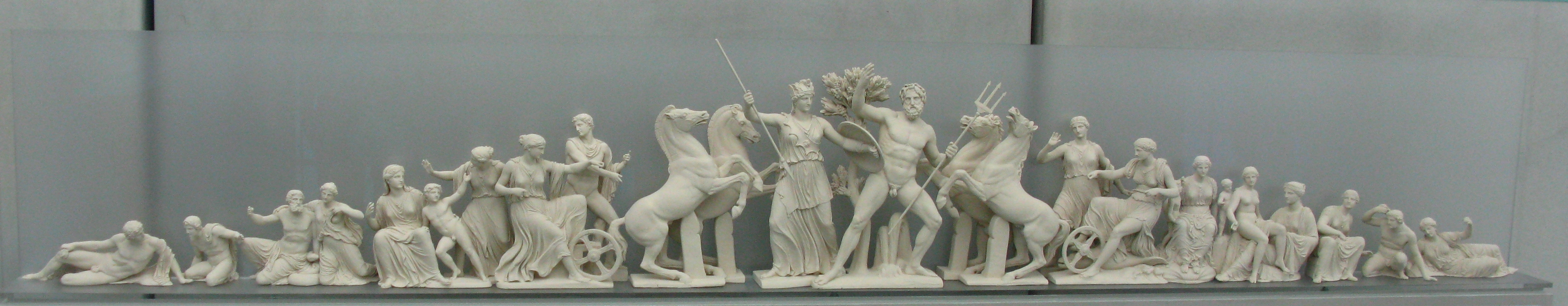
The contest of Athena and Poseidon, West Pediment of the Parthenon

Athena created the olive tree, symbolizing peace and prosperity. The Athenians, under their ruler Cecrops, accepted the olive tree and named the city after Athena. (Later the Southern Italian city of Paestum was founded under the name of Poseidonia at about 600 BC.) A sacred olive tree said to be the one created by the goddess was still kept on the Acropolis at the time of Pausanias (2nd century AD). It was located by the temple of Pandrosus, next to the Parthenon. According to Herodotus, the tree had been burnt down during the Persian Wars, but a shoot sprung from the stump. The Greeks saw this as a symbol that Athena still had her mark there on the city.

Plato, in his dialogue Cratylus, offers an etymology of Athena's name connecting it to the phrase ἁ θεονόα or hē theoû nóēsis (ἡ θεοῦ νόησις, 'the mind of god').

== Geographical setting ==
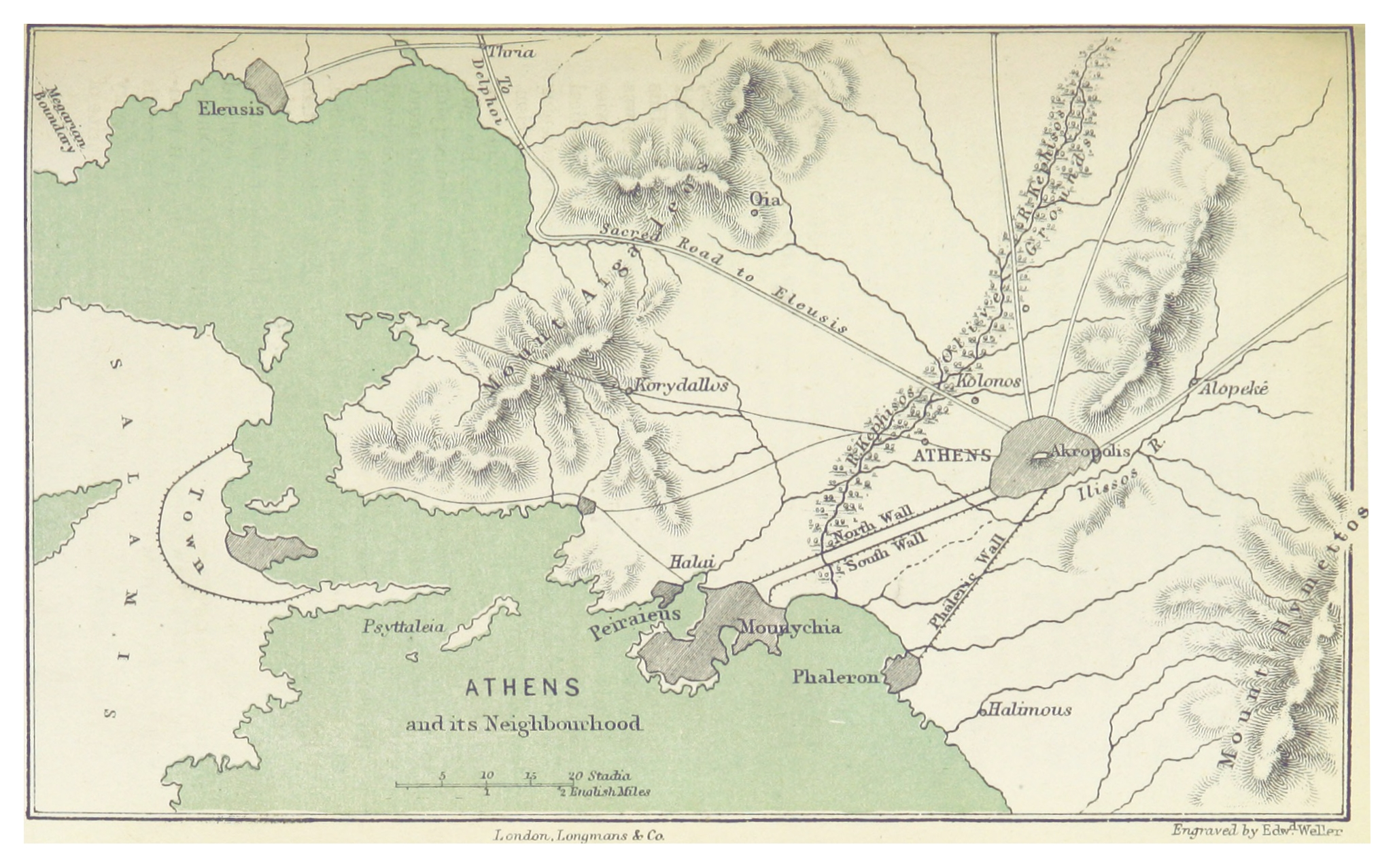
Map of the Environs of Ancient Athens

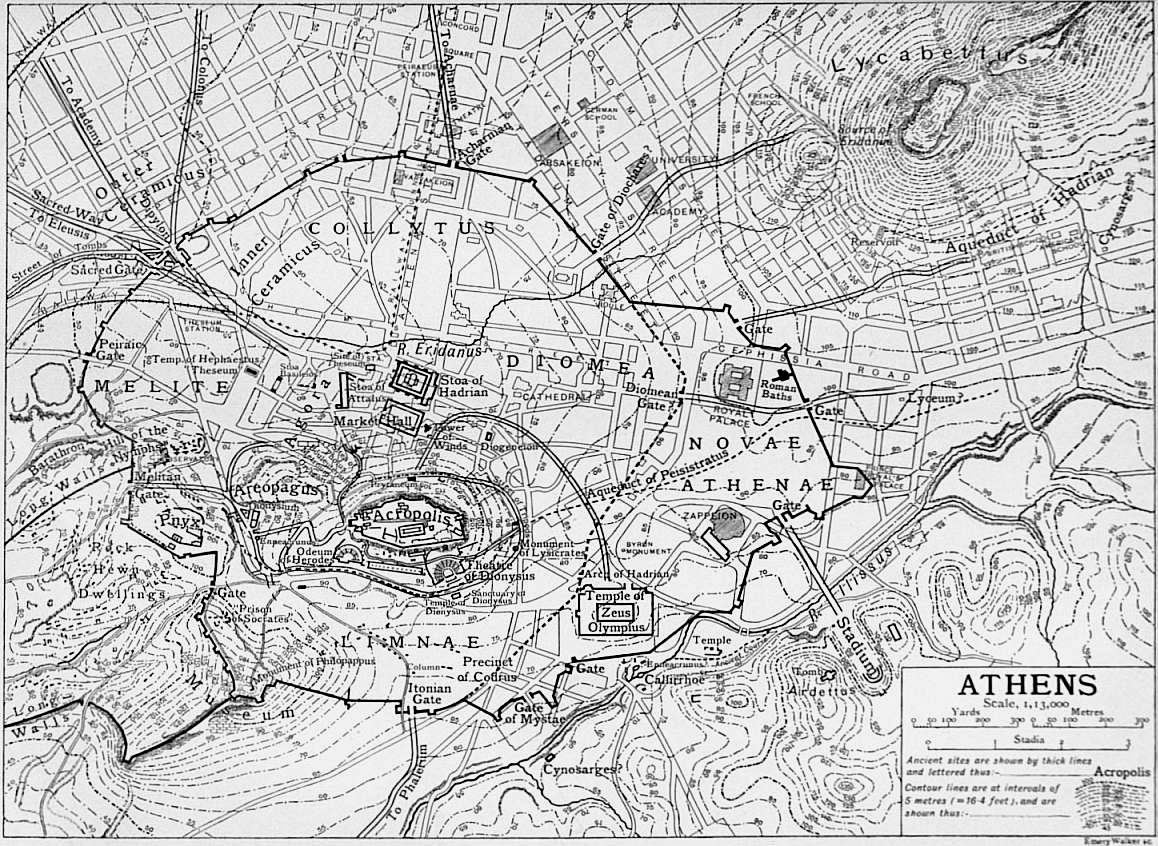
1911 map of Athens

There is evidence that the site on which the Acropolis ('high city') stands was first inhabited in the Neolithic period, perhaps as a defensible settlement, around the end of the fourth millennium BC or a little later. The site is a natural defensive position which commands the surrounding plains. It is located about 20 km (12 mi) inland from the Saronic Gulf, in the centre of the Cephisian Plain, a fertile valley surrounded by rivers. To the east lies Mount Hymettus, to the north Mount Pentelicus. Ancient Athens, in the first millennium BC, occupied a very small area compared to the sprawling metropolis of modern Greece. The ancient walled city encompassed an area measuring about two kilometres (1.5 mi) from east to west and slightly less than that from north to south, although at its peak the ancient city had suburbs extending well beyond these walls. The Acropolis was situated just south of the centre of this walled area.

The Agora, the commercial and social centre of the city, lay about 400 m (1,300 ft) north of the Acropolis, in what is now the Monastiraki district. The hill of the Pnyx, where the Athenian Assembly met, lay at the western end of the city. The Eridanus (Ηριδανός) river flowed through the city.

One of the most important religious sites in ancient Athens was the Temple of Athena, known today as the Parthenon, which stood on top of the Acropolis, where its evocative ruins still stand. Two other major religious sites, the Temple of Hephaestus (which is still largely intact) and the Temple of Olympian Zeus or Olympeion (once the largest temple in mainland Greece but now in ruins), also lay within the city walls.

== Neolithic ==
Athens has been inhabited from Neolithic times, possibly from the end of the fourth millennium BC, or over 5,000 years.

== Late Bronze Age ==
In the Late Bronze Age (c. 1600/1550-1200/1150 BCE), Athens emerged as one of the main centers of Mycenaean culture.

By 1412 BC, the settlement had become an important center of the Mycenaean civilization and the Acropolis was the site of a major Mycenaean fortress whose remains can be recognised from sections of the characteristic Cyclopean walls. On the summit of the Acropolis, below the later Erechtheion, cuttings in the rock have been identified as the location of a Mycenaean palace. Between 1250 and 1200 BC, to feed the needs of the Mycenaean settlement, a staircase was built down a cleft in the rock to reach a water supply that was protected from enemy incursions, comparable to similar works carried out at Mycenae.

Fortified settlement. In Late Helladic III (LH III), Athens evolved from a regional settlement into a fortified Mycenaean palatial center. By LH IIIB (c. 1250 BCE), Athens had a massive fortification system with walls built of "Cyclopean" stones - similar to those found at Mycenae and Tiryns. The wall was roughly 4.5-6 m thick, built using massive unworked limestone blocks with a core of rubble and earth. The wall enclosed the entire acropolis with the main gate on the west side and a smaller postern gate to the northeast (Iakovidis, 1962).

Megaron Palace. Much of the Mycenaean layer was destroyed by later 5th-century BCE construction (the Parthenon and Erectheion). Structural remnants confirm the existence of a Megaron Palace. South the Erectheion there are two column bases identified as belonging to this palace. This implies a centralized bureaucracy managed by a wanax (king), supported by a military elite. There are also "Warrior Graves" found in the nearby Areopagus and Agora regions, containing bronze weaponry and prestige goods (Montjoy, 1995).

Unlike Mycenae, Pylos, or Tiryns, there is no archaeological evidence of a catastrophic fire or violent destruction at the Athens Acropolis during the transition from LH IIIB to LH IIIC. It is unclear whether Athens suffered destruction in about 1200 BC, an event traditionally attributed to a Dorian invasion (though now commonly attributed to a systems collapse, part of the Late Bronze Age collapse). The Athenians always maintained that they were 'pure' Ionians with no Dorian element. However, Athens, like many other Bronze Age settlements, went into economic decline for around 150 years following this.

== Iron Age ==
=== Iron I ===
Iron I (1200/1150-950 BCE) represents the post-palatial Submycenaean period, Late Helladic IIIC (LH IIIC), or the Greek Dark Ages. While the Bronze Age Collapse triggered abrupt end and abandonment for many Mycenaean centers, evidence at Athens show a more gradual transition into the next phase. Athens appears to have been a "refugee" center. The Kerameikos cemetery shows a transition from Mycenaean chamber tombs to individual cist graves, suggesting a shift in social structure rather than a total societal wipeout (Snodgrass, 1971).

At the end of the Late Bronze Age, climate change (drought) and political turmoil caused many city-states to collapse. At Athens, in the late 13th century BCE and early 12th century BCE, there was intense building activity to withstand a siege. Apparently, Athens successfully withstood this period of turmoil as there are no burnt layer or signs of siege warfare leading to breaches in the city fortifications.

==== Late Helladic IIIC1 ====
The Northeast Postern Gate. During LH IIIB/C, the small secondary entrance to the Acropolis was blocked with massive masonry. This is a classic archaeological indicator of a high-threat environment where the defenders prioritized security over accessibility (Iakovidis, 1962).

The Fountain House (Northwest Descent). The secret fountain as evidence for siege preparation. A deep shaft was cut 35 m down through the rock to reach a natural spring at the northwest descent. This is one of the most significant engineering feats of the LBA. It featured a series of wooden stairs supported by ceramic and stone sockets. Carbon-14 and ceramic dating of the pottery in the shaft (LH IIIC Early) prove it was constructed in a hurry and used for a short period (25-30 years) before collapsing. The fact that it was used for less than a generation suggests a period of acute, localized crisis. Once the immediate threat of a prolonged blockade passed, the risky, deep-access shaft was abandoned (Gauß, 2003).

==== Late Helladic IIIC2-3 ====
Following the peak tension of the early 12th century BCE, the settlement pattern shifted to the slopes of the acropolis. Analysis of pottery shards and foundation remains, shows a "de-palatialization" of the city. While the walls remained, the formal administrative functions of the palace likely dissolved. The elite no longer lived exclusively atop the rock in a centralized palace structure. Excavations by the American School (ASCSA) revealed a cluster of houses on the North Slope of the Acropolis dating to LH IIIC. These were simpler, multi-roomed dwellings built over earlier Mycenaean remains. Below the citadel, the area that would later become the Classical Agora saw an increase in domestic activity. This indicates a transition from a "citadel-and-subject" model to a more integrated, proto-urban community living on the slopes and in the valley (Mountjoy, 1995).

=== Iron II ===
Iron Age burials, in the Kerameikos and other locations, are often richly provided for and demonstrate that from 900 BC onwards Athens was one of the leading centres of trade and prosperity in the region; as were Lefkandi in Euboea and Knossos in Crete. This position may well have resulted from its central location in the Greek world, its secure stronghold on the Acropolis and its access to the sea, which gave it a natural advantage over inland rivals such as Thebes and Sparta.

=== Founding myths ===
According to legend, Athens was formerly ruled by kings, a situation which may have continued up until the 9th century BC. From later accounts, it is believed that these kings stood at the head of a land-owning aristocracy known as the Eupatridae (the 'well-born'), whose instrument of government was a Council which met on the Hill of Ares, called the Areopagus and appointed the chief city officials, the archons and the polemarch (commander-in-chief). The most famous king of Athens was Theseus, a prominent figure in Greek Mythology who killed the Minotaur.

A slightly different mythical version of Athens' past is given in Plato's dialogue Timaeus. In this dialogue, a story is told about information given to Athenian leader Solon from Egyptian priests of the goddess Neith while he visited Egypt, according to which a well advanced Athenian state was established 9,000 years prior to his time that preceded Egypt's oldest kingdom by a thousand years. The laws of that state were the most just and largely inspired the various kings of Egypt when making laws for their kingdom. This story is not supported by any scholarly evidence, as no Athenian state is known to have existed during the 10th millennium BC. In addition, no evidence exists of any possible cultural or other ties between Egypt and any part of present-day Greece at such early a date. If the "9,000" was an error for "900", then it would fit better with the LBA city around 1550-1450 BCE - a time when the Mycenaeans started to dominate the Aegean.

=== Archaic period ===
Didrachm of Athens, 545–510 BC
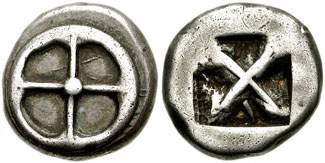
First side of the image: Obv: Four-spoked wheel
Second side of the image: Rev: Incuse square, divided diagonally
Silver didrachm of Athens of heraldic type from the time of Peisistratus, 545–510 BC
Obol of Athens, 545–525 BC
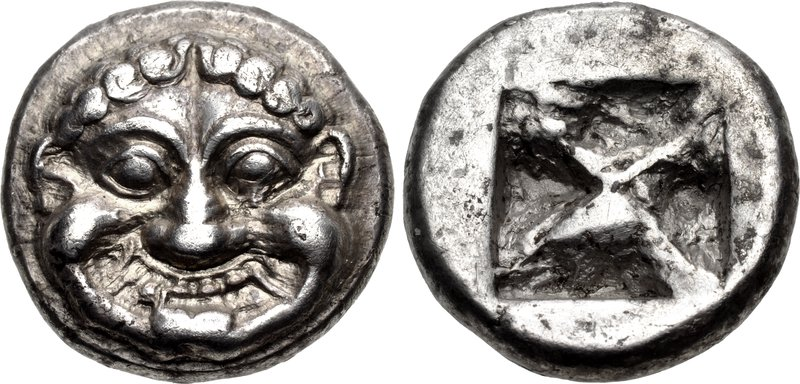
First side of the image: Obv: A Gorgoneion
Second side of the image: Rev: Square incuse
An archaic silver obol of Athens of heraldic type from the time of Peisistratus, 545–525 BC

During the 1st millennium BC, Athens succeeded in bringing the other towns of Attica under its rule. This process of synoikismos – the bringing together into one home – created the largest and wealthiest state on the Greek mainland, but it also created a larger class of people excluded from political life by the nobility. By the 7th century BC, social unrest had become widespread, and the Areopagus appointed Draco to draft a strict new code of law (hence the word 'draconian'). When this failed, they appointed Solon with a mandate to create a new constitution in 594 BC.

The reforms that Solon initiated dealt with both political and economic issues. The economic power of the Eupatridae was reduced by forbidding the enslavement of Athenian citizens as a punishment for debt (debt bondage), by breaking up large landed estates and freeing up trade and commerce, which allowed the emergence of a prosperous urban trading class. Politically, Solon divided the Athenians into four classes, based on their wealth and their ability to perform military service. The poorest class, the Thetai, (Ancient Greek Θήται) who formed the majority of the population, received political rights for the first time and were able to vote in the Ecclesia (Assembly). But only the upper classes could hold political office. The Areopagus continued to exist but its powers were reduced.

The new system laid the foundations for what eventually became Athenian democracy, but in the short term, it failed to quell class conflict, and after twenty years of unrest, the popular party, led by Peisistratos, seized power. Peisistratos is usually called a tyrant, but the Greek word tyrannos does not mean a cruel and despotic ruler, merely one who took power by force. Peisistratos was in fact a very popular ruler, who made Athens wealthy, powerful, and a centre of culture. He preserved the Solonian Constitution, but made sure that he and his family held all the offices of state.

Peisistratus built the first aqueduct tunnel at Athens, which most likely had its sources on the slopes of Mount Hymettos and along the Ilissos river. It supplied, among other structures, the fountain house in the southeast corner of the Agora, but it had a number of branches. In the 4th century BC it was replaced by a system of terracotta pipes in a stone-built underground channel, sometimes called the Hymettos aqueduct; many sections had round, oval or square access holes on top of about 10 cm × 10 cm (4 in × 4 in). Pipe segments of this system are displayed at the Evangelismos and Syntagma Metro stations.

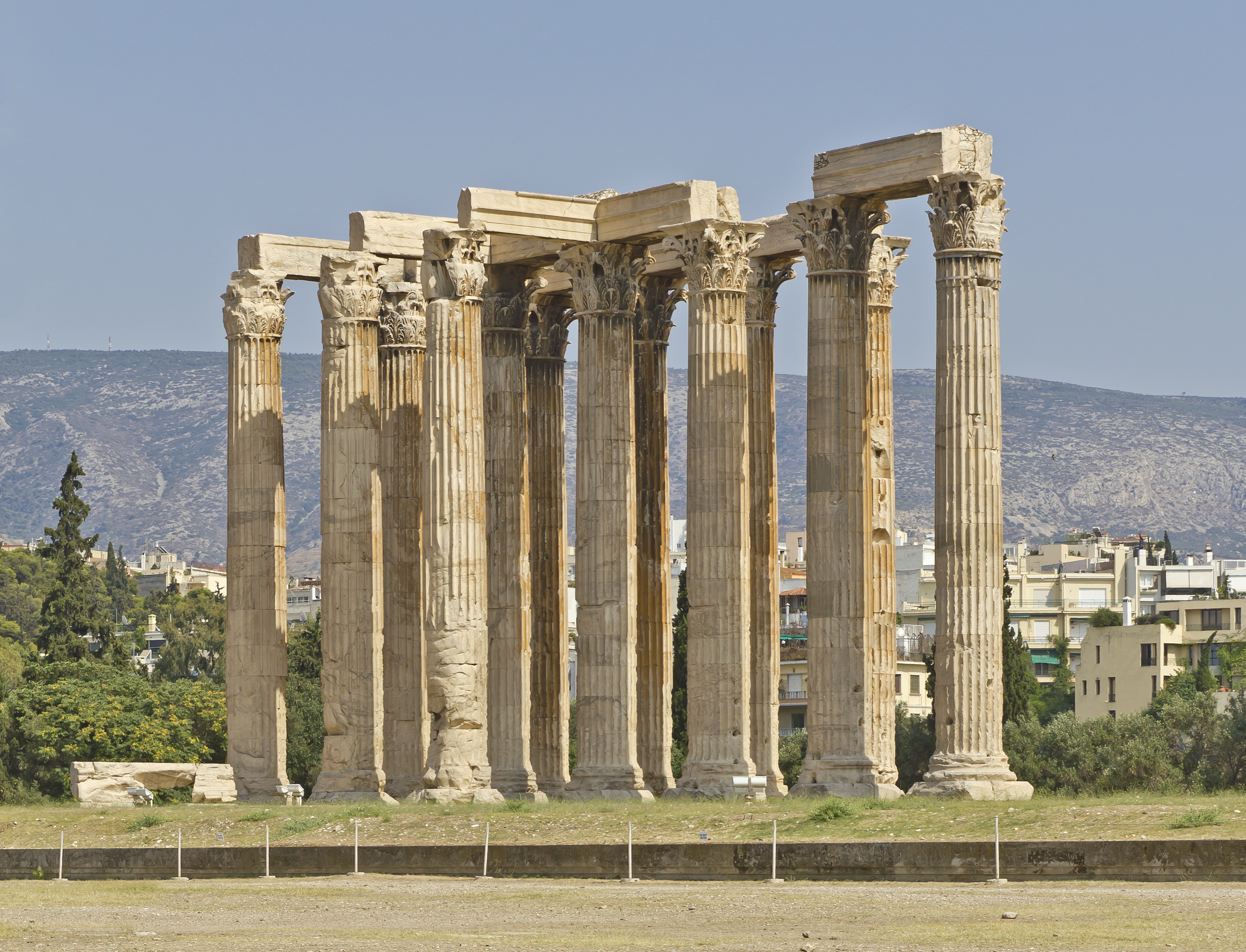
The ruins of the Temple of Olympian Zeus, conceived by the sons of Peisistratus

Peisistratos died in 527 BC and was succeeded by his sons Hippias and Hipparchus. They proved to be much less adept rulers and in 514 BC, Hipparchus was assassinated in a private dispute over a young man (see Harmodius and Aristogeiton). This led Hippias to establish a real dictatorship, which proved very unpopular. He was overthrown in 510 BC. A radical politician with an aristocratic background named Cleisthenes then took charge, and it was he who established democracy in Athens.

The reforms of Cleisthenes replaced the traditional four phyle ('tribes') with ten new ones, named after legendary heroes and having no class basis; they were in fact electorates. Each phyle was in turn divided into three trittyes and each trittys had one or more demes, which became the basis of local government. The phyle each elected fifty members to the Boule, a council which governed Athens on a day-to-day basis. The Assembly was open to all citizens and was both a legislature and a supreme court, except in murder cases and religious matters, which became the only remaining functions of the Areopagus.

Most public offices were filled by lot, although the ten strategoi (generals) were elected. This system remained remarkably stable and, with a few brief interruptions, it remained in place for 170 years, until Philip II of Macedon defeated Athens and Thebes at the Battle of Chaeronea in 338 BC.

== Classical Athens ==
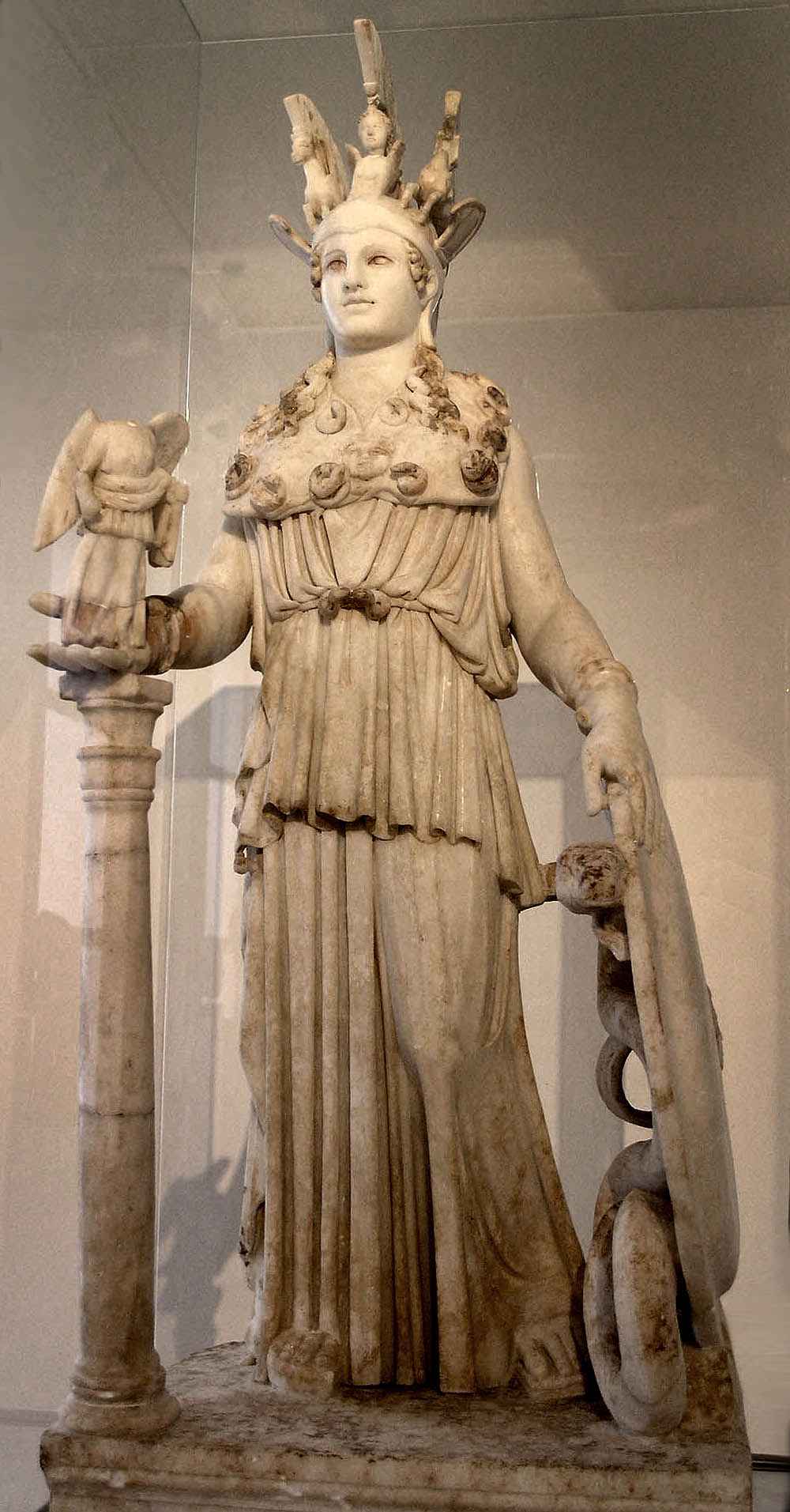
Roman statuette of Athena, copy of the Phidias statue, created for the Parthenon in 447 BC, National Archaeological Museum, Athens

=== Greco–Persian Wars ===
Before the rise of Athens, Sparta considered itself to be the leader (or hegemon) of the Greeks. In 499 BC, Athens sent a small force to support the Ionian Greeks of Asia Minor in their revolt against Persian rule. This intervention contributed to the outbreak of two Persian invasions of mainland Greece. The first occurred in 490 BC, when Persian forces under Darius I landed at Marathon. There, an Athenian army led by the soldier-statesman Miltiades repelled the invaders in a significant victory.

A second and much larger invasion was launched in 480 BC by Darius's successor, Xerxes I. In the years leading up to the war, Athenian statesman Themistocles had persuaded the Athenian assembly that the revenues from newly discovered silver mines at Laurion should be used not for individual distribution, but for the construction of warships—an investment that would prove decisive in the conflict. After a Spartan-led defensive force was defeated at Thermopylae, the Persian army advanced into central Greece and invaded Attica. Under the leadership of Themistocles, the population of Athens had by then been evacuated to the Peloponnesian city of Troezen. Soon after, Persian forces captured the deserted city and set fire to the buildings on the Acropolis.

Later that year, an Athenian-led fleet engaged the Persians at the Battle of Salamis. Exploiting the constricted geography of the straits near Salamis Island, the smaller and more agile Greek ships were able to inflict substantial losses on the larger Persian fleet. Following this defeat, Xerxes withdrew most of his forces to Asia, leaving a contingent in Greece under his general Mardonius. In 479 BC, this remaining army was defeated at the Battle of Plataea by a coalition of Greek city-states.

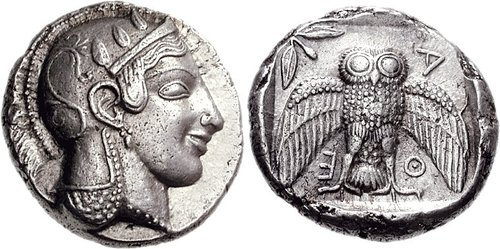
Athenian decadrachm, 467–465 BC: Head of Athena wearing crested Attic helmet. Rev: Owl standing facing, ΑΘΕ (ΑΘΗΝΑΙΩΝ – of Athenians). Commemorative issue, representing the Athenian military domination.

Following the war, Athens shifted from a regional power to a political and military force of wider consequence. It led the formation of the Delian League—an alliance forged to continue the war against Persia—which would soon evolve into the foundation of Athenian imperial influence across the Aegean. At this time, Athens began its ascent as a maritime and cultural power, laying the groundwork for what would become its classical golden age.

=== Golden Age ===
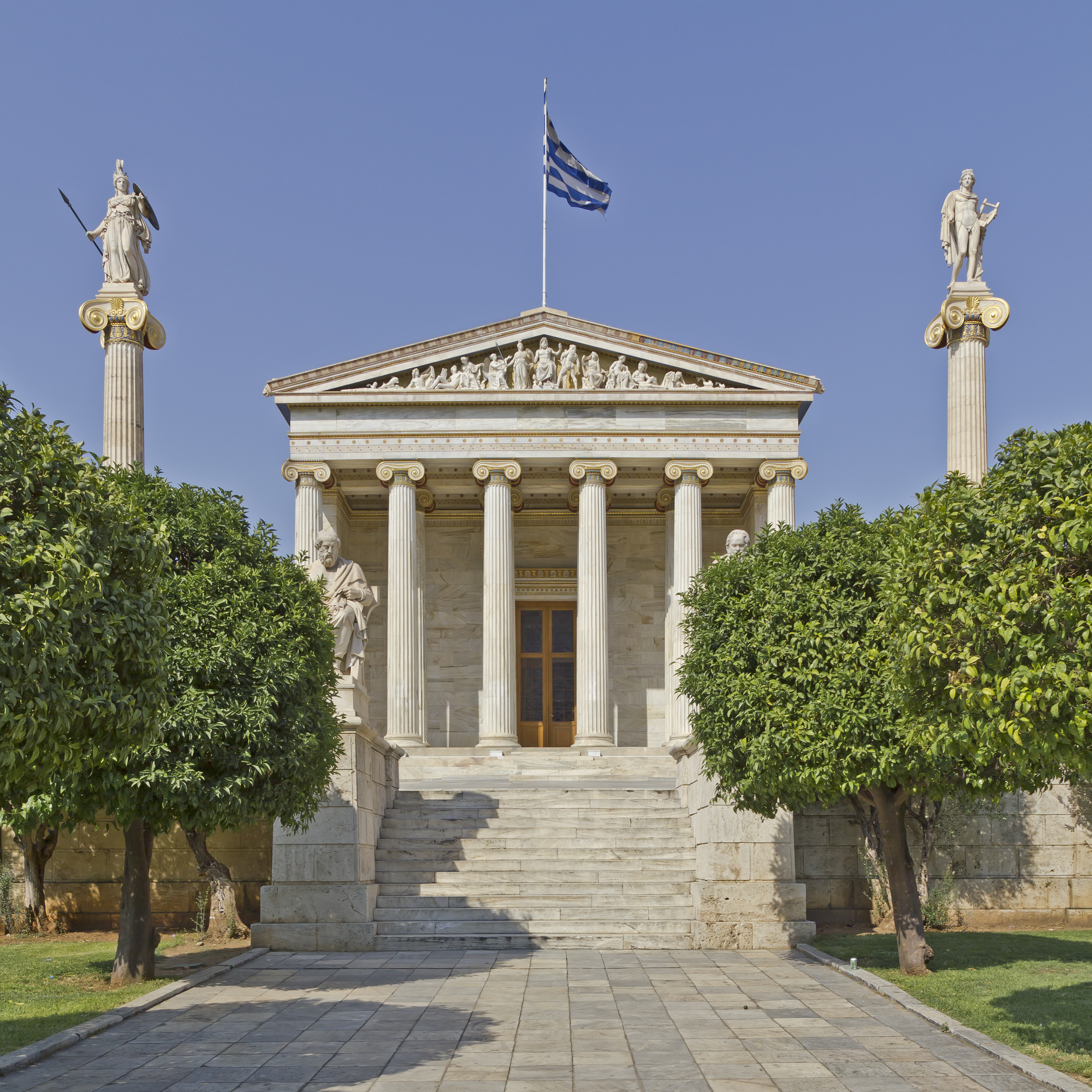
The modern Academy of Athens, with Apollo and Athena on their columns, and Socrates and Plato seated in front

The period from the end of the Persian Wars to the Macedonian conquest marked the zenith of Athens as a center of literature, philosophy, and the arts. In Athens at this time, the political satire of the Comic poets at the theatres had a remarkable influence on public opinion.

Some of the most important figures of Western cultural and intellectual history lived in Athens during this period: the dramatists Aeschylus, Sophocles, Euripides and Aristophanes, the physician Hippocrates, the philosophers Socrates, Plato and Aristotle, the historians Herodotus, Thucydides and Xenophon, the poet Simonides, the orators Antiphon, Isocrates, Aeschines, and Demosthenes, and the sculptor Phidias. The leading statesman of the mid-fifth century BC was Pericles, who used the tribute paid by the members of the Delian League to build the Parthenon and other great monuments of classical Athens. The city became, in Pericles's words, "the school of Hellas [Greece]."

=== Peloponnesian War ===
The resentment felt by other cities at the hegemony of Athens led to the Peloponnesian War, which began in 431 BC and pitted Athens and its increasingly rebellious overseas empire against a coalition of land-based states led by Sparta. The conflict was a drawn out one that saw Sparta control the land while Athens was dominant at sea, however the disastrous Sicilian Expedition severely weakened Athens and the war eventually ended in an Athenian defeat following the Battle of Aegospotami which ended Athenian naval supremacy.

==== Athenian coup of 411 BC ====
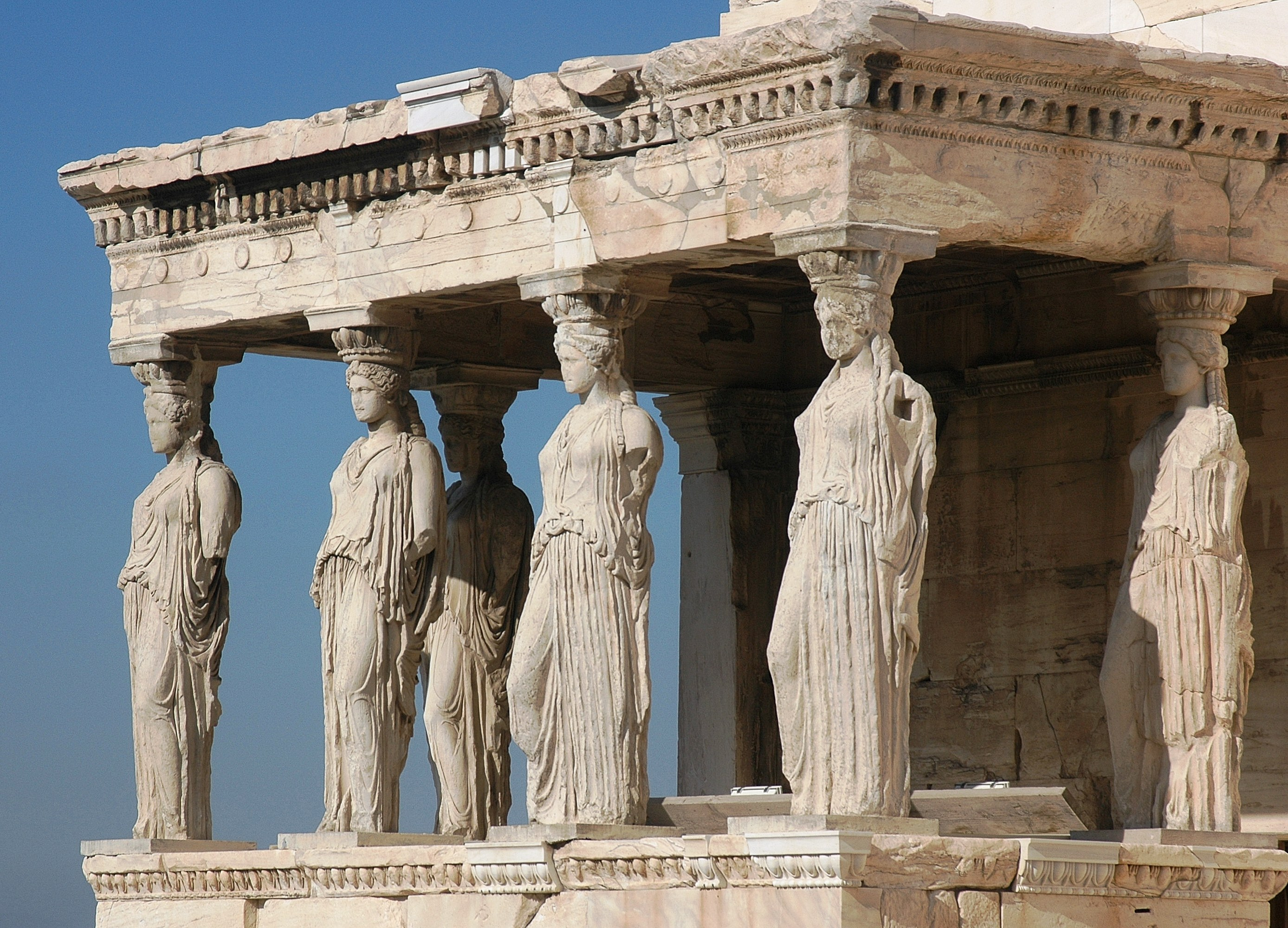
The Karyatides statues of the Erechtheion, constructed 421–406 BC on the Acropolis

Due to its poor handling of the war, the democracy in Athens was briefly overthrown by a coup in 411 BC; however, it was quickly restored. The Peloponnesian War ended in 404 BC with the complete defeat of Athens. Since the loss of the war was largely blamed on democratic politicians such as Cleon and Cleophon, there was a brief reaction against democracy, aided by the Spartan army (the rule of the Thirty Tyrants). In 403 BC, however, democracy was restored by Thrasybulus and an amnesty was declared.

=== Corinthian War and the Second Athenian League ===
Sparta's former allies soon turned against her, due to her imperialist policy, and soon Athens' former enemies Thebes and Corinth had become her allies; they fought with Athens and Argos against Sparta in the indecisive Corinthian War (395 – 387 BC). Opposition to Sparta enabled Athens to establish a Second Athenian League.

Finally Thebes defeated Sparta in 371 BC in the Battle of Leuctra. But then the Greek cities (including Athens and Sparta) turned against Thebes, whose dominance was stopped at the Battle of Mantinea (362 BC) with the death of its military-genius leader Epaminondas.

=== Rise of Macedon ===
By the mid-4th century BC, however, the northern Greek kingdom of Macedon was becoming dominant in Athenian affairs. In the Battle of Chaeronea (338 BC), Philip II's armies defeated an alliance of some of the Greek city-states including Athens and Thebes, forcing them into a confederation and effectively limiting Athenian independence. Philippides of Paiania, one of the wealthiest Athenian aristocratic oligarchs, campaigned for Philip II during the Battle of Chaeronea and proposed in the Assembly decrees honoring Alexander the Great for the Macedonian victory. Philippides was prosecuted in trial by Hypereides, who detested his pro-Macedonian sympathies. Subsequently, the conquests of Alexander the Great widened Greek horizons and made the traditional Greek city state obsolete. Athens remained a wealthy city with a brilliant cultural life, but ceased to be a leading power. The period following the death of Alexander in 323 BC is known as Hellenistic Greece.

== Hellenistic period ==
Shortly after the death of Alexander the Great, Antipater and Craterus became joint generals of Greece and Macedonia. Athens joined Aetolia and Thessaly in facing their power, known as the Lamian War. Craterus fell in a battle against Eumenes in 320 BC, leaving Antipater alone to rule for a year, until his death in 319 BC. Athens had a central role in the struggle for his succession, when Antipater's son, Cassander, secured the Piraeus leaving Athens without a source of supplies, to contest Antipater's successor, Polyperchon. To consolidate power against Cassander, Polyperchon restored Athens's democracy, as it was before the Lamian War. However, after losing the fleet one year prior, Polyperchon had to flee Macedon when in 316 BC Cassander secured control of Athens. Cassander appointed Demetrius of Phalerum as head of the administration of Athens. Demetrius remained in power until 307 BC when Cassander's enemy, Demetrius Poliorcetes captured Athens, and Macedon, ending the short-lived Antipatrid dynasty and installing his own.

=== Athens and the rise of the Roman empire ===
After the Pyrrhic War (280–275 BC) Rome asserted its hegemony over Magna Graecia and became increasingly involved in Greece and the Balkans peninsula. The First Macedonian War (214–205 BC) between the Roman Republic and the Kingdom of Macedon ended with the Treaty of Phoenice. During the Second Macedonian War (200–197), the Romans declared "the freedom of Greece" from the Macedonian Kings. Athens allied with Rome in that war but Livy said of Athens efforts that "words are the only weapons that the Athenians have left.

The Roman–Seleucid War (192–188) ended with the Peace of Apamea, and the Third Macedonian War (171–168), after which Macedonian territory was divided into four client republics and Macedonia was formally annexed to the Roman Republic after the Fourth Macedonian War (150–148). The Achaean League was defeated and dissolved by the Romans in the Achaean War in 146. Greece was divided into the Roman provinces of Macedonia and Achaea; thus, Athens came under Roman rule.

== Roman period ==
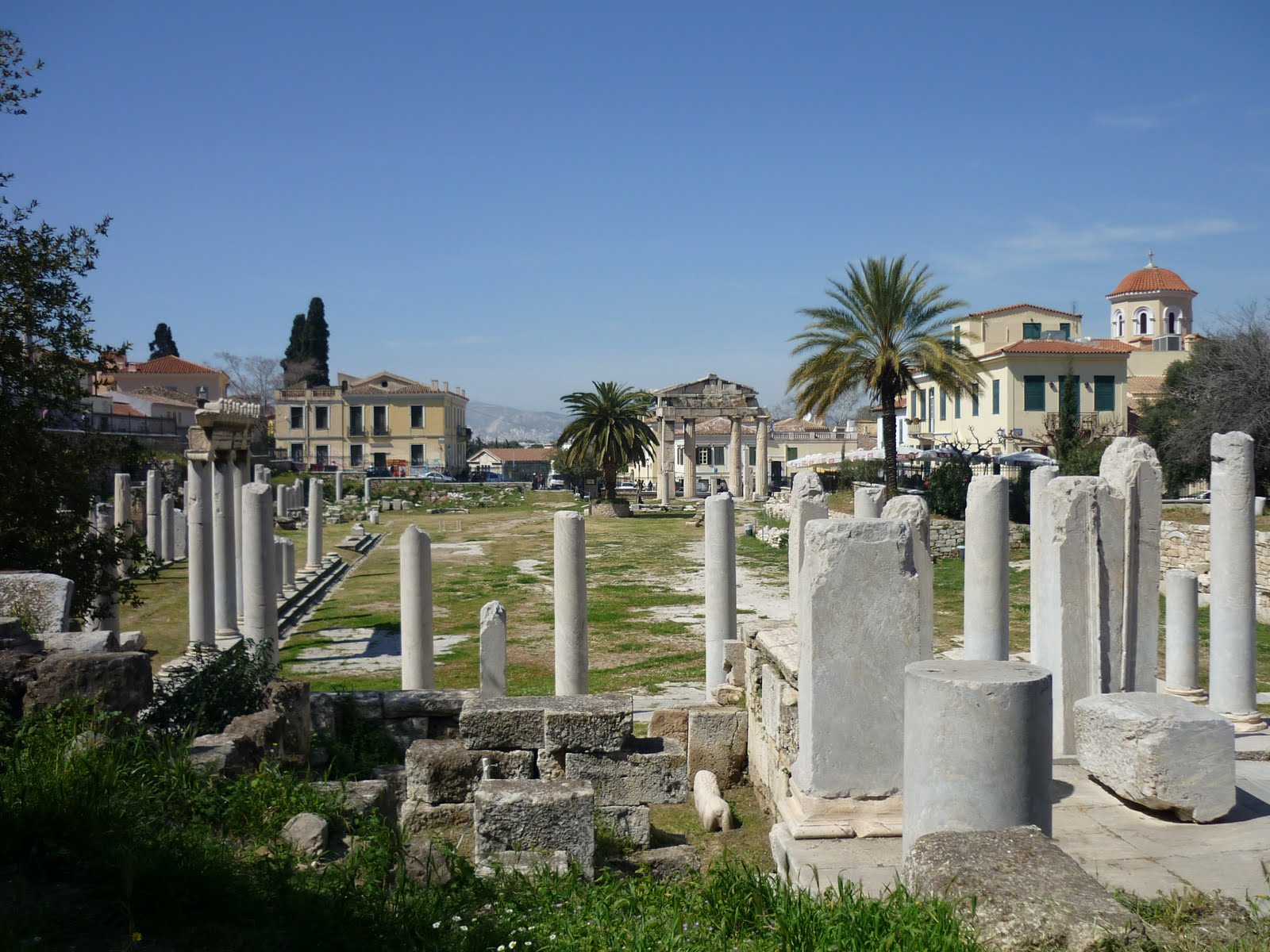
The ruins of the Roman Agora, the second commercial centre of ancient Athens

During the First Mithridatic War, Athens was ruled by Aristion, a tyrant installed by Mithridates VI. In 88–85 BC, most Athenian fortifications and homes were leveled by the Roman general Sulla after the Siege of Athens and Piraeus, although many civic buildings and monuments were left intact. The Macedonian astronomer Andronicus of Cyrrhus subsequently designed the Tower of the Winds for the Roman forum, which mostly survives to the present day. Under Roman rule, Athens was given the status of a free city because of its widely admired schools.

The Roman emperor Hadrian (r. 117–138 AD), constructed a large number of civic buildings.

The city was sacked in 267 AD, resulting in the burning of all the public buildings, and the city to the north of the Acropolis was hastily refortified. Athens remained a centre of learning and philosophy during its 500 years of Roman rule, patronized by emperors such as Nero and Hadrian.

== Late Antiquity ==
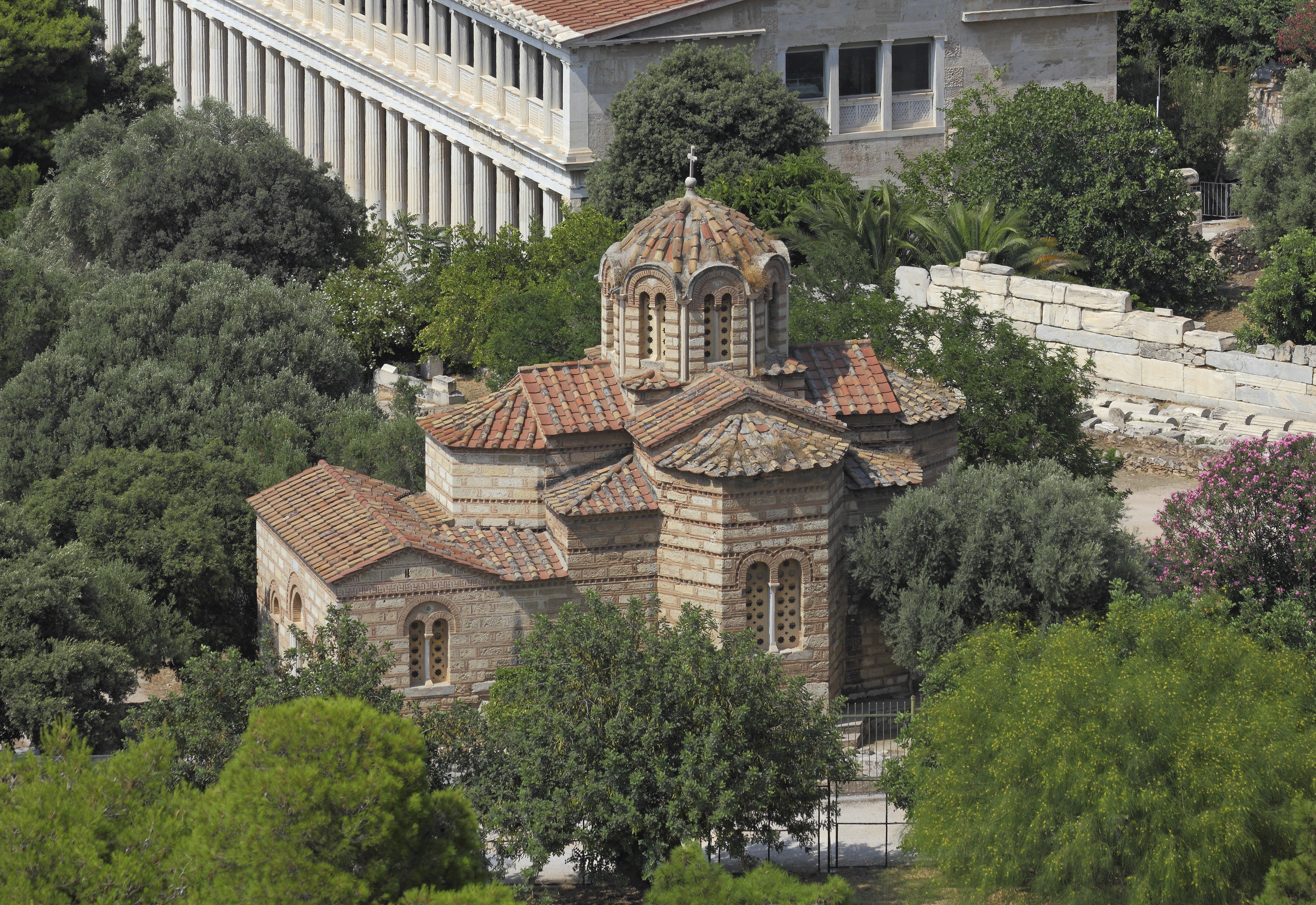
The Byzantine Church of the Holy Apostles next to the Stoa of Attalos

In the early 4th century AD, the eastern Roman empire began to be governed from Constantinople, and with the construction and expansion of the imperial city, many of Athens's works of art were taken by the emperors to adorn it. The Empire became Christianized, and the use of Latin declined in favour of exclusive use of Greek; in the Roman imperial period, both languages had been used. In the later Roman period, Athens was ruled by the emperors continuing until the 13th century, its citizens identifying themselves as citizens of the Roman Empire ("Rhomaioi"). The conversion of the empire from paganism to Christianity greatly affected Athens, resulting in reduced reverence for the city. Ancient monuments such as the Parthenon, Erechtheion and the Hephaisteion (Theseion) were converted into churches. As the empire became increasingly anti-pagan, Athens became a provincial town and experienced fluctuating fortunes.

The city remained an important center of learning, especially of Neoplatonism—with notable pupils including Gregory of Nazianzus, Basil of Caesarea and emperor Julian (r. 355–363)—and consequently a center of paganism. Christian items do not appear in the archaeological record until the early 5th century. The sack of the city by the Herules in 267 and by the Visigoths under their king Alaric I (r. 395–410) in 396, however, dealt a heavy blow to the city's fabric and fortunes, and Athens was henceforth confined to a small fortified area that embraced a fraction of the ancient city. The emperor Justinian I (r. 527–565) banned the teaching of philosophy by pagans in 529, an event whose impact on the city is much debated, but is generally taken to mark the end of the ancient history of Athens. Athens was sacked by the Slavs in 582, but remained in imperial hands thereafter, as highlighted by the visit of the emperor Constans II (r. 641–668) in 662/3 and its inclusion in the Theme of Hellas.

== Middle Ages ==
=== Byzantine Athens ===
The city was threatened by Saracen raids in the 8th–9th centuries—in 896, Athens was raided and possibly occupied for a short period, an event which left some archaeological remains and elements of Arabic ornamentation in contemporary buildings—but there is also evidence of a mosque existing in the city at the time. In the great dispute over Byzantine Iconoclasm, Athens is commonly held to have supported the iconophile position, chiefly due to the role played by Empress Irene of Athens in the ending of the first period of Iconoclasm at the Second Council of Nicaea in 787. A few years later, another Athenian, Theophano, became empress as the wife of Staurakios (r. 811–812).

Invasion of the empire by the Turks after the Battle of Manzikert in 1071, and the ensuing civil wars, largely passed the region by and Athens continued its provincial existence unharmed. When the Byzantine Empire was rescued by the resolute leadership of the three Komnenos emperors Alexios, John and Manuel, Attica and the rest of Greece prospered. Archaeological evidence tells us that the medieval town experienced a period of rapid and sustained growth, starting in the 11th century and continuing until the end of the 12th century.

The agora or marketplace, which had been deserted since late antiquity, began to be built over, and soon the town became an important centre for the production of soaps and dyes. The growth of the town attracted the Venetians, and various other traders who frequented the ports of the Aegean, to Athens. This interest in trade appears to have further increased the economic prosperity of the town.

The 11th and 12th centuries were the Golden Age of Byzantine art in Athens. Almost all of the most important Middle Byzantine churches in and around Athens were built during these two centuries, and this reflects the growth of the town in general. However, this medieval prosperity was not to last. In 1204, the Fourth Crusade conquered Athens and the city was not recovered from the Latins before it was taken by the Ottoman Turks. It did not become Greek in government again until the 19th century.

=== Latin Athens ===
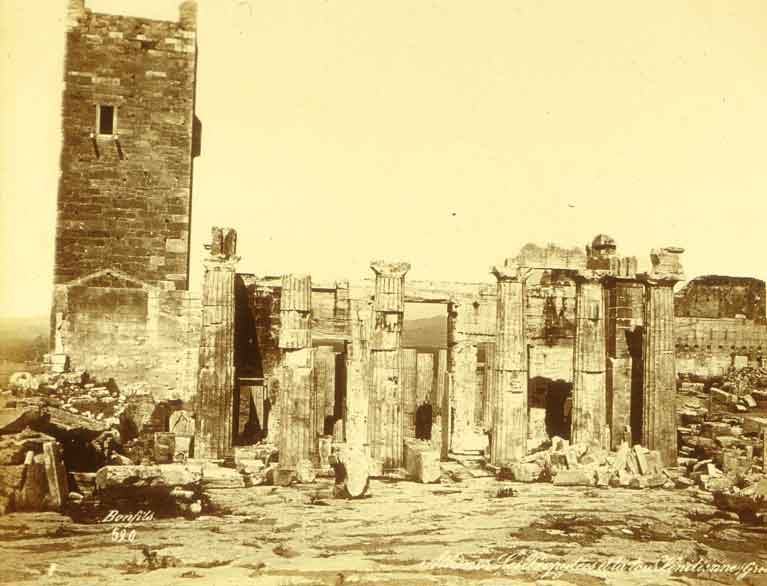
The Propylaea on the Acropolis of Athens (pictured with the now demolished Frankish Tower in the mid-19th century) were the palace of the Dukes of Athens.

From 1204 until 1458, Athens was ruled by Latins in three separate periods, following the Crusades. The "Latins", or "Franks", were western Europeans and followers of the Latin Church brought to the Eastern Mediterranean during the Crusades. Along with rest of Byzantine Greece, Athens was part of the series of feudal fiefs, similar to the Crusader states established in Syria and on Cyprus after the First Crusade. This period is known as the Frankokratia.

==== Burgundian period ====
Athens was initially the capital of the eponymous Duchy of Athens, a fief of the Latin Empire which replaced the Byzantine Empire, ruling from Constantinople. After Thebes became a possession of the Latin dukes, which were of the Burgundian family called De la Roche, it replaced Athens as the capital and seat of government, although Athens remained the most influential ecclesiastical centre in the duchy and site of a prime fortress.

Under the Burgundian dukes, a bell tower was added to the Parthenon, known as the Frankish Tower. The Burgundians brought chivalry and tournaments to Athens; they also fortified the Acropolis. They were themselves influenced by Byzantine Greek culture.

==== Catalan period ====
In 1311, Athens was conquered by the Catalan Company, a band of mercenaries called Almogavars. It was held by the Catalans until 1388. After 1379, when Thebes was lost, Athens became the capital of the duchy again.

Athens, called Cetines (rarely Athenes) by the conquerors, was a veguería with its own castellan, captain, and veguer.

==== Florentine period ====
In 1388, the Florentine Nerio I Acciajuoli took the city and made himself duke. The Florentines had to dispute the city with the Republic of Venice, but they ultimately emerged victorious after seven years of Venetian rule (1395–1402). The descendants of Nerio I Acciajuoli ruled the city (as their capital) until the Turkish conquest of 1458.

== Early modern period ==
=== Ottoman Athens ===
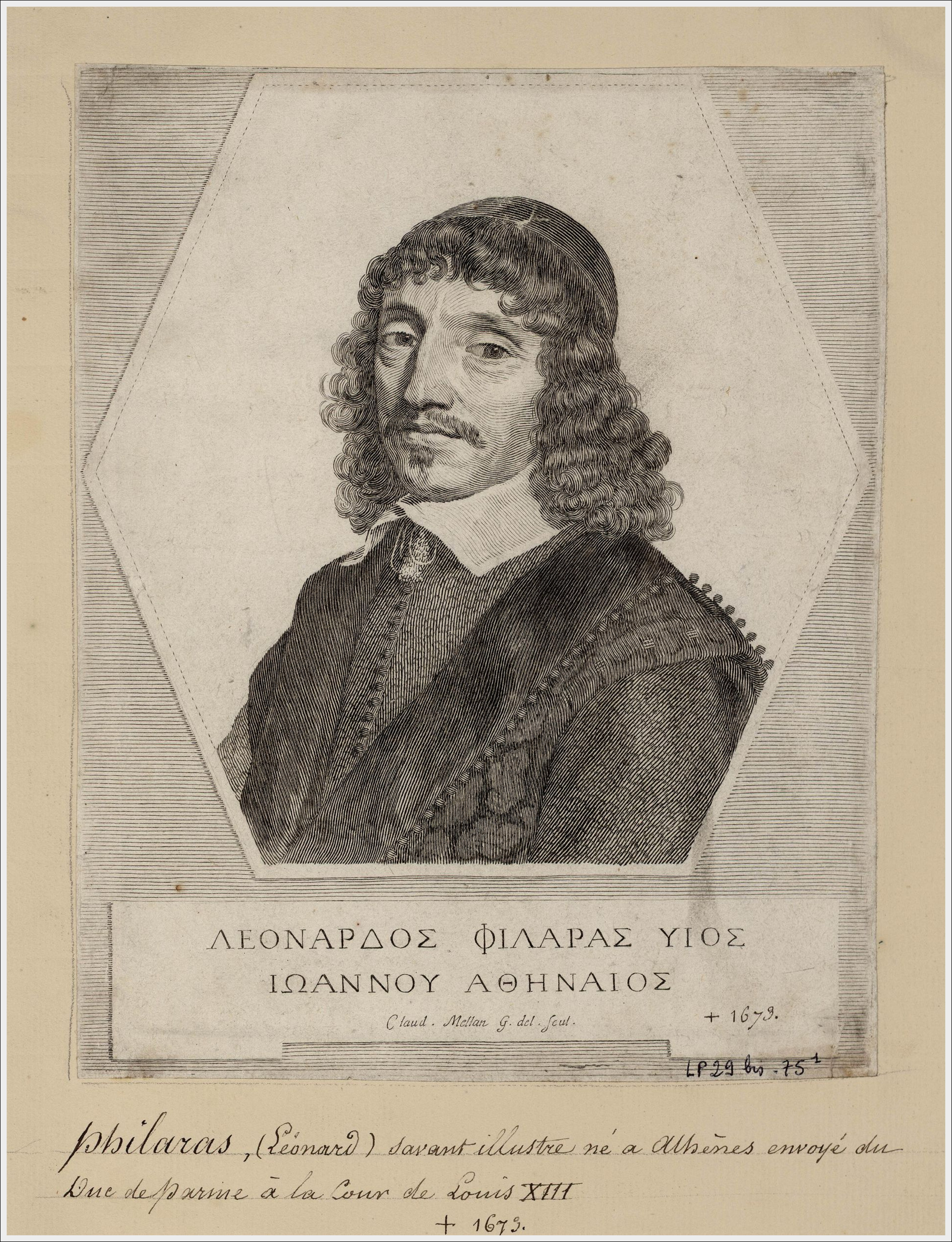
Leonardos Philaras (c. 1595–1673) was a Greek scholar, born in Athens, and an early supporter of Greek liberation.

The first Ottoman attack on Athens, which involved a short-lived occupation of the town, came in 1397, under the Ottoman generals Yaqub Pasha and Timurtash. Finally, in 1458, Athens was captured by the Ottomans under the personal leadership of Sultan Mehmed II. As the Ottoman Sultan rode into the city, he was greatly struck by the beauty of its ancient monuments and issued a firman (imperial edict) forbidding their looting or destruction, on pain of death. The Parthenon was converted into the main mosque of the city.

Under Ottoman rule, Athens was denuded of any importance and its population severely declined, leaving it as a "small country town" (Franz Babinger). From the early 17th century, Athens came under the jurisdiction of the Kizlar Agha, the chief black eunuch of the Sultan's harem. The city had originally been granted by Sultan Ahmed I (r. 1603–1617) to Basilica, one of his favourite concubines, who hailed from the city, in response of complaints of maladministration by the local governors. After her death, Athens came under the purview of the Kizlar Agha.

The Turks began a practice of storing gunpowder and explosives in the Parthenon and Propylaea. In 1640, a lightning bolt struck the Propylaea, causing its destruction. In 1687, during the Morean War, the Acropolis was besieged by the Venetians under Francesco Morosini, and the temple of Athena Nike was dismantled by the Ottomans to fortify the Parthenon. A shot fired during the bombardment of the Acropolis caused a powder magazine in the Parthenon to explode (26 September), and the building was severely damaged, giving it largely the appearance it has today. The Venetian occupation of Athens lasted for six months, and both the Venetians and the Ottomans participated in the looting of the Parthenon. One of its western pediments was removed, causing even more damage to the structure. During the Venetian occupation, the two mosques of the city were converted into Catholic and Protestant churches, but on 9 April 1688 the Venetians abandoned Athens again to the Ottomans.

In the 18th century, the city recovered much of its prosperity. During Michel Fourmont's visit in the city in the 1720s, he witnessed much construction going on, and by the time the Athenian teacher Ioannis Benizelos wrote an account of the city's affairs in the 1770s, Athens was once again enjoying some prosperity, so that, according to Benizelos, it "could be cited as an example to the other cities of Greece". Its Greek population possessed a considerable degree of self-government, under a council of primates composed of the leading aristocratic families, along with the city's metropolitan bishop. The community was quite influential with the Ottoman authorities, the pasha (governor), the kadi (judge), the mufti (Islamic prelate), and the garrison commander of the Acropolis—according to Benizelos, if the pasha did not treat them well and heed their opinion, he was liable to be removed before his annual term of office was out—particularly through the influence at Constantinople of the two Athenian-born patriarchs of Jerusalem, Parthenius (1737–1766) and Ephram II (1766–1770). Taxation was also light, with only the haraç tax payable to the Ottoman government, as well as the salt tax and a water-tax for the olive yards and gardens.

This peaceful situation was interrupted in 1752–1753, when the execution of the previous Kizlar Agha resulted in the dispatch of a new pasha, Sari Muselimi. The Greek and Turkish communities eventually started protests, accusing him of abusing his powers; Sari Muselimi killed some of the notables who protested, whereupon the populace burned down his residence. The pasha fled to the Acropolis, where he was besieged by the Athenians, until the Ottoman governor of Negroponte intervened and restored order, imprisoning the metropolitan bishop and imposing a heavy fine on the Greek community. In 1759 the new pasha, a native Muslim, destroyed one of the pillars of the Temple of Olympian Zeus to provide material for a fifth mosque for the city—an illegal act, as the temple was considered the Sultan's property. In the next year, Athens was removed from the purview of the Kizlar Agha and transferred to the privy purse of the Sultan. Henceforth it would be leased as a malikhane, a form of tax farming where the owner bought the proceeds of the city for a fixed sum, and enjoyed them for life.

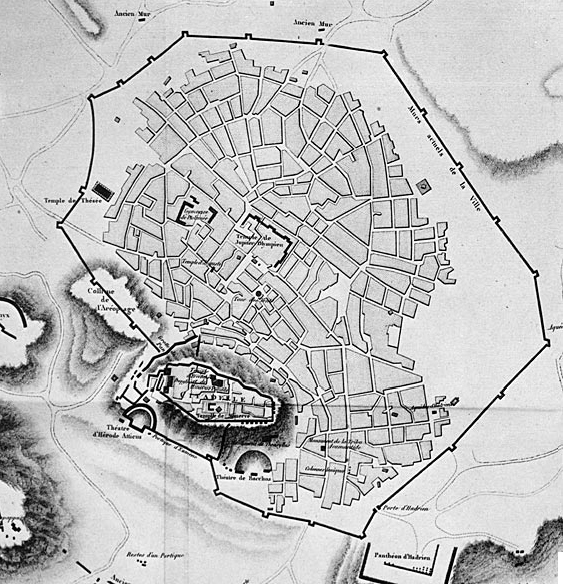
Map of late Ottoman Athens, with the Wall of Haseki

The first owner (malikhane sahib), Ismail Agha, a local Turk from Livadeia, had been popularly seen as a humane leader, who appointed good voevodas. This led to him being nicknamed "the Good". English visitors during the 1760s report a population of around 10,000 inhabitants, around four-fifths of which were Christians. The Turkish community numbered several families established in the city since the Ottoman conquest; and their relations with their Christian neighbours were friendlier than elsewhere, as they had assimilated themselves to a degree, even to the point of drinking wine. The climate was healthy, but the city relied chiefly on pasture—practiced by the Arvanites of Attica—rather than agriculture. It exported leather, soap, grain, oil, honey, wax, resin, a little silk, cheese, and valonia, chiefly to Constantinople and France. The city hosted a French and an English consul. During the Orlov Revolt of 1770 the Athenians, with the exception of the younger men, remained cautious and passive, even when the Greek rebel chieftain Mitromaras seized Salamis. Nevertheless, it was only thanks to the intervention of Ismail Agha that the city was spared a massacre as reprisals, and was forced to pay an indemnity instead.

Ismail Agha's successor, Hadji Ali Haseki was seen as cruel and tyrannical, and the twenty years of his on-and-off rule over the city is opined by historians to be one of the worst periods of the city's history. Supported by the city's aristocratic families, and his relationship with the Sultan's sister, who was his lover, he extorted large sums from the populace, and seized much property from them. Through protests in Constantinople, the Athenians achieved his recall several times, but Haseki always returned, until his final downfall and execution in 1795. Haseki's early tenure also saw two large Muslim Albanian raids into Attica, as a response to which he ordered the construction of a new city wall, the "Wall of Haseki", which was partly constructed with material taken from ancient monuments. Between 1801 and 1805 Lord Elgin, the British ambassador to the Ottoman Empire, arranged for the removal of many sculptures from the Parthenon (the Elgin Marbles). Along with the Panathenaic frieze, one of the six caryatids of the Erechtheion was extracted and replaced with a plaster mold. All in all, fifty pieces of sculpture were carried away, including three fragments purchased by the French.

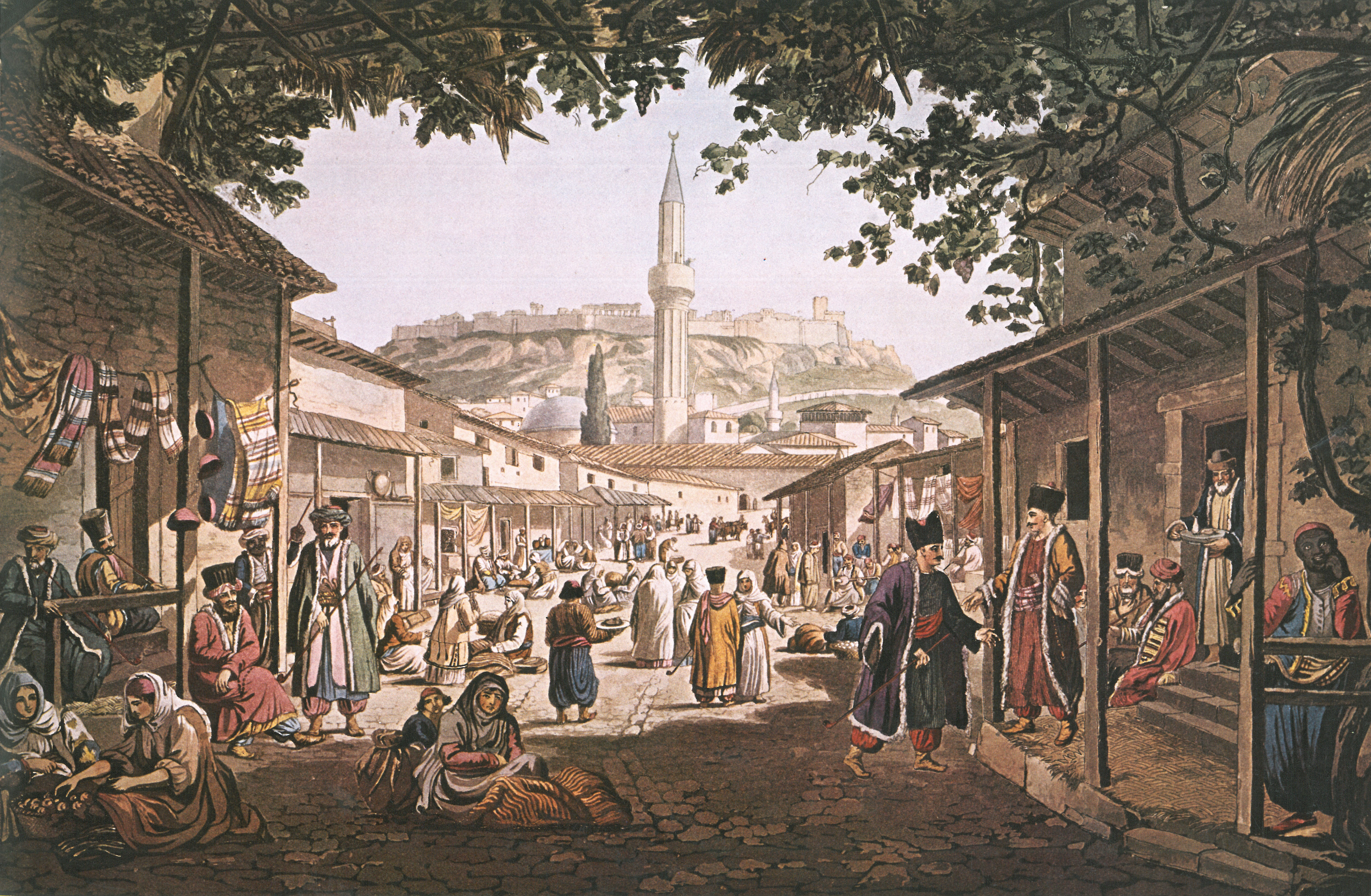
Edward Dodwell: The Bazar of Athens, 1821

Athens produced some notable intellectuals during this era, such as Demetrius Chalcondyles (1424–1511), who became a celebrated Renaissance teacher of Greek and of Platonic philosophy in Italy. Chalcondyles published the first printed editions of Homer (in 1488), of Isocrates (in 1493), and of the Suda lexicon (in 1499), and a Greek grammar (Erotemata).

His cousin Laonicus Chalcondyles (c. 1423–1490) was also a native of Athens, a notable scholar and Byzantine historian and one of the most valuable of the later Greek historians. He was the author of the valuable work Historiarum Demonstrationes (Demonstrations of History) and was a great admirer of the ancient writer Herodotus, encouraging the interest of contemporary Italian humanists in that ancient historian. In the 17th century, Athenian-born Leonardos Philaras (c. 1595–1673), was a Greek scholar, politician, diplomat, advisor and the Duke of Parma's ambassador to the French court, spending much of his career trying to persuade western European intellectuals to support Greek independence.

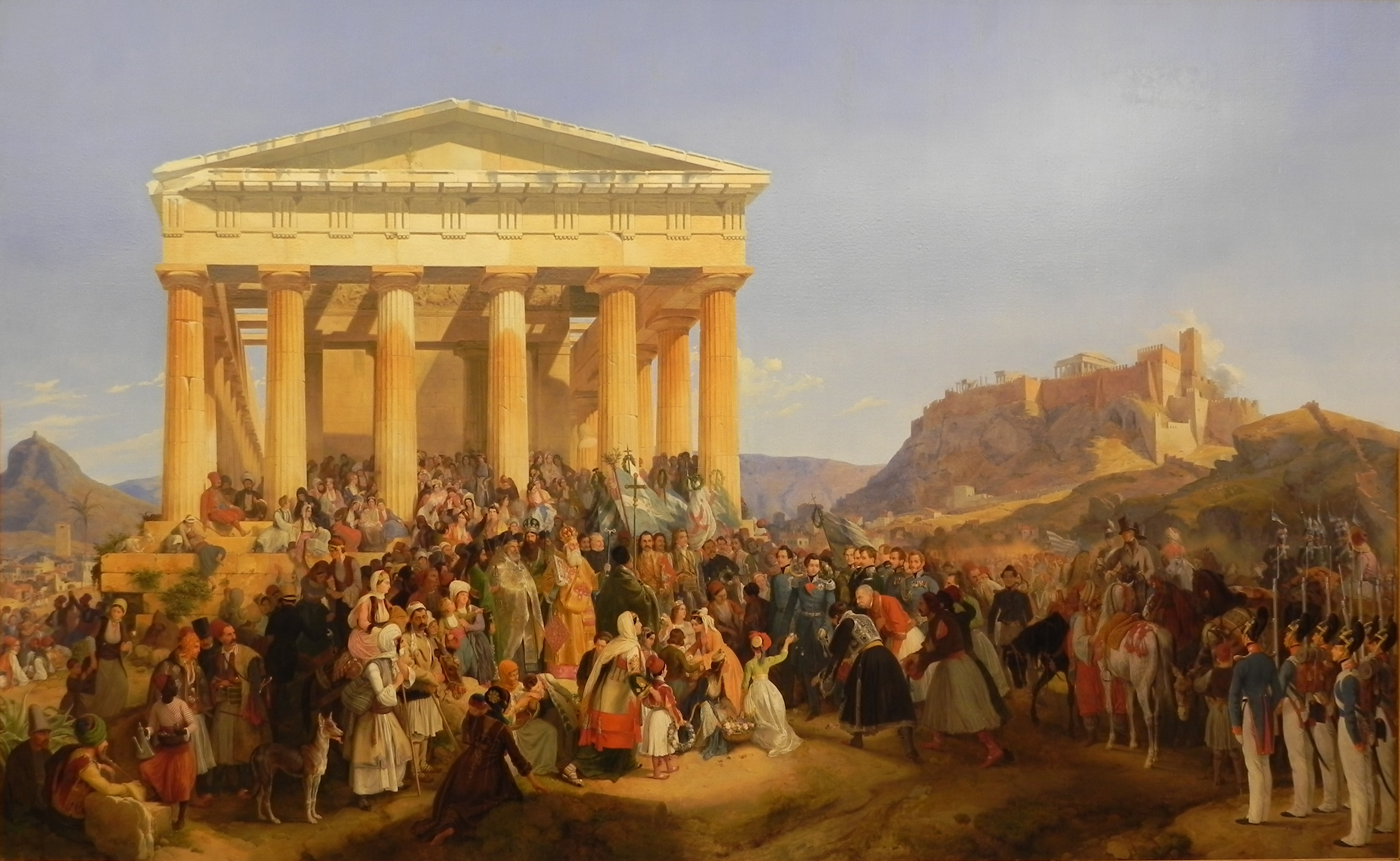
The Entry of King Otto of Greece into Athens by Peter von Hess, 1839

=== Independence from the Ottomans ===
In 1822, a Greek insurgency captured the city, but it fell to the Ottomans again in 1826 (though Acropolis held till June 1827). Again the ancient monuments suffered badly. The Ottoman forces remained in possession until March 1833, when they withdrew. At that time, the city (as throughout the Ottoman period) had a small population of an estimated 400 houses, mostly located around the Acropolis in the Plaka.

== Modern history ==
In 1832, Otto, Prince of Bavaria, was proclaimed King of Greece. He adopted the Greek spelling of his name, King Othon, as well as Greek national dress, and made it one of his first tasks as king to conduct a detailed archaeological and topographical survey of Athens, his new capital. He assigned Gustav Eduard Schaubert and Stamatios Kleanthis to complete this task. At that time, Athens had a population of only 4,000 to 5,000, residing in a scattering of houses at the foot of the Acropolis, located in what today covers the district of Plaka.

Athens was chosen as the Greek capital for historical and sentimental reasons. There are few buildings dating from the period of the Byzantine Empire or the 18th century. Once the capital was established, a modern city plan was laid out and public buildings were erected.

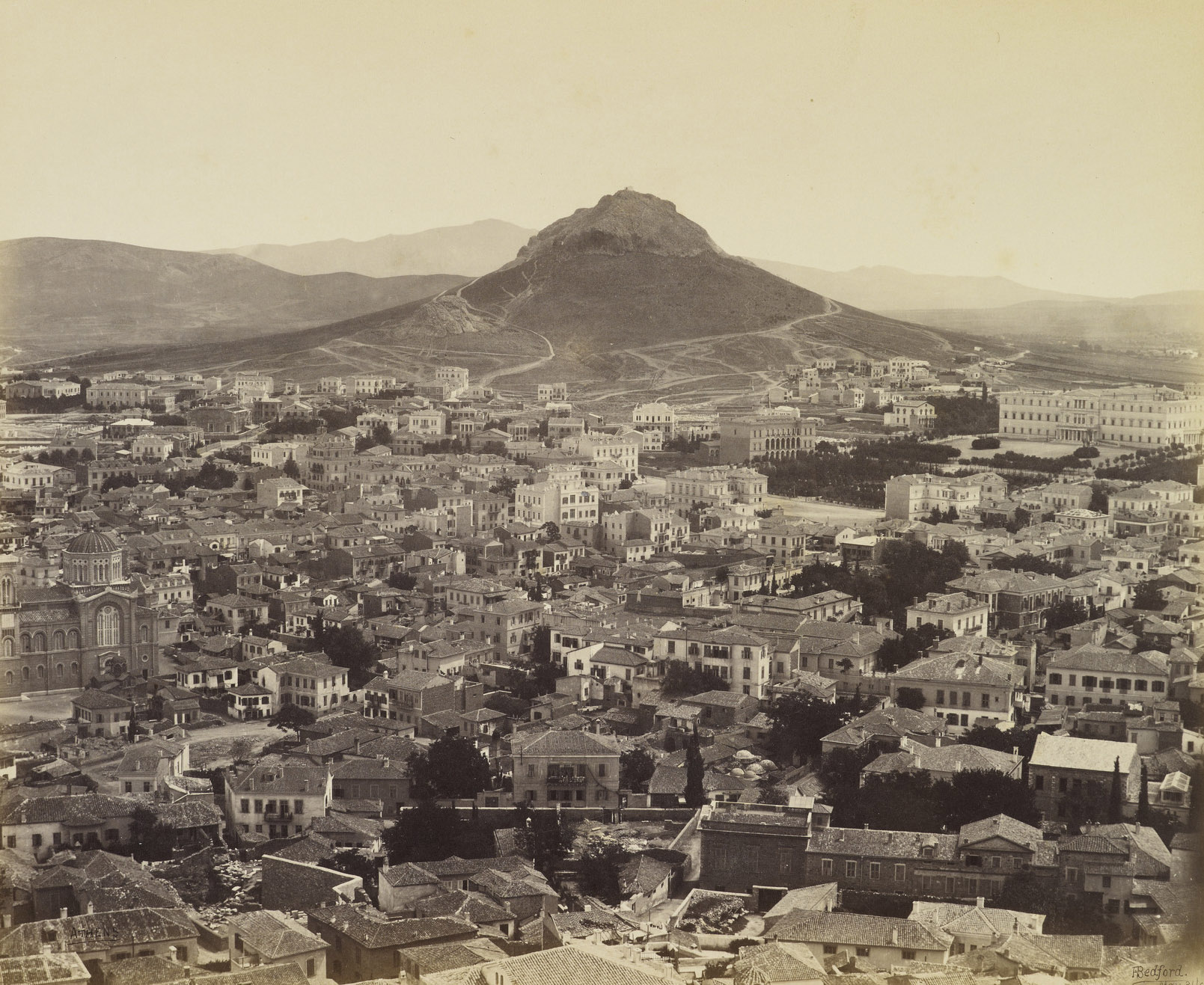
View towards Lycabettus, 1862

The finest legacy of this period are the buildings of the University of Athens (1837), the National Gardens of Athens (1840), the National Library of Greece (1842), the Old Royal Palace (now the Greek Parliament Building; 1843), the Old Parliament Building (1858), the City Hall (1874), the Zappeion Exhibition Hall (1878), the Greek National Academy (1885) and the New Royal Palace (now the Presidential Palace; 1897). Athens hosted the 1896 Summer Olympics, the first in modern times.

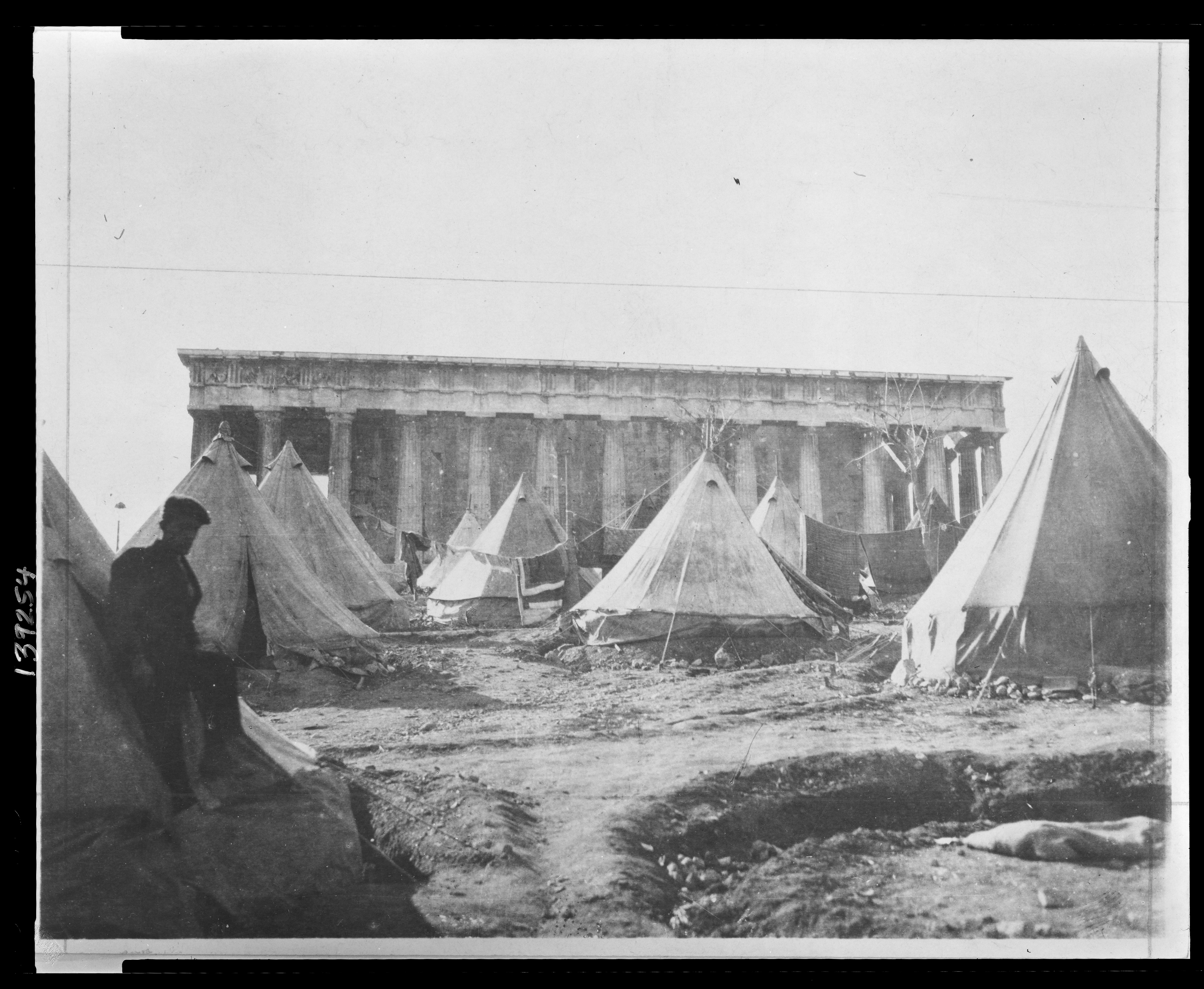
Temporary accommodation for the Greek refugees from Asia Minor in tents in Thiseio. After the Asia Minor Catastrophe in 1922 thousands of Asia Minor Greek families settled in Athens and the population of the city doubled.

Athens experienced its second period of explosive growth following the disastrous Greco-Turkish War in 1921, when more than a million Greek refugees from Asia Minor were resettled in Greece, after the Asia Minor Catastrophe in 1922. Suburbs such as Nea Ionia and Nea Smyrni began as refugee settlements on the Athens outskirts and the population of the city doubled.

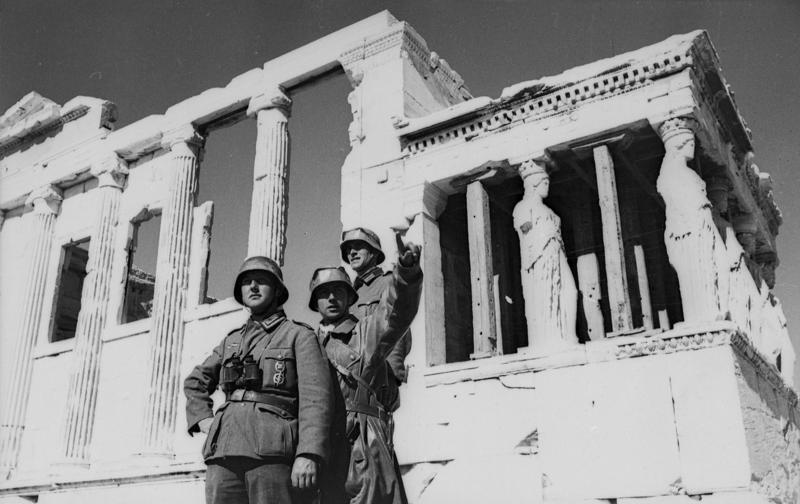
German soldiers on the Acropolis

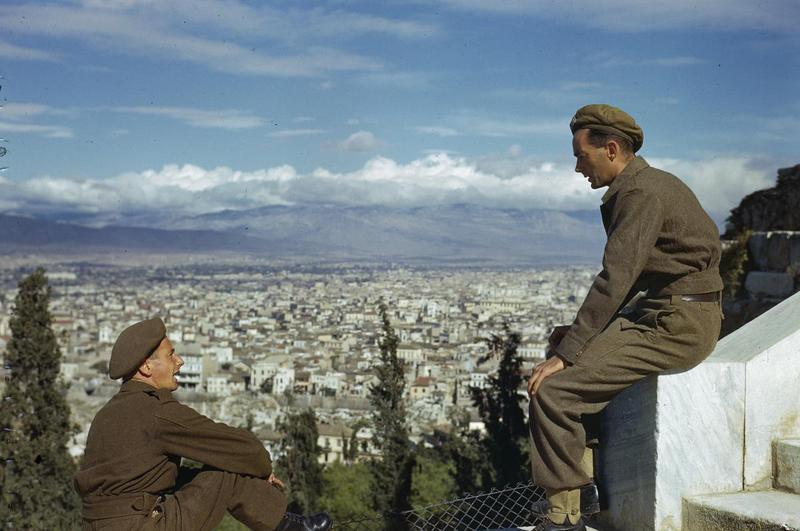
British troops at the Acropolis in Athens, October 1944

=== Athens during World War II ===
Athens was occupied by the Axis (primarily German soldiers) during World War II and experienced terrible privations during the later years of the war. The Great Famine greatly affected the city during the occupation. Several resistance organizations were present inside Athens to fight against the occupation, with EAM being the main. Following the liberation of Greece and the ensuing Greek Civil War, the Dekemvriana rocked the city with heavy fighting between communist forces and government forces backed by the British.

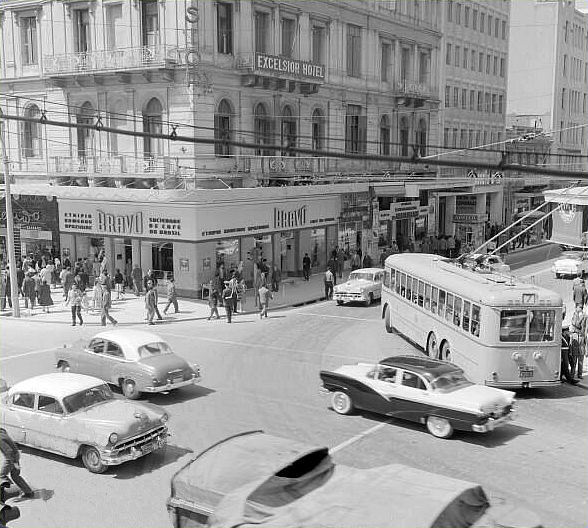
Omonoia Square during the 1960s

=== Contemporary Athens ===
Following World War II the city began to grow again as people migrated from the villages and islands to find work. Greek entry into the European Union in 1981 brought a flood of new investment to the city, but also increasing social and environmental problems. Athens had some of the worst traffic congestion and air pollution in the world at that time. This posed a new threat to the ancient monuments of Athens, as traffic vibration weakened foundations and air pollution corroded marble. The city's environmental and infrastructure problems were the main reason why Athens failed to secure the 1996 Centenary Olympic Games. Following the failed attempt to secure the 1996 Olympics, both the city of Athens and the Greek government, aided by European Union funds, undertook major infrastructure projects such as the new Athens Airport and a new metro system. The city also tackled air pollution by restricting the use of cars in the center of the city. As a result, Athens won its bid to host the 2004 Summer Olympic Games. Despite the skepticism of many observers, the games were a success and brought renewed prestige and tourism revenue to Athens. The 2008 Greek Riots began in Athens following the killing of a 15-year old student by an officer. As of May 2024, construction of a new metro line in Athens, Line 4, is underway, meaning the biggest infrastructure project in Greece at present. The new line will include 15 stations on a U-shaped underground route of 13 kilometers of tunnels, located mostly in central Athens. The project is expected to be completed in 2029.

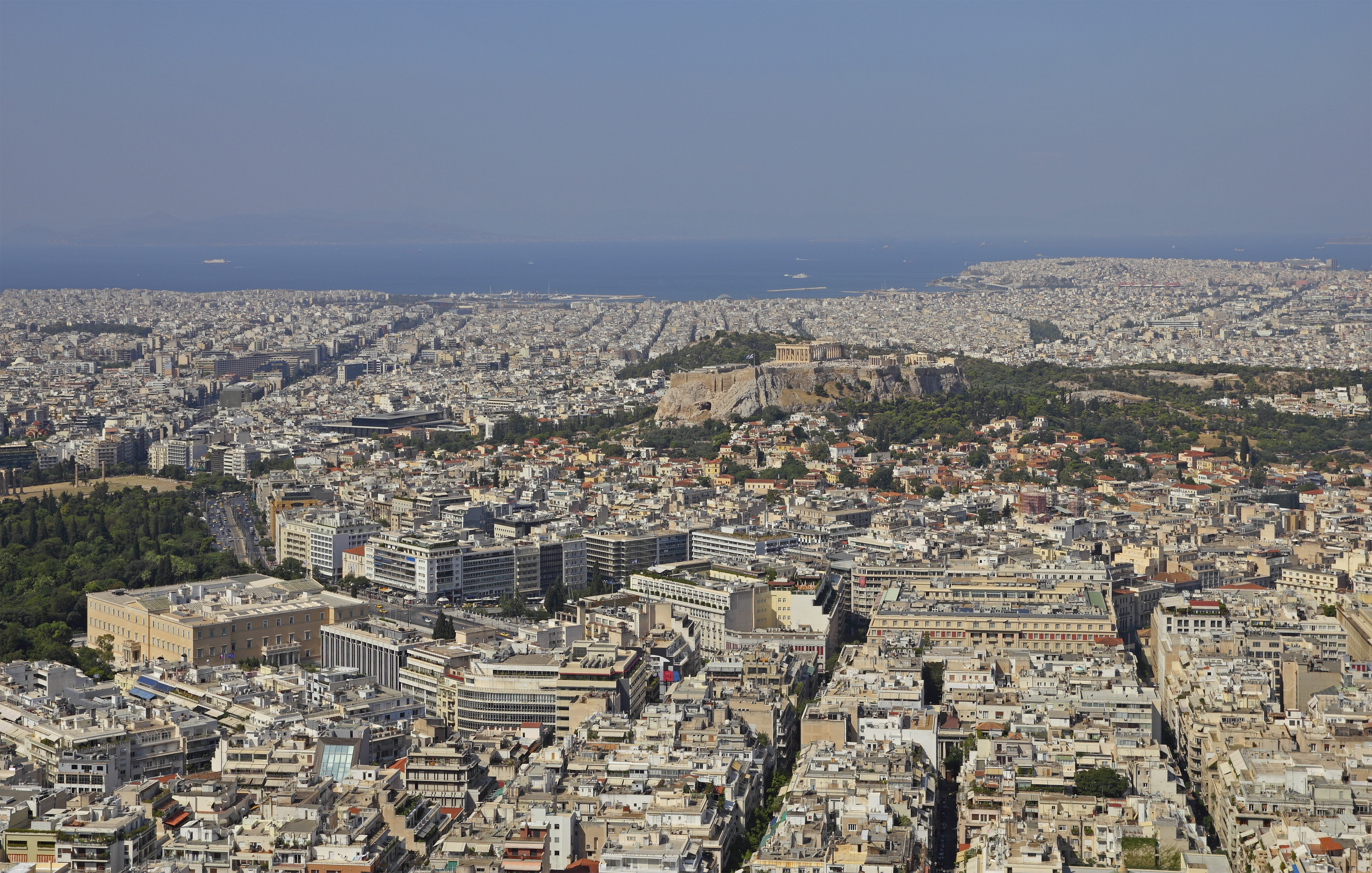
View of part of central Athens and some of the city's southern suburbs from Lykavittos Hill

=== Recent historical population ===
Year	City population	Urban population	Metro population
1833	4,000	–	–
1839	26.473	–	–
1870	44,500	–	–
1896	123,000	–	–
1921 (Pre-Population exchange)	473,000	–	
1921 (Post-Population exchange)	718,000	–	–
1971	867,023	–	–
1981	885,737	–	–
1991	772,072	–	3,444,358
2001	745,514	3,130,841	3,761,810
2021	643,449	3,041,131	4,638,281

== Ancient sites in Athens ==
- The Acropolis, with the Parthenon
- Agora
- Arch of Hadrian
- Areopagus
- Kerameikos
- Lysicrates monument
- Philopappos monument
- Pnyx
- Temple of Hephaestus
- Temple of Olympian Zeus
- Tower of the Winds

== Athenians ==
=== Ancient Athenians ===
- Theseus, mythical king
- Solon (c. 640–560 BC), statesman
- Peisistratos (fl. 564–528 BC), tyrant
- Cleisthenes (c. 570–500 BC), statesman
- Simonides of Ceos (c. 556–468 BC), lyric poet
- Miltiades the Younger (c. 550–489 BC), statesman and general
- Aeschylus (c. 525–455 BC), tragic poet
- Themistocles (c. 524–459 BC), politician and general
- Cimon (c. 510–450 BC), statesman and general
- Apollodorus Skiagraphos (fifth century BC), painter
- Sophocles (c. 496–406 BC), tragic poet
- Pericles (c. 495–429 BC), statesman and general
- Herodotus (c. 484–425 BC), historian, originally from Halicarnassus
- Euripides (c. 480–406 BC), tragic poet
- Pheidias (c. 480–430 BC), sculptor, painter and architect
- Aspasia (c. 470–400 BC), lover and partner of Pericles, possibly a hetaera, originally from Milet
- Nicias (c. 470–413 BC), politician and general
- Socrates (c. 469–399 BC), philosopher
- Telecleides (fl. 450–430 BC), playwright of the Old Comedy
- Thucydides (c. 460–400 BC), historian and general
- Hermippus (fifth century BC), playwright of the Old Comedy
- Cleon (fl. 435–422 BC), general during the Peloponnesian War
- Alcibiades (c. 450–404 BC), statesman, orator and general
- Ephialtes of Athens (c. 450–461 BC), politician
- Agathon (c. 448–400 BC), tragic poet
- Eupolis (c. 446–411 BC), playwright of the Old Comedy
- Aristophanes (c. 446–386 BC), playwright of the Old Comedy
- Thrasybulus (c. 440–388 BC), general and democratic leader
- Xenophon (c. 430–354 BC), historian, soldier and mercenary, and a student of Socrates
- Plato (c. 425–348 BC), philosopher
- Menander (c. 341–290 BC), playwright of the New Comedy
- Aristotle (384–322 BC), philosopher, native from Stagira, Chalkidike
- Demosthenes (384–322 BC), statesman and orator
- St. Dionysius the Areopagite (c. 1st century AD), judge, early convert to Christianity, and first Bishop of Athens
- Athenagoras of Athens (c. 133–190 AD), Father of the Church and apologist
- Clement of Alexandria (c. 150–215 AD), Christian theologian

=== Medieval period ===
- Aelia Eudocia Augusta, born as Athenaïs, later Saint Eudocia (c. 401–460 AD), wife of Emperor Theodosius II
- Saint Giles (c. 650–710 AD), hermit saint
- Irene of Athens (c. 752–803 AD), empress consort, thereafter Byzantine empress
- Demetrios Chalkokondyles (1423–1511), scholar
- Saint Philothei, née Revoula Benizelos (1522–1589), martyr and saint
- Leonardos Philaras (1595–1673), scholar, politician and diplomat

=== Modern period ===
- Panagis Kalkos (1818–1875), architect
- Stefanos Dragoumis (1842–1923), judge, writer and Prime Minister of Greece
- Dimitrios Rallis (1844–1921), politician and reiterate prime minister (1897, 1904, 1905, 1909, 1920–21)
- Anastasios Metaxas (1862–1937), architect and Olympic shooter
- Constantine I of Greece (1868–1923), King of the Greeks (1913–17, 1920–22)
- Ion Dragoumis (1878–1920), diplomat, philosopher, writer and revolutionary
- Ioannis Rallis (1878–1946), Prime Minister of Greece (1943–44)
- Prince Andrew of Greece and Denmark (1882–1944), son of King George I of Greece, father of Prince Philip, Duke of Edinburgh
- Alexandros Papagos (1883–1955), Field Marshal and Prime Minister (1952–55)
- Helen of Greece and Denmark (1896–1982), daughter of King Constantine, mother of King Michael I of Romania and Queen Mother of Romania
- Aspasia Manos (1896–1972), wife of Alexander I of Greece
- Paul of Greece (1901–1964), King of the Greeks (1947–1964)
- Dora Stratou (1903–1988), singer, dancer and choreographer
- Princess Irene, Duchess of Aosta (1904–1974), fifth child and second daughter of Constantine I of Greece
- Angelos Terzakis (1907–1979), writer
- Stavros Niarchos (1909–1996), shipping tycoon
- Melina Mercouri (1920–1994), actress, singer and politician
- Dimitri Terzakis (born 1938), composer
- Stavros Dimas (born 1941), politician and former European Commissioner (2004–09)
- Lucas Papademos (born 1947), economist and Prime Minister of Greece (2011–12)
- Maria Farantouri (born 1947), singer
- Arianna Huffington (born 1950), author and journalist
- Antonis Samaras (born 1951), politician
- Louka Katseli (born 1952), economist and politician
- Dora Bakogianni (born 1954), politician
- Kostas Karamanlis (born 1956), politician and Prime Minister of Greece (2004–09)
- Toula Limnaios (born 1963), dancer and choreographer
- Pavlos, Crown Prince of Greece (born 1967), eldest son and second child of Constantine II
- Leonidas Kavakos (born 1967), violinist and conductor
- Kyriakos Mitsotakis (born 1968), politician and Prime Minister of Greece (2019–present)
- Giorgos Lanthimos (born 1973), film producer and film director
- Alexis Tsipras (born 1974), politician and Prime Minister of Greece (2015–2019)
- Sofia Pappa Mathematician

== See also ==
- City walls of Athens
- Timeline of Athens

== Sources ==
- Bayliss, Andrew J. (2011). After Demosthenes : the politics of early Hellenistic Athens. London: Continuum. ISBN 9781441111517.
- Bouras, Charalambos (28 February 2018). Byzantine Athens, 10th - 12th Centuries. Routledge. ISBN 978-1-351-59697-8.
- Castrén, Paavo, ed. (1994). Post-Herulian Athens : aspects of life and culture in Athens, A.D. 267-529. Helsinki: Suomen Ateenan-instituutin säätiö. ISBN 9789519529523.
- Dimitriadou, Eirini M. (31 March 2019). Early Athens: Settlements and Cemeteries in the Submycenaean, Geometric and Archaic Periods. ISD LLC. ISBN 978-1-938770-88-3.
- Freely, John (2004). Strolling through Athens: Fourteen Unforgettable Walks through Europe's Oldest City. Tauris Parke Paperbacks. ISBN 978-1-85043-595-2.
- Geagan, Daniel J. (1967). The Athenian Constitution after Sulla. Athens: American School of Classical Studies at Athens.
- Geagan, Daniel J. (1979). "Roman Athens: Some Aspects of Life and Culture I. 86 B.C. – A.D. 267". Aufstieg und Niedergang der Römischen Welt. 2.7.1: 371–437.
- Habicht, Christian (1997). Athens from Alexander to Antony. Cambridge, Mass.: Harvard University Press. ISBN 9780674051119.
- Hoff, Michael C.; Rotroff, Susan I., eds. (1997). The Romanization of Athens: Proceedings of an International Conference Held at Lincoln, Nebraska (April 1996). Oxbow Books. ISBN 978-1-900188-51-7.
- Holland, Tom (2004). Rubicon: The Triumph and Tragedy of the Roman Republic. London: Abacus. ISBN 0-349-11563-X.
- Hornblower, Simon (2011). The Greek world : 479-323 BC (4th ed.). Abingdon, Oxon: Routledge. ISBN 9780415602921.
- Mikalson, Jon D. (1998). Religion in Hellenistic Athens. University of California Press. ISBN 978-0-520-91967-9.
- Oliver, G. J. (2007). War, food, and politics in early Hellenistic Athens. Oxford: Oxford University Press. ISBN 9780199283507.
- O'Sullivan, Lara (2009). The Regime of Demetrius of Phalerum in Athens, 317-307 BCE: A Philosopher in Politics. Leiden: Brill. ISBN 978-90-04-17888-5.
- Paga, Jessica (2021). Building democracy in late archaic Athens. New York, NY. ISBN 9780190083571.
- Palagia, Olga, ed. (2016). The Macedonians in Athens, 322-229 B.C. proceedings of an international conference held at the University of Athens, May 24-26, 2001. Oxford: Oxbow Books. ISBN 9781785705304.
- Parker, Robert (1997). Athenian Religion: A History. Oxford University Press. ISBN 978-0-19-815240-8.
- Samons II, Loren J., ed. (15 January 2007). The Cambridge Companion to the Age of Pericles. Cambridge University Press. ISBN 978-1-139-82669-3.
- Sancisi-Weerdenburg, Heleen, ed. (2000). Peisistratos and the Tyranny: A Reappraisal of the Evidence. BRILL. ISBN 978-90-5063-416-8.
- Sicilianos, Demetrios (1960). Old and New Athens (Abridged ed.). Putnam.
- Thanasakis, Konstantinos; Georgopoulou, Maria, eds. (2019). Ottoman Athens: Archaeology, Topography, History. Athens: Gennadius Library. ISBN 978-960-99945-4-5.
- Vryonis, Speros (2002). "The Ghost of Athens in Byzantine and Ottoman Times". Balkan Studies: Biannual Publication of the Institute for Balkan Studies. 43 (1): 5–115. ISSN 2241-1674.
- van Wees, Hans (2013). Ships and silver, taxes and tribute : a fiscal history of archaic Athens. London: I B Tauris. ISBN 9781780766867.
- Worthington, Ian (2021). Athens after empire : a history from Alexander the Great to the Emperor Hadrian. New York, NY: Oxford University Press. ISBN 9780190633981.
