= Patriarch Meletius =

Patriarch Meletius may refer to:

- Meletius of Antioch, Patriarch in 361–381
- Meletius I of Constantinople, Greek Patriarch of Alexandria in 1590–1601 and Ecumenical Patriarch of Constantinople in 1597-1598
- Meletius of Jerusalem, Patriarch from 1731 to 1737
- Meletius II of Constantinople, Ecumenical Patriarch in 1769
- Meletius III of Constantinople, Ecumenical Patriarch in 1845
- Meletius II of Antioch, Patriarch from 1899 to 1906
- Meletius Metaxakis, Ecumenical Patriarch from 1921 to 1923 and Greek Patriarch of Alexandria from 1926 to 1935
