= Timeline of Athens =

The following is a timeline of the history of the city of Athens, Greece.

== Prior to 15th century ==
- 630 BCE – Temple of Athena Polias built (approximate date).
- 594 BCE – Solonian law established.
- 575 BCE – Coins in use (approximate date).
- 566 BCE – Panathenaic festival begins.
- 560 BCE – Peisistratos in power.
- 546 BCE – Athenian tetradrachm (coin) in use.
- 480 and 479 BCE - Athens is burnt, then destroyed by the Persians
- 447 BCE – Parthenon construction begins.
- 431 BCE – Peloponnesian War begins with Sparta.
- 430 BCE – Plague.
- 424 BCE – Temple of Athena Nike built.
- 409 BCE – Erechtheion built (approximate date).
- 404 BCE – Athens defeated in the Peloponnesian War
- 385 BCE – Academy founded (approximate date).
- 335 BCE – Lyceum founded (approximate date).
- 229 BCE – Athens liberated from Macedonian supremacy, but refuses to join Achaean League.
- 88 BCE – City sacked by Roman forces.
- 267 CE – Agora sacked by Germanic Heruli forces.
- 396 CE – City taken by forces of Visigoth Alaric.
- 582 – City sacked by Slavic forces.
- 1146 – City "plundered by Roger, King of Sicily."
- 1204 – Othon de la Roche of Burgundy becomes Duke of Athens.
- 1311 – City under Aragonese rule.

== 15th–19th centuries ==
- 1456 – Conquest by the Ottoman Empire.
- 1687 – City besieged by Venetian forces under Francesco Morosini during the Morean War.
- 1801 – Elgin Marbles taken to Britain.
- 1821 – April: Siege of the Acropolis (1821–22) begins.
- 1826 – August: Siege of the Acropolis (1826–27) begins.
- 1829 – National Archaeological Museum established.
- 1833 – City becomes part of the Attica and Boeotia Prefecture administrative division.
- 1834
  - City becomes capital of Kingdom of Greece.
  - National Library of Greece headquartered in city.
- 1837 – National and Kapodistrian University of Athens ("Othonian University") and National Technical University of Athens ("Royal School of Arts") established.
- 1840 – Royal Garden now National Garden planted.
- 1842 – Observatory built.
- 1843
  - 3 November: Third of September National Assembly of the Greeks at Athens begins.
  - Royal Palace built.
- 1846 – Omonoia Square ("Palace Square") laid out.
- 1854 – Occupation of city by British and French forces during the Crimean War begins.
- 1856 – Occupation of city by British and French forces ends.
- 1860s – Anafiotika neighborhood settled.
- 1862 – 10 December: Second National Assembly of the Greeks at Athens begins.
- 1869 – Athens and Piraeus Railway in operation.
- 1871 – Athens Conservatoire founded.
- 1874 – German Archaeological Institute at Athens established.
- 1876 – Athens Stock Exchange established.
- 1878 – Hotel Grande Bretagne in business.
- 1881 – American School of Classical Studies at Athens established.
- 1886 – British School at Athens established.
- 1896 – 1896 Summer Olympics held.
- 1899
  - City becomes part of the Attica Prefecture administrative division.
  - Spyridon Merkouris becomes mayor.

== 20th century ==
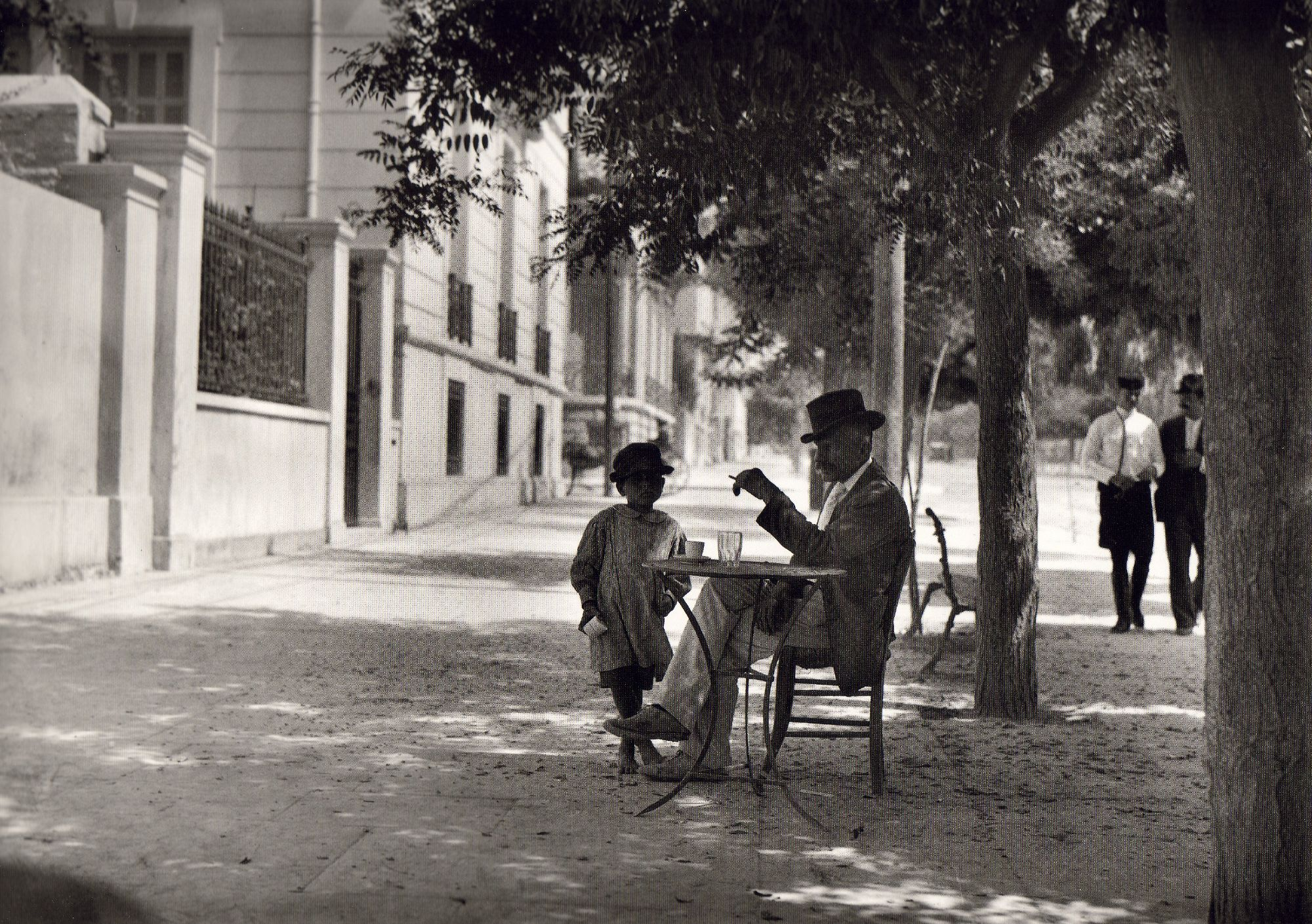
Athens in 1920

- 1904
  - Athens Metro in operation.
  - Athens Railway Station opens.
- 1905 – Athens News Agency established.
- 1907 – Population: 167,479.
- 1908 – Panathinaikos A.O. football club formed.
- 1909 – Goudi coup.
- 1916 – 1 December: "Allied and Greek forces clash."
- 1919 – Athens Chamber of Commerce and Industry founded.
- 1920
  - * Third National Assembly of the Greeks at Athens begins.
  - Population: 453,042 metro.
- 1922

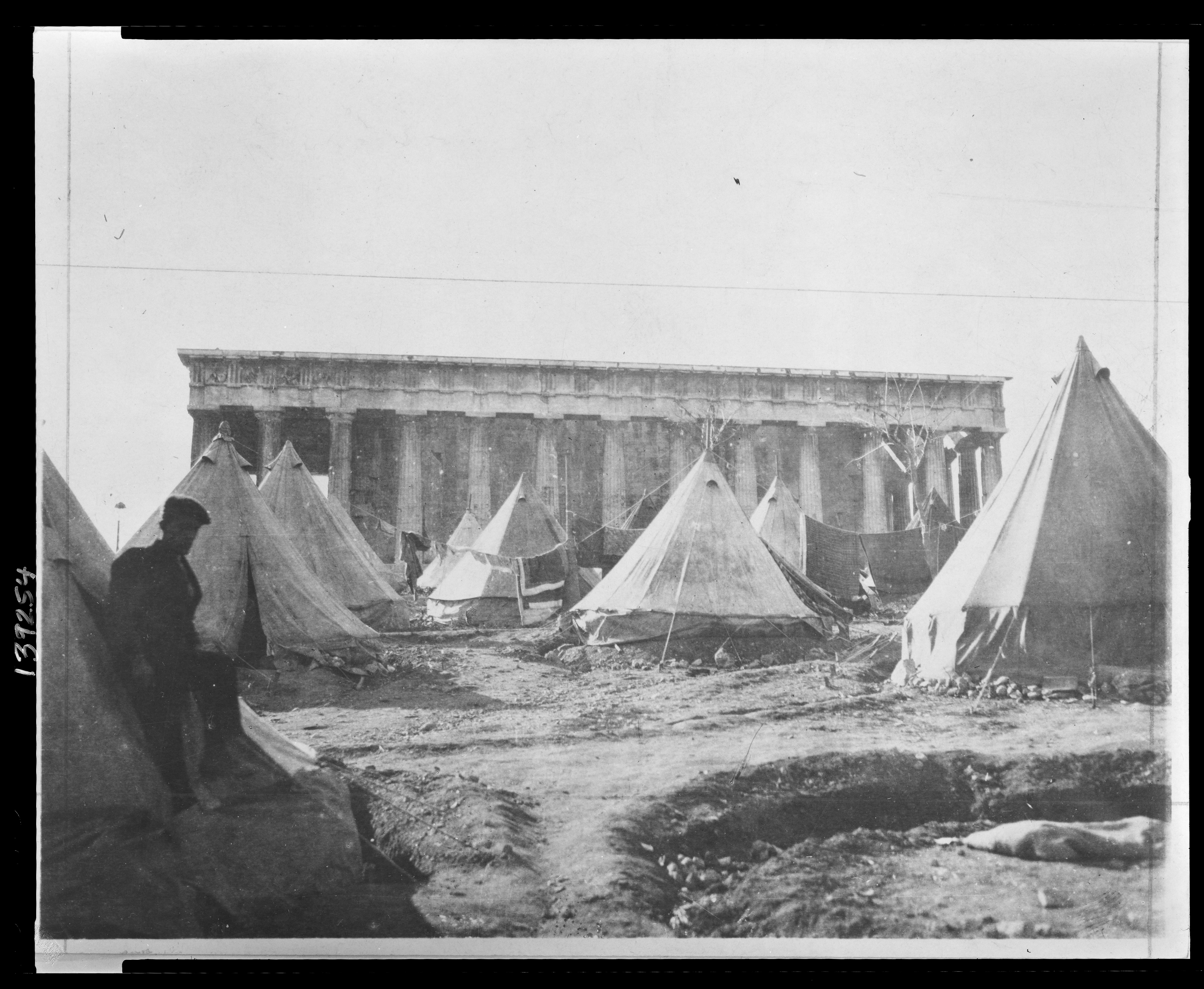
Temporary accommodation for the Greek refugees from Asia Minor Asia in tents in Thiseio. After the Asia Minor Catastrophe in 1922 thousands of Asia Minor Greek families settled in Athens and the population of the city doubled.

  - After the Asia Minor Catastrophe in 1922 and the Population exchange between Greece and Turkey, Athens experienced its second period of explosive growth. More than a million Greek refugees from Asia Minor settled in Athens. Suburbs such as Nea Ionia and Nea Smyrni began as shantytowns refugee settlements on the Athens outskirts and the population of the city doubled.
  - To Vima newspaper begins publication.
  - Leoforos Alexandras Stadium opens in Ampelokipoi.
- 1923
  - Vradyni newspaper begins publication.
  - Fourth National Assembly of the Greeks at Athens, convenes.
- 1924 - A.E.K. (sports club) formed near Omonoia Square.
- 1926 – Academy of Athens founded.
- 1928 – Population: 802,000 metro.
- 1929 – Residential Psychiko suburb developed.
- 1930 – National Theatre of Greece and Benaki Museum established.
- 1932 – Residential Filothei suburb developed.
- 1935
  - October: Fifth National Assembly of the Greeks at Athens held.
  - Alexandras Prosfygika housing complex built on Alexandras Avenue.
- 1938 – Airport built.
- 1939 – Greek National Opera established.
- 1940 – Population: 481,225 city; 1,124,109 metro.
- 1941 – 27 April: City occupation by German forces begins.
- 1944
  - 14 October: City occupation by German forces ends.
  - December: Dekemvriana clashes begin.
  - Ta Nea newspaper begins publication.
- 1947 – Star-Cinema opens.
- 1951 – Population: 559,250 city; 1,368,142 metro.
- 1955 – Athens Festival of arts begins.
- 1957
  - Astron Cinema opens.
  - Hellenic American Union founded.
- 1971 – Population: 867,023 city; 2,101,103 urban agglomeration.
- 1972 – City becomes part of the Athens Prefecture administrative division.
- 1973
  - Athens City Museum established.
  - Athens Polytechnic uprising.
- 1974 – Eleftherotypia newspaper begins publication.
- 1980 – 31 July: 1980 Turkish embassy attack in Athens.
- 1981 – Ethnos newspaper begins publication.
- 1983 – Eleftheros Typos newspaper begins publication.
- 1984 – Sister city relationship established with Los Angeles, California.
- 1987 – Miltiadis Evert becomes mayor.
- 1991 – Athens Concert Hall opens.
- 1994 – City becomes part of the Athens-Piraeus super-prefecture administrative division.
- 1995 – Dimitris Avramopoulos becomes mayor.
- 1998 – Kokkalis Foundation headquartered in city.
- 1999 – The 6.0 M_{w} Athens earthquake affected the area with a maximum Mercalli intensity of IX (Violent), killing 143, injuring 800–1,600, and leaving 50,000 homeless in the region.
- 2000 – Ambelokipi metro station, Megaro Moussikis metro station, and Panormou metro station open.

== 21st century ==
- 2001 – New Athens International Airport opens.
- 2003 – Dora Bakoyannis becomes mayor.
- 2004
  - Athens Tram begins operating.
  - 2004 Summer Olympics and Paralympics held.
- 2006 – Eurovision Song Contest 2006 held.
- 2007 – Nikitas Kaklamanis becomes mayor.
- 2008 – December: 2008 Greek riots.
- 2009 – Acropolis Museum and Art Foundation open.
- 2010
  - July: Journalist Giolias killed.
  - November: Muslim demonstration.
  - Giorgos Kaminis elected mayor.
- 2011
  - OASA takes over metro and tram services from Attiko Metro.
  - Population: 664,046 city; 3,737,550 metro.
- 2012
  - 13 February: Protest.
  - Stavros Niarchos Foundation Cultural Center construction begins.
- 2013 – Flooding.

== See also ==
- History of Athens
- List of newspapers in Athens
- List of mayors of Athens, 1836–present

== Bibliography ==
- J. Willoughby Rosse (1858). "Athens". Index of Dates ... Facts in the Chronology and History of the World. London: H.G. Bohn. hdl:2027/uva.x030807786 – via HathiTrust.
- George Henry Townsend (1867), "Athens", A Manual of Dates (2nd ed.), London: Frederick Warne & Co.
- Benjamin Vincent (1910), "Athens", Haydn's Dictionary of Dates (25th ed.), London: Ward, Lock & Co.
- Frank J. Costa; et al. (1991). "Evolving Planning Systems in Madrid, Rome, and Athens". GeoJournal. 24 (3): 293–303. Bibcode:1991GeoJo..24..293C. doi:10.1007/BF00189030. JSTOR 41145202.
- Kathryn A. Kozaitis (1997). "'Foreigners Among Foreigners': Social Organization Among The Roma Of Athens, Greece". Urban Anthropology and Studies of Cultural Systems and World Economic Development. 26 (2): 165–199. JSTOR 40553322.
- Michael Llewellyn-Smith (2004). "Chronology". Athens: A Cultural and Literary History. USA: Interlink Books. ISBN 978-1-56656-540-0.
- Konstantinos Serraos; et al. (2009). "Planning culture and the interference of major events: the recent experience of Athens". In Jörg Knieling and Frank Othengrafen (ed.). Planning Cultures in Europe: Decoding Cultural Phenomena in Urban and Regional Planning. Ashgate. ISBN 978-0-7546-7565-5.
- Denis Roubien (2016). "Planning the Public Functions of Nineteenth-Century Athens: Setting the Priorities between Idealism and Practical Needs". Journal of Urban History. 42.
