= Mitromaras =

Greek rebel and pirate

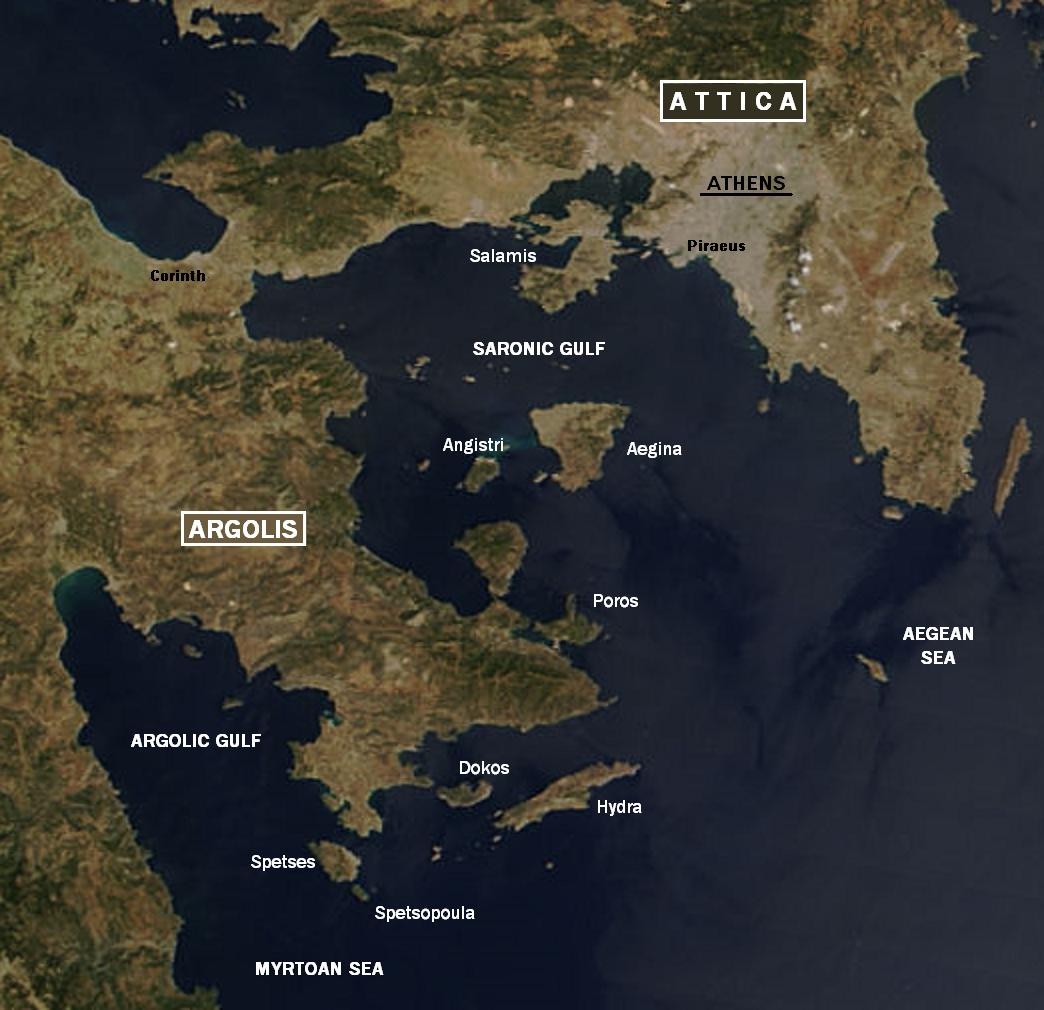
The Saronic Gulf and its environs, where Mitromaras was active in 1770–1772

Mitromaras (Greek: Μητρομάρας) was a Greek rebel and pirate who took part in the Orlov Revolt (1770).

Mitromaras hailed from the area of Mesogeia, in Attica. Following the arrival of the Russian fleet in the Aegean Sea, of which he knew in advance, he raised a revolt in Attica and the Megarid, gathering an armed following of local Greeks and Arvanites, and attacking the estates of local Turks. His followers became known as λεμπέσηδες, from a Turkish word indicating a guerrilla or outlaw, but which was usually applied to Albanian bands hired to guard specific locations.

In 1770 at Kakia Skala, Mitromaras' men defeated an Ottoman detachment of 100 men under the garrison commander of Athens, the boluk-bashi Islam, and in its aftermath sacked and torched the town of Megara. Mitromaras also captured the offshore Salamis Island, where he moved the families of his followers for safety. Resorting to piracy to sustain his followers and their families, at one point he pursued a French merchant vessel until Syros with thirty of his men, where the local Catholic population repulsed the attack and even wounded him.

Despite the failure of the Russian-instigated revolt in the Morea by 1771, Mitromaras did not give up, but raised the Russian flag and raided the Saronic Gulf and the nearby coasts and seas with a small flotilla. The coasts of Attica in particular suffered from this, and many Athenians fled to Salamis to escape Ottoman reprisals. The raids ventured inland as well: on one occasion Mitromaras' men waylaid men bringing money to the governor of Athens, and returned Salamis with the treasure. To escape reprisals, the Athenian elders interceded and the money was returned. In May 1771, Mitromaras defeated another force of 100 Albanian soldiers sent from Nauplia to reinforce Athens.

During one such raid, Mitromaras was heavily wounded, and died at the islet of Angistri on 15 February 1772. At the same time, many of his men and their families, as well as Mitromaras' wife, were taken captive and brought to Athens. The men were executed and the women sold into slavery. The remainder of Mitromaras' followers dispersed across Greece, bringing the name λεμπέσης with them, which thus became a common surname.

== Sources ==
- Kargakos, Sarantos I. (1999). Αλβανοί, Αρβανίτες, Ελληνες (in Greek). Athens: I. Sideris. ISBN 9789600801729.
- Vakalopoulos, Apostolos E. (1973). Ιστορία του νέου ελληνισμού, Τόμος Δ': Τουρκοκρατία 1669–1812 – Η οικονομική άνοδος και ο φωτισμός του γένους [History of modern Hellenism, Volume IV: Turkish rule 1669–1812 – Economic upturn and enlightenment of the nation] (in Greek) (Second ed.). Thessaloniki: Emm. Sfakianakis.
