= Lembesis =

Lembesis or Lebesis (Greek: Λεμπέσης) is a Greek surname, deriving from a Turkish word for Albanian irregular bands employed as guards during Ottoman rule, later used for the followers of the rebel Mitromaras. Notable people with the surname include:

- Angelos Lembesi (1917–1988), Greek skier
- Polychronis Lembesis (1848–1913), Greek painter
- Spyridon Lebesis (born 1987), Greek javelin thrower

== Bibliography ==
- Great Greek Encyclopedia," Vol. C (Supplement), p. 589.
