= Meletius of Jerusalem =

Greek Orthodox Patriarch of Jerusalem

His Beatitude Meletius
- Patriarch of Jerusalem
- Church: Greek Orthodox Church of Jerusalem
- See: Jerusalem
- Installed: 1731
- Term ended: 1737
- Predecessor: Chrysanthus
- Successor: Parthenius

Meletius was Greek Orthodox Patriarch of Jerusalem (1731–1737). He was born in Turkey.

Religious titles
| Preceded by Chrysanthus | Greek Orthodox Patriarch of Jerusalem; 1731–1737 | Succeeded by Parthenius |
