= Parthenius of Jerusalem =

Parthenius (died 1770) was Greek Orthodox Patriarch of Jerusalem (1737 – October 28, 1766). He was born in Athens.

He attended the Council of Constantinople in 1755.

Religious titles
Preceded by Meletius	Greek Orthodox Patriarch of Jerusalem; 1737–1766	Succeeded by Ephram II
