= Ephram II of Jerusalem =

Greek writer

His Beatitude Ephram II
- Patriarch of Jerusalem
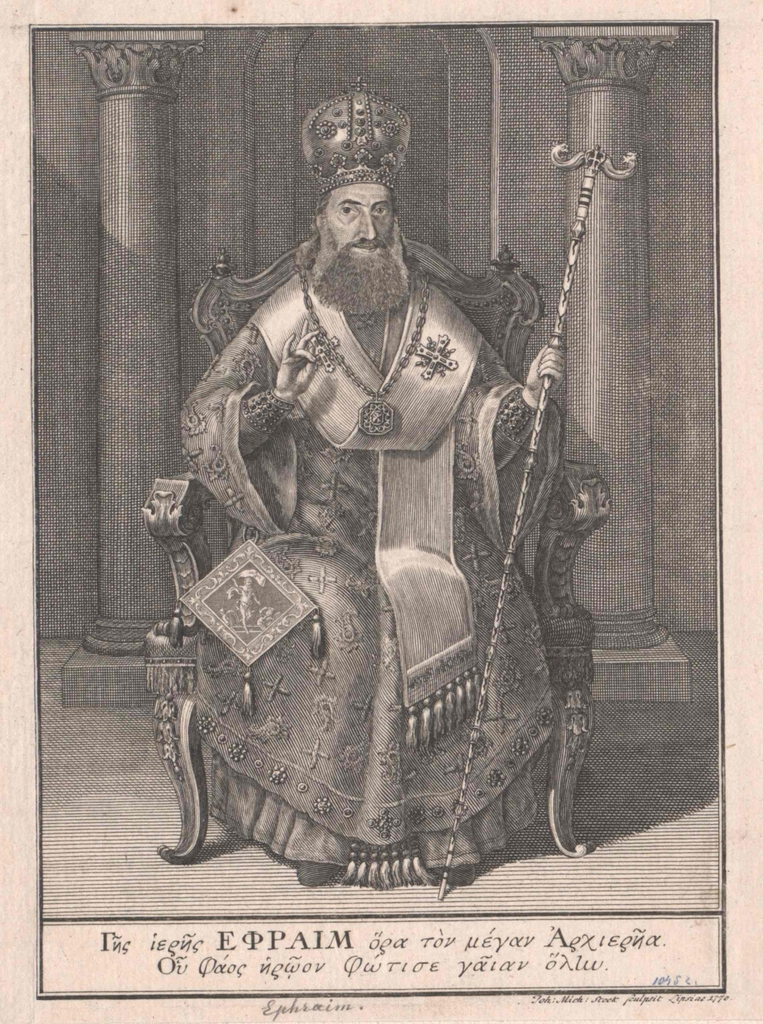
- Ephram II of Jerusalem
- Church: Greek Orthodox Church of Jerusalem
- See: Jerusalem
- Installed: 1766
- Term ended: April 26, 1770
- Predecessor: Parthenius
- Successor: Sophronius V

Personal details
- Born: Athens, Ottoman Empire
- Died: 1770

Ephram II (died 1770) was a Greek writer. He was born in Athens. He was Greek Orthodox Patriarch of Jerusalem (1766 – April 26, 1770).

Religious titles
Preceded by Parthenius	Greek Orthodox Patriarch of Jerusalem; 1766–1770	Succeeded by Sophronius V
