= Timeline of the Palestine region =

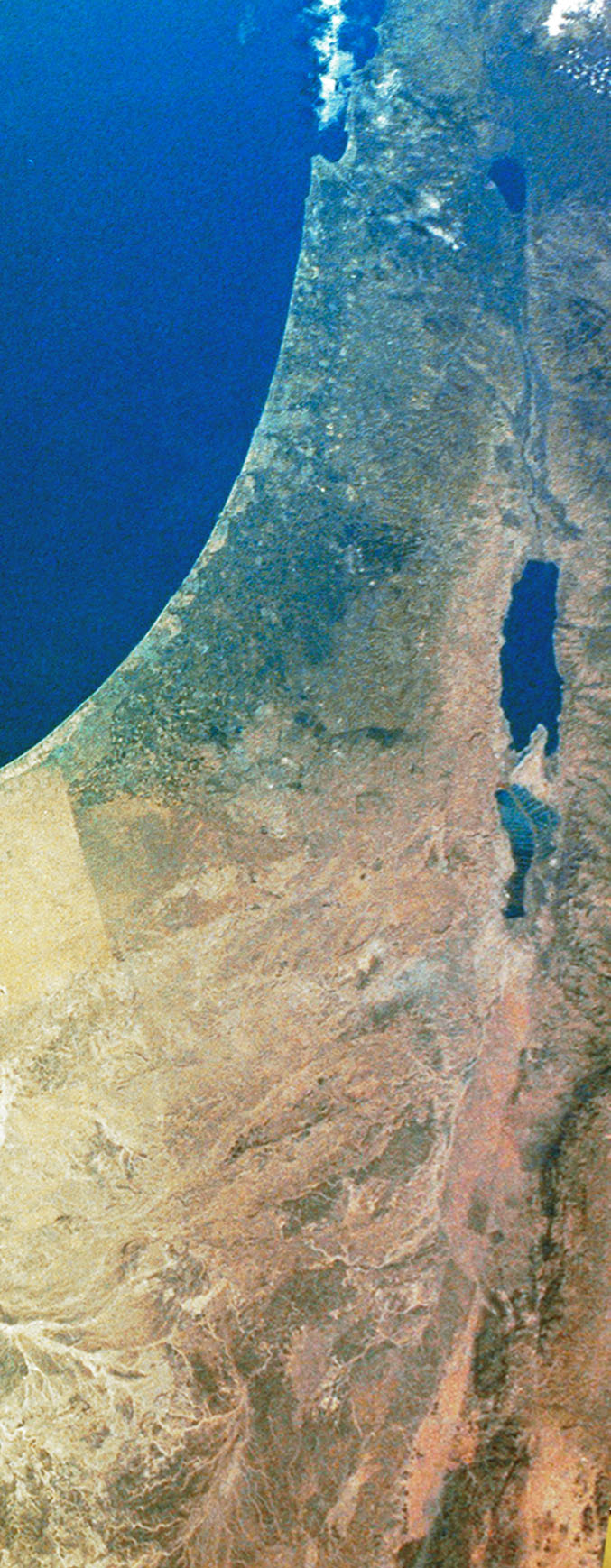
Satellite image of the Palestine region from 2003

The timeline of the Palestine region is a timeline indicating the commonly used archaeological periods and historical periods of the region of Palestine, with the major events during each of them. For more details on the history of Palestine see History of Palestine. In cases where the year or month is uncertain, it is marked with a slash, for example 636/7 and January/February.

== Mesozoic/Cenozoic geological eras ==
- c. 65–70 million BCE – A Prognathodon dies in the Negev region; its complete skull was discovered in a phosphate mine in the Negev in 1993.

== Palaeolithic ==
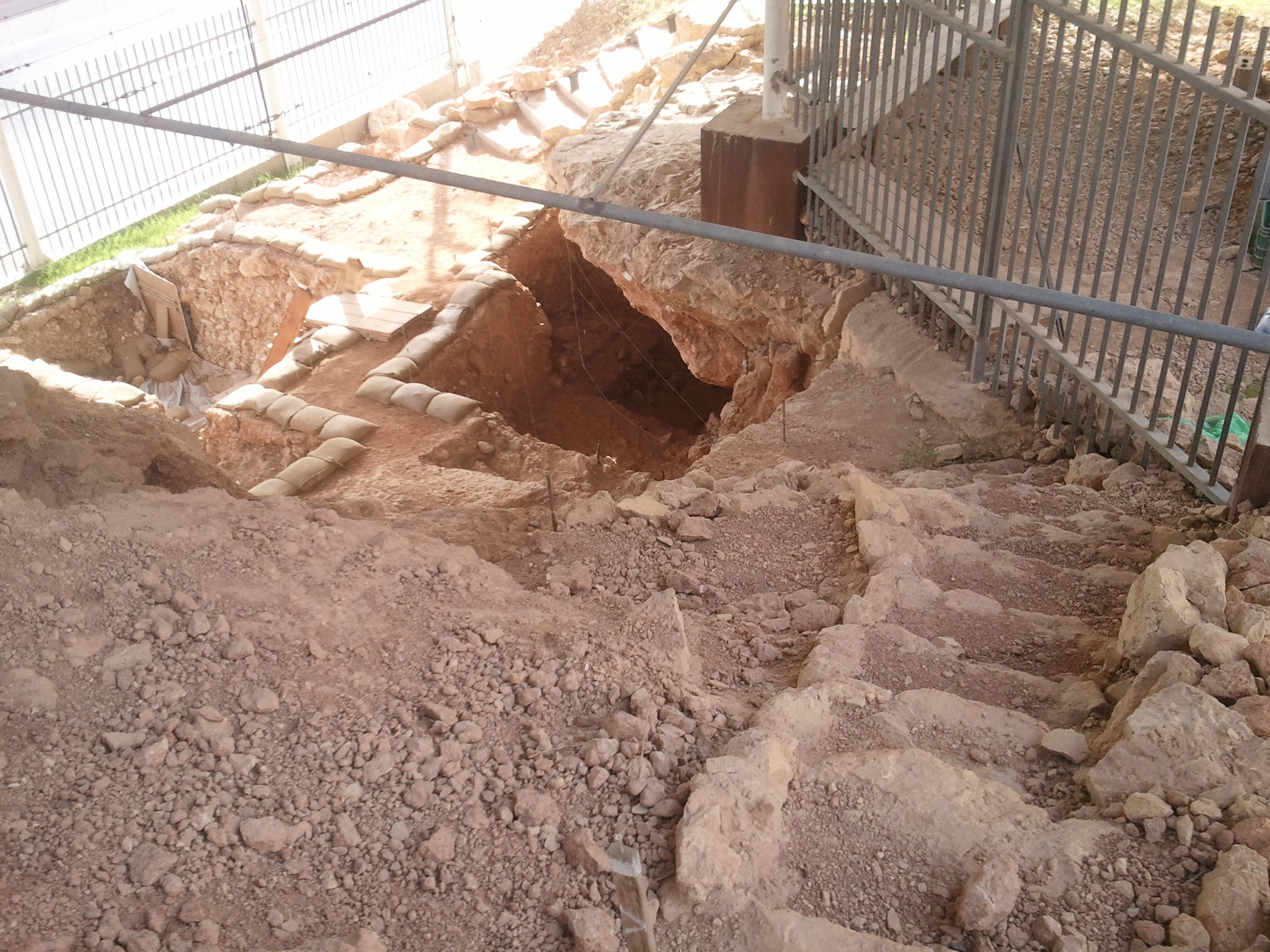
The Qesem Cave was occupied by prehistoric humans at approximately 420,000–220,000 BCE .

- 420–220 ka BP – archaic humans occupy the Qesem Cave.

== Epipalaeolithic ==
- c. 9000 BCE – Natufian hunter-gatherer groups form a permanent settlement that would come to be known as Jericho.

== Neolithic ==
Neolithic (8,500–4,500 BCE).

- Pre-Pottery Neolithic (PPN)
  - Pre-Pottery Neolithic A (PPNA)
  - Pre-Pottery Neolithic B (PPNB)
  - Pre-Pottery Neolithic C (PPNC)
- Pottery Neolithic (PN)

== Chalcolithic (Copper Age) ==
Chalcolithic (4,500–3,500 BCE).

== Bronze Age; Canaanite city-states ==
=== Early Bronze Age ===
Early Bronze Age (3,500–2,350 BCE).

- 34th century BCE – Taur Ikhbeineh was inhabited
- c. 3300 BCE – The Egyptian city of Tell es-Sakan was established. It is the earliest fortified Egyptian settlement identified through archaeological excavation.
- c. 3000 BCE – Tell es-Sakan was abandoned.
- c. 2600 BCE – Tell es-Sakan was reinhabited by the Canaanites.
- c. 2250 BCE – The Canaanite settlement of Tell es-Sakan was abandoned.

=== Intermediate Bronze Age ===
Intermediate Bronze Age (2,350–2000 BCE).

=== Middle Bronze Age ===
Middle Bronze Age (2000–1550 BCE).

=== Late Bronze Age ===
Late Bronze Age (1550–1200 BCE).

- c. 1469 BCE – In the Battle of Megiddo, Egyptian forces under the command of Pharaoh Thutmose III defeat a large Canaanite coalition under the king of Kadesh.

== Iron Age; Israelite kingdoms and Philistine pentapolis ==
=== Iron Age I ===
Iron Age I (1200–1000 BCE).

IAI can be split into Iron Age IA (1200–1150 BCE) and Iron Age IB (1150–1000 BCE).

=== Iron Age II ===
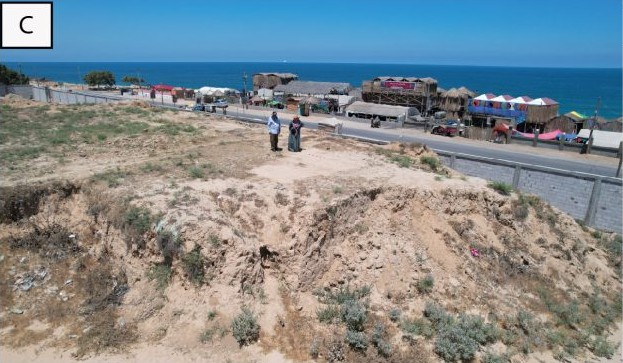
The summit of Tell Ruqeish during an archaeological survey in 2022

Iron Age II (1000–586 BCE).

IAII can be split into Iron Age IIA (1000–900 BCE), Iron Age IIB (900–700 BCE), and Iron Age IIC (700–586 BCE).

- 925 BCE – Sack of Jerusalem (925 BC) – Pharaoh Sheshonk I of the Third Intermediate Period invades Canaan following the Battle of Bitter Lakes. Possibly the same as Shishak, the Pharaoh mentioned in the Bible in the book of Kings 1, who captured and pillaged Jerusalem (1 Kings 14: 25).
- 853 BCE – The Battle of Qarqar in which Jerusalem's forces were likely involved in an indecisive battle against Shalmaneser III of Neo-Assyria (Jehoshaphat King of Judah was allied with Ahab King of the Israel according to the Jewish Bible).
- Second half of the 8th century BCE – The fortified settlement of Tell Ruqeish was established.
- c. 720 BCE – The Kingdom of Israel is conquered by Neo-Assyrian Empire and parts of the local population is deported and replaced with deportees from other parts of the empire.

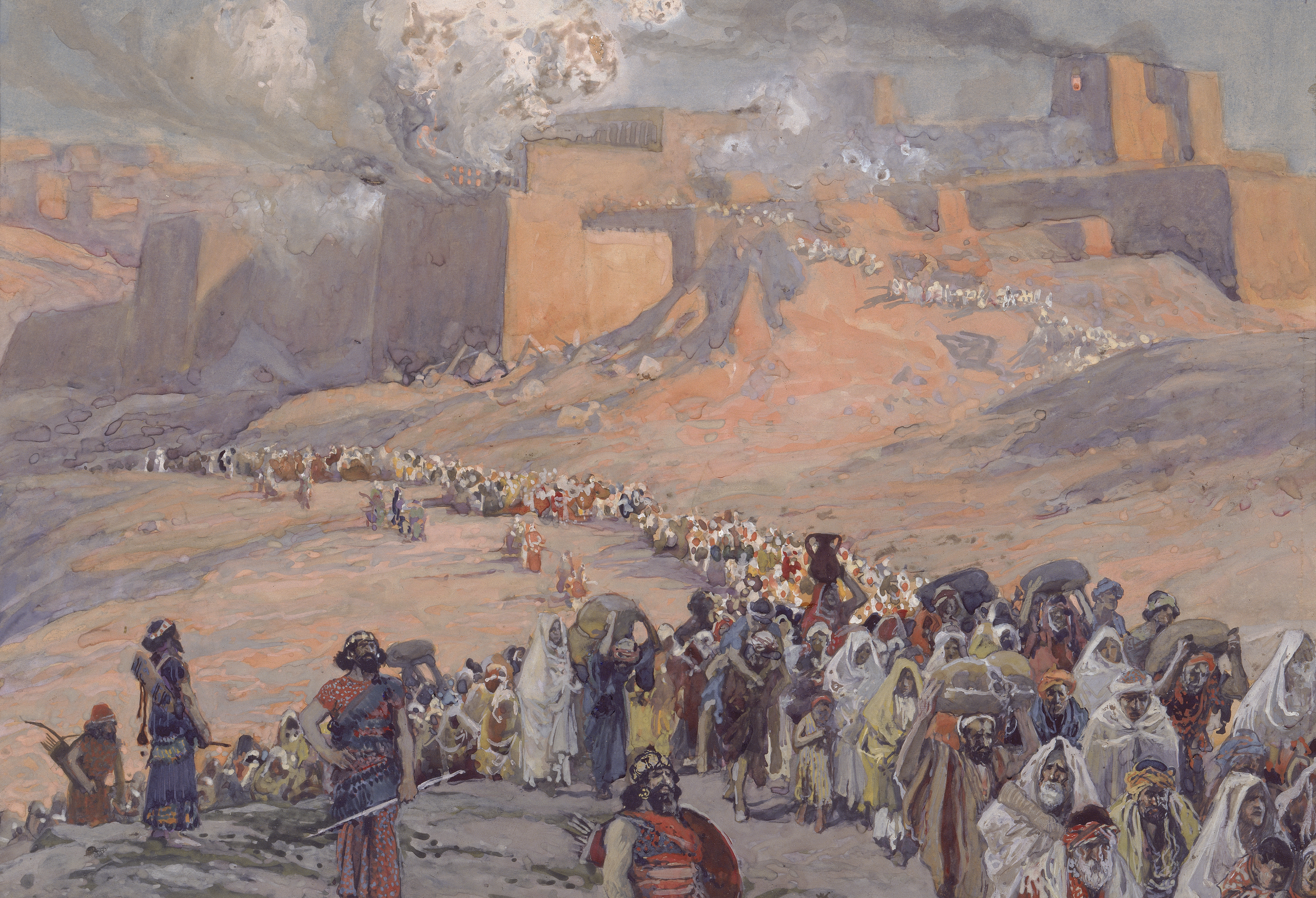
The Babylonian captivity (painting by James Tissot from c. 1896 to 1902)

== Babylonian and Persian periods ==
The Babylonian period began with the destruction of Jerusalem by Nebuchadnezzar II in 587 or 586 BCE. The Persian period spans the years 539–332 BCE, from the time Cyrus II of Persia ("the Great") conquered the Neo-Babylonian Empire, to the conquest of the region by Alexander the Great.

== Hellenistic period and Hasmonean Judea ==
The Hellenistic period began with Alexander the Great's conquest of Palestine in 332 BCE and ended with Pompey's conquest of Hasmonean Judea in 63 BCE. Alternatively, it can be considered to end with the victory of Rome's client king, Herod the Great, over the last Hasmonean king of Judea in 37 BCE. After Alexander's death, Palestine was part of Ptolemaic Egypt until being conquered by the Seleucids.

- c. 260 BCE – Beit She'an is refounded as the poleis Scythopolis by Ptolemy II Philadelphus.
- 200 BCE – The Seleucid emperor Antiochus III the Great conquers Palestine.
- 175 BCE:
  - Seleucus IV (r. 187 BCE – 175 BCE) dies and is succeeded by Antiochus, son of Seleucus IV.
  - Antiochus IV Epiphanes (r. 175 BCE – 164 BCE) becomes the Seleucid emperor.
- 174 BCE – Antiochus appoints Jason as high priest of the Jerusalem Temple.
- 172 BCE – Antiochus replaces Jason with Menelaus as high priest of the Jerusalem Temple as the latter offers to pay a much bigger tribute.
- Late 170 BCE/early 169 BCE – Antiochus invades Egypt but decides to return. Perhaps because of disturbances in Palestine. His return is triumphant and he brings many spoils.
- 169 BCE, autumn – On his way back from Egypt, Antiochus raids the Jerusalem Temple and confiscates its treasures.
- 168 BCE, spring – Antiochus invades Egypt but the Romans force him to withdraw. Meanwhile, rumors spread in Judea that the king has died and Jason launches a surprise attack on Jerusalem, captures the city, and kills supporters of his rival Menelaus. Antiochus interprets Jason's attack as a rebellion and sends an army that retakes Jerusalem and drives Jason's followers away.
- 167 BCE, autumn – Antiochus IV Epiphanes outlaws Judaism in Judea and allows pagan worship at the Jerusalem temple.
- 165 BCE, spring – Antiochus campaigns against the Parthians.
- 164 BCE:
  - spring – Antiochus issues a letter repealing the ban on Judaism and promising amnesty for the insurgents who return before March 164. The provincial land-tax from 167 BCE is abolished. The Maccabees does not take up the Seleucids offer and the insurgency continues.
  - summer – The Maccabees carries out a number of punitive expeditions, likely led by Judas, against people who had participated in the persecution against Jews.
  - autumn/winter – Judas enters Jerusalem and the altar to Zeus and other pagan artifacts are removed from the Temple. Meanwhile, Antiochus dies in Persis, igniting a century-long war of succession in Antioch, the capital of the Seleucid empire.
- 161 BCE – Judas Maccabeus is killed in battle and his army is routed.
- 152 BCE – Jonathan Apphus is appointed high priest of the Jerusalem temple by the Seleucids.
- c. 145 BCE – The Seleucid ruler Demetrius II Nicator lets Judea annex the three southern Samarian districts Lydda, Aphairema, and Ramathaim.
- 135/4 BCE – John Hyrcanus becomes Hasmonean ruler and high priest.
- 129 BCE – The Seleucid emperor Antiochus VII Sidetes dies.
- c. 112–107 BCE – The Hasmoneans destroy the Samaritan temple at Mount Gerizim and devastate Shechem.
- c. 108/7 BCE – The Hasmoneans destroy Scythopolis.
- 104 BCE – Aristobulus I succeeds Hyrcanus as king of Judea.
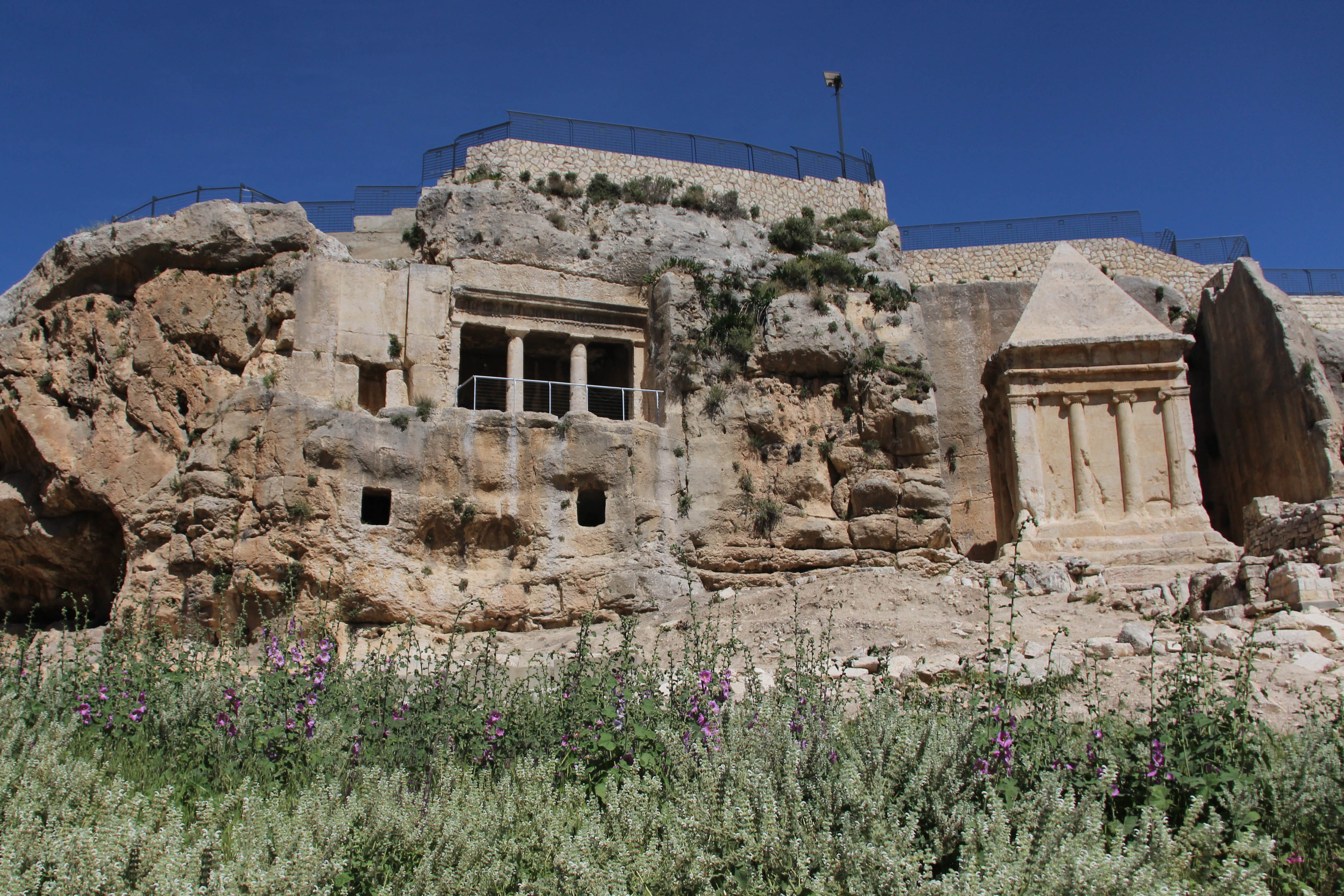
  Tomb of Benei Hezir and the Tomb of Zechariah, Jerusalem
- 103 BCE – Alexander Jannaeus succeeds Aristobulus. He greatly extends the Hasmonean kingdom, concentrating on Greek cities along the Palestinian coast.
- 76 BCE – Salome Alexandra succeeds Alexander Jannaeus as monarch. Hyrcanus II becomes High Priest.
- 67–63 BCE – Hasmonean civil war: Salome Alexandra dies. Her elder son Hyrcanus II initially succeeded to the royal throne, but his brother Aristobulus II secures the army's backing to take the throne. After briefly accepting a powerless role, Hyrcanus fled into exile on the advice of Antipater the Idumaean, securing an alliance with Aretas III of Nabatea. Their joint army then besieged Jerusalem until forced to withdraw under threat of Roman intervention.

== Roman period ==
The Roman period lasted from Pompey's conquest of Judea in 63 BCE, until the legal establishment of Christianity in the realm. Suggestions for the end date vary between the Edict of Milan in 313 CE by which Constantine the Great and co-emperor Licinius declare Christianity a permitted religion, and the declaration of Nicene Christianity as the sole state religion by three co-emperors including Theodosius, emperor of the East, through the Edict of Thessalonica of 380; 324, the year Constantine became sole ruler, is often preferred. The Roman period is split into Early and Late sub-periods, separated by the end of the Bar Kokhba Revolt, some authors adding a Middle one.

=== Early Roman period ===
- 63 BCE – After both Hasmonean brothers appealed to the Roman Republic to settle their dispute, Roman general Pompey the Great invades Hasmonean Judea, conquers Jerusalem after a three-month siege, and reinstates Hyrcanus II as high priest and client ruler while denying him the kingship. The territory of the Hasmonean state is reduced.
- 1st century BC – The earliest known burials at the Ard-al-Moharbeen necropolis were created.
- 57–54 BCE – Scythopolis is rebuilt by the Roman proconsul Gabinius.
- 47 BCE:
  - Herod the Great, son of Antipater the Idumaean, is appointed governor of Galilee.
  - Herod clears out Hezekiah's "brigands," who had been harassing people in southern Syria.
- 40 BCE:
  - The Parthians invade Judea, seize Jerusalem, and appoint Antigonus II Mattathias of the Hasmonean dynasty as King of Judea.
  - Herod visits Rome to seek Mark Antony's support. He is appointed king by the Roman senate.
- 37 BCE – Herod the Great conquers Judea with the help of Roman and Jewish troops. Antigonus II Mattathias, who had barricaded himself in the city, is beheaded by Mark Antony.
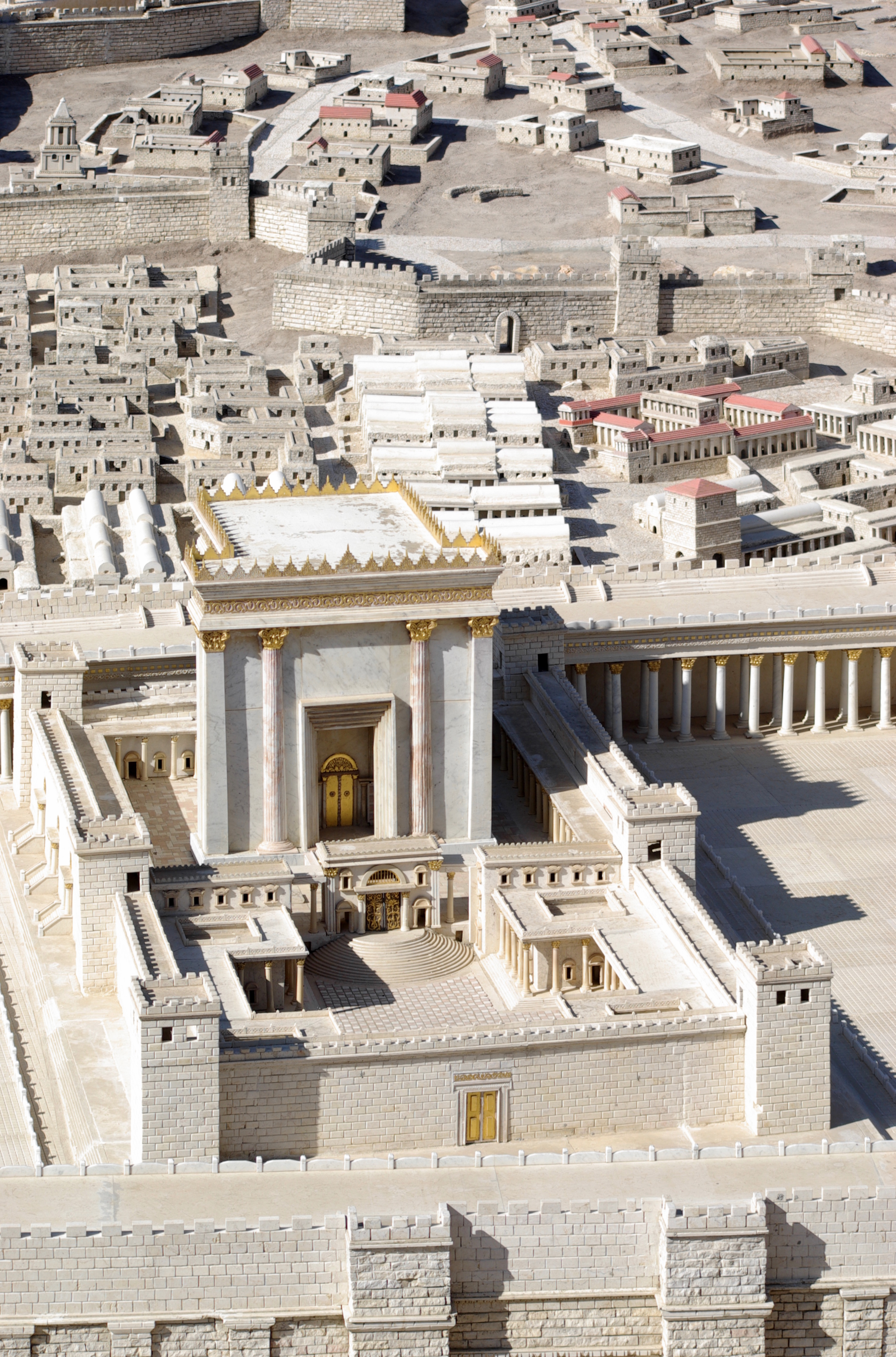
  Detail from the Holyland model of Jerusalem, showing the Second Temple after Herod's massive expansion, Israel Museum
- 31 BCE – 31 BC Judea earthquake. A powerful earthquake occurs in Judea.
- 27 BCE – King Herod rebuilds Samaria and renames it Sebastia.
- 23 BCE – King Herod builds a palace and fortress called Herodium, about 7.5 miles (12 km) south of Jerusalem.
- 22 BCE – Herod begins construction of a new city and harbor called Caesarea Maritima at the old settlement Straton's Tower.
- 20 BCE:
  - Herod is awarded large swathes of northern territory by emperor Augustus to add to his kingdom.
  - Citizens of Gadara appeal to Augustus to be excluded from Herod's kingdom.
- 19 BCE – King Herod the Great further extends the Temple Mount's natural plateau and rebuilds the temple.
- c. 10 BCE – Caesarea is completed.
- 7 BCE - Herod has his two sons, Alexander and Aristobulus, executed.
- 7–2 BCE – Birth of Jesus.
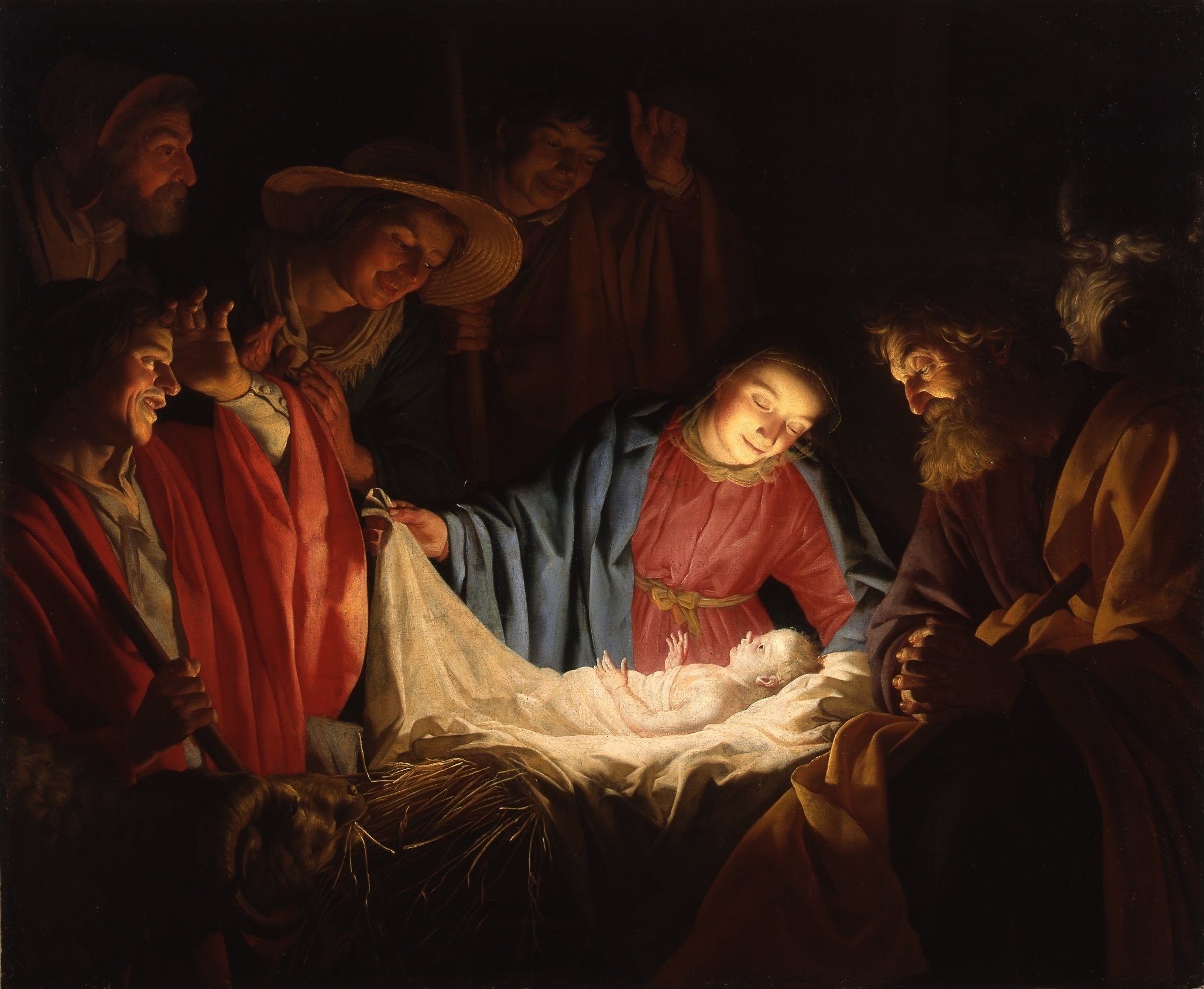
  Birth of Jesus (painting by Gerard van Honthorst from 1622)
- 4 BCE Herod dies and his kingdom becomes a tetrarchy divided between four members of his family: his sons Herod Archelaus, Herod Antipas, and Philip; as well as his sister Salome I.
- 6 CE:
  - Leading Jews and Samaritans ask Augustus to remove Herod Archelaus from the throne. He obliges and Archelaus is deposed and exiled. His territory, consisting of Judea, Samaria, and Idumea, is organized into the Roman district Iudaea.
  - First Roman census of Judea.
- c. 20 – Tiberias in Galilee is founded by Herod Antipas, one of Herod the Great's successors.
- 26–33 – Jesus is crucified.
- 37 – Herod Philip dies.
- 39 – Antipas is removed from his post and banished to Gaul. Herod Agrippa I receives his territories.
- 41 – Agrippa I becomes king of parts of the Herodian kingdom which, in 6 CE, had been divided by Herod's sons.
- 44 – Herod Agrippa I dies. Judea comes under direct Roman administration.
- 62–64 – Completion of the rebuilding of the Jerusalem Temple begun by Herod.

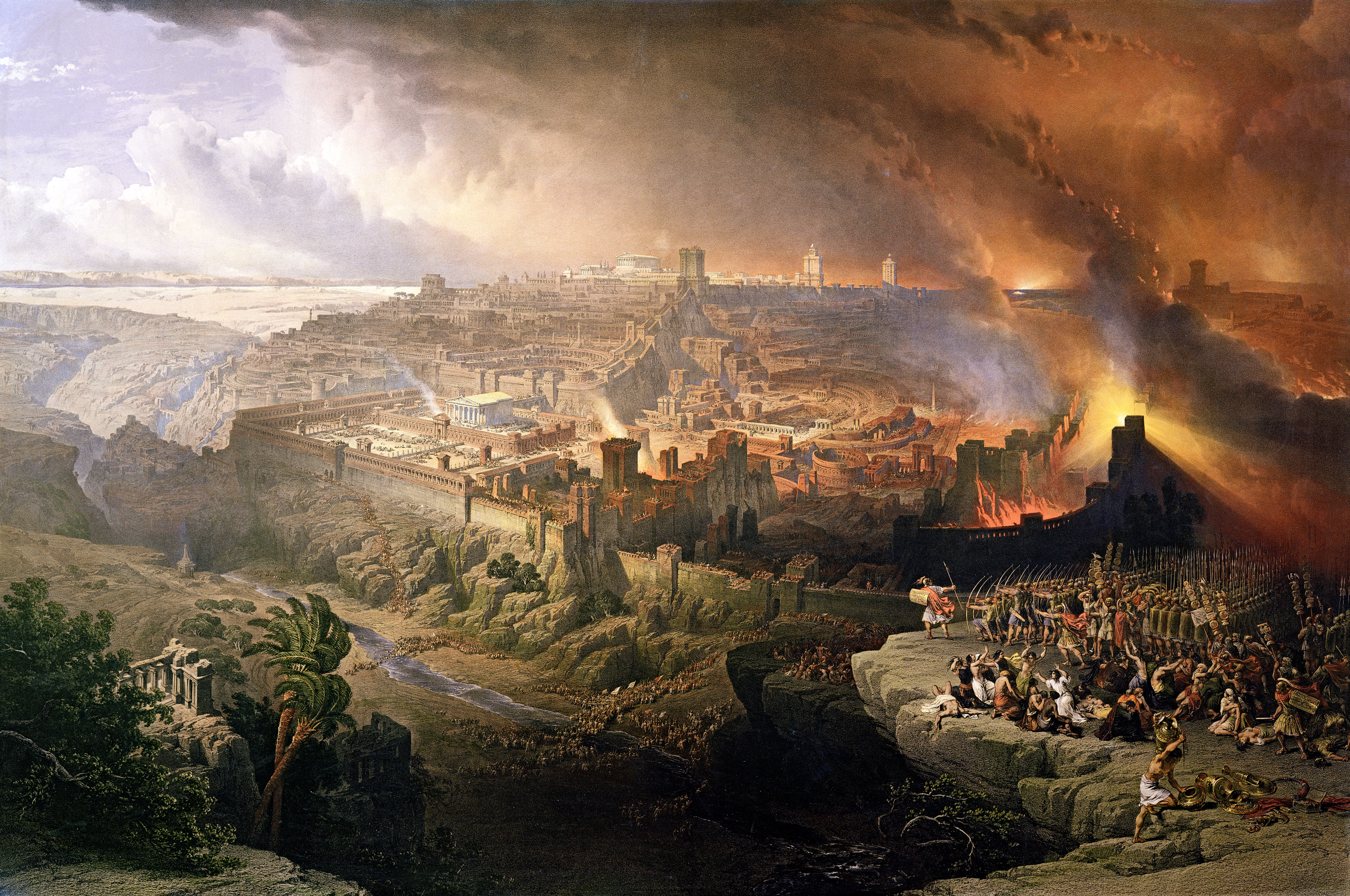
The destruction of the Jewish Temple in a painting by David Roberts from 1850)

- 66–70 – First Jewish revolt:
  - 66 – The revolt breaks out in the summer. Cestius Gallus, governor of Syria, besieges Jerusalem in the autumn but abruptly aborts the siege. During their retreat, his troops suffer a crushing defeat by Jewish forces at Bethoron.
  - 67 – Galilee campaign: Led by generals Vespasian and his older son, Titus, Roman legions systematically subdue rebel strongholds in the northern regions.
  - 69 – Vespasian is declared emperor and leaves for Rome. Titus takes command over the campaign.
  - 70 – During a five-month siege, Roman forces retake Jerusalem, razing the city and destroying the Second Temple.
  - 73/4 – The Romans capture Masada, the last rebel holdout.
- 70/1 – Provincia Iudaea is established.
- 2nd century – The latest known burials at the Ard-al-Moharbeen necropolis were created.
- 106 – The Romans annex Nabataea, reorganizing it as the province of Arabia.
- 120 – First imperial road built through Galilee.
- 129/130 – The Roman emperor Hadrian visits Syria, Palestine, and Arabia, and founds the Roman colony Aelia Capitolina at Jerusalem. Presumably, the outbreak of the Bar Kokhba Revolt is directly linked to this event.
- 132–135 – Bar Kokhba Revolt: the Jews of Judaea, led by Simon bar Kokhba, rise again in rebellion. A rebel state is established. The Romans eventually crush the revolt, nearly depopulating Judea proper and banning Jews from living in Jerusalem and its vicinity.

=== Late Roman period ===
- 195 – The bishops of Caesarea and Jerusalem, Theophilus and Narcissus, preside over a council in Caesarea to settle a growing dispute over the proper date of the celebration of Easter.
- 222 – Caesarea becomes the metropolitan see for Palestine.
- 270 – Zenobia, ruler of the Palmyrene Empire, conquers most of the Roman east including Palestine.
- 272 – Palestine is recaptured by Rome.

== Byzantine/Christian Roman period ==
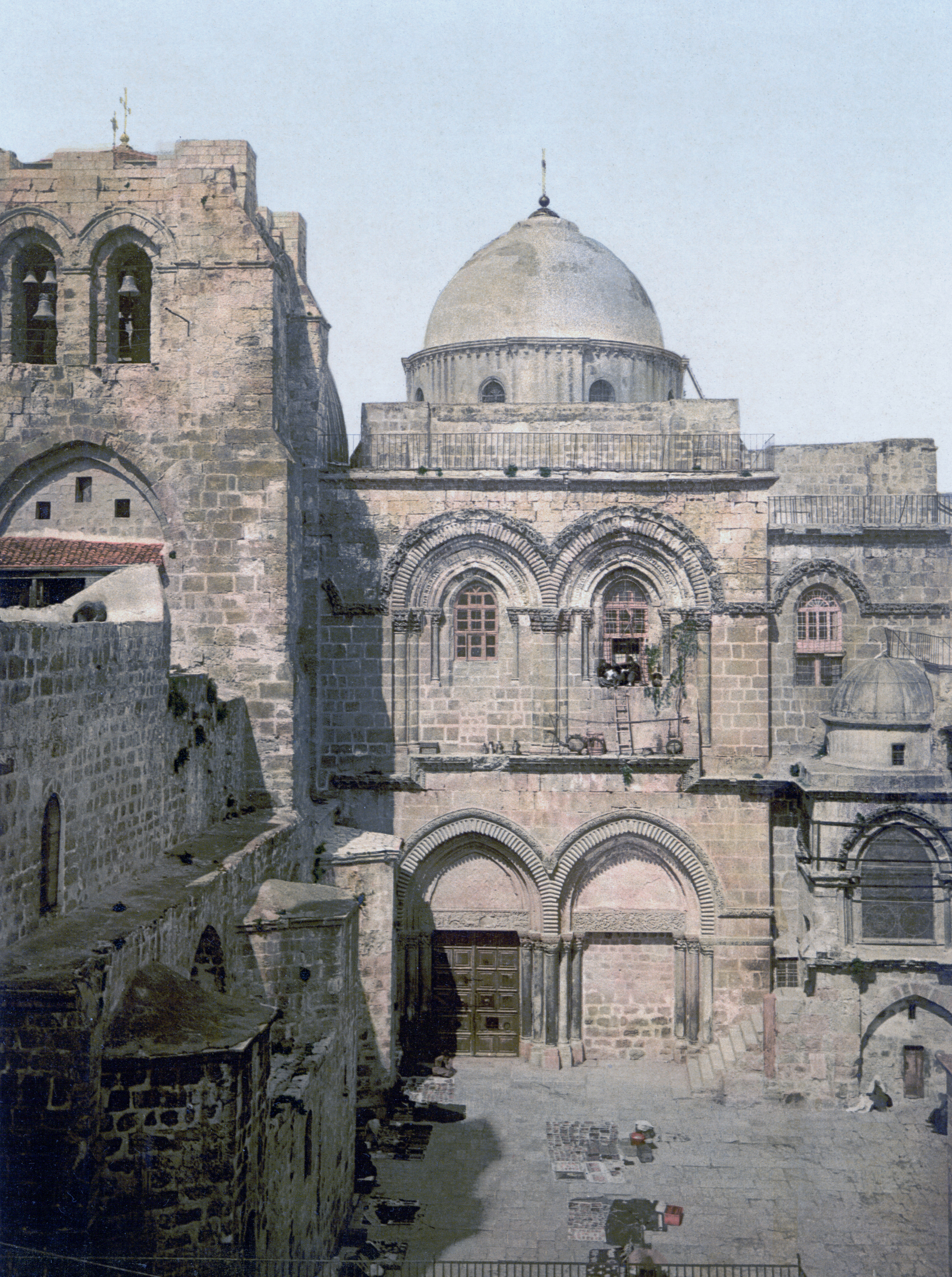
Church of the Holy Sepulchre (photo from 1900)

Allowing for varying starting dates (see above under Roman period), this timeline chooses for convenience's sake to set the starting year of the Byzantine period as 313, when Constantine declared Christianity a permitted religion. The period ends with the Muslim conquest of Palestine in 637–641.

- 313 – Roman co-emperors Constantine I and Licinius declare that Christianity is an acceptable religion.
- 324 – Constantine—having defeated Emperor Maximian, Caesar of the Western Roman Empire at the Battle of the Milvian Bridge—becomes the sole ruler of the re-united Roman Empire with its capital at Byzantium (New Rome). Queen Helena, a devout Christian, wife of Western Roman Emperor Constantius Chlorus and mother of Constantine the Great, departs for the Holy Land and begins the construction of churches.
- 326–333 – Concurrent construction of the world's first 4 state-sponsored purpose-built churches under the tutelage of Constantine and Helena: the Church of the Nativity is built in Bethlehem, marking the site where according to Christian tradition Jesus was born; "Eleona" (Greek: Olive) on the Mount of Olives in Jerusalem, also called "Chapel of the Apostles", marking the site where, according to Christian tradition, Jesus ascended to heaven; the Church of the Holy Cross, later called the Church of the Resurrection and Church of the Holy Sepulchre, is built in Jerusalem around the hill of Golgotha, marking the site where, according to Christian tradition, Jesus was crucified, buried, and resurrected; and the basilica of St. George at Mamre (Ramat el-Khalil), near Hebron.
- c. 350 – The Christian monk Hilarion founds the first church in Haluza and converts a large portion of the population.
- 351/2 – Jewish revolt centered around Sepphoris against the Caesar of the Byzantine (Eastern Roman) Emperor Constantius Gallus. The revolt is quickly subdued by Gallus' general Ursicinus.
- c. 357 – Palestine is divided into the provinces Palaestina Prima and Palaestina Salutaris.
- 361–363 – Roman emperor Julian the Apostate orders Alypius of Antioch to rebuild the Jewish Temple.
- 363 – An earthquake with its epicenter in the Galilee rocks Palestine. The earthquake results in, among other things, a halt in the construction of the Jewish Temple, mainly because it ruins the early stages of the construction. Ultimately the plan to rebuild the Temple is scrapped after the death of emperor Julian in June 363.
- 374/5 – Melania the Elder founds a monastery on the Mount of Olives which also functions as a hostel for pilgrims.
- c. 400 – Palestine proper is split into the provinces Palaestina Prima and Palaestina Secunda. Palaestina Salutaris is renamed Palaestina Tertia.
- 425 – The Sanhedrin is disbanded by the Byzantine Empire.

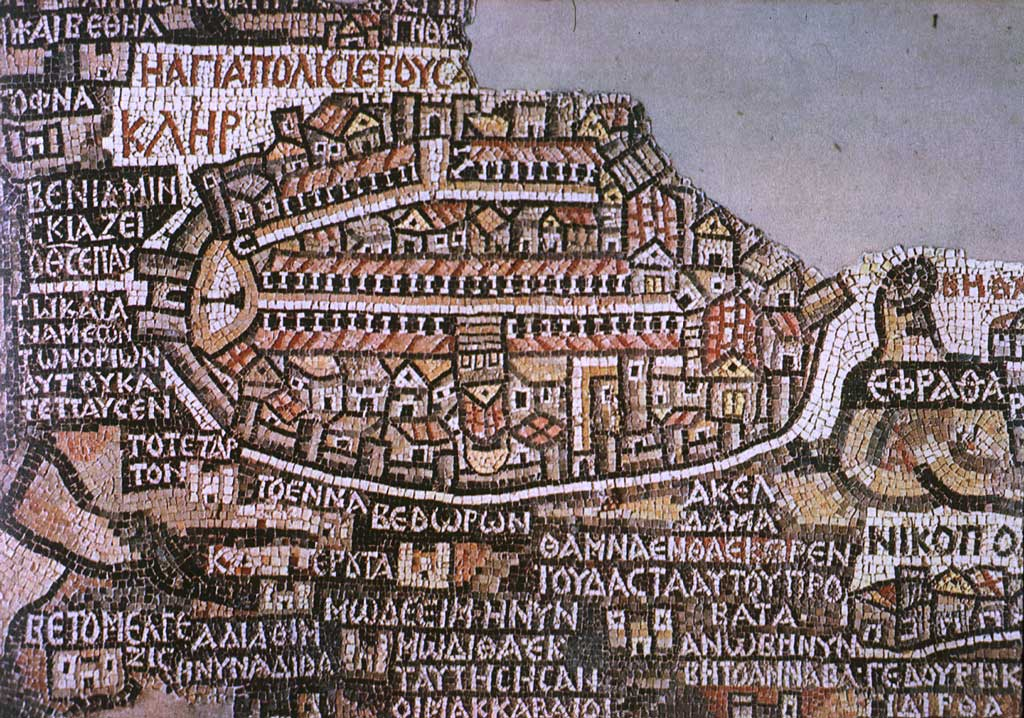
The Madaba Map depiction of 6th-century Jerusalem

- 438-439 – Empress Aelia Eudocia Augusta visits Jerusalem for the first time.
- 451 – The Council of Chalcedon declares that Jerusalem shall be a patriachate.
- 484 – Samaritans revolt as Emperor Zeno has a church built on their holy mountain, Gerizim.
- 529 – The Samaritans rebel against the Romans. Samaritanism loses its religio licita status as punishment.
- 541/2 – The bubonic plague sweeps Palestine.
- 555/6 – Uprising by Samaritans and Jews centered around Caesarea.
- 571 – Muhammad, founder of Islam, is born in Mecca.
- 613 – The Sasanian Empire (Persian Empire) captures several Palestinian cities on the coast.
- 614 May – The Sasanian Empire under general Shahrbaraz captures and sacks Jerusalem; the Church of the Holy Sepulchre is damaged by fire and the True Cross is captured.
- 629 – Byzantine Emperor Heraclius retakes Jerusalem after the decisive defeat of the Sassanid Empire at the Battle of Nineveh in 627. Heraclius personally returns the True Cross to the city.
- 634 February 4 – The Rashidun Caliphate defeats a 300-man-strong Byzantine force led by Dux Sergius at the Battle of Dathin, near Gaza.

== Early Muslim period ==
=== Rashidun period ===
- 637 (or 638) – Jerusalem falls to the armies of Rashidun caliph Umar Ibn el-Khatab. Jews are permitted to return to the city after 5 centuries of Roman rule.
  - June/July – The Rashiduns capture Gaza.
  - summer – Ascalon surrenders to the Rashiduns.
  - late – The Rashiduns and the Byzantines consent to a truce.
- 640 – The Rashiduns capture Caesarea.
- 641 – The Rashiduns capture Ashkelon, completing their conquest of the Holy Land.
- 659 – Earthquake.

=== Umayyad period ===
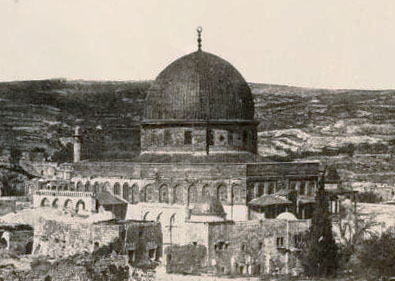
The Dome of the Rock (photograph from 1856)

- 661 – The Umayyad family takes control of the caliphate and moves its capital to Damascus, following the assassination of the Caliph Ali ibn Abi Talib.
- 687–691 – The Dome of the Rock is built on the Temple Mount in Jerusalem at the site where, according to Islam, Muhammad ascended to heaven.
- c. 715 – Sulayman ibn Abd al-Malik founds Ramla; it becomes the capital and administrative center of Palestine.
- 744:
  - February – Caliph Hisham ibn Abd al-Malik dies and is succeeded by Al-Walid II.
  - spring – Beginning of widespread mutinies against the Umayyads.
  - April – Caliph Al-Walid II is assassinated and succeeded by Yazid III.
  - October – Yazid III is assassinated and succeeded by Ibrahim ibn al-Walid.
  - November – Caliph Ibrahim is defeated in battle by Marwan II who becomes the new caliph.
- 745 – Theodore is appointed patriarch of Jerusalem.
- 749 January 18 – The Galilee earthquake destroys Tiberias, Scythopolis, Hippos, and Pella. Many other cities throughout the Jordan valley suffer heavy damage. Tens of thousands of lives are lost.
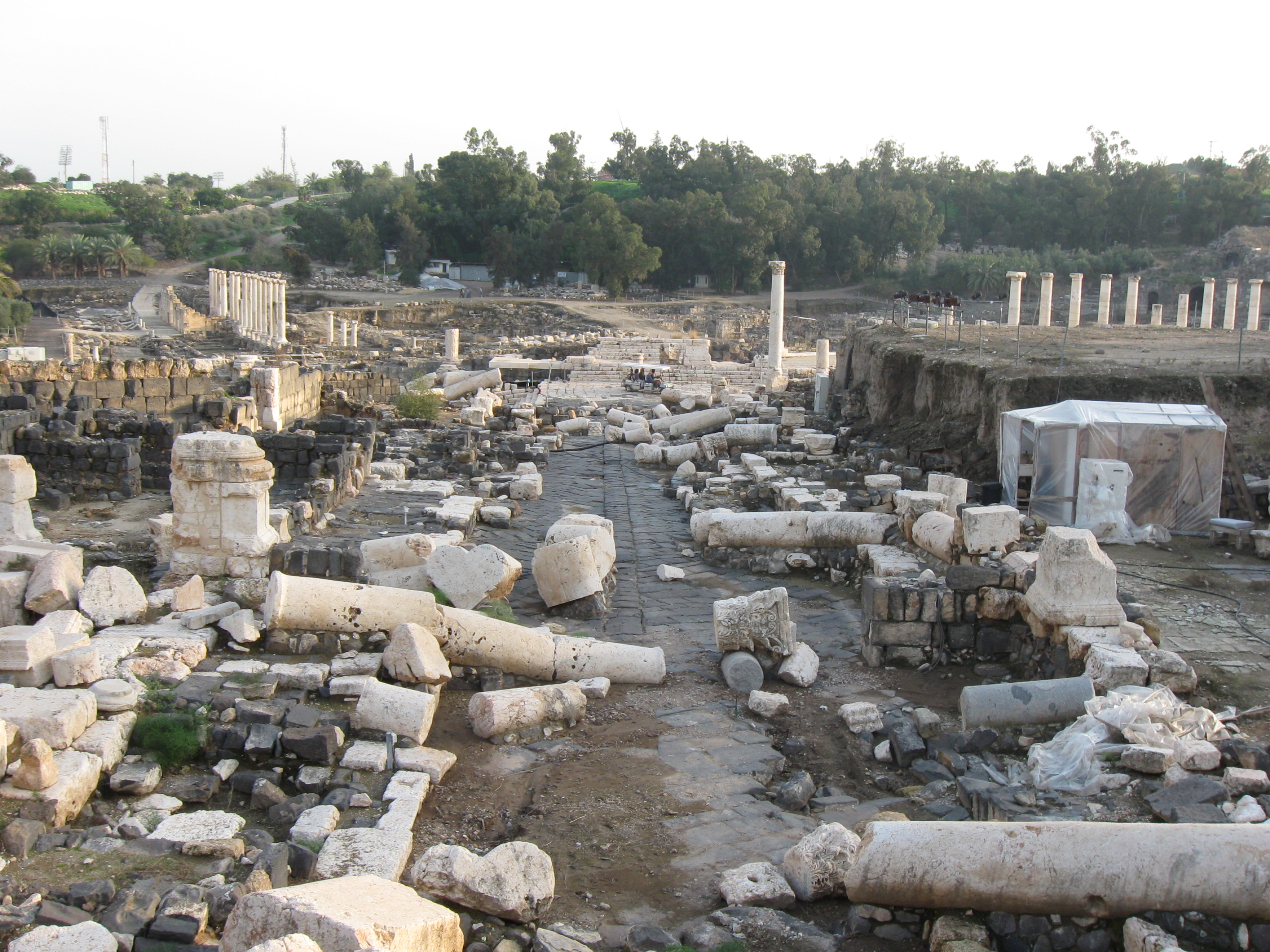
  Scythopolis (Beit She'an) was one of the cities destroyed during 749 Galilee earthquake

=== Abbasid period ===
- 747–750 – Civil war resulting in the overthrow of the Umayyads; the Abbasid family seize control of the caliphate.
- 758 – The Caliph Al-Mansur visits Jerusalem and possibly orders the renovation of the Dome of the Rock.
- 762 – The Abbasids found Baghdad and designate it the caliphate's new capital.
- 792/3 – War between the tribes of Palestine
- 796 – Battles between the tribes of Palestine.
- 799 – The Patriarch of Jerusalem sends a mission to the Frankish king Charlemagne and the latter returns the favor.
- c. 800 – The Jewish High Council, headed by Gaon, moves from Tiberias to Jerusalem.
- 800 – The Patriarch of Jerusalem sends another mission to Charlemagne carrying the keys to the Church of the Holy Sepulchre, together with a banner.
- 807 – A rebellion breaks out. Led by Abu'l-Nida', it has its epicenter in Eilat.
- 813 – Earthquake.
- c. 820 – The Church of the Holy Sepulchre is repaired.
- 820 – Basil is appointed patriarch of Jerusalem.
- 855 – Solomon is appointed patriarch of Jerusalem.
- 885 – The Abbasids reconquer Damascus.
- 873 – The governor of Egypt, Ahmad Ibn Tulun, breaks with the Abbasids and establishes independent rule.
- 878 – The Tulunids occupy most of the former Byzantine Diocese of the East, enabling them to defend Egypt against Abbasid attacks.
- 879 – Elias III is appointed patriarch of Jerusalem.
- c. 881 – Elias III of Jerusalem appeals to the Franks.
- c. 903 – Persian geographer Ibn al-Faqih visits Jerusalem.
- 905/6 – The Abbasids regain control of Palestine.
- 908/9 – Al-Muqtadir forbids Christians from serving in administrative positions.
- c. 913 – Spanish scholar Ibn Abd Rabbih visits Jerusalem.
- 935 – Al-Ikhshid takes control of Egypt and establishes independent rule.
- 937 March 26 – Rioting Muslims burn down the Church of the Resurrection and loot the Chapel of Golgotha.
- 939:
  - October 17 – Muhammad ibn Ra'iq conquers Ramla.
  - late – Battle of al-'Arish between Ibn Ra'iq and al-Ikhshid.
- 946 July – Sayf al-Dawla invades Palestine.
- 966 – A Muslim-Jewish mob torches the Church of Resurrection, plunders it, and kills Jerusalem's Patriarch John VII.

=== Fatimid period ===
- 969/70 – The Fatimids, a self-proclaimed Shia caliphate, defeat the Ikhshidids and appoint a Jewish governor.
- 971 – The Qarmatians attack Damascus.
  - September 5 – The Qarmatians conquer Ramla.
  - December – The Fatimids ward off a Qarmatian invasion near Fustat.
- 972 or 975 – Byzantine emperor John I Tzimiskes leads an expedition that reaches as far south as Caesarea and Tiberias in Palestine.
- 975:
  - winter – The Turkish officer Alptakin conquers Sidon and slaughters the population.
  - spring – Alptakin conquers Tiberias.
  - April – Alptakin conquers Damascus.
- 977 March 12 – Ramla is again conquered by the Qarmatians.
- 978:
  - Joseph II is appointed patriarch of Jerusalem.
  - August 15 – A massive Fatimid army defeats Alptakin and the Qarmatians in southern Palestine.
- 978–979 winter – The Jewish Fatimid general tries to negotiate with the leader of the Hamdanids, but their leader Abu Taghlib refuses because Fadl is a Jew. He later agrees to negotiations with Fadl who offers him Ramla in exchange for ousting the Jarrahids.
- 979 August – Abu Taghlib launches a failed offensive on Ramla and is taken captive and executed.
- 981:
  - June – Damascus is besieged by a Fatimid army.
  - July – The Bedouins, led by the Jarrahids, rebel against the Fatimids.
- 983 July 5 – Damascus is conquered by a Fatimid army.
- 984 – Orestes is appointed patriarch of Jerusalem.
- 991 February 24 – Ya'qub ibn Killis dies.
- 996–998 – Revolt in Tyre. The rebels call for and receive support from the Byzantines. The Fatimids put the city under siege and it falls in May 998. The rebel leader is tortured and crucified.
- 1006–1007 – Russian abbot Daniel makes pilgrimage to Palestine.
- 1008 – Caliph al-Hakim bi-Amr Allah forbids Jerusalem Christians from performing the Palm Sunday procession.
- 1009 October 18 – Caliph al-Hakim bi-Amr Allah orders the destruction of the Church of the Holy Sepulchre.
- 1011–1013 February – Uprising of the Yemenite Djarrahid Bedouin tribe who seize Ramla and establish a mini-caliphate.
- 1012 – Beginning of al-Hakim bi-Amr Allah's oppressive decrees against Christians and Jews.
- 1015 September 4 – Earthquake. The dome of the Dome of the Rock collapses.
- 1021 February 13 – Caliph Al-Hakim is assassinated and succeeded by his son al-Zahir.
- 1024 September – Bedouin rebellion erupts over tax-collecting privileges (iqta'a). The Bedouins attack and loot Ramla and Tiberias.
- 1026–1027 – Richard of Verdun makes pilgrimage to Palestine.
- 1027 – A treaty is signed between the Byzantine emperor and the Fatimid caliph. It permits the rebuilding of the Church of the Holy Sepulchre, and allows Christians who had converted to Islam under duress to return to their former faith. It also granted the emperor the right to designate the patriarch of Jerusalem. In return, the mosque of Constantinople would be reopened.
- 1029 – Anushtakin defeats a Bedouin coalition that challenges Fatimid rule in Palestine and Syria.
- 1032 – Renovations of the Dome of the Rock ordered by Caliph al-Zahir are finished.
- 1033:
  - Jerusalem's city walls are rebuilt.
  - December 5 – 1033 Jordan Rift Valley earthquake.
- 1047 – Persian poet and traveler Nasir Khusraw visits Palestine.
- 1063 – The Fatimids strengthen or rebuild the walls of Jerusalem.
- 1064–1065 – The Great German Pilgrimage takes place.
- 1068 – An earthquake destroys Ramla, killing an estimated 15,000.
- 1071 – The Seljuk Turks invade large portions of West Asia, including Asia Minor and the Eastern Mediterranean; they capture Ramla and lay siege to Jerusalem.
- 1073 – The Seljuks invade Palestine.
- 1075:
  - The Seljuks capture Damascus.
  - A severe drought hits Palestine.
- 1077 – The Seljuks capture Jaffa.
- 1089 – The Fatimids conquer Tyre.
- 1092–1095 – Abu Bakr ibn al-Arabi stays in Jerusalem.
- 1093 – Muslims in coastal communities bar Christians from entering Palestine.
- 1095 November 27 – Pope Urban II launches the First Crusade at the Council of Clermont. Its principal objectives are Catholic reconquest of the sacred city of Jerusalem and the Holy Land, and the freeing of Eastern Christians from Islamic rule.
- 1098:
  - July – The Fatimids lay siege to Jerusalem.
  - August 26 – The Fatimids recapture Jerusalem.

== Crusader/Ayyubid period ==
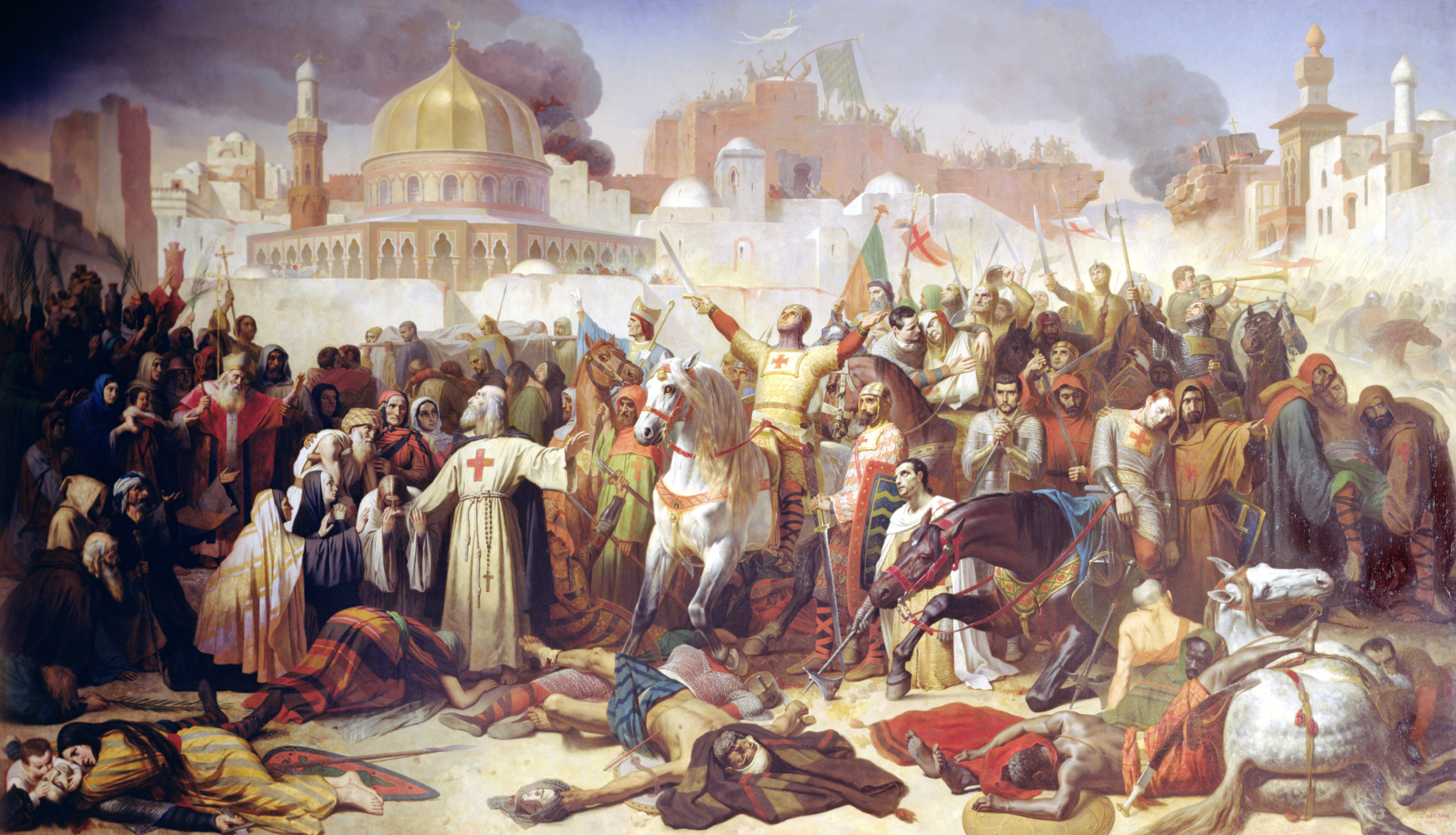
Conquest of Jerusalem in 1099 during the First Crusade (painting from the 19th century)

The Crusader period, sometimes referred to as the medieval period, as it was the only time when the Western-type societal organisation was transplanted to the region, lasted from 1099 when the Crusaders captured Jerusalem, to 1291 when the Kingdom of Jerusalem's last major possession in the Holy Land, Acre, was overrun by the Mamluks. In part of that period, almost every part of the territory changed hands repeatedly between the Crusaders and the Ayyubids.

Alternatively, Adam Zertal defines the medieval period as also including the Mamluk period and the first two decades of the Ottoman period, 1099-1534.

- 1096–1099 – First Crusade and the establishment of the Catholic Kingdom of Jerusalem in Outremer.
- 1099:
  - June 7 – The crusaders reach Jerusalem and besieges the city.
  - June 17 – A Genoese fleet captures Jaffa.
  - July 15 – Catholic soldiers under Godfrey of Bouillon, Robert II of Flanders, Raymond IV of Toulouse and Tancred take Jerusalem after a difficult siege, killing nearly every inhabitant.
  - July 22 – Godfrey is elected as the ruler of Jerusalem, but he is not crowned king.
  - August 12 – The Crusaders defeat the Fatimids at the Battle of Ascalon.
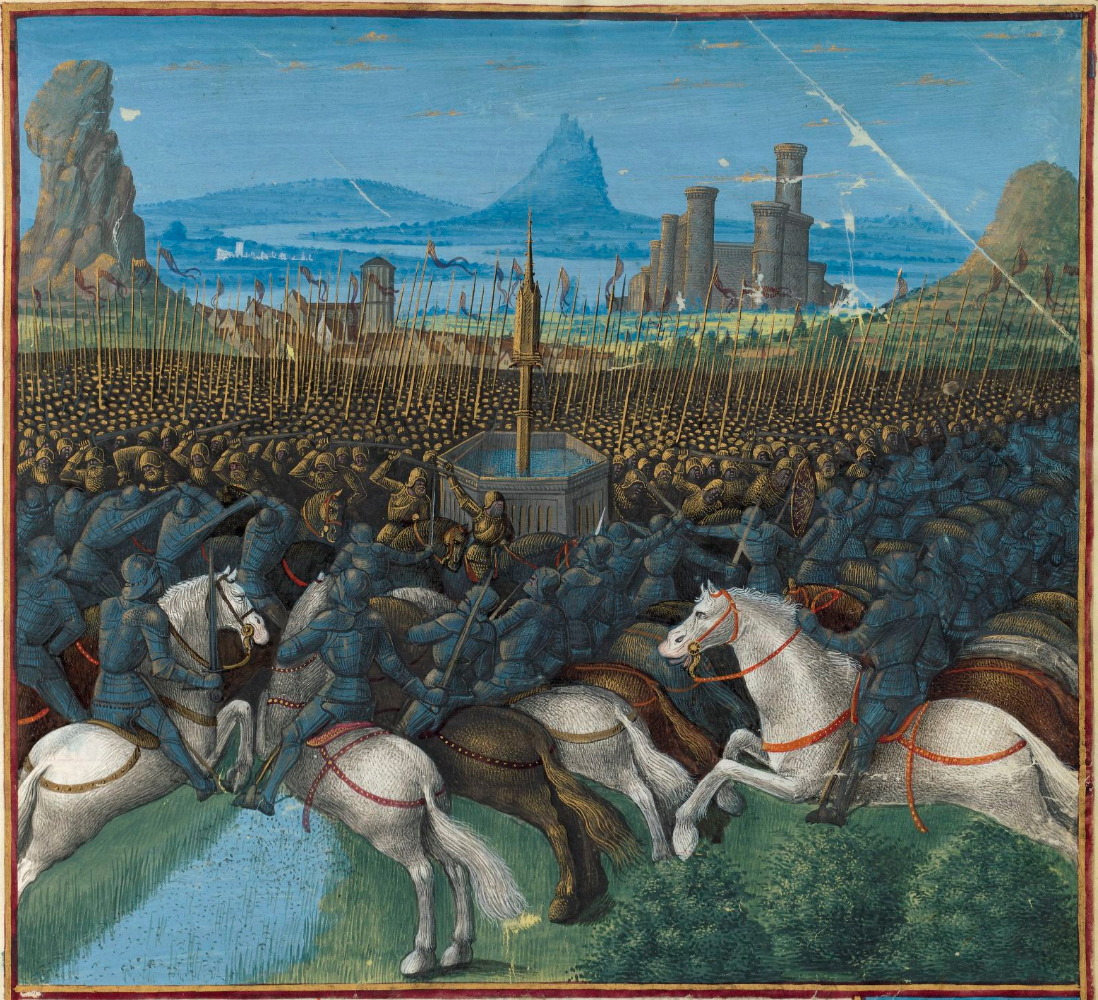
    Battle of Cresson (from a copy of the Passages d'outremer, c.1490)
  - Godfrey of Bouillon enters Jaffa.
- 1100 December 25 – The Kingdom of Jerusalem is established.
- 1113–1115 – Earthquakes hits the region.
- 1116 – The Latins repair the walls of Jerusalem.
- 1153 August 23 – The Franks capture Ascalon, thus completing the conquest of the Western coast of the Mediterranean Sea.
- 1177 November 25 – Battle of Montgisard: Baldwin IV of Jerusalem and Raynald of Chatillon defeat Saladin.
- 1124 – Crusaders conquer Tyre.
- 1177 – The Latins repair the walls of Jerusalem.
- 1187:
  - May 1 – Battle of Cresson: Saladin defeats the crusaders.
  - June – Saladin captures Tiberias.
  - July 4 – Saladin defeats Guy of Lusignan, King of Jerusalem at the Battle of Hattin.
  - October 2 – Saladin captures Jerusalem from Crusaders.
- 1189 August 28 – Guy of Lusignan besieges Acre.
- 1189–1192 – Third Crusade led by the armies of Richard the Lionhearted.
- 1191:
  - June 8 – Richard arrives at Acre.
  - July 12 – The Muslim garrison at Acre surrenders to the Crusaders.
  - August 20 – Richard executes Muslim prisoners from Acre outside the city.
  - September 7 – Richard I of England defeats Saladin at the Battle of Arsuf forcing him to retreat with heavy losses.
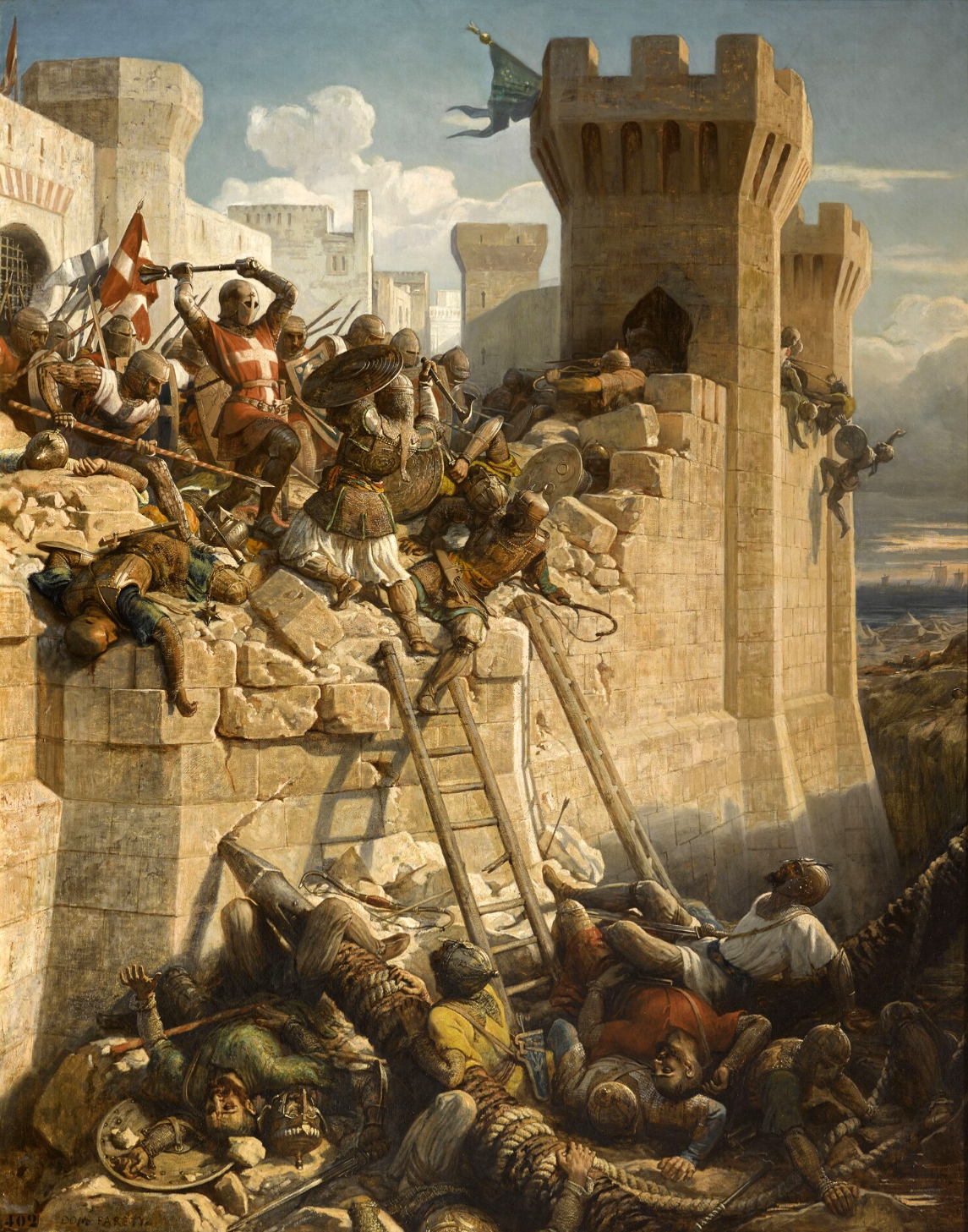
    Siege of Acre (painting by Dominique Papety from 1840)
- 1192:
  - September 2 – Richard and Saladin signs the Treaty of Jaffa, a peace-treaty to run for three years.
  - October 9 – Richard leaves Palestine.
- 1193 March 3/4 – Saladin dies in Damascus. Conflicts between his sons, brothers and nephews cause the disintegration of his empire.
- 1202 – Major earthquake.
- 1219 March – The Ayyubid sultan Al-Mu'azzam Isa orders the destruction of Jerusalem's city walls to prevent the crusaders from capturing a fortified city.
- 1229:
  - February 18 – Frederick II and the Ayyubid sultan Al-Kamil signs the Treaty of Jaffa, a 10-year-truce (hudna) that restores Jerusalem, Nazareth, and Bethlehem to Christian control in exchange for protection.
  - March 17 – Frederick enters Jerusalem.
- 1239 – The Ayyubid ruler An-Nasir Dawud destroys some of the refortifications built by the Franks in Jerusalem.
- 1243 – The Franks recover Jerusalem.
- 1244:
  - July 11 – The Khwarezmians capture Jerusalem and slaughter its inhabitants.
  - October 18 – Battle of La Forbie north-east of Gaza: The Crusaders and their allies, the Ayyubids of Damascus, Homs, and Kerak, suffer a crushing defeat by the Egyptian army and their Khwarezmian mercenaries.
- c. 1250 – Rabbi Yehiel ben Joseph founds a Yeshiva (Jewish religious school) in Acre.
- 1258 – The Mongols execute the last Abbasid caliph.
- 1260 – Battle of Ain Jalut (Jezreel Valley) between the Egyptian Mamluks and the Mongols.
- 1265 – The Mamluk Bahri dynasty of Egypt captures several cities and towns from Crusader states in the Middle East, including the cities of Haifa, Arsuf, and Caesarea Maritima.
- 1267 – According to tradition, Nachmanides visits Jerusalem and establishes the Ramban Synagogue. However, it is doubtful whether Nachmanides ever visited Jerusalem.
- 1291 May 18 – Fall of Acre: Al-Ashraf Khalil of Egypt captures Acre, thus exterminating the Crusader Kingdom of Jerusalem (the final Catholic landholding remaining from the Crusades), and ending the Ninth Crusade.

== Mamluk period ==
The Mamluk period lasted from 1291 when the Mamluks capture Acre, to 1517 when the Ottomans conquered Palestine.

== Ottoman period ==
=== 16th century ===
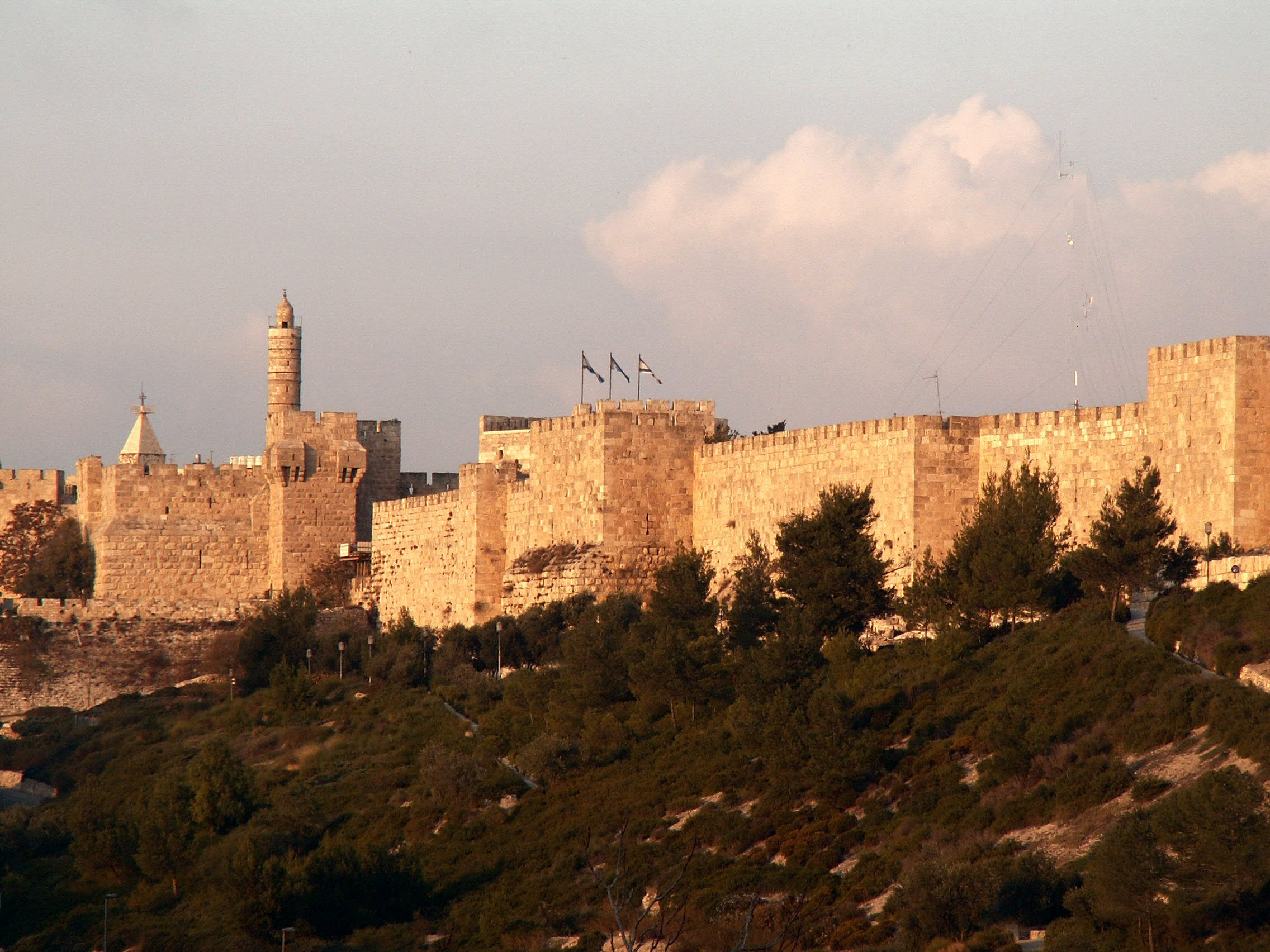
Walls of Jerusalem (photo taken in 2005)

- 1517:
  - The Ottomans conquer Palestine.
  - 1517 – 1517 Hebron pogrom.
- 1538–1535 – Suleiman the Magnificent restores the Dome of the Rock in Jerusalem and the Jerusalem city walls (which are the current walls of the Old City of Jerusalem).
- 1541 – Ottoman Sultan Suleiman I seals off the Golden Gate to prevent the Jewish Messiah's entrance.
- 1546 January 14 – A devastating earthquake shook the Jordan Rift Valley region. The epicenter of the earthquake was in the Jordan River in a location between the Dead Sea and the Sea of Galilee. The cities of Jerusalem, Hebron, Nablus, Gaza, and Damascus were heavily damaged.

=== 17th century ===
- 1660 – The towns of Safed and nearby Tiberias, with substantial Jewish communities, were destroyed in the turmoil following the 1658 death of Mulhim Ma'n, with only Safed being repopulated shortly after the destruction. Some sources place the destruction of Safed in 1662.
- 1604 – First Protectorate of missions under the Capitulations of the Ottoman Empire: Ahmad I agreed that the subjects of Henry IV of France were free to visit the Holy Places of Jerusalem. French missionaries begin to travel to Jerusalem and other major Ottoman cities.
- 1663–1665 – Sabbatai Zevi, founder of the Sabbateans, preaches in Jerusalem before travelling back to his native Smyrna where he proclaimed himself the Messiah.

=== 18th century ===
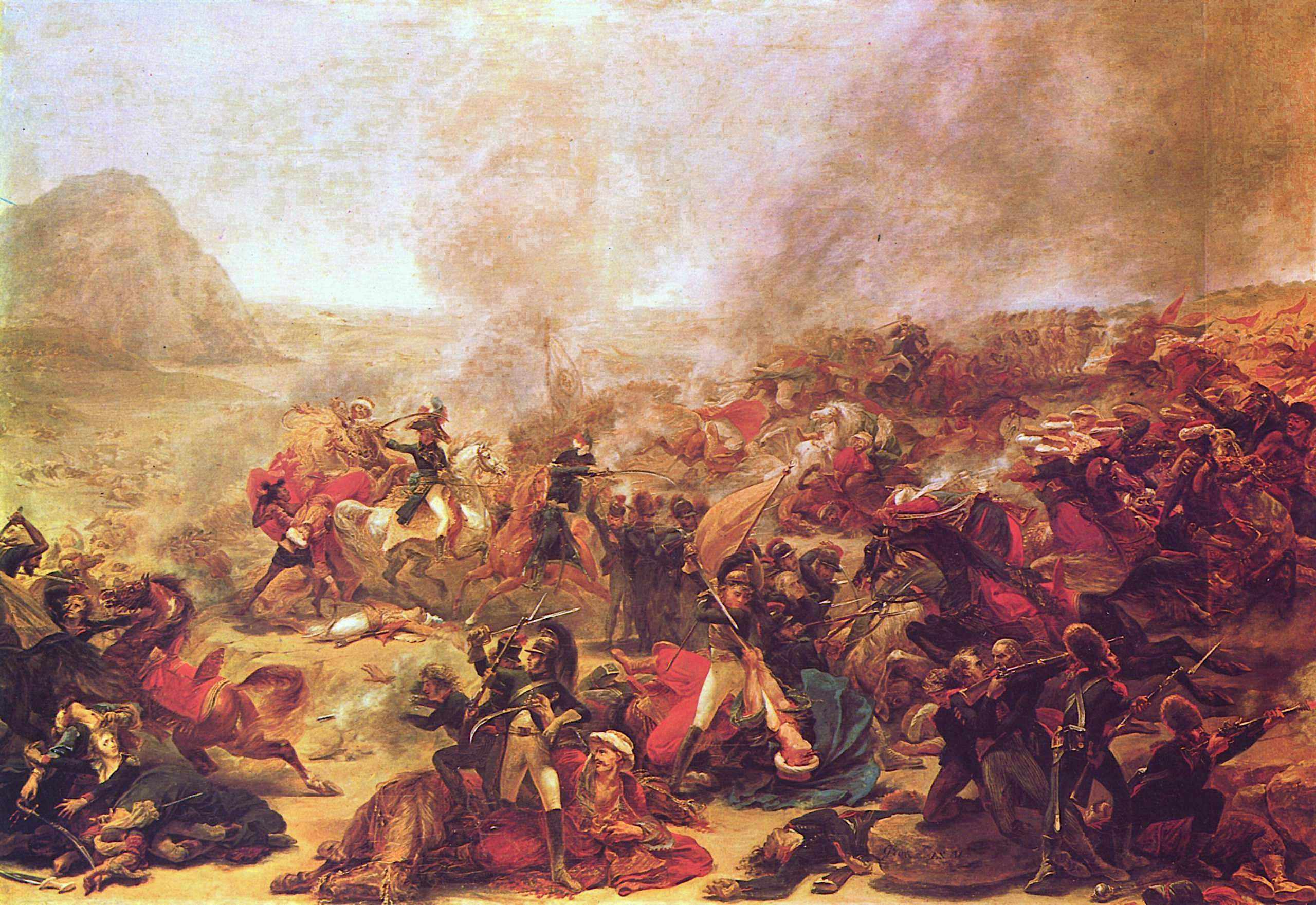
Battle of Nazareth (painting by Antoine-Jean Gros from 1801)

- 1700 – Judah the Pious and 1,000 followers settle in Jerusalem.
- 1742–1777 – Several Jewish Hassidic leaders (including Rabbi Abraham Gershon of Kitob and Menachem Mendel of Vitebsk) move to the Holy Land with many followers of the Baal Shem Tov. Historians mark their arrival as the beginning of the current Jewish Hassidic community in the region.
- 1759 October 30 – Another devastating earthquake shook the Jordan Rift Valley region. The epicenter of the earthquake was again in the Jordan River, in a location between the Sea of Galilee and the Hula Valley. The cities of Safed, Tiberias, Acre, and Sidon were heavily damaged.
- 1798 – Napoleon Bonaparte leads the French Campaign in Egypt and Syria.
- 1799:
  - March 3–4 – Napoleonic Wars: Siege of Jaffa – Napoleon captures the city of Jaffa.
  - March 20–May 21 – Napoleonic Wars: Siege of Acre – An unsuccessful attempt by Napoleon to capture the city of Acre.
  - April 8 – Napoleonic Wars: Battle of Nazareth.
  - April 11 – Napoleonic Wars: Battle of Cana.
  - April 16 – Napoleonic Wars: The Battle of Mount Tabor – Napoleon drives Ottoman Turks across the River Jordan near Acre.

=== 19th century ===
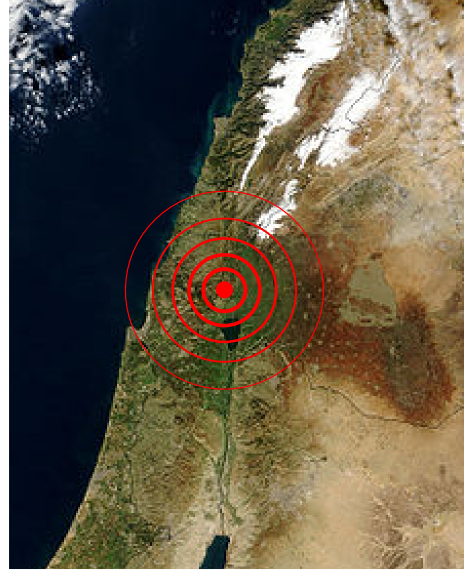
Galilee earthquake of 1837

- 1808–1810 – Students of Elijah ben Solomon Zalman (Gr"a), amounting to 501 families, arrive in the Holy Land. Historians mark their arrival as the beginning of the current Jewish Ashkenazi community in the region.
- 1832 May 10 – Mohammed Ali, leading Egyptian forces, and aided by local Maronites, seizes Acre from the Ottoman Empire after a 7-month siege.
- 1834 – Peasants' revolt in Palestine - revolt by Arab Palestinian peasants against Egyptian conscription and taxation policies.
- 1837 January 1 – Galilee earthquake of 1837 – A devastating earthquake shakes the Galilee region, killing thousands of people.
- 1840 July 15 – The Austrian Empire, the United Kingdom of Great Britain and Ireland, the Kingdom of Prussia, and the Russian Empire sign the Convention of London with the ruler of the Ottoman Empire. The signatories offered to Muhammad Ali and his heirs permanent control over Egypt and the Acre Sanjak (roughly what is now Israel), provided that these territories remain part of the Ottoman Empire and that Ali agreed within ten days to withdraw from the rest of Syria and return to Sultan Abdülmecid I the Ottoman fleet which had defected to Alexandria. Muhammad Ali was also to immediately withdraw his forces from Arabia, the Holy Cities, Crete, the district of Adana, and all of the Ottoman Empire.
- 1860 – The first Jewish neighborhood (Mishkenot Sha'ananim) is built outside the walls of the Old City of Jerusalem.
- 1874 – Jerusalem becomes a Mutesarrifiyyet gaining a special administrative status.
- 1882–1903 – The First Aliyah took place: 25,000–35,000 Jews immigrate to Ottoman Syria.
- 1887–1888 – Ottoman Syria is divided into Jerusalem Sanjak, Nablus Sanjak, and Acre Sanjak
- 1897 August 29–31 – The First Zionist Congress is held in Basel, Switzerland. During it, the World Zionist Organization is founded and the Basel Declaration is approved. The latter determine that the Zionist movement's ultimate aim is to establish and secure under public law a homeland for the Jewish people. The homeland is to be located in the Biblical region dubbed variously "The Holy Land" or "Palestine" by the European Christians during the Catholic and later secular Enlightenment.
- 1898 – German Kaiser Wilhelm visits Jerusalem to dedicate the Lutheran Church of the Redeemer. He meets Theodor Herzl outside city walls.

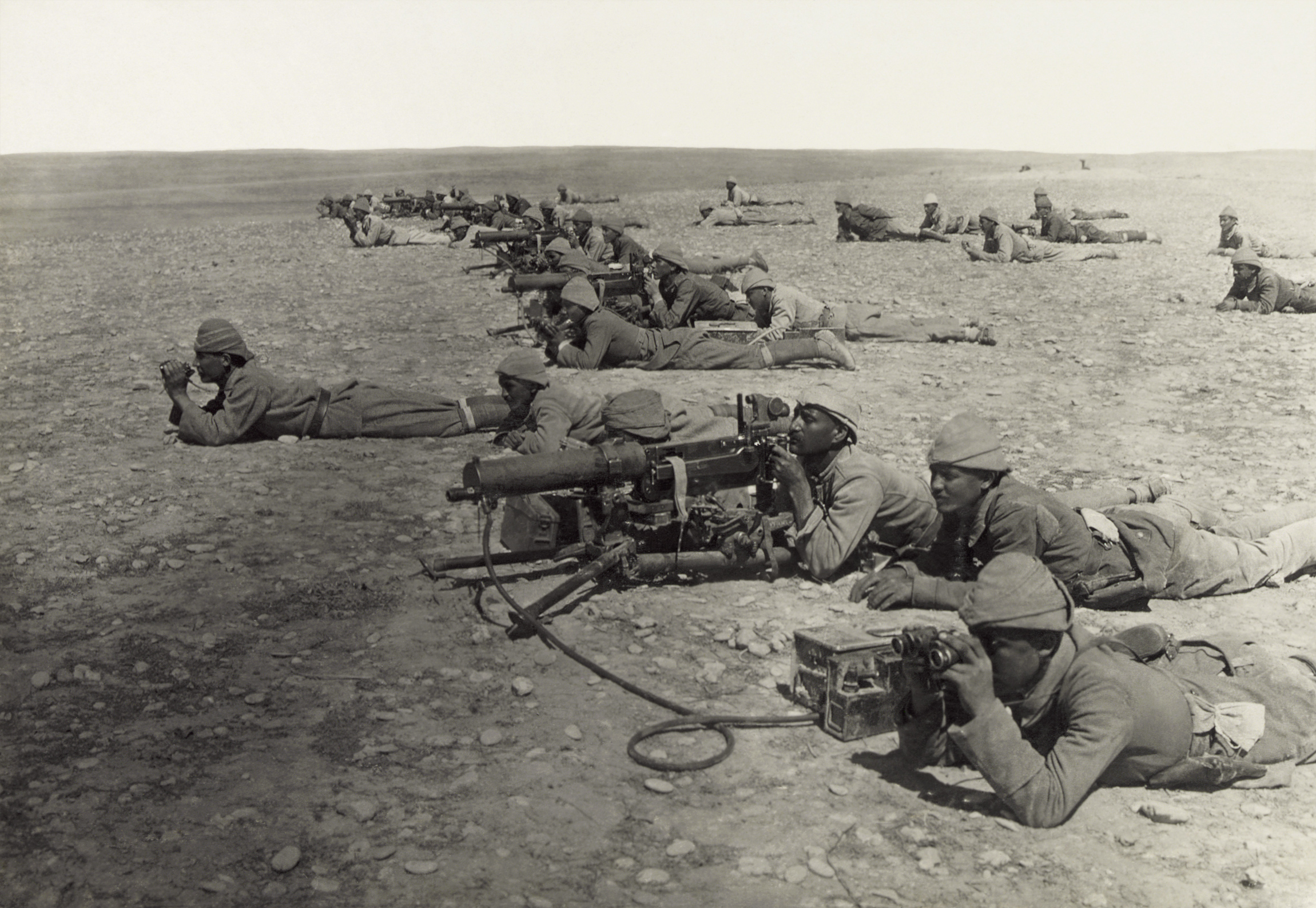
Ottoman machine gunners during the Second Battle of Gaza, 1917

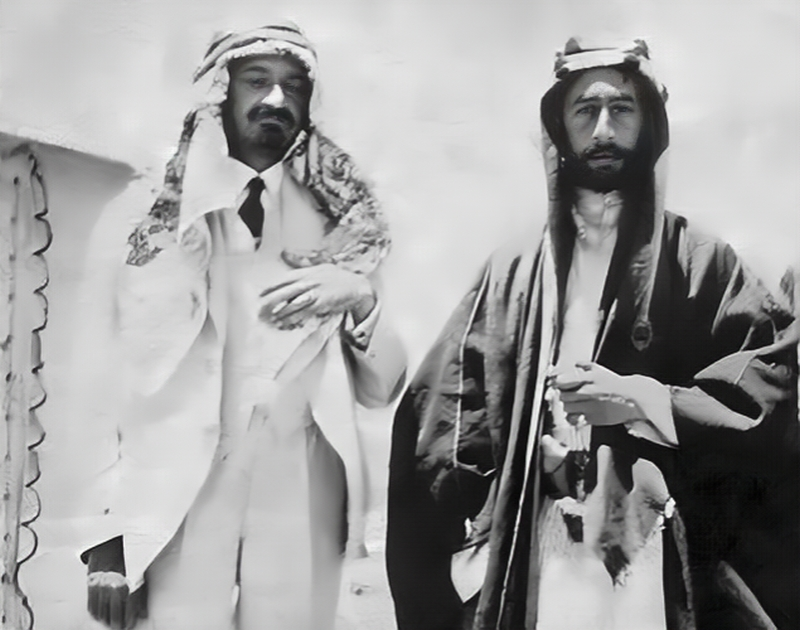
Emir Feisal and Chaim Weizmann during their meeting in 1918

=== 20th century ===
- 1901 – The Jewish National Fund is founded at the Fifth Zionist Congress in Basel with the aim of buying and developing land in the southern region of Ottoman Syria for Jewish settlement.
- 1909 April 11 – Tel Aviv is founded on the outskirts of the ancient port city of Jaffa.
- 1911 – The Arabic newspaper Filasṭīn is founded.
- 1915:
  - January 26–February 4 – A German led Ottoman Army advances from Southern Palestine, and conducts a Raid on the Suez Canal in an attempt to stop traffic through the canal.
  - March–October – The 1915 locust plague breaks out in the Eastern Mediterranean coastal region.
- 1916–1918 – The Arab Revolt
- 1916:
  - 16 May – Britain and France conclude the secret Sykes-Picot Agreement, which defines their respective spheres of influence and control in Western Asia after the expected demise of the Ottoman Empire at the end of World War I. It was largely a trade agreement with a large area set aside for indirect control through an Arab state or a confederation of Arab states.
  - August 3–5 – A German led Ottoman Army attacks British Empire forces defending the Suez Canal at the Battle of Romani.
  - December 23 – The Anzac Mounted Division occupies El Arish and captures the Ottoman garrison during the Battle of Magdhaba.
- 1917:
  - January 9 – Sinai and Palestine Campaign: Battle of Rafa – British Empire forces defeat the Ottoman Empire garrison at Rafah after re-capturing the Egyptian Sinai Peninsula by the Egyptian Expeditionary Force.
  - March 26 – Sinai and Palestine Campaign: First Battle of Gaza – British attack strong Ottoman defences at Gaza, but fail after 17,000 German led Ottoman troops block their advance in the Southern Coastal Plain.
  - April 6 – Sinai and Palestine Campaign: The Tel Aviv and Jaffa deportation – Ottoman authorities deport the entire civilian population of Jaffa and Tel Aviv pursuant to the order from Ahmed Jamal Pasha, the military governor of Ottoman Syria during the First World War. Although Muslim evacuees are allowed to return before long, Jewish evacuees were not able to return until after the British conquest of Palestine.
  - April 19 – Sinai and Palestine Campaign: Second Battle of Gaza – Ottoman defenders repel the second British assault on Gaza.
  - October 31 – Sinai and Palestine Campaign: Battle of Beersheba – XX Corps infantry and Desert Mounted Corps mounted infantry attack Beersheba on the Gaza to Beersheba defensive line on the northern edge of the Negev Desert, capturing it from the Ottoman Empire.
  - October 31–November 7 – Sinai and Palestine Campaign: Third Battle of Gaza – British forces capture Gaza.
  - November 2 – Publication of the Balfour Declaration in which the British Government declares its support for the establishment of a Jewish national home in what is to become Mandate Palestine.
  - November 15 – Sinai and Palestine Campaign: Australian and New Zealand troops capture Jaffa after the Battle of Mughar Ridge fought on November 13.
  - November 17–December 30 – Sinai and Palestine Campaign: Battle of Jerusalem – The Ottoman Empire is defeated by British Empire forces at the Battle of Jerusalem. The British Army's General Allenby enters Jerusalem on foot, in a reference to the entrance of Caliph Umar in 637.
- 1918:
  - February 21 – Sinai and Palestine Campaign: Capture of Jericho – the Egyptian Expeditionary Force's Occupation of the Jordan Valley begins.
  - March 8–12– Sinai and Palestine Campaign: Battle of Tell 'Asur – series of attacks along the Jaffa to Jerusalem line which pushed the front line a few miles north.
  - March 21–April 2 – Sinai and Palestine Campaign: First Transjordan attack on Amman including the First Battle of Amman – an infantry and a mounted division invade Ottoman Empire territory only to be forced by superior Ottoman forces to retreat back to the Jordan Valley.
  - April 30–May 4 – Sinai and Palestine Campaign: Second Transjordan attack on Shunet Nimrin and Es Salt – second attempt to capture Ottoman Empire territory east of the Jordan River when three divisions are again forced back to the Jordan Valley by superior Ottoman defenders.
  - June – First meeting between Zionist leader Chaim Weizmann and the son of the Sharif of Mecca Hashemite Prince Faisal, who led the Arab forces in the Arab Revolt against the Ottoman Empire during the First World War. The meeting takes place in Faisal's headquarters in Aqaba, and attempts to establish favourable relations between Arabs and Jews in the Middle East.
  - July 14 – Sinai and Palestine Campaign: Battle of Abu Tellul
  - September 19–25 – Sinai and Palestine Campaign: Battle of Megiddo including the Battle of Sharon, the Battle of Nablus, and the Third Transjordan attack. The Egyptian Expeditionary Force attacks and captures large numbers of Ottoman and German soldiers and Ottoman territory. These battles included the capture of Amman, Arara, Capture of Afulah and Beisan, Haifa, Jenin, Nablus, Samakh, Tabsor, Tiberias, and Tulkarm, including a series of air raids in the Judean Hills during which bombs are dropped on retreating German and Ottoman columns.
  - September 26–October 1 – Sinai and Palestine Campaign: Capture of Damascus – continuation of the Egyptian Expeditionary Force attacks with capture of almost two Ottoman armies, plus territory extending into Syria. During this advance Irbid, Jisr Benat Yakub, Kaukab, and Kiswe are captured. The British Empire offensive continues into Syria with the Charge at Khan Ayash and the Pursuit to Haritan, as well as the Battle of Aleppo, and ends with the Charge at Haritan on October 26.
  - October 30 – Sinai and Palestine Campaign: The British Sinai and Palestine Campaign officially ends with the signing of the Armistice of Mudros. Shortly thereafter, the Ottoman Empire is dissolved.

== OETA and Mandatory Palestine ==
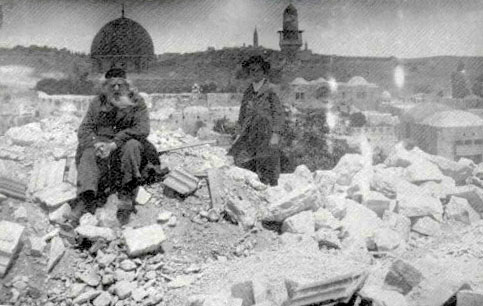
1927 Jericho earthquake: Destruction in the Jewish Quarter of Jerusalem

Occupied Enemy Territory Administration (OETA; 1918-1920) is the name of the British and French control mechanism for Arab-majority areas conquered from the Ottoman Empire during World War I, also used for the corresponding time period.

The Mandate period, British Mandate, or simply the Mandate is the name of the period in which the British Empire ruled over most of the region.

- 1927 July 11 – 1927 Jericho earthquake – A powerful earthquake occurs in the Jordan Rift Valley region.
- 1929 – Outbreak of the 1929 Palestine riots.
- 1936–1939 – The Great Arab Revolt.
- 1947 November 29 – UN General Assembly adopts a resolution containing proposal to divide Mandatory Palestine into independent Arab and Jewish States, with a Special International Regime for the city of Jerusalem and its environs.

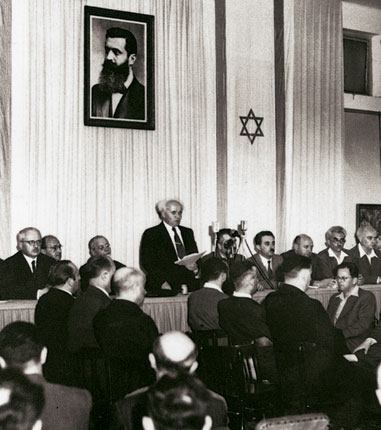
1948: declaration of the establishment of the State of Israel

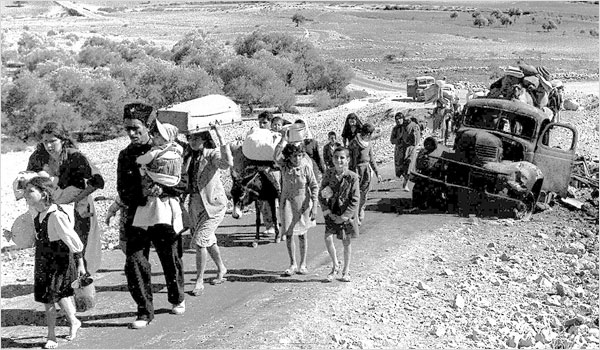
Palestinian Arab refugees in 1948

== Israel, Jordan-occupied West Bank, Egypt-occupied Gaza ==
- 1948 May 14 – Israeli Declaration of Independence: Jewish leadership in the region of Palestine announces the establishment of a Jewish state in Eretz-Israel, to be known as the State of Israel.
- 1948 May 14–1949 January 7 – The 1948 Arab–Israeli War: a large-scale war between Israel and five Arab countries and the Palestinian-Arabs. The war results in an Israeli victory, with Israel annexing territory beyond the borders of the proposed Jewish state and into the borders of the proposed Arab state and West Jerusalem. Jordan, Syria, Lebanon, and Egypt signed the 1949 Armistice Agreements with Israel. The Gaza Strip and the West Bank, were occupied by Egypt and Transjordan, respectively, until 1967. In 1951, the UN Conciliation Commission for Palestine estimated that some 711,000 Palestinian refugees were displaced by the war.
- 1948 October 1 – Palestinian Declaration of Independence (1948): The Palestinian National Council convened in Gaza City and declared an independent Palestinian state in all of the Palestine region with Jerusalem as its capital.
- 1949:
  - February 24 – Israel and Egypt sign an armistice agreement.
  - March 23 – Israel and Lebanon sign an armistice agreement.
  - April 3 – Israel and Jordan sign an armistice agreement.
  - July 20 – Israel and Syria sign an armistice agreement.
- 1950 Spring – Jordan annexes the West Bank.
- 1956 October 29–November 5 – The Sinai Campaign. This war followed Egypt's decision of 26 July 1956 to nationalize the Suez Canal. Initiated by United Kingdom and France, the war was conducted in cooperation with Israel, and aimed at occupying the Sinai Peninsula, with the Europeans regaining control over the Suez Canal. Although the Israeli occupation of the Sinai was successful, the US and USSR forced it to abandon this conquest. Israel, however, managed to re-open the Straits of Tiran and secure its southern border.
- 1967 June 5–10 – The Six-Day War between Israel and all of its neighboring countries: Egypt, Jordan, Syria, and Lebanon which were aided by other Arab countries. The war lasted for six days and concluded with Israel expanding its territory significantly — Gaza Strip and Sinai from Egypt, the West Bank and Jerusalem from Jordan, and the Golan Heights from Syria.

== Israel and the occupied Palestinian territories ==
- 1973 October 6–24 – The Yom Kippur War was fought. The war began with a surprise joint attack on two fronts by the armies of Syria (in the Golan Heights) and Egypt (in the Suez Canal), deliberately initiated during the Jewish holiday of Yom Kippur. The Egyptian Army got back Sinai that was occupied by the Israeli armies for almost 7 years.
- 1974 – The PLO is allowed to represent the Palestinian Arab refugees in the UN as their sole political representative organisation.
- 1978 September 18 – Israel and Egypt sign a comprehensive peace agreement at Camp David which included a condition of Israel's withdrawal from the Rest of Sinai.
- 1979 March 26 – The peace treaty with Egypt was signed by the Israeli Prime Minister Menachem Begin, the Egyptian president Anwar Sadat and U.S. president Jimmy Carter.
- 1982 June–December – The First Lebanon War took place during which Israel invaded southern Lebanon due to the constant terror attacks on northern Israel by the Palestinian guerrilla organizations resident there. The war resulted in the expulsion of the PLO from Lebanon, and created an Israeli Security Zone in southern Lebanon.
- 1984 November 21–1985 January 5 – Operation Moses: IDF forces conduct a secret operation in which approximately 8,000 Ethiopian Jews were brought to Israel from Sudan.
- 1987–1991 – The First Intifada: The first Palestinian uprising took place in the Gaza Strip and the West Bank against the Israeli occupation of the Palestinian territories.
- 1988 November 15 – Palestinian Declaration of Independence (1988) – The Palestinian National Council, the legislative body of the Palestinian Liberation Organization (PLO), in Algiers on 15 November 1988 unilaterally proclaimed the establishment of a new independent state called the "State of Palestine".
- 1991 May 24–25 – Operation Solomon: IDF forces conduct a secret operation in which approximately 14,400 Ethiopian Jews were brought to Israel within 34 hours in 30 IAF and El Al aircraft.

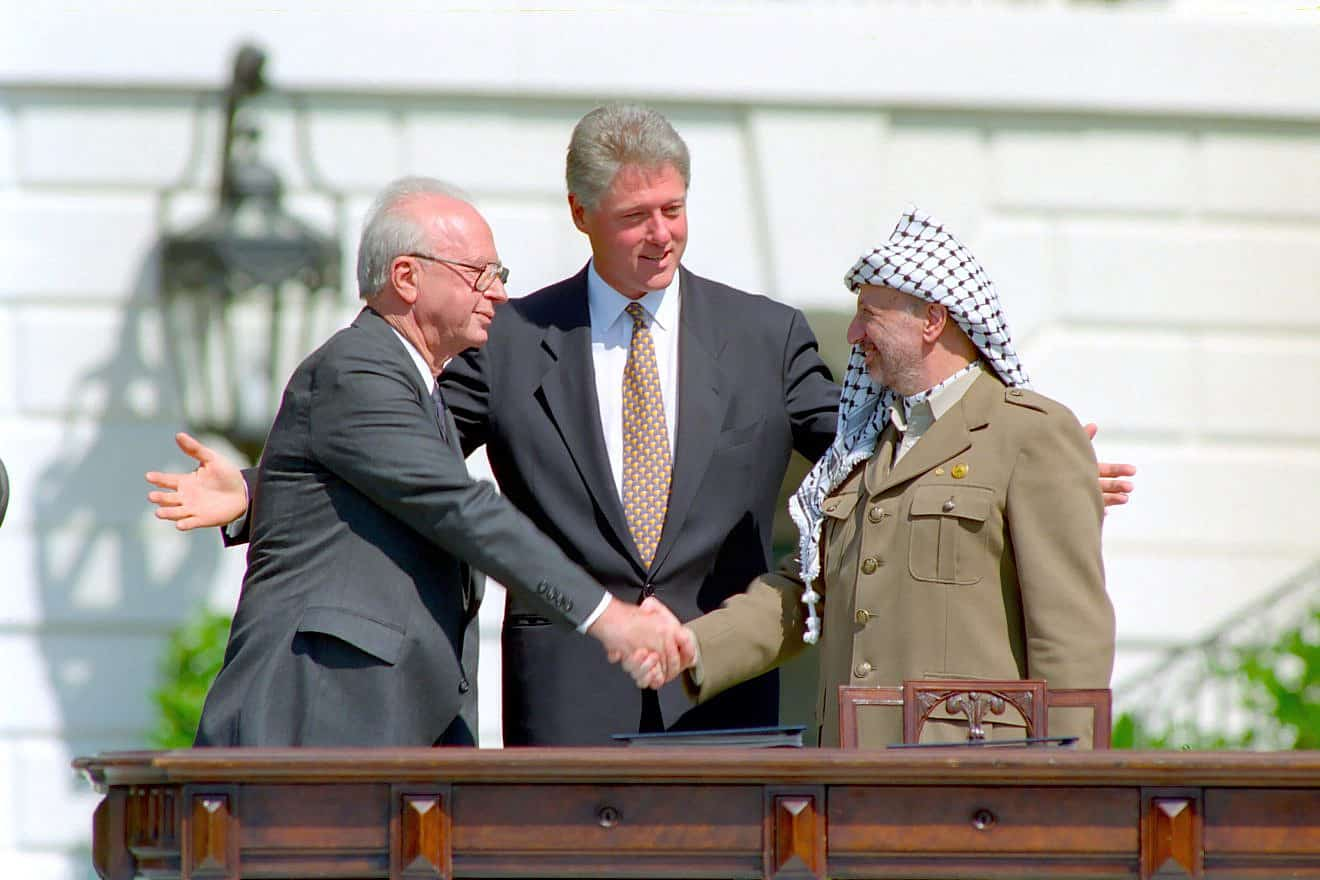
1993: Bill Clinton, Yitzhak Rabin and Yasser Arafat after signing the Oslo Accords

- 1993 September 13 – The first Oslo Accords are signed at an official ceremony in Washington in the presence of Yitzhak Rabin for Israel, Yasser Arafat for PLO and Bill Clinton for the United States.
- 1994 October 26 – The Peace agreement between Israel and Jordan is signed.
- 1995 November 4 – Israeli prime minister Yitzhak Rabin was assassinated by right-wing Israeli radical Yigal Amir.
- 2000–2005 (unclear) – The Second Intifada: The second Palestinian uprising took place in the Gaza Strip and the West Bank against the Israeli occupation of the Palestinian Territories. The uprising which began as massive protests carried out by Palestinians in the Palestinian Territories, soon turned into a violent Palestinian guerrilla campaign which included numerous suicide attacks carried out against Israeli civilians within the state of Israel.

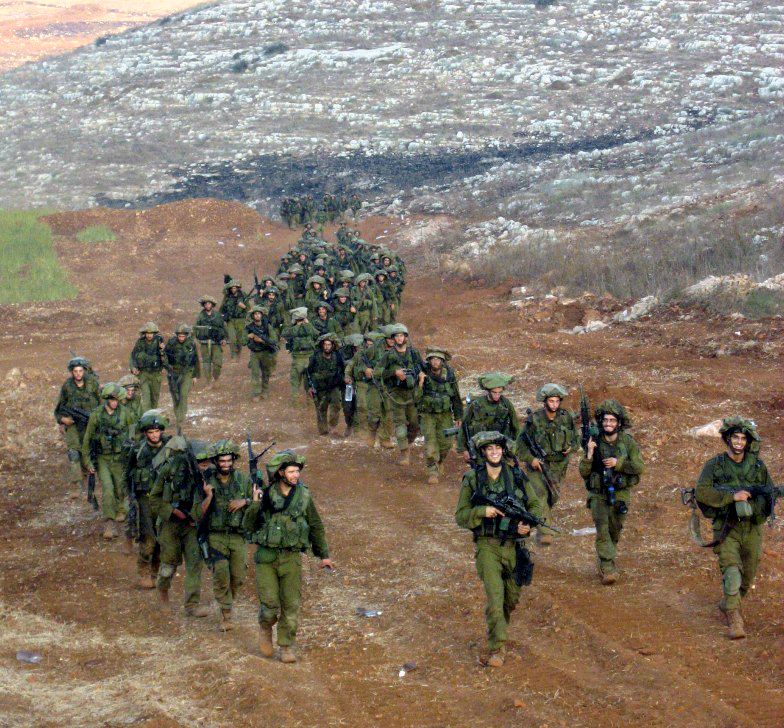
Summer 2006: The Second Lebanon War (photograph taken on August 15, 2006)

- 2002 June – As a result of the significant increase of suicide bombing attacks within Israeli population centers during the first years of the Second Intifada, Israel began the construction of the West Bank Fence along the Green Line border arguing that the barrier is necessary to protect Israeli civilians from Palestinian militants. The significantly reduced number of incidents of suicide bombings from 2002 to 2005 has been partly attributed to the barrier. The barrier's construction, which has been highly controversial, became a major issue of contention between the two sides.
- 2005 August 23 – Israel's unilateral disengagement plan: The evacuation of 25 Jewish settlements in the Gaza Strip and West Bank is completed.
- 2006 July 12–August 14 – The Second Lebanon War took place, which began as a military operation in response to the abduction of two Israeli reserve soldiers by the Hezbollah, and gradually grew to a wider conflict. 1,191 Lebanese were killed, 4,409 were injured.
- 2008 December 27–2009 January 18 – Operation Cast Lead: IDF forces conducted a large-scale military operation in the Gaza Strip during which dozens of targets were attacked in the Gaza Strip in response to ongoing rocket fire on the western Negev. 1,291 Palestinians were killed.
- 2012:
  - November 14–November 21 – Operation Pillar of Cloud: IDF forces launches a large-scale military operation in the Gaza Strip in response to Palestinian militants firing over a hundred rockets from the Gaza Strip into southern Israel beginning on 10 November, with the aims of restoring quiet to southern Israel and to strike at what it considers terror organizations. The operation officially began with the assassination of Ahmed Jabari, chief of the Gaza military wing of Hamas. 158 Palestinians were killed.
  - November 29 – United Nations General Assembly resolution 67/19: Upgrading of Palestine to non-member observer state status in the United Nations.
- 2016 December 23 – United Nations Security Council resolution 2334: Condemning Israeli occupation of Palestinian lands.
- 2017 December 6 – US president Donald Trump announced the United States recognition of Jerusalem as the capital of Israel.
- 2021 May 6–21 – Four Palestinian families face eviction in East Jerusalem and Israeli police storm peaceful worshippers at Al-Aqsa Mosque, leading to a crisis.
- 2023 October 7 – Gaza war: Hamas launched a large-scale offensive against Israel, during which Hamas initially fired thousands of rockets at Israel from the Gaza Strip, while at the same time over a thousand Palestinian militants broke through the border and entered Israel by foot and with motor vehicles, as they engaged in gun battles with the Israeli security forces, conducting massacres and shootings of Israeli civilians, took over Israeli towns and military bases, as well as kidnapped over 200 Israeli soldiers and civilians. As a result Israel's Security Cabinet formally declares war for the first time since the Yom Kippur War in 1973.

== See also ==
- Land of Israel
- Palestine (region)
- List of years in Israel
- List of years in the Palestinian territories
- Time periods in the Palestine region
- Timeline of Haifa
- Timeline of Hebron
- Timeline of Jerusalem
- Timeline of Tel Aviv
- Timeline of Middle Eastern history
- Timeline of the Kingdom of Jerusalem
- Timeline of Israeli history
- Timeline of the Israeli–Palestinian conflict
- British foreign policy in the Middle East
- United States foreign policy in the Middle East
- Timeline of the name Palestine

== Bibliography ==
Multiple/all periods

- Ben-Sasson, H.H. (1976). Abraham Malamat; Hayim Tadmor (eds.). A History of the Jewish People. Harvard University Press. ISBN 978-0-674-39731-6.
- Chareyron, Nicole (March 2, 2005). Pilgrims to Jerusalem in the Middle Ages. Columbia University Press. ISBN 978-0-231-52961-7.
- Hjelm, Ingrid (2010). "Mt. Gerizim and Samaritans in Recent Research". In Waltraud Winkler (ed.). Samaritans: Past and Present: Current Studies. Walter de Gruyter. pp. 25–44. ISBN 978-3-11-019497-5.
- Lewin, Ariel (2005). The Archaeology of Ancient Judea and Palestine. Getty Publications. ISBN 978-0-89236-800-6.
- Magness, Jodi (27 August 2012). The Archaeology of the Holy Land: From the Destruction of Solomon's Temple to the Muslim Conquest. Cambridge University Press. ISBN 978-0-521-12413-3.
- Masalha, Nur (2018). Palestine: A Four Thousand Year History. Bloomsbury Academic. ISBN 978-1-78699-274-1.
- Wagemakers, Bart (February 28, 2014). Archaeology in the 'Land of Tells and Ruins': A History of Excavations in the Holy Land Inspired by the Photographs and Accounts of Leo Boer. Oxbow Books. pp. 219–. ISBN 978-1-78297-245-7.

Bronze Age

- de Miroschedji, Pierre; Sadeq, Moain (2005), "The frontier of Egypt in the Early Bronze Age: preliminary soundings at Tell es-Sakan (Gaza Strip)", in Clarke, Joanne (ed.), Archaeological Perspectives on the Transmission and Transformation of Culture in the Eastern Mediterranean, Council for British Research in the Levant, pp. 155–169, ISBN 978-1-84217-168-4, JSTOR j.ctv310vqks.24
- de Miroschedji, Pierre; Sadeq, Moain (2008). "Sakan, Tell es-". The New Encyclopedia of Archaeological Excavations in the Holy Land. Vol. 5: Supplementary Volume. Israel Exploration Society/Biblical Archaeology Society (BAS). Archived from the original on 23 June 2024 – via BAS Library.
- de Miroschedji, Pierre; Sadeq, Moain; Faltings, Dina; Boulez, Virginie; Naggiar-Moliner, Laurence; Sykes, Naomi; Tengberg, Margareta (2001), "Les fouilles de Tell es-Sakan (Gaza): nouvelles données sur les contacts égypto-cananéens aux IVe-IIIe millénaires", Paléorient (in French), 27 (2): 75–104, doi:10.3406/paleo.2001.4732
- Oren, Eliezer D.; Yekutieli, Yuval (1992). "Taur Ikhbeineh: Earliest Evidence for Egyptian Interconnections". In van den Brink, Edwin C. M. (ed.). The Nile Delta in Transition: 4th–3rd Millennium B.C. Tel Aviv: Israel Exploration Society. pp. 361–384.

Greco-Roman and Byzantine age

- Donaldson, Terence L. (11 May 2000). Religious Rivalries and the Struggle for Success in Caesarea Maritima. Wilfrid Laurier Univ. Press. ISBN 978-1-55458-670-7.
- Grabbe, Lester L. (August 12, 2010). An Introduction to Second Temple Judaism: History and Religion of the Jews in the Time of Nehemiah, the Maccabees, Hillel, and Jesus. A&C Black. ISBN 978-0-567-55248-8.
- Grabbe, Lester L. (2020). A History of the Jews and Judaism in the Second Temple Period: The Maccabean Revolt, Hasmonaean Rule, and Herod the Great (174–4 BCE). Library of Second Temple Studies 95. Vol. 3. T&T Clark. ISBN 978-0-5676-9294-8.
- Grabbe, Lester L. (2021). A History of the Jews and Judaism in the Second Temple Period: The Jews Under the Roman Shadow (4 BCE–150 CE). Library of Second Temple Studies 99. Vol. 4. T&T Clark. ISBN 978-0-5677-0070-4.
- Meyers, Eric M.; Chancey, Mark A. (September 25, 2012). Alexander to Constantine: Archaeology of the Land of the Bible, Volume III. Yale University Press. ISBN 978-0-300-14179-5.
- Schäfer, Peter (2003). The History of the Jews in the Greco-Roman World. Psychology Press. ISBN 978-0-415-30585-3.
- Schwartz, Seth (9 February 2009). Imperialism and Jewish Society: 200 B.C.E. to 640 C.E. Princeton University Press. ISBN 978-1-4008-2485-4.

Hellenistic period

- Bourgel, Jonathan (2019). "The Samaritans during the Hasmonean Period: The Affirmation of a Discrete Identity?". Religions. 10 (11): 628. doi:10.3390/rel10110628. ISSN 2077-1444.
- Gera, Dov (1998). Judaea and Mediterranean Politics: 219 to 161 B.C.E. BRILL. ISBN 90-04-09441-5.
- Lendering, Jona (24 September 2020). "Antiochus IV Epiphanes". Livius.
- Morkholm, Otto (2008). "Antiochus IV". In William David Davies; Louis Finkelstein (eds.). The Cambridge History of Judaism: Volume 2, The Hellenistic Age. Cambridge University Press. pp. 278–291. ISBN 978-0-521-21929-7.
- "Antiochus IV Epiphanes - Biography, Reign, Jerusalem, Revolt, & Death". Encyclopedia Britannica. 5 January 2021.

Roman period

- Bonne, Rick (April 2014). Galilee during the Second Century AD: An Archaeological Examination of a Period of Socio-Cultural Change (Thesis). KU Leuven.
- Chancey, Mark A. (December 15, 2005). Greco-Roman Culture and the Galilee of Jesus. Cambridge University Press. ISBN 978-1-139-44798-0.
- Dignas, Beate; Winter, Engelbert (2007) [2001]. Rome and Persia in Late Antiquity: Neighbours and Rivals. Cambridge University Press. ISBN 978-0-521-84925-8.
- Gabba, Emilio (2008). "The social, economic and political history of Palestine 63 bce – ce 70". In William David Davies; Louis Finkelstein; William Horbury (eds.). The Cambridge History of Judaism: The early Roman period. Cambridge University Press. pp. 94–167. ISBN 978-0-521-24377-3.
- Haensch, Rudolf (August 19, 2010). "The Roman Provincial Administration". In Catherine Hezser (ed.). The Oxford Handbook of Jewish Daily Life in Roman Palestine. OUP Oxford. pp. 1–13. ISBN 978-0-19-921643-7.
- Lendering, Jona (October 10, 2020). "Herod the Great". Livius.
- McLaren, James; Goodman, Martin (August 25, 2016). "The Importance of Perspective: The Jewish-Roman Conflict of 66–70 CE as a Revolution". Revolt and Resistance in the Ancient Classical World and the Near East: In the Crucible of Empire. BRILL. pp. 205–218. ISBN 978-90-04-33018-4.
- Millar, Fergus (1993). The Roman Near East, 31 B.C.-A.D. 337. Harvard University Press. ISBN 978-0-674-77886-3.
- Richardson, Peter (1996). Herod: King of the Jews and Friend of the Romans. Univ of South Carolina Press. ISBN 978-1-57003-136-6.
- Schwartz, Seth (August 25, 2016). "The Impact of the Jewish Rebellions, 66–135 CE: Destruction or Provincialization?". Revolt and Resistance in the Ancient Classical World and the Near East: In the Crucible of Empire. BRILL. pp. 234–252. ISBN 978-90-04-33018-4.
- Viviano, Benedict (2007). Matthew and His World: The Gospel of the Open Jewish Christians: Studies in Biblical Theology. Vandenhoeck & Ruprecht. ISBN 978-3-7278-1584-3.
- Weksler-Bdolah, Shlomit (December 16, 2019). Aelia Capitolina – Jerusalem in the Roman Period: In Light of Archaeological Research. BRILL. ISBN 978-90-04-41707-6.

Byzantine period

- Slavik, Diane (2001). Daily Life in Ancient and Modern Jerusalem. Lerner Publications. ISBN 978-0-8225-3218-7.
- Stewart Evans, James Allan (2005). The Emperor Justinian and the Byzantine Empire. Greenwood Publishing Group. pp. 26–. ISBN 978-0-313-32582-3.
- Bijovsky, Gabriela (2007). "Numismatic Evidence for the Gallus Revolt: The Hoard from Lod". Israel Exploration Journal. 57 (2): 187–203. JSTOR 27927173.
- Moser, Muriel (December 6, 2018). Emperor and Senators in the Reign of Constantius II. Cambridge University Press. ISBN 978-1-108-48101-4.
- Lewis, Bernard (April 15, 2011). Islam in History: Ideas, People, and Events in the Middle East. Open Court. ISBN 978-0-8126-9757-5.
- Sivan, Hagith (February 14, 2008). Palestine in Late Antiquity. OUP Oxford. ISBN 978-0-19-160867-4.

Byzantine-Islamic transition

- Avni, Gideon (2014). The Byzantine-Islamic Transition in Palestine: An Archaeological Approach. OUP Oxford. pp. 325–. ISBN 978-0-19-968433-5.

Early Muslim period

- Goitein, S.D.; Grabar, O. (2007). "Jerusalem". In Clifford Edmund Bosworth (ed.). Historic Cities of the Islamic World. BRILL. pp. 224–255. ISBN 978-90-04-15388-2.
- Pringle, Denys (1993). The Churches of the Crusader Kingdom of Jerusalem: Volume 3, The City of Jerusalem: A Corpus. Cambridge University Press. ISBN 978-0-521-39038-5.
- Gil, Moshe (1997) [1983]. A History of Palestine, 634–1099. Translated by Ethel Broido. Cambridge: Cambridge University Press. ISBN 0-521-59984-9.
- Harris, Jonathan (2014). Byzantium and the Crusades. Bloomsbury Publishing. ISBN 978-1-78093-671-0.
- Preiser-Kapeller, Johannes (2021). "The Medieval Roman Empire of the East as a Spatial Phenomenon". In Yuri Pines; Michal Biran; Jörg Rüpke (eds.). The Limits of Universal Rule: Eurasian Empires Compared. Cambridge University Press. ISBN 978-1-108-48863-1.
- Kennedy, Hugh (2004) [1986]. The Prophet and the Age of the Caliphates: The Islamic Near East from the 6th to the 11th Century (Second ed.). Harlow: Longman. ISBN 978-0-582-40525-7.
- Jotischky, Andrew (2016). Benjamin Z. Kedar; Jonathan Phillips; Jonathan Riley-Smith (eds.). Crusades: Volume 7. Taylor & Francis. ISBN 978-1-351-98557-4.
- Kaegi, Walter E. (1992). Byzantium and the early Islamic conquests. Cambridge, UK: Cambridge University Press. ISBN 0-521-41172-6.
- Lev, Yaacov (2006). "Palestine". In Josef W. Meri (ed.). Medieval Islamic Civilization: L-Z, index. Taylor & Francis. pp. 590–2. ISBN 978-0-415-96692-4.
- Meri, Josef W. (2006). Medieval Islamic Civilization: L-Z, index. Taylor & Francis. ISBN 978-0-415-96692-4.
- Olszowy-Schlanger, Judith (1998). Karaite Marriage Documents from the Cairo Geniza: Legal Tradition and Community Life in Mediaeval Egypt and Palestine. BRILL. pp. 55–. ISBN 90-04-10886-6.
- Burke, Aaron A; Peilstocker, Martin (2011). The History and Archaeology of Jaffa 1. Cotsen Institute of Archaeology Press. ISBN 978-1-938770-56-2.
- Khadduri, Majid (2006). War and Peace in the Law of Islam. The Lawbook Exchange, Ltd. ISBN 978-1-58477-695-6.
- Janin, Hunt (2015). Four Paths to Jerusalem: Jewish, Christian, Muslim, and Secular Pilgrimages, 1000 BCE to 2001 CE. McFarland. ISBN 978-1-4766-0880-8.

Crusader period

- Tyerman, Christopher (2006). God's War: A New History of the Crusades. The Belknap Press of Harvard University Press. ISBN 978-0-674-02387-1.
- Maalouf, Amin (1984). The Crusades Through Arab Eyes. SAQI. ISBN 978-0-86356-023-1.
- Asbridge, Thomas (2004). The First Crusade: A New History. Simon&Schuster. ISBN 978-0-7432-2084-2.
- Lock, Peter (2006). The Routledge Companion to the Crusades. Routledge. ISBN 9-78-0-415-39312-6.
- Barber, Malcolm (2012). The Crusader States. Yale University Press. ISBN 978-0-300-11312-9.
- Baldwin, Marshall W. (1969). "The Latin States under Baldwin III and Amalric I, 1143–1174; The Decline and Fall of Jerusalem, 1174–1189". In Setton, Kenneth M.; Baldwin, Marshall W. (eds.). A History of the Crusades, Volume One: The First Hundred Years. The University of Wisconsin Press. pp. 528–561, 590–621. ISBN 1-58684-251-X.
- Jotischky, Andrew (2017). Crusading and the Crusader States. Routledge. ISBN 978-1-138-80806-5.
- Hickman, Kennedy (October 15, 2019). "The Crusades: Battle of Ascalon". ThoughtCo.
- "Palestine - The Crusades". Encyclopedia Britannica.
- "Crusades". Encyclopedia Britannica. December 29, 2020.
- Asbridge, Thomas (2010). The Crusades: The Authoritative History of the War for the Holy Land. HarperCollins e-books. ISBN 978-0-06-198136-4.
- Roth, Norman (2014). Medieval Jewish Civilization: An Encyclopedia. Routledge. ISBN 978-1-136-77155-2.
- Boas, Adrian J. (2001). Jerusalem in the Time of the Crusades: Society, Landscape and Art in the Holy City Under Frankish Rule. Routledge. ISBN 978-1-134-58272-3.
- Madden, Thomas F. (2014). The Concise History of the Crusades. Rowman & Littlefield Publishers. ISBN 978-1-4422-3116-0.

Ottoman period

- Farsoun, Samih K. (2004). Culture and Customs of the Palestinians. Greenwood Publishing Group. ISBN 978-0-313-32051-4.
