= John V of Jerusalem =

Greek Orthodox Patriarch of Jerusalem (706–735)

John V was Greek Orthodox Patriarch of Jerusalem (706–735).

John V of Jerusalem was the patriarch of Jerusalem during the iconoclastic struggles under the Byzantine emperor Leo III the Isaurian as well as the time of persecution in Palestine and Syria under Muslim rulers.

John, who was a monk, succeeded Patriarch Anastasius II as patriarch of Jerusalem in 706. He was a friend of John of Damascus and ordained him to the priesthood shortly after John of Damascus entered the monastery to become a monk. Patriarch John also supported John in his efforts against emperor Leo and the iconoclasts, including writing a number of tracts against iconoclasm.

During his patriarchate, John had to contend with the Umayyad caliph Omar II. On coming into power in 717, Omar did not cause any persecutions against the Christians.

Read Umar’s Assurance (Wikipedia) which gives full protection to Christians and their places of worship and property. This is noted by Greek Orthodox Patriarchate.

John V reposed in 735 and was succeeded by a John VI, although some scholars believe the John V and John VI were the same person.

Religious titles
Preceded by Anastasius II	Patriarch of Jerusalem; 706–735	Succeeded by Theodore
