= Theodore of Jerusalem =

Patriarch of Jerusalem

Theodorus of Jerusalem, also Theodore was the Greek Orthodox Patriarch of Jerusalem. The dates of his patriarchate vary, from 745-770 to 760-782.

Theodorus saw, during his episcopate, a severe persecution of the Christians and Jews in Palestine by the Muslim ruler Abdallah ibn Ali, who demanded extremely high taxes from Christians and placed harsh restrictions on them: forbidding nocturnal vigils, confiscating sacred vessels, and demanding removal of crosses from all the churches. Abdallah required Christians and Jews to bear distinctive markings. As the leaders of the Christians, the bishops bore the brunt of his harsh actions. These persecutions also forced many Christians to leave Palestine, further changing its social character.

Also, during his episcopate, Theodorus joined with the patriarchs of Alexandria and Antioch in the condemnation of Cosmas, the Bishop of Epiphanius (Hama), who had declared himself to be an iconoclast.

Theodorus died in 782 and was succeeded by Eusebius as patriarch. However, Eusebius himself reposed before the year was over.

Religious titles
| Preceded by John V | Patriarch of Jerusalem; 745-770 or 760-82 | Succeeded by Elias II |
