= Erhard Reuwich =

15th-century Dutch artist and printer

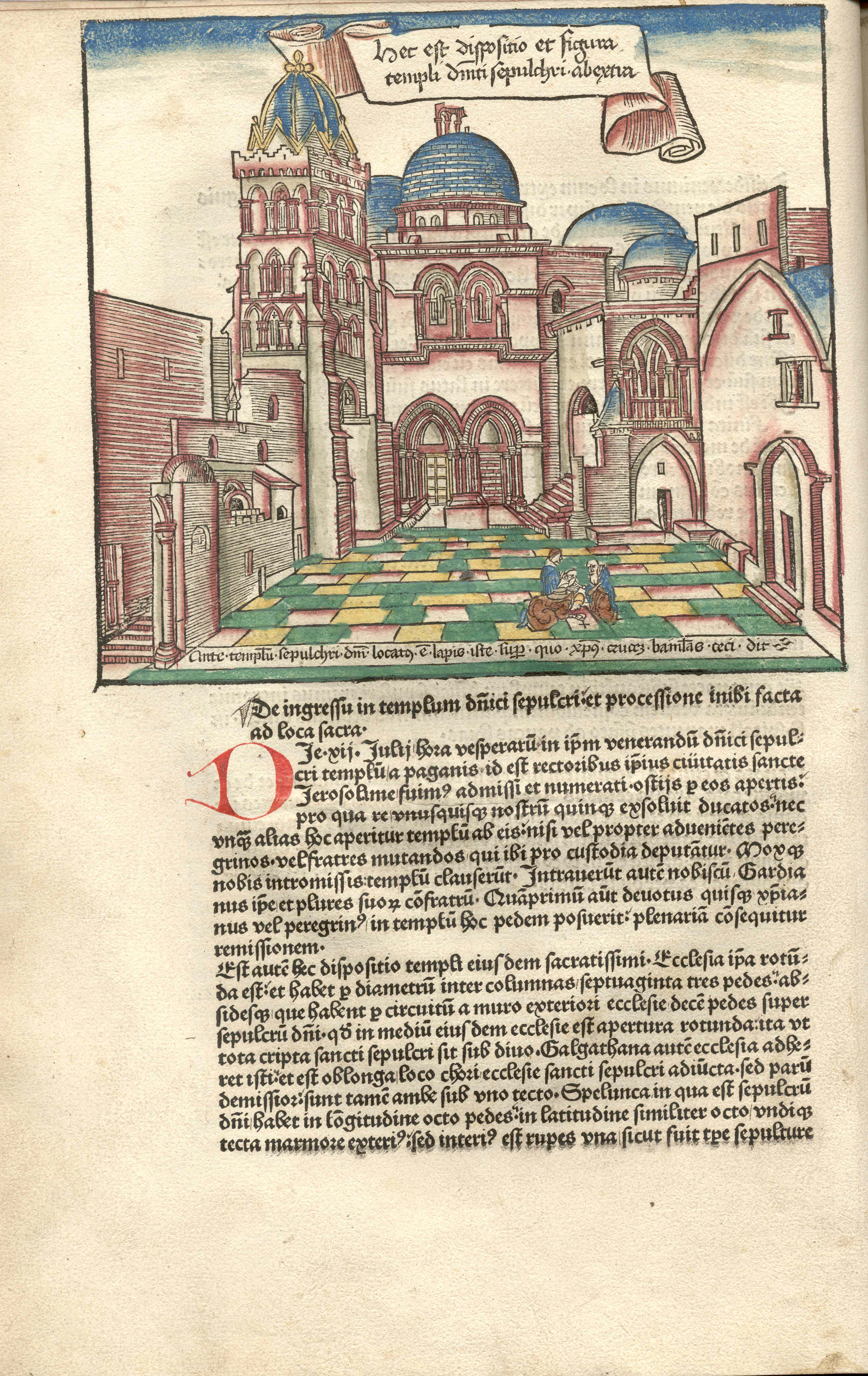
Hand-coloured woodcut by Erhard Reuwich of the entrance to the Church of the Holy Sepulcher, Jerusalem

Erhard Reuwich (Dutch: Reeuwijk) was a Dutch artist, as a designer of woodcuts, and a printer, who came from Utrecht but then worked in Mainz. His dates and places of birth and death are unknown, but he was active in the 1480s.

He came from a family of painters in Utrecht, and his father may have been Hildebrand Reuwich, who was Dean of the painters' guild there in 1470. He traveled on a pilgrimage to Jerusalem, which gave rise to his most famous work. It has been suggested that he was the Master of the Housebook, but this has not been generally accepted. Perhaps more likely is his identification as an engraver known as the Master of the Book of Reason.

== Peregrinatio in Terram Sanctam ==
The Peregrinatio in Terram Sanctam or Sanctae Peregrinationes, an incunabulum account of a pilgrimage to Jerusalem, by Bernhard von Breydenbach, was published in 1486, with the illustrations drawn by Reuwich. Breydenbach was a wealthy canon of Mainz Cathedral who made the pilgrimage in 1483–1484, taking with him, as the book explains, Erhard Reuwich of Utrecht, a "skillful artist", to make drawings of the sights. Breydenbach was made Dean of the Cathedral soon after his return. The party also included two friends, one a knight, and a cook.

Leaving in April 1483 and arriving back in January 1484, they travelled first to Venice, where they stayed for three weeks. They then took ship for Corfu, Modon and Rhodes – all still Venetian possessions. After Jerusalem and Bethlehem and other sights of the Holy Land, they went to Mount Sinai and Cairo. After taking a boat down the Nile to Rosetta, they took ship back to Venice.

It is most unusual for an illustrator to be named at this time - no doubt the fact that Reuwich was also the printer helped. The book also says that he printed the first edition (in Latin) at his house in Mainz; he may have inserted this information himself.

That is all the biographical detail that is known of Reuwich; no other documentation for him has been discovered. No other books say that he printed or illustrated them, but it is believed that Reuwich also designed the woodcuts for some illustrations of plants for a herbal published in Mainz in 1485. In December 1486 a "Meister Erhard von Mainz" is recorded as installing stained-glass panels in the "Amtskellerei" in Amorbach in Bavaria; this could be him.

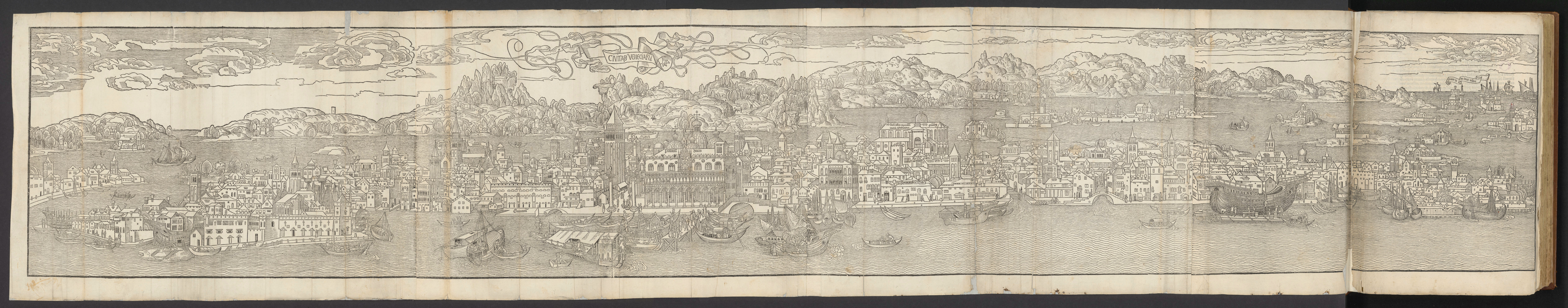
Veduta of Venice by Erhard Reuwich for the Peregrinationes in terram sanctam, Mainz 1486

== Innovations ==
The Sanctae Peregrinationes, or the Peregrinatio in Terram Sanctam, was the first printed illustrated travel-book, and marked a leap forward for book illustration generally. It featured five large fold-out woodcuts, the first ever seen in the West, including a spectacular five-foot-long (30 × 160 cm) woodcut panoramic view of Venice, where the pilgrims had stayed for three weeks. The book also contained a three-block map of Palestine and Egypt, centred on a large view of Jerusalem, which is the oldest known printed map of Jerusalem.

Jerusalem, Palestine and Egypt in Peregrinatio in Terram Sanctam, the oldest known printed map of Jerusalem

The book also contained panoramas of five other cities: Iraklion, Modon, Rhodes, Corfu and Parenzo, which were visited on the way to the Holy Land. There were also studies of Near Eastern costume, and an Arabic alphabet - also the first in print. Pictures of animals purported to have been seen on the journey, including a crocodile, camel, and unicorn, were also included.

The colophon of the book is a lively coat-of-arms of the current Archbishop of Mainz, which includes the first cross-hatching in woodcut.

== Bestseller ==
The book was a bestseller, reprinted thirteen times over the next three decades, including printings in France and Spain, for which the illustration blocks were shipped out to the local printers. The first edition in German was published within a year of the Latin one, and it was also translated into French, Dutch and Spanish before 1500. Additional text-only editions and various abridged editions were also published.

The illustrations were later adapted by Michael Wolgemut for the Nuremberg Chronicle of 1493, and much copied by various other publishers.

== The Master of the Housebook? ==
It was first suggested in 1936 that Reuwich should be identified as the Master of the Housebook, a painter and engraver in drypoint, the first artist to use this technique. His identification with the Housebook Master has not been generally accepted, though A. Hyatt Mayor supported it; other suggestions have been made for the identity of the Housebook Master.
