= King Baldwin =

King Baldwin may refer to:

- Baldwin I of Jerusalem (r. 1100–1118)
- Baldwin II of Jerusalem (r. 1118–1131)
- Baldwin III of Jerusalem (r. 1143–1163)
- Baldwin IV of Jerusalem (r. 1174–1185), also known as the Leper King
- Baldwin V of Jerusalem (r. 1183–1186)
