= Brotherhood of the Holy Sepulchre =

Eastern Orthodox monastic fraternity

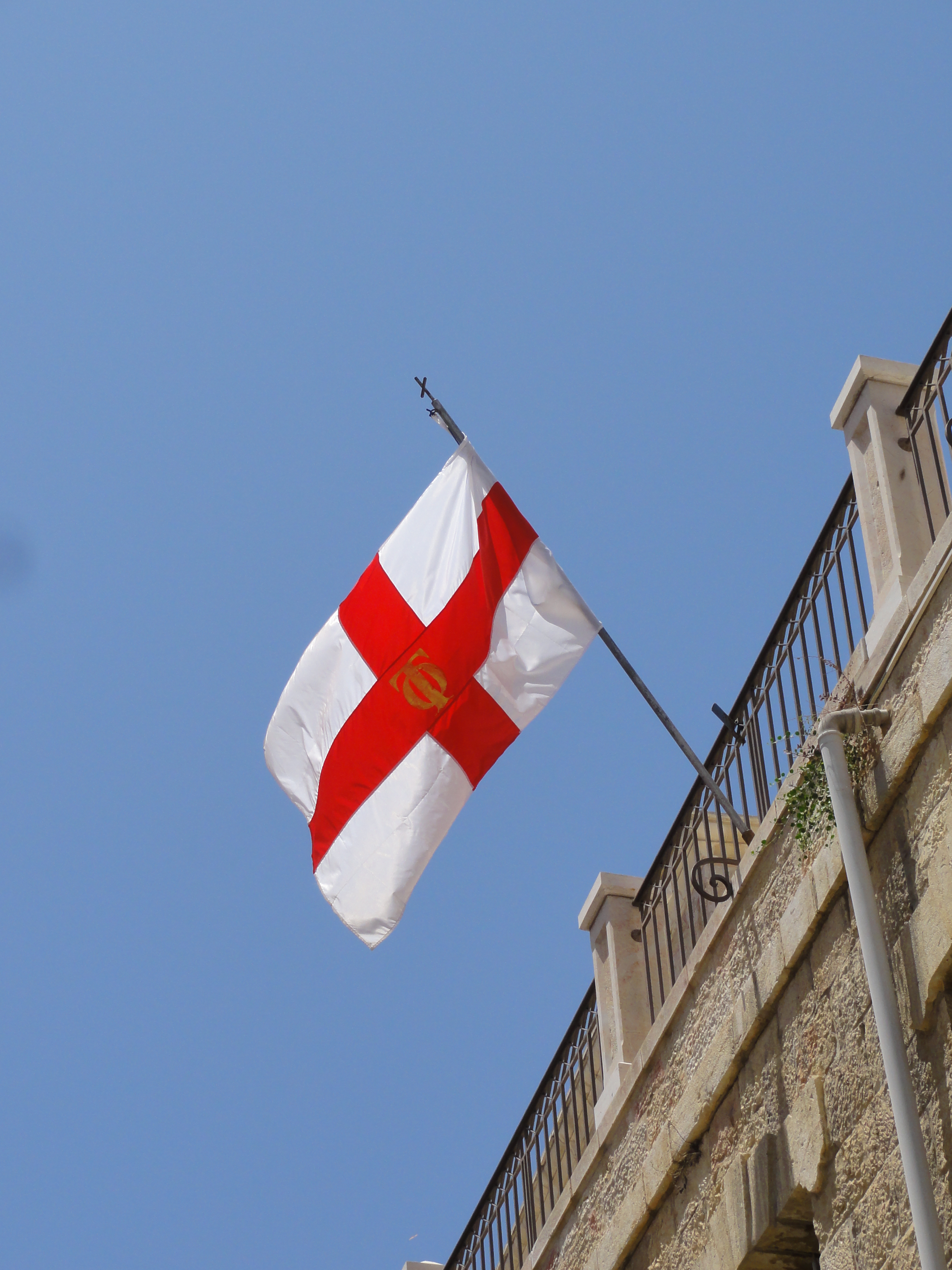
Flag of the Patriarchate with the letters "ΤΦ" (Tau + Phi) representing the words "phylakes taphou" ('Protectors of the Tomb')

The Brotherhood of the Holy Sepulchre, (Note: Greek: Ιερά Αγιοταφιτική Αδελφότητα, Ierá Agiotafitikí Adelfótita; Palestinian Arabic: اخوان القبر المقدس) or the Holy Community of the All-Holy Sepulchre, is an Eastern Orthodox monastic fraternity guarding the Church of the Holy Sepulchre and other Christian holy places in the Holy Land. It was founded in its present form during the British Mandate in Palestine (1920–1948). Headed by the Greek Orthodox Patriarch of Jerusalem, the brotherhood also administers the Greek Orthodox Church of Jerusalem, such as metropolitans, archbishops, bishops, archimandrites, hieromonks, hierodeacons, and monks.

The brotherhood's symbol is the taphos, a monogram of the Greek letters tau (Τ) and phi (Φ), for the word taphos (τάφος, meaning "sepulchre, grave"). It can be seen on most Greek Orthodox buildings in Jerusalem.

The brotherhood is seated in the Central Monastery of Saints Constantine and Helen, Jerusalem, (Note: Greek: Κεντρικόν Μοναστήριον Ἁγίων Κωνσταντίνου καί Ἑλένης and Arabic: الدير المركزي (المعروف بدير القديسَين قسطنطين وهيلانة)) northeast of Megali Panagia Nunnery.

== Name ==
The Holy Sepulchre refers to the burial chamber, or sepulchre, of Jesus, which is believed to be inside the eponymous Church.

The organization is also known in English as the Hagiotaphite Brotherhood, and its members referred to as Hagiotaphites or Agiotaphites, from the Greek hagios ("holy") and taphos ("sepulchre").

== History ==
=== Holy Sepulchre before the Brotherhood ===
The Brotherhood asserts that its foundation traces back to monastic guardians of the Holy sites existing prior to the fourth century.

Under Umar, a Document of Guardianship was given to the Church of Jerusalem to have ownership over the Church of the Holy Sepulchre. When the Crusaders occupied Jerusalem in 1099, they appropriated the Holy Sepulchre and other Holy places until Saladin threw them out of Egypt and reconfirmed he Document of Guardianship of Umar as placing the Holy Sepulchre under the "Indigenous Orthodox Arab people" rather than the Catholics. In 1250 Sultan Baybars again confirmed the right of the indigenous Orthodox over the Holy Sepulchre. When Mehmed II conquered Constantinople, Patriarch Athanasius IV of Jerusalem came to him and reconfirmed the document, and this happened again under Salim I and Patriarch Atallah.

A local Orthodox tradition states that when Caliph Umar wanted to write the Document of Guardianship, he saw that Christians were divided into many groups, so asked Patriarch Sophronius what he should call the Christians of Jerusalem. After praying fervently for an answer, he heard the fifth Psalm, "Oh my King and my Lord", and decided upon the name Melkite, meaning "Royal People". Members of the Brotherhood would later claim that this tradition was meant specifically to refer to the Greek nation, because they claim Patriarch Sophronius was Greek—thus being invoked as a justification for discrimination against non-Greeks.

=== Establishment of the Brotherhood as a Greek nationalist project ===
Monastic groups existed in Jerusalem prior to the Brotherhood which always had all indigenous clergy, but in 1537 Germanus "the Peloponnesian" became Patriarch of Jerusalem and founded the Brotherhood of the Holy Sepulchre.

Germanus was a fervent Greek nationalist who began replacing Arab bishops on their death with Greek bishops, eventually passing a law that a non-Greek cannot be elevated to the bishopric. Also seeking to have a Greek successor, he brought a priest from Constantinople and performed a suspicious and potentially rigged election ceremony which ended in this same priest, Sophronius IV, as his successor. The Brotherhood of the Holy Sepulchre from its beginning with Germanus was meant as an ethno-nationalist project to slowly remove indigenous control of Jerusalem and its Holy Places and consolidate it under the Greeks. Immediately after being elected, Germanus traveled to Constantinople and other places to gather finances. Except for Sophronius, every Patriarch from Germanus to Cyril would never once see their flock as a Bishop is meant to, but would live in Constantinople or a Metochion in affluent areas of Jerusalem apart from the indigenous people, leaving administration to a bishop called the "Patriarchal Commissioner", allowing the Greek monks and clergy to live in luxury as a higher class than the indigenous. Many of the Greek Patriarchs of the Brotherhood would only ordain their relatives.

After twenty nine years, Patriarch Sophronius relinquished his position, in part due to enormous debts accumulated from disputing with Roman Catholics over control of the Sepulchre and other holy sites, with Patriarch Theophanes succeeding him.

The Brotherhood from its founding began to immediately redirect proceeds from the Holy Places, and using Greek princes in Moldavia and Serbia were able to change the ownership of many monasteries together with their properties, as well as those of affluent Orthodox, to come under the Brotherhood, as well as seeking properties in Georgia and the Caucasus. Many Metochia were built in Jerusalem, Constantinople, Russia, Crete, Macedonia, and elsewhere in order to collect alms under the name of the Holy Sepulchre. The annual income rose to over forty million piasters, and many of the monks of the Brotherhood lived in what resembled mansions. Patriarch Cyril would later be nicknamed the "Father of Gold".

Patriarch Dositheus II reports that upon the death of Patriarch Theophanes, the Ecumenical Patriarch Parthenios sought to extend Greek influence by personally ordaining the Patriarch of Jerusalem. The monks of the Brotherhood of the Holy Sepulchre who lived in Moldavia "in need of a sincere and amiable Patriarch and a leader, not a despot," propitiated Prince Vasile of Moldavia to nominate Abbot Paisios of Galta Monastery. Vasile wrote to the Patriarch of Constantinople, who then approved Paisios rather than confront the Prince. Since the people of Jerusalem did not elect him, Paisios, a relative of Patriarch Theophanes, traveled to Jerusalem with a royal official of Constantinople to try to force the people to recognize him. The Bishops recognized him, but the vast majority of clergy and monastics who were indigenous, opposed him and made a pile of stones to resist him. Paisios bribed the local authorities to make it illegal to disrespect him and filed a lawsuit against the people, at which they backed down. Paisios went further than Germanus by enacting a law such that no indigenous Orthodox could be accepted not only to the bishopric, but to any clerical or monastic order, or even as a reader or attendant in a monastery.

Upon the death of Paisios, the monks of the Brotherhood dwelling in the Jerusalemite Metochion in Constantinople with the help of Prince Vasile were able to elect Nectarios as Patriarch of Jerusalem. However, he soon resigned after seven years due to the constant harassment of the Greek monks of the Brotherhood when he refused to persecute indigenous Orthodox.

Members of the Brotherhood took up the practice of only commemorating Greek patriarchs, dating back to either Germanus with the Jerusalem Patriarchate, or to Sylvester with Patriarchs of Antioch.

French author Eugene Bori in "The Holy Land" accuses the Greek monks of being foreign embezzlers, which Patriarch Constantios argued against using a revisionist history where the people and clergy of Jerusalem have been Greek since the very beginning, denying the reality of any Arab or Palestinian Orthodox position of Patriarch of Jerusalem.

=== Decline of the Brotherhood and internal controversies ===
The Brotherhood elected Metropolitan Cyril, who moved the headquarters of the Brotherhood from Constantinople to Jerusalem, fearing the disintegration of the Brotherhood due to the large Roman Catholic influence and the immoral and luxurious lifestyle of the monks. He established a seminary in the Monastery of El-Musalanah, which allowed indigenous Orthodox although with heavy discrimination. He also founded elementary schools in Palestine and an Arabic printing house and hospital. These concessions to the indigenous Orthodox were seen by the Brotherhood as a betrayal of their ethnic policy, and so he was eventually accused of partiality towards the Russians at the Council of Constantinople (1872) and deposed, Procopios being elected to take his place.

Procopios pledged to promote education among the people, but as soon as he took office, in order to appease the Brotherhood Procopios closed down the elementary schools and seminary opened by Cyril, and threw out all the indigenous people from poor homes belonging to the Church. He also launched persecution against the indigenous Orthodox by reporting them to the government as being Russian partisans.

In 1864 the immorality of the Brotherhood in Moldavia was seen as so atrocious that the government of Moldavia deported them and took possession of all their Monasteries and properties, changing them into charity homes and military places.

The Brotherhood in Jerusalem had begun imitating the abuses in the Catholic Church by selling indulgences to pilgrims, although ceasing for fear of bad press once it was made known. Many also resorted to baptizing dead infants. It became a custom for monks to have two or even three nuns as wives, and even pedophilia spread among the monks. The Brotherhood would often spread rumors of those who disagreed with its agenda or actions that they were mentally deranged, and would exile them. During a conversation between Patriarch Cyril and Archimandrite Porphyry, Patriarch Cyril admits that the Churches are lacking icons and priests are lacking proper vestments and resources, and he defends the practice of monks marrying nuns and of refusing to allow Arab translators, monks, clergy and schools. Porphyry accuses the Patriarch and states that "the kingdom of God will undoubtedly be taken away from you and given to others" and "the Orthodox Church has been corrupted because of you and is on the verge of death."

The Imperial Orthodox Palestine Society was founded in 1882, in part to help fight against the abuses of the Brotherhood.

In 1893 Saint Raphael Hawaweeny wrote "An Historical Glance at the Brotherhood of the Holy Sepulcher", attacking its abuses and ethnic discrimination under a Pseudonym. When this was discovered he was expelled and escaped to Russia. Saint Raphael Hawaweeny believed that once the control of the Sepulchre became based on a tenuous ethnic claim rather than local Church or state authority, this led to the many disputes over the Holy Places, and that "these disputes ... will never cease so long as the Greek monks of Jerusalem continue to control the Jerusalemite church and are domineering the Holy Sepulchre and all the Holy Places contrary to every canon and law."

=== Modern Brotherhood ===
Inspired by the Young Turk revolution, Palestinian Orthodox began a series of meetings with Patriarch Damianos demanding indigenous representation, which was repeatedly denied. In November 1908 there were demonstrations in Jerusalem and protests in Jaffa and Bethlehem. Chief Secretary Meletios Metaxakis began rumors in the Brotherhood that Damianos was secretly supportive of the indigenous Orthodox, and with the help of Chrysostomos Papadopoulos and the support of Patriarch Photios of Alexandria and Patriarch Joachim of Constantinople, he called a midnight meeting of the whole Brotherhood of the Holy Sepulchre who unanimously decided to dethrone Damianos, formally enacting this the next morning on December 13.

Damianos refused to step down and was threatened with defrocking, but the Ottoman government stalled any final decision until January 20, formally recognizing the locum tenens and thus implicitly Damianos' deposition. In response, the protesters occupied the Patriarchate, and even local Muslims joined in.

Citing fears of public anarchy and the safety of the Brotherhood and its property, the deposition of Damianos was rescinded. Meletios and Chrysostomos lobbied Constantinople, but ended up being exiled from Jerusalem.

The British military governor Ronald Storrs wrote:

“The attempt to preserve it as less the Church of the Palestine Orthodox than as an outpost of Hellenism… was the source not only of constant intrigue and wire-pulling… but also of increasing discouragement and bitterness to the Orthodox Arabs of the country.” ... “The Adelfotis – the Orthodox Brotherhood – is an absolutely closed corporation: there were not Arab Metropolitans, Bishops or even Archimandrites, and a modern Arab Patriarch (though there have been such in the remote past) was about as probable a prelate as an English Pope.”

On the election of Patriarch Benedict I in 1957 the Jordanian government approved a law establishing new regulations concerning relations between the Brotherhood of the Holy Sepulchre and the indigenous Arab community of the Orthodox Church. The rules gave the Arab laity a role in the financial affairs of the Patriarchate, and required that the candidates for the offices of the patriarchate be citizens of Jordan, but the changes were discontinued after negotiation between the Patriarchate and the Jordanians.

== Organisation ==
Jordanian Law No. 227, dated 16 January 1958, regulates the Brotherhood's government.

=== Holy places ===
- Church of the Nativity in Bethlehem
- Site of Christ's baptism in the River Jordan (Al-Maghtas & Qasr el Yahud)
- Mount Tabor
- Nazareth, the city of the Annunciation (the Church of St Gabriel)
- The Sea of Galilee (also known as the Lake of Gennesaret and the Sea of Tiberias)
  - Capernaum, the "Town of Jesus"
- Cana
- Jacob's Well in Nablus.

=== Status quo ===
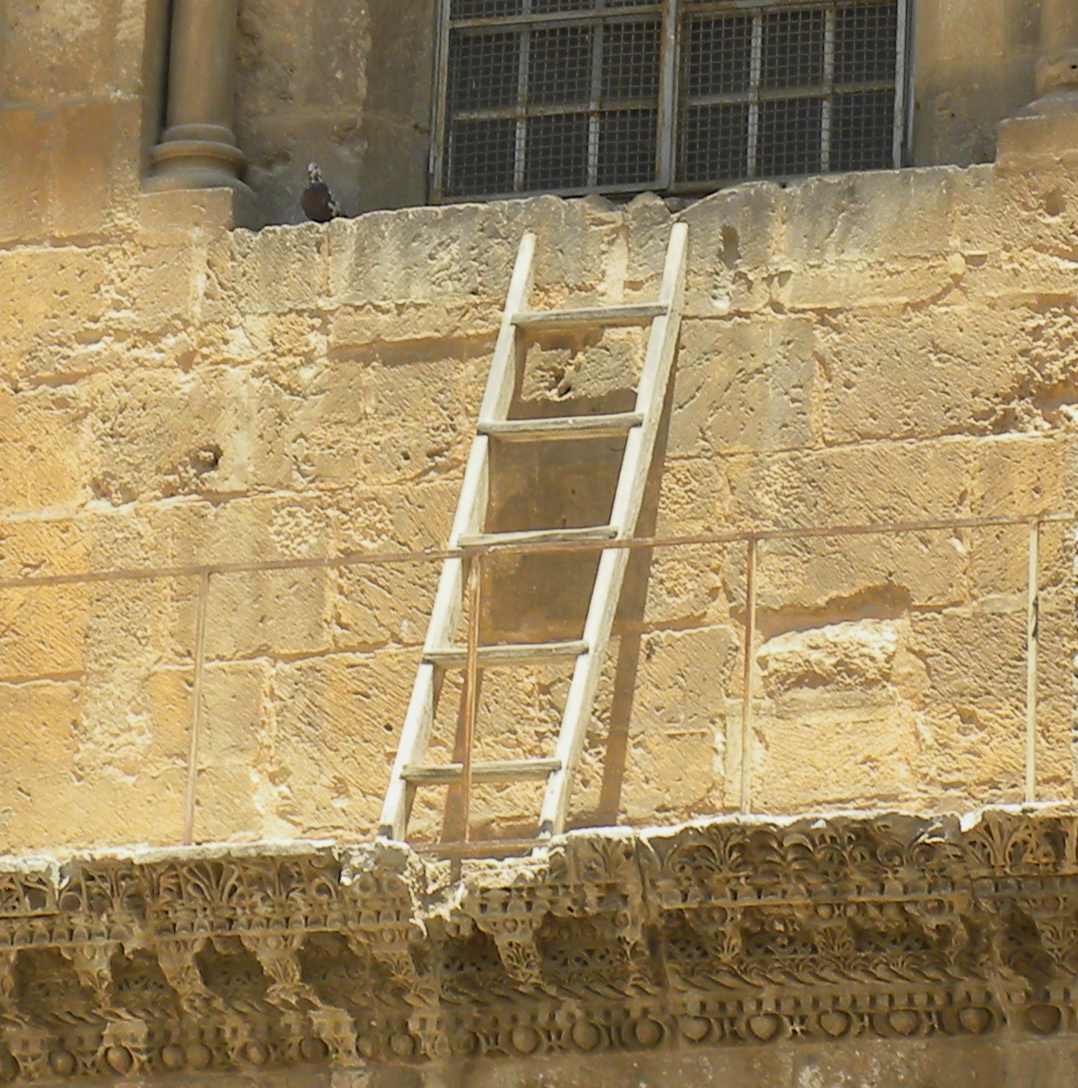
The immovable ladder. Detail from photograph of main entrance above, 2011

After the renovation of 1555, control of the Church of the Holy Sepulchre oscillated between the Roman Catholic Franciscans and the Orthodox, depending on which community could obtain a favorable firman, or decree, from the Ottoman government; this was sometimes achieved through outright bribery, with violent clashes not uncommon. In 1757, weary of the squabbling, the Porte issued a firman that divided the church among the claimants. This was confirmed in 1852 with another firman that made the arrangement permanent, establishing a status quo of territorial division among the communities.

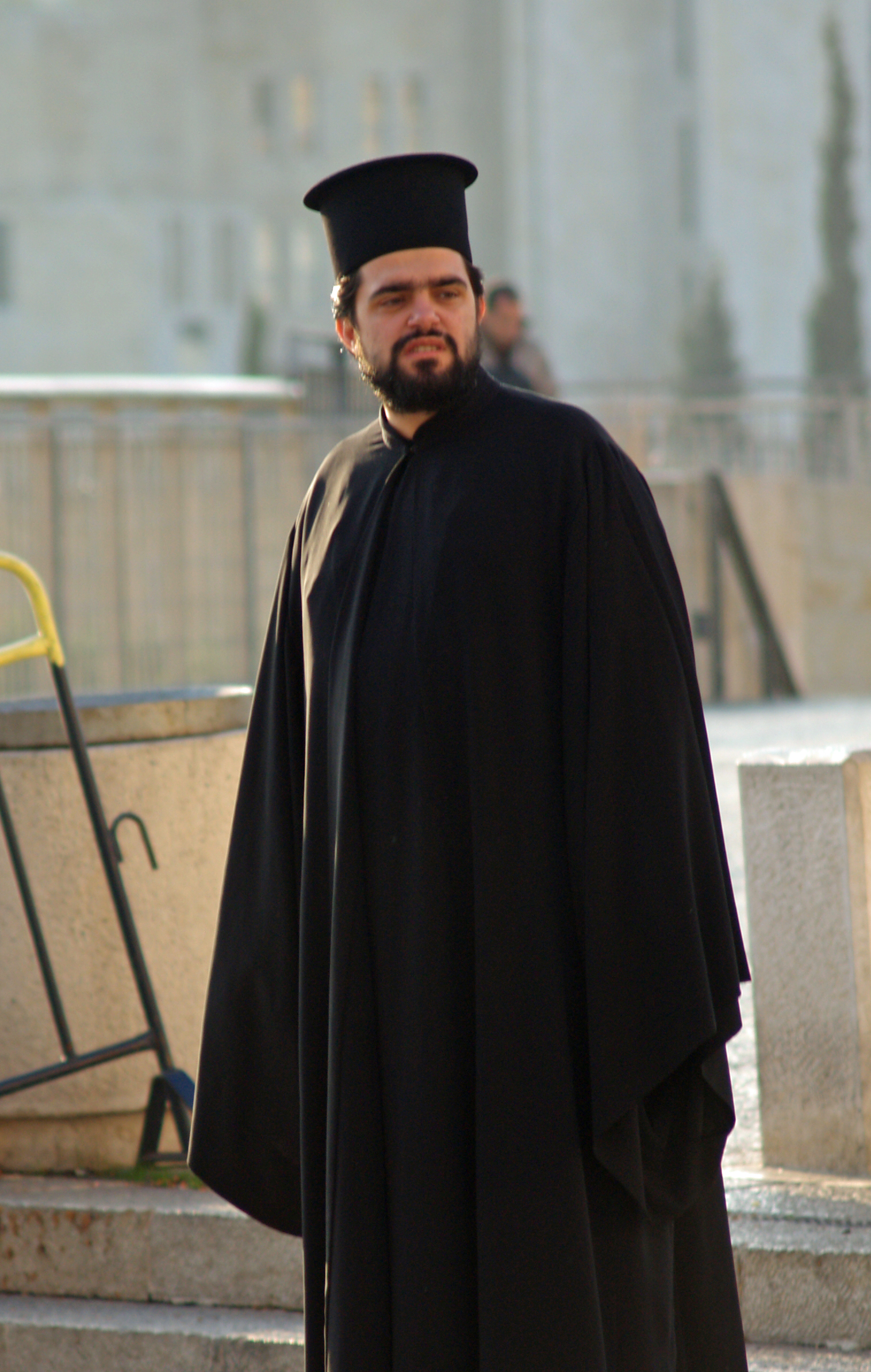
Greek Orthodox priest of the Brotherhood of the Holy Sepulchre in Jerusalem

The primary custodians are the Greek Orthodox Church, which has the lion's share; the Custodian of the Holy Land, an official of the Franciscans affiliated with the Latin Patriarchate of Jerusalem & the Armenian patriarchate. In the 19th century, the local Coptic Orthodox archdiocese, the local Ethiopian Orthodox people and the local Syriac Orthodox archbishopric acquired lesser responsibilities, which include shrines and other structures within and around the building. Times and places of worship for each community are strictly regulated in common areas.

Under the status quo, no part of what is designated as common territory may be so much as rearranged without consent from all communities. This often leads to the neglect of badly needed repairs when the communities cannot come to an agreement among themselves about the final shape of a project. Just such a disagreement has delayed the renovation of the edicule, where the need is now dire, but also where any change in the structure might result in a change to the status quo disagreeable to one or more of the communities.

A less grave sign of this state of affairs is located on a window ledge over the church's entrance. Someone placed a wooden ladder there sometime before 1852, when the status quo defined both the doors and the window ledges as common ground. The ladder remains there to this day, in almost exactly the same position. It can be seen to occupy the ledge in century-old photographs and engravings.

None of the communities controls the main entrance. In 1192, Saladin assigned responsibility for it to a Muslim family. The Joudeh Al-Goudia a noble family with a long history were entrusted with the keys as custodians. This arrangement has persisted into modern times.

==== Breaches of the status quo ====
The establishment of the status quo did not halt the violence, which continues to break out every so often even in modern times. For example, on a hot summer day in 2002, a Coptic monk, who was stationed on the roof to express Coptic claims over Ethiopian territory there, moved his chair from its agreed spot into the shade; this was interpreted as a hostile move by the Ethiopians, leading to an altercation that left eleven people hospitalized.

In another incident in 2004 during Orthodox celebrations of the Exaltation of the Holy Cross, a door to the Franciscan chapel was left open. This was taken as a sign of disrespect by the Orthodox and a fistfight broke out. Some participants were arrested, but no one was seriously injured.

On Palm Sunday, in April 2008, a brawl broke out due to a Greek monk being ejected from the building by a rival faction. Police were called to the scene but were also attacked by the enraged brawlers. A clash erupted between Armenian and Greek monks on Sunday 9 November 2008, during celebrations for the Feast of the Holy Cross.

== See also ==
- Greek Orthodox Patriarch of Jerusalem
- Fathers of the Holy Sepulchre
- Custody of the Holy Land
- Order of the Holy Sepulchre
- Palestinian Christians
- Ethnophyletism
