= Master of the Housebook =

German painter and engraver (c. 1450–1500)

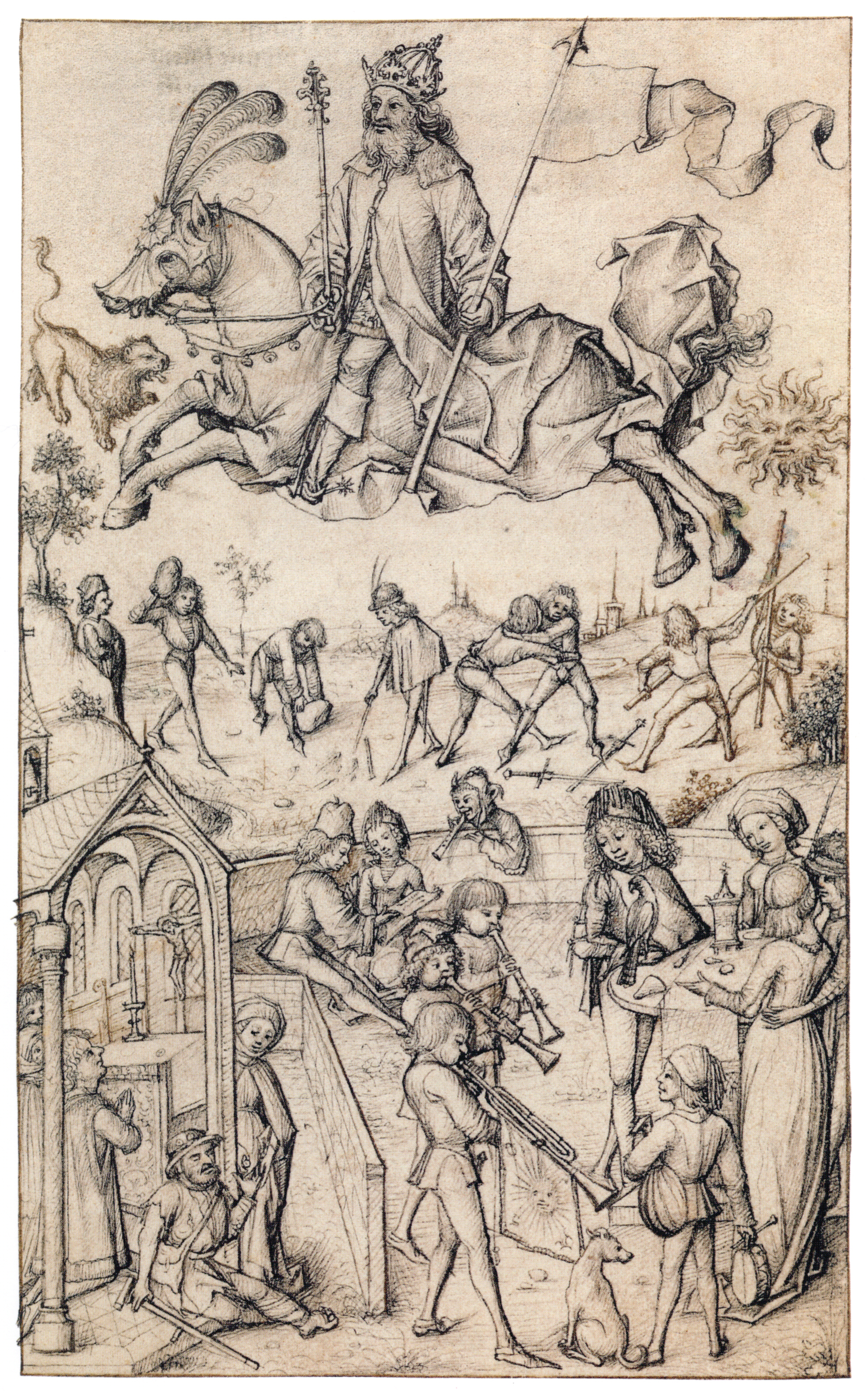
The Sun and his children, drawing from the "Housebook"

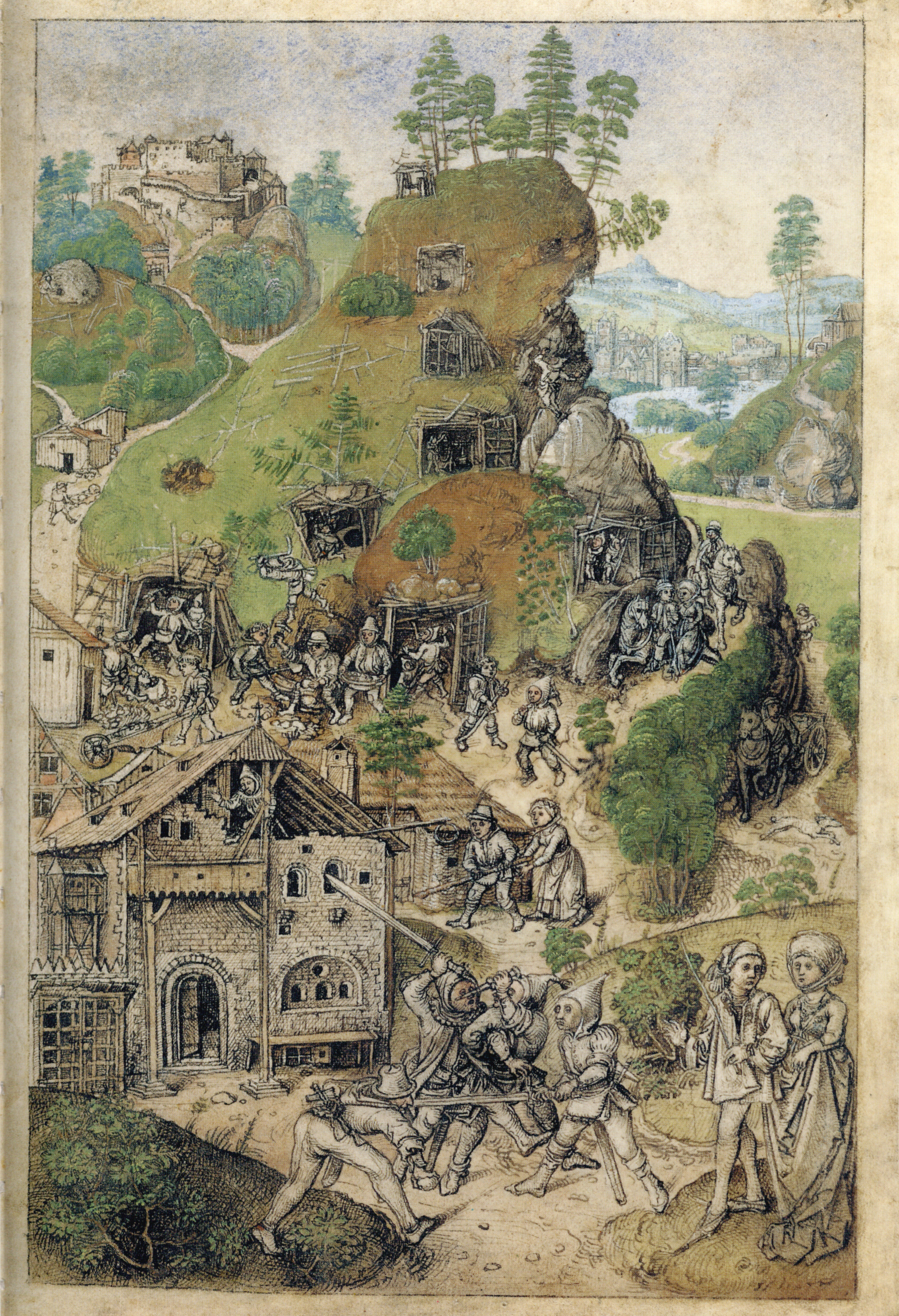
Venus and Mars, drawing with watercolour from the "Housebook", with a mine in the background.

Master of the Housebook and Master of the Amsterdam Cabinet are two conventional names used for an engraver and painter working in South Germany in the last quarter of the 15th century. He is apparently the first artist to use drypoint, a form of engraving, for all of his prints (other than woodcuts he may have designed). The first name derives from his book of drawings with watercolour, called the Medieval Housebook, which belonged to the German noble family of Waldburg-Wolfegg from the 17th century until 2008, when they were reported to have sold it for €20 million to a Swiss buyer; however, the legality of its sale for export has been challenged and, for the moment, it remains with the family. In 1999, the book was lent to the National Gallery of Art in Washington, D.C., for an exhibition. The majority of his surviving prints are in the print room at the Rijksmuseum in Amsterdam, hence his second name. Most, but not all, art historians still agree that the Housebook and the prints are by the same artist.

== Work ==
His ninety-one prints are extremely rare, with sixty surviving in one impression (copy) only, and none in more than five – there are a total of 124 impressions, 80 in Amsterdam. It is thought that because his prints were made using only the shallow, scratched line of drypoint, probably on tin or a pewter-type alloy, only ten to twenty impressions of each could be taken before the plate wore out. Many engravings by other artists are believed to be copies of missing works by this master. In particular, Israhel van Meckenem seems to have copied more than thirty.

His work is very well drawn and lively, with the interest in detail typical of Early Netherlandish painting. Arthur Mayger Hind notes of his style that "he is an artist with a freedom of draughtsmanship quite remarkable at this epoch. If his manner of engraving has something of the irregularity of an amateur, his power of expression is vigorous and masterly."

A high proportion depicts secular subjects, more than is typical with artists of the period. Along with his contemporary Martin Schongauer, the Housebook Master was the leading artist making old master prints in Germany in his period. Both Schongauer and the Housebook Master had a considerable influence on the prints of Albrecht Dürer. The Master suggests Netherlandish influence in the modelling of light and shade and in some of his figural types.

A small number of paintings are also thought to be his work, notably the Pair of Lovers in the Ducal Museum Gotha, the Speyer Altarpiece (divided among Gemäldegalerie, Berlin, the Städel, Frankfurt, and Augustiner Museum Freiburg, and the Holy Family (Nuremberg, Germanisches Nationalmuseum, since 2004). However, many scholars feel the Gotha Lovers and the Speyer Altarpiece cannot be by the same artist, and favour attributing only the Lovers to the Housebook Master. Others disagree, and attribute the engravings and the altarpiece to the same master.

== Erhard Reuwich ==
It was first suggested in 1936 that he should be identified as Erhard Reuwich of Utrecht, an artist and (or) printer working in Mainz, who designed and signed an influential 5-foot-long (1.5 m) woodcut panoramic view of Venice made following a visit in 1483 or 1484 during a pilgrimage to the Holy Land. Reuwich printed the account in Latin of the trip, the Sanctae Peregrinationes by Bernhard von Breydenbach of 1486, in which the woodcut was the first ever fold-out plate. The design was later adapted by Michael Wolgemut for the Nuremberg Chronicle. Reuwich was taken as an artist in the entourage of Breydenbach, a wealthy canon of Mainz Cathedral. The book also contained vedute of six other cities, including Jerusalem, studies of Near Eastern costume, and an exotic alphabet – the first in print. It was a bestseller, reprinted thirteen times over the next three decades, including editions printed in France and Spain, for which the illustration blocks were shipped out to the local printers.

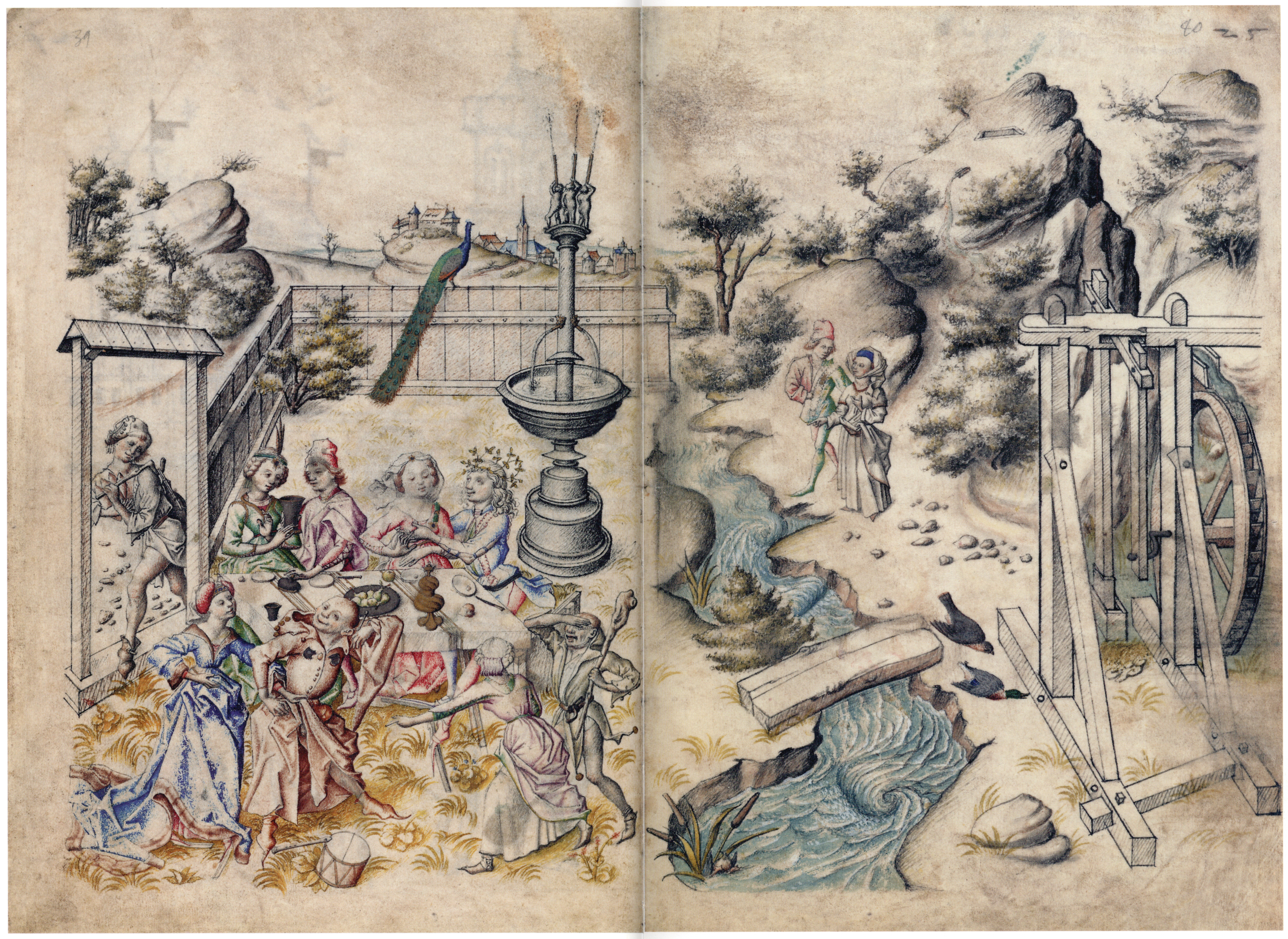
Lover's Garden, drawing from the Housebook

In 1485 Reuwich drew some plants for the woodcuts in a herbal also published in Mainz.

His identification with the Housebook Master has not been generally accepted, though A. Hyatt Mayor supported it; other suggestions have also been made. The trend of scholarly opinion has moved against the identification in more recent works in the 1980s. The design of the woodcuts for a 1473 edition of the Speculum Humanae Salvationis has been attributed to the Housebook Master.
