= Elzear Horn =

German Catholic monk

Elzear Horn (Latin: Elzearius; 1690 or 1691–28 November 1744) was a German Catholic friar and missionary of the Franciscan Order who is best known for his travelogues of Palestine.

Horn was born in the vicinity of the Franconian town of Hammelburg in the Holy Roman Empire. He took religious vows as a friar in c. 1708 and was ordained to the priesthood c. 1712. In 1720 he visited the Holy Land for the first time; from 1725 to 1726 he was at the head of the Franciscan Order's Custody of the Holy Land, and from 1737 to 1738 he served as the choir director and secretary of the Monastery of Saint Saviour in Jerusalem, then part of the Ottoman Empire.

Horn's writings, particularly Ichnographiæ locorum et monumentorum vete-rum Terræ Sanctæ, accurate delineatæ et descriptæ, are an extensive source of information about the monuments, particularly churches, and life in 18th-century Jerusalem. At this time, various Christian denominations vied for power in Muslim-ruled Jerusalem, including the Greek Orthodox, Roman Catholics, and Armenians. The Christians had less love for each other than they had for the Muslims: Horn, for example, referred to the Greeks simply as "the Vomit". Yet Horn also states that the Franciscan friars treated sick people regardless of religious affiliation, and he himself is known to have employed a Jewish physician from Italy. Horn is one of the principal sources of information about the pharmacy at Saint Saviour. Among Horn's most valuable works are the description and drawing of the subsequently destroyed tomb of King Baldwin V of Jerusalem, which Israeli art historian Zehava Jacoby used to reconstruct the boy king's tomb.

Horn's drawings

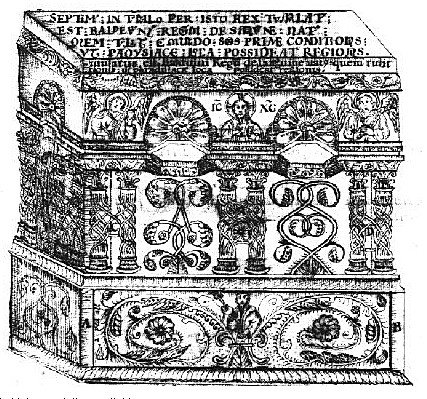
Tomb of Baldwin V, located in the Chapel of Adam

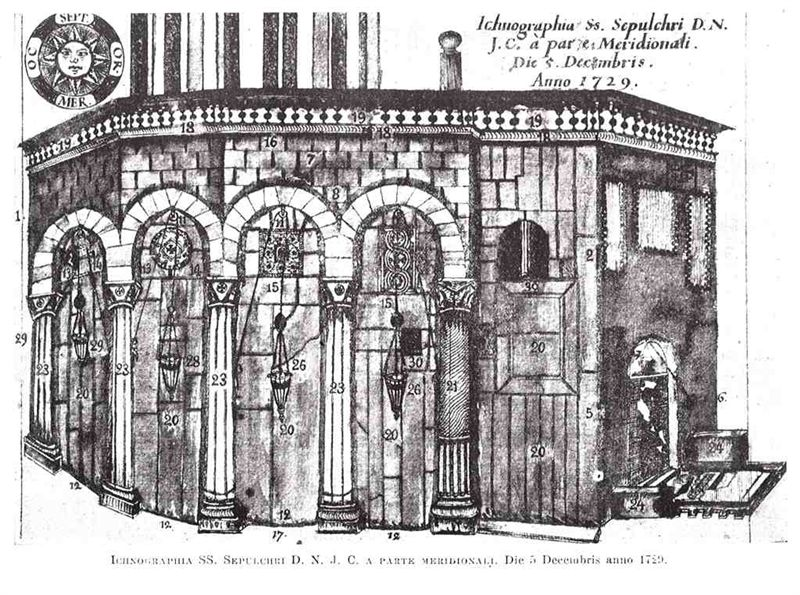
The small chapel around the tomb of Jesus, called the Aedicula

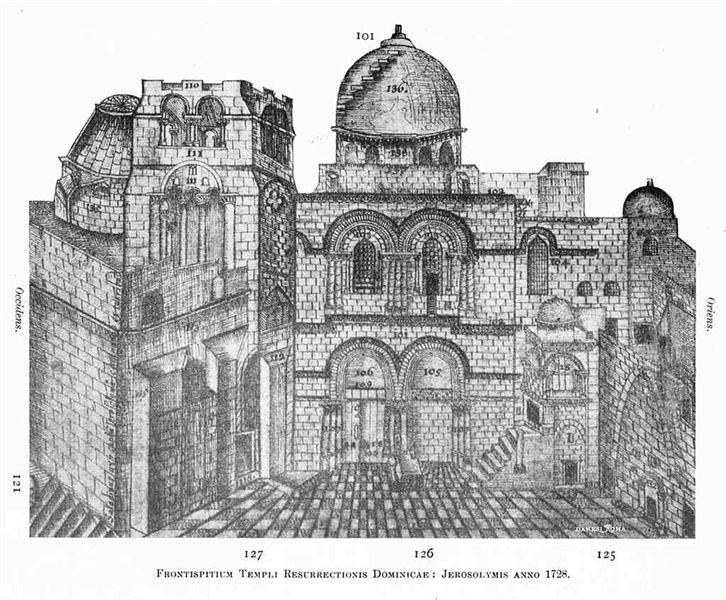
The Holy Sepulchre, featuring the immovable ladder oldest known depiction

In 1738 Horn travelled to the province of Thuringia but soon returned to the Holy Land, where he spent the rest of his life. He died in Acre (Ptolemais) in Ottoman Syria on 28 November 1744 at the age of 52.
