= Felix Fabri =

Swiss Dominican theologian (1441–1502)

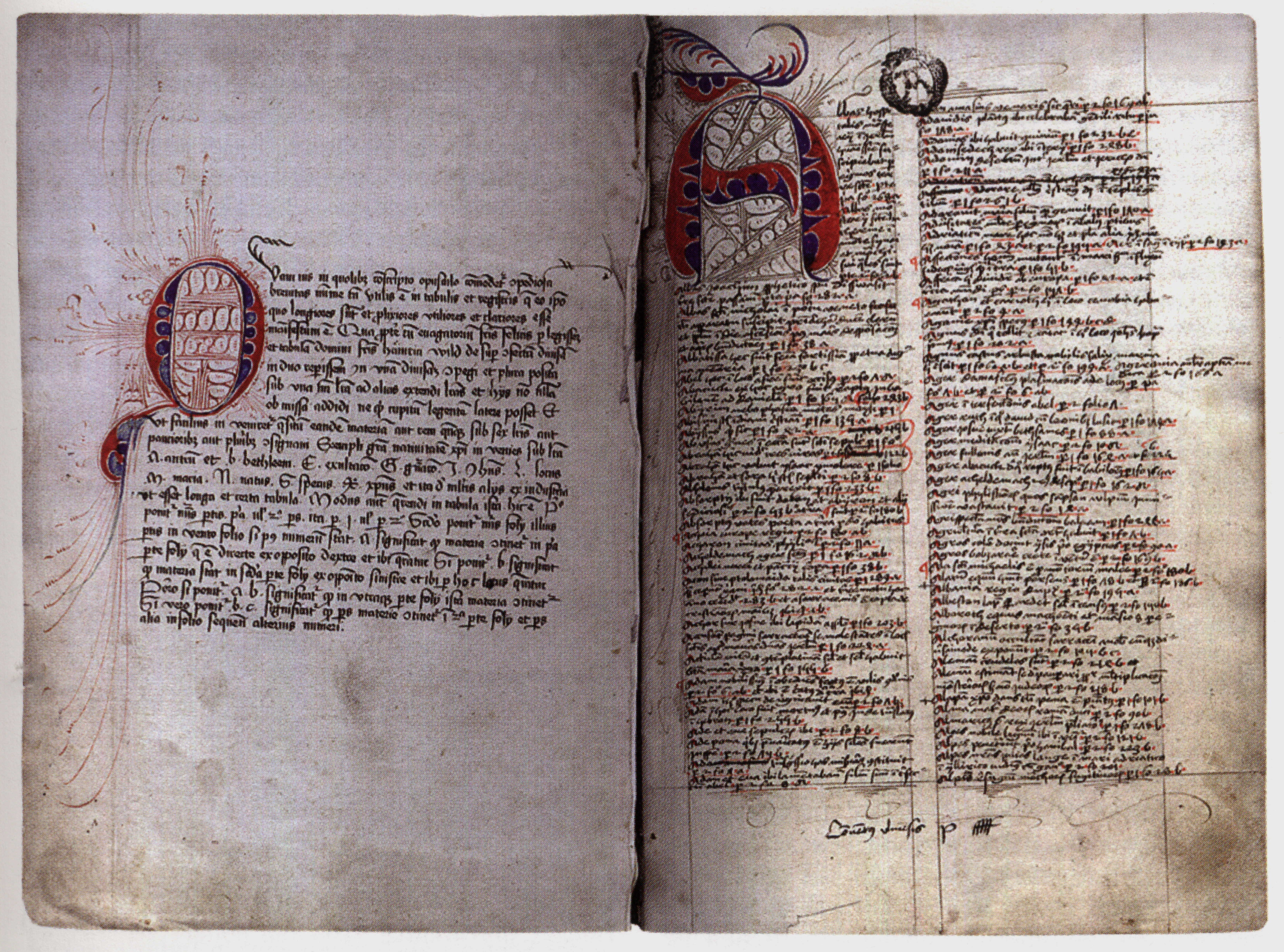
A page of Felix Fabri's Evagatorium, from 1484 to 1488

Felix Fabri (also spelt Faber; 1441 – 1502) was a Swiss Dominican theologian. He left vivid and detailed descriptions of his pilgrimages to Palestine (including the earliest accounts of Jerusalem syndrome). In 1489 authored a book on the history of Swabia, 'Historia Suevorum'.

He made his early studies under the Dominicans at Basel and Ulm, where he spent most of his life.

"Faber" is the Latin nominative singular form of his surname. He is often referred to as "Fabri", the Latin genitive singular, i.e. the possessive form, because his name appears this way in the title of his book, Fratris Felicis Fabri Evagatorium in Terræ Sanctæ, Arabiæ et Egypti peregrinationem (The Wanderings of Brother Felix Fabri in the Pilgrimage to the Holy Land, Arabia, and Egypt).

One of Fabri's companions during his 1483–84 pilgrimage to the Holy Land was Hungarian poet and cleric János Lászai (Latin: Johannes de Lazo).

In Jerusalem, he met Bernhard von Breidenbach.

A fictional account of Fabri's journey to, and time in, the Holy Land is found in the book A Stolen Tongue, by Sheri Holman.

The memoir The Book of Wanderings (2015) by Kimberly Meyer is an account of her pilgrimage with her daughter, retracing Fabri's journey from Ulm to Alexandria.

== Bibliography ==
- Fabri, Felix (1848): Fratris Felicis Fabri Evagatorium in Terrae sanctae, Arabiae et Aegypti peregrinationem: 3 vol. in Latin. Vol 1. The full text, google-books,
- Fabri, Felix (1849): Fratris Felicis Fabri Evagatorium in Terræ Sanctæ, Arabiæ et Egypti peregrinationem in Latin. Vol 3. The full text, google-books,
- Fabri, Felix (1896). Felix Fabri (circa 1480–1483 A.D.) vol I, part I. Palestine Pilgrims' Text Society.
- Fabri, Felix (1896). Felix Fabri (circa 1480–1483 A.D.) vol I, part II. Palestine Pilgrims' Text Society.
- Fabri, Felix (1893). Felix Fabri (circa 1480–1483 A.D.) vol II, part I. Palestine Pilgrims' Text Society.
- Fabri, Felix (1893). Felix Fabri (circa 1480–1483 A.D.) vol II, part II. Palestine Pilgrims' Text Society. with p. 677: Index

== Sources ==
- Jean Meyers, Félix Fabri. Les errances de Frère Félix, pélerin en Terre sainte, en Arabie et en Égypte (1480–1483). Tome I : Premier et deuxième traités. Montpellier : Publications de l'Université Paul-Valéry et du CERCAM, 2000, 438 p.
- Félix Fabri. Les errances de Frère Félix, pélerin en Terre sainte, en Arabie et en Égypte (1480–1483). Tome II : Troisième et quatrième traités. Texte Latin, introduction, traduction et notes sous la direction de Jean Meyers et Nicole Chareyron, Montpellier : Publications de l'Université Paul-Valéry et du CERCAM, 2003, 453 p.
- Murray, G.W. (1956). "Felix Fabri's pilgrimage from Gaza to Mount Sinai and Cairo, A.D. 1483". The Geographical Journal. 122 (3): 335–342. Bibcode:1956GeogJ.122..335M. doi:10.2307/1791014. JSTOR 1791014.
- Prescott, H. F. M. (1950). Friar Felix at Large: A Fifteenth-century Pilgrimage to the Holy Land. Yale University Press.
- Prescott, H.F.M. (1954). Jerusalem journey, pilgrimage to the Holy Land in the fifteenth century. London: Eyre & Spottiswoode.
- Prescott, H.F.M. (1958). Once to Sinai : Further Pilgrimage of Friar Felix Fabri. The Macmillan Company.
- Pilgrimage Yesterday and Today (1988) J. G. Davies, SCM Press Ltd.
