= Zehava Jacoby =

Israeli art historian (1940–1999)

Zehava Jacoby (Hebrew: זהבה יעקובי; née Sophia Feigenbaum; 24 January 1940 – December 1999) was an Israeli art historian who specialized in Crusader art.

Jacoby was born in Lwów, Poland (now Lviv, Ukraine). Her father, Yosef Feigenbaum, was killed in the Holocaust; her mother, Ella (née Fabian), survived by escaping a train that was taking her to an extermination camp and joined the Polish resistance. During this time Jacoby, baptized and renamed Barbara, lived hidden in the home of a Polish woman. After the war, she was reunited with her mother; from 1945 to 1949, they wandered through Poland, Germany, Italy, and South America. In 1949, they settled in Israel, but the mother died the same year.

In 1964, Jacoby earned a bachelor's degree in English literature and Hebrew literature at the Hebrew University. She started teaching in the art history department of the University of Haifa in 1970, gained a master's degree in art history in 1972, and became a senior lecturer in 1973. In 1976, Jacoby received a doctorate from the Hebrew University. From 1978 until 1982, she headed the University of Haifa's art department. Her specialty was the Romanesque and Crusader sculpture, and she devoted most of her time to the sculptures in Israel. Using an 18th-century drawing by Elzear Horn, Jacoby was able to suggest a reconstruction of the tomb of King Baldwin V of Jerusalem, which had been destroyed in 1808.

Jacoby was married to historian David Jacoby, with whom she had two daughters. She died suddenly in December 1999. Her life's work, an 800-photograph inventory of the remains of Crusader sculpture in Israel, was left unfinished. Her family donated the fruit of her research, a collection of photographs of Crusader sculpture in Israel, to the Younes and Soraya Nazarian Library, which preserved it and made it accessible to the public.
