= Tomb of Baldwin V =

Tomb of a king of Jerusalem

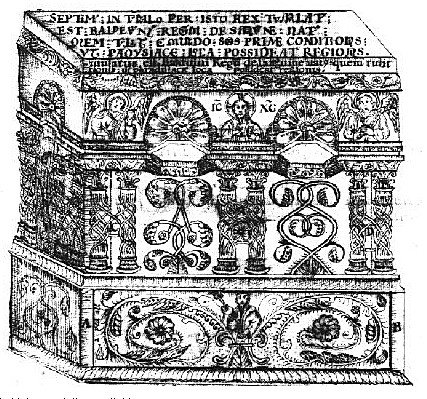
An illustration of Baldwin V's tomb by Elzear Horn, which helped art historian Zehava Jacoby reconstruct the tomb

The tomb of Baldwin V is the best known among the tombs of the kings of Jerusalem and an important example of crusader art.

Baldwin V reigned as the king of Jerusalem from 1185 until his death at the age of eight in 1186. He was buried in the Church of the Holy Sepulchre in the city of Jerusalem as the last of seven Latin monarchs buried there. His mother, Sibylla, ascended the throne after his death. It is presumably she who commissioned the construction of Baldwin V's tomb, which would mean that it was paid for from the royal funds. The construction was entrusted to the workshop of the Temple Area and proceeded quickly; the tomb had been finished when, a little over a year after Baldwin's death, the city of Jerusalem was captured by the Egyptian Muslim ruler Saladin.

Baldwin's tomb stood in the Holy Sepulchre's Chapel of Adam, where it impressed pilgrims and other visitors for centuries. It is mentioned in several travel accounts; in c. 1728, German friar Elzear Horn took a step further, measuring and illustrating the tombs of Baldwin V and three of his predecessors (Godfrey, Baldwin I, and either Baldwin II or Fulk). Horn identified the tomb as that of the child monarch on the basis of its epitaph and the small size (128 cm (50 in) in length).

An 1808 fire destroyed the tombs of the Latin kings. Fragments of the tombs were salvaged and inserted into the Greek section of the Holy Sepulchre, where they remained until the restoration works in the 1940s and 1970s. Horn's work enabled Israeli art historian Zehava Jacoby to propose a reconstruction of Baldwin V's tomb.

In a sharp contrast to the austere tombs of his predecessors, and "inversely proportional to his political significance", Baldwin V's tomb was richly decorated with large marble panels featuring acanthus ornaments; half-length portraits of Jesus and angels; conch-shaped niches; and knotted columns, which were a distinctive mark of the Temple Area workshop.
