= H. F. M. Prescott =

English historian and novelist (1896–1972)

Hilda Frances Margaret Prescott, more usually known as H. F. M. Prescott (22 February 1896 – 5 May 1972), was an English writer, academic and historian. She was made a Fellow of the Royal Society of Literature. Her best-known work is a novel, The Man on a Donkey, set in the 16th century.

== Biography ==
She was born in Cheshire, the daughter of Rev James Mulleneux Prescott and his wife Margaret (née Warburton). She was educated at Wallasey High School. She read Modern History at Lady Margaret Hall, University of Oxford, where she received her first M.A. Subsequently, she was awarded a second M.A. at Manchester University, where she did research under the direction of Thomas Frederick Tout, professor of Medieval and Modern History.

In 1943 Hilda Prescott was appointed tutor at St Mary's College, University of Durham and then Vice-Principal from 1944 to 1948. She was awarded an honorary D.Litt. by the University of Durham some years later after publication of her The Man on a Donkey in 1952. In 1958, she was elected Jubilee Research Fellow at Royal Holloway College in the University of London, where she worked on Thomas Wolsey.

H.F.M. Prescott is best known for her historical novel The Man on a Donkey. Written in the form of a chronicle, the book tells the story of the Pilgrimage of Grace, a popular rising in protest at the Dissolution of the Monasteries by Henry VIII. The book is still in print, the latest edition being published in December 2016 by Apollo, London, ISBN 9781784977719.

Her biography of Mary I of England, Mary Tudor (originally titled Spanish Tudor), which won the James Tait Black Prize in 1941, remains one of the leading works on Mary I's troubled life and reign and is named by the Encyclopædia Britannica as the best biography of the monarch.

H.F.M. Prescott wrote one thriller, Dead and Not Buried, and this was adapted for CBS's Climax! television series under the screen title of Bury Me Later in 1954.

As the daughter of a clergyman, H.F.M. Prescott was a committed member of the Church of England and her wide-ranging interests included travel and the English countryside. H.F.M. Prescott was an early supporter of Amnesty International, the human rights organisation, and of the Consumers' Association (Which?), and a member of the English-Speaking Union. She was a woman of refined but simple tastes, and lived for many years quietly with her dogs in the small Oxfordshire town of Charlbury.

She died on 5 May 1972.

== Commemoration ==
A biography of Hilda Frances Margaret Prescott was published in the Oxford Dictionary of National Biography in December 2020.

== Works ==
- The Unhurrying Chase (1925). Published by Constable & Co
- The Lost Fight (1928). Published by Constable & Co
- Son of Dust (1932). Published by Constable & Co
- Dead and Not Buried (1938)
- Spanish Tudor (1940). Published by Constable & Co
- The Man on a Donkey (1952). Published by Eyre & Spottiswoode
- Jerusalem Journey (1954). Published by Eyre & Spottiswoode
- Once to Sinai: The further pilgrimage of Friar Felix Fabri (1957). Published by Eyre & Spottiswoode

== Translation ==
- Flamenca (1930). Published by Constable & Co (Attributed to Bernardet the Troubadour. Translated from the Thirteenth-Century Provençal by H F M Prescott)
