= Immovable Ladder =

Ladder on the Church of the Holy Sepulchre

Coordinates: 31°46′41.9″N 35°13′47.5″E

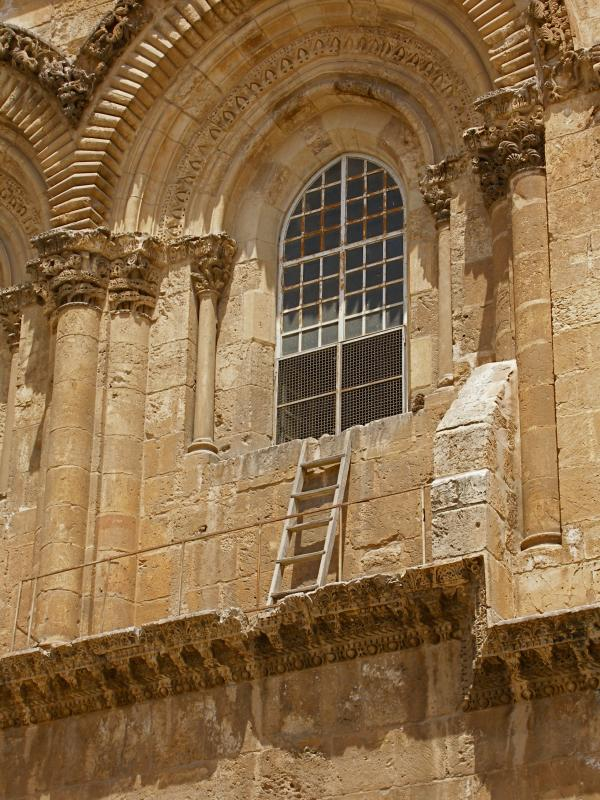
The ladder in 2009

The Immovable Ladder is a wooden ladder that has been leaning against a window of the Church of the Holy Sepulchre in the Old City of Jerusalem since at least the 1720s, protected from removal or alteration under the law of the Status Quo.

The ladder rests on a ledge and is attached to the right window of the second tier of the facade, owned by the Armenian Apostolic Church. It is used as a symbol of inter-confessional disputes within Christianity. Its presence in its current location signifies the adherence to an agreement among six Christian denominations, who collectively own the church, not to move, repair, or alter anything in the church without the consent of all six denominations.

== History ==
The appearance of the Immovable Ladder on the facade of the Church of the Holy Sepulchre is linked to conflicts between Christian denominations over control of the sanctuaries of the Holy Sepulchre and the division of the church among six Christian denominations. Various parts of the church are now owned by the Catholic Church, Greek Orthodox Church, Armenian Apostolic Church, Syriac Orthodox Church, Ethiopian Orthodox Church, and Coptic Orthodox Church.

=== Background ===
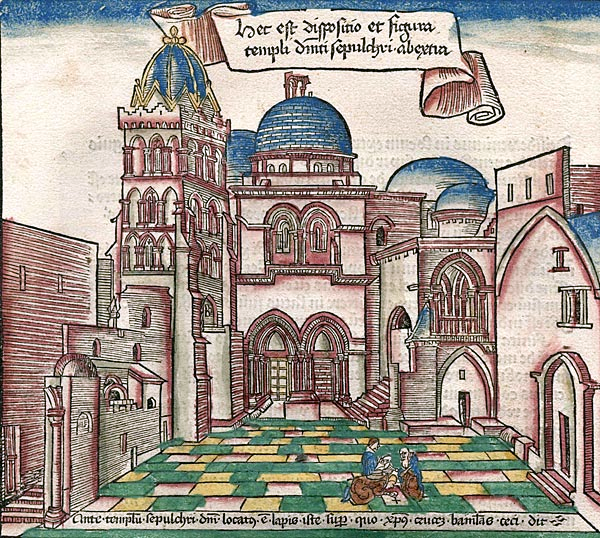
Woodcut of the church facade by Bernhard von Breidenbach, 1486

The struggle for control over Christian sanctuaries in Jerusalem dates back to the events described in the New Testament.

From the 16th century, inter-confessional conflicts among Christians over the right to control the sanctuaries became increasingly fierce. Virtually all Christian denominations participated in these conflicts, but Catholics and Greek Orthodox Christians—the most numerous, wealthy, and influential communities—were particularly hostile to each other.

During the period when Jerusalem was under the rule of the Mamluks of Egypt (14th–15th centuries), the Franciscans, thanks to European monarchs who provided them with financial and political support, managed to establish themselves as the "custodians of the Holy Sepulchre", as well as some other holy places. The Greek Orthodox Christians, seeking to challenge the rights granted to the Franciscans, presented a document allegedly received from Caliph Umar in the 7th century, transferring all rights to Christian sanctuaries to them. The Catholics, in turn, questioned the authenticity of this document, calling it a later forgery, and claimed that in the 7th century Christianity was still unified, so the caliph's decree, even if genuine, applied to all Christian denominations. Catholics also referred to their continuity from the Crusaders and accused the Orthodox of not participating in the Crusades.

The conflicts in the Church of the Holy Sepulchre occurred constantly. The Ottoman government issued decrees regulating relations between Christian denominations; such decrees were issued in 1604, 1637, 1673, 1757, and 1852.

In 1719, the Franciscans achieved a diplomatic victory, as a special decree from the Sultan allowed them to independently, without the involvement of other Christian denominations, carry out restoration work in the Church of the Holy Sepulchre. (Note: In exchange for this, the Porte negotiated the release of 150 Turkish prisoners of war held by the Europeans in previous wars)

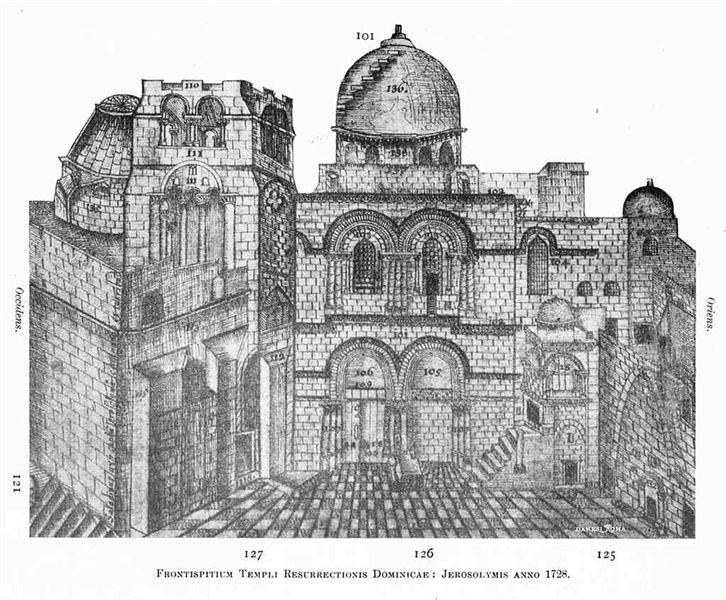
Engraving by Elzéar Horn, 1728

The exact date of the ladder's appearance on the facade of the church is unknown. Perhaps the oldest depiction of the ladder is in an engraving by the Franciscan monk Elzear Horn, dated by the Custody of the Holy Land to 1728. Additionally, the ladder is depicted in an engraving by Edward Francis Finden, published in 1834. After this date, the ladder is depicted in numerous engravings, lithographs, and photographs. The ladder itself belongs to the Armenian Apostolic Church, as Armenians have the right to use the cornice, accessing it through their window during religious festivals. However, Israeli writer Amos Elon claimed in his 1995 book that the ladder belongs to the Greek Orthodox Church and must remain in place due to the strict adherence to the "Status Quo". The Christian Information Center of Jerusalem also insists on this version of the ladder's presence on the facade: "The Short Ladder is part of the facade of the Church of the Holy Sepulchre due to the Status Quo."

=== Purpose of the ladder ===
There are several theories regarding the ladder's original purposes.

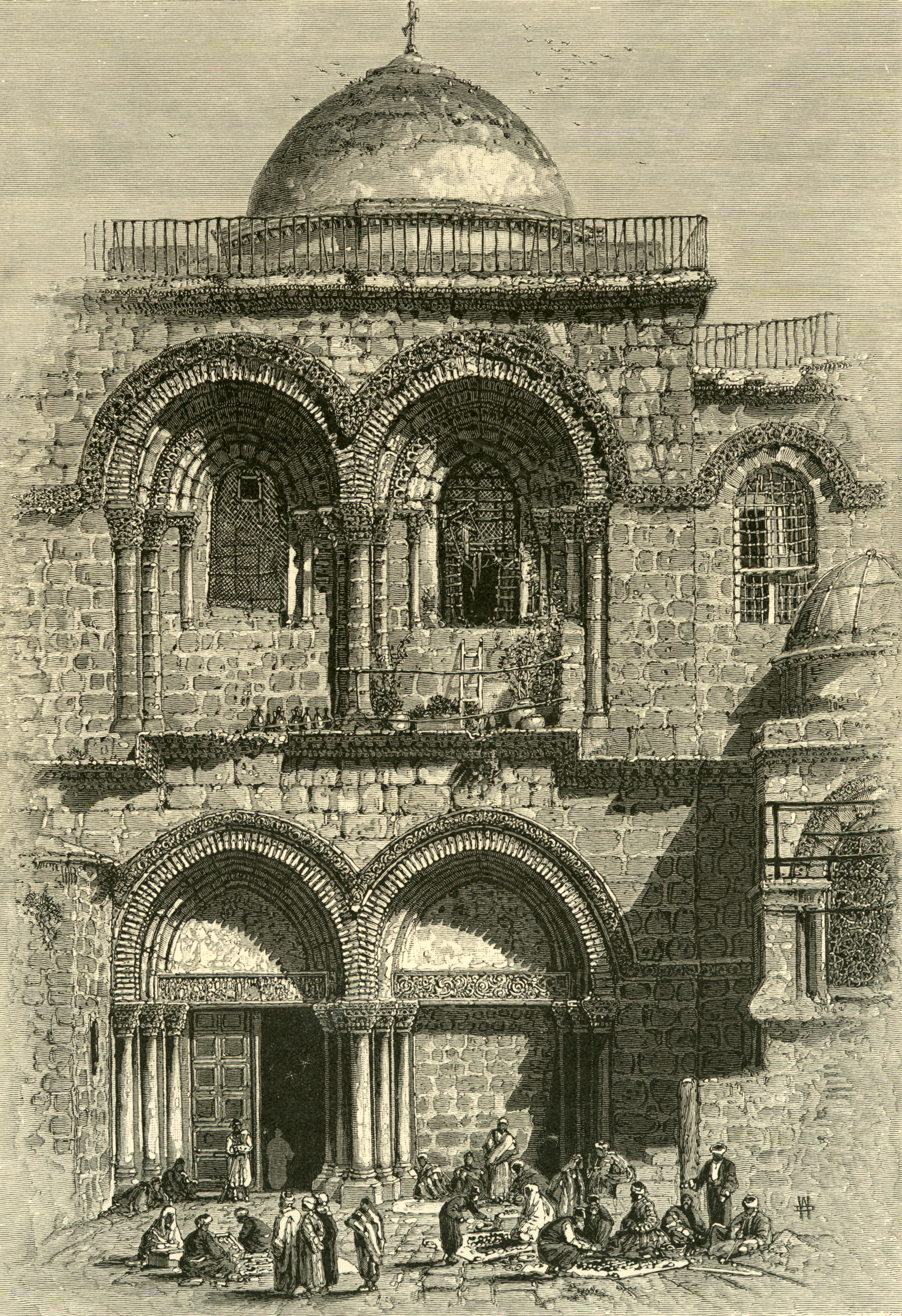
Entrance to the Church of the Holy Sepulchre, 1881–1884, engraving from a drawing by Charles William Wilson.

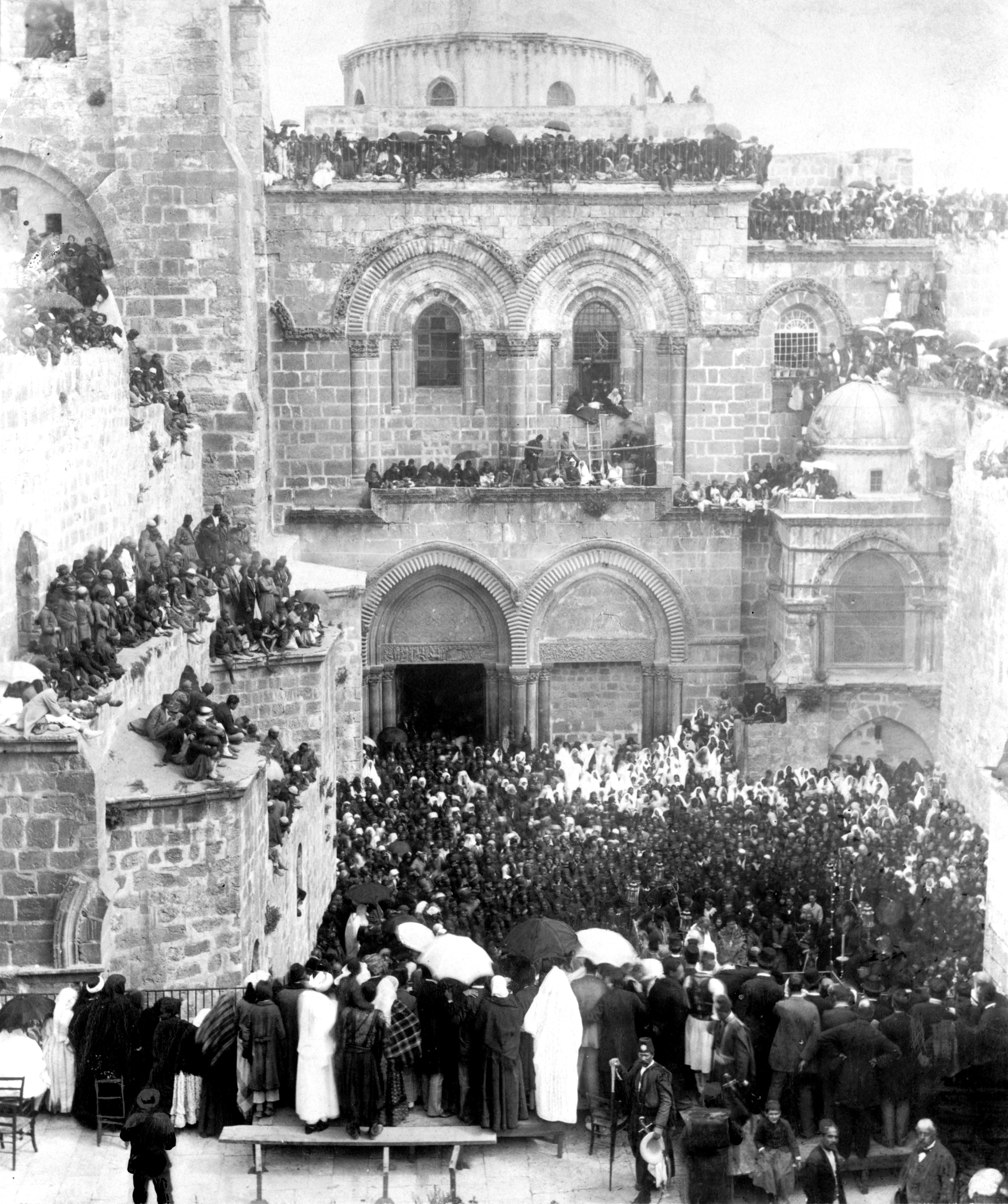
Religious festival, photograph, 1890.

One theory suggests that Armenian monks used the cornice and ladder to hoist water and provisions using a rope. This was done to avoid leaving the church and paying the entrance fee levied by the Ottoman authorities. On the left side of the entrance to the church, there was a sofa where Turkish guards were stationed. The entrance fee to the church (known as the kaffar) amounted to up to 500 piastres (5 Ottoman lire). To access the areas behind the windows of the second tier, one needed to pass through the territory belonging to the Greek Church, which could sometimes be impossible. The cornice served as a place for monks to catch a breath of fresh air, as some monks, to avoid paying the Turks for entry, did not leave the church for months, or even years.

Another theory suggests that monks used the cornice to grow greens and vegetables. In Charles William Wilson's engraving, pots with plants are depicted on the cornice next to the Immovable Ladder. Some sources mention that monks cultivated greens on the cornices.

There is a version that the ladder was used to access the cornice during religious festivals when a multitude of believers gathered in the churchyard. In the summary of the "Status Quo", intended for use by the Palestine Police Force in the British Mandate of Palestine, it is stated:

Above the doorway runs a classical cornice, a relic of the Byzantine buildings. This is reached from the windows of the Armenian Chapel of St. John, and this Community has the use thereof on the occasion of the festival ceremonies that take place in the Courtyard. The upper cornice is used in the same manner by the Orthodox. These two cornices are in a damaged condition and the whole facade is badly weather-beaten and requires expert attention.

According to various accounts, the ladder once belonged to a mason who was doing restoration work in the Church of the Holy Sepulchre. Jerome Murphy-O'Connor states that "the ladder was first introduced at a time when the Ottomans taxed Christian clergy every time they left and entered the Holy Sepulchre". The Catholics adapted by setting up quarters inside the church. O'Connor continues:

The window, ladder and ledge all belong to the Armenians. The ledge served as a balcony for the Armenian clergy resident in the Holy Sepulchre, and they reached it via the ladder. It was their only opportunity to get fresh air and sunshine. At one stage, apparently, they also grew fresh vegetables on the ledge. (Note: "... the ladder leads to a balcony where the Armenian superior used to drink coffee with his friends and tend his flower garden; it is there so that the balcony can be cleaned.")

=== 1757 Sultan's Firman and Status Quo ===
The earliest record of the ladder is in a 1728 engraving by Elzearius Horn. In 1757, the same year the Status Quo was introduced, Ottoman sultan Abdul Hamid I mentioned the ladder in a firman, and because everything was to be left "as it was" according to the royal decree, the ladder had to stay as it was too. An 1842 lithograph by David Roberts also shows the ladder in place. The earliest photograph showing the ladder dates from the 1850s. By the end of the 19th century, the ladder was being used to bring food to Armenian monks imprisoned by the Turks. Turkish accounts mention the ladder being used by Armenian monks to clean the windows above the ledge. The Byzantine cornice the ladder rests on has been used by the public during festivals.

In 1757, the Franciscans began constructing their altar in front of the Aedicula richly decorated with gifts received from various European countries. On Easter 1757, a crowd of Greeks, incited by Orthodox monks, stormed the church to prevent the construction of the altar. The Franciscans barricaded themselves in their cells. Greek hierarchs sent a report on this incident to Constantinople, accusing Catholics of "hidden hostility" towards the authorities of the Ottoman Empire.

Sultan Osman III, aiming to prevent unrest among the Orthodox population of the empire, issued a special decree, known as a firman, limiting the rights of Catholics to the sanctuaries in the Holy Land and transferred ownership of the Church of the Nativity and the Tomb of the Virgin Mary to the Greek Church. The firman also established equal rights for both denominations in the Church of the Holy Sepulchre. Some sources claim that the acceptance of the 1757 firman was influenced by Grand Vizier Koca Ragıp Pasha, who allegedly received a large bribe from the Greeks. When the French ambassador Comte de Vergennes attempted to protest the decision, Ragıp Pasha replied, "These places belong to the Sultan, and he gives them to whom he wishes; perhaps they have always been in the hands of the Franks, but today His Majesty wishes them to belong to the Greeks".

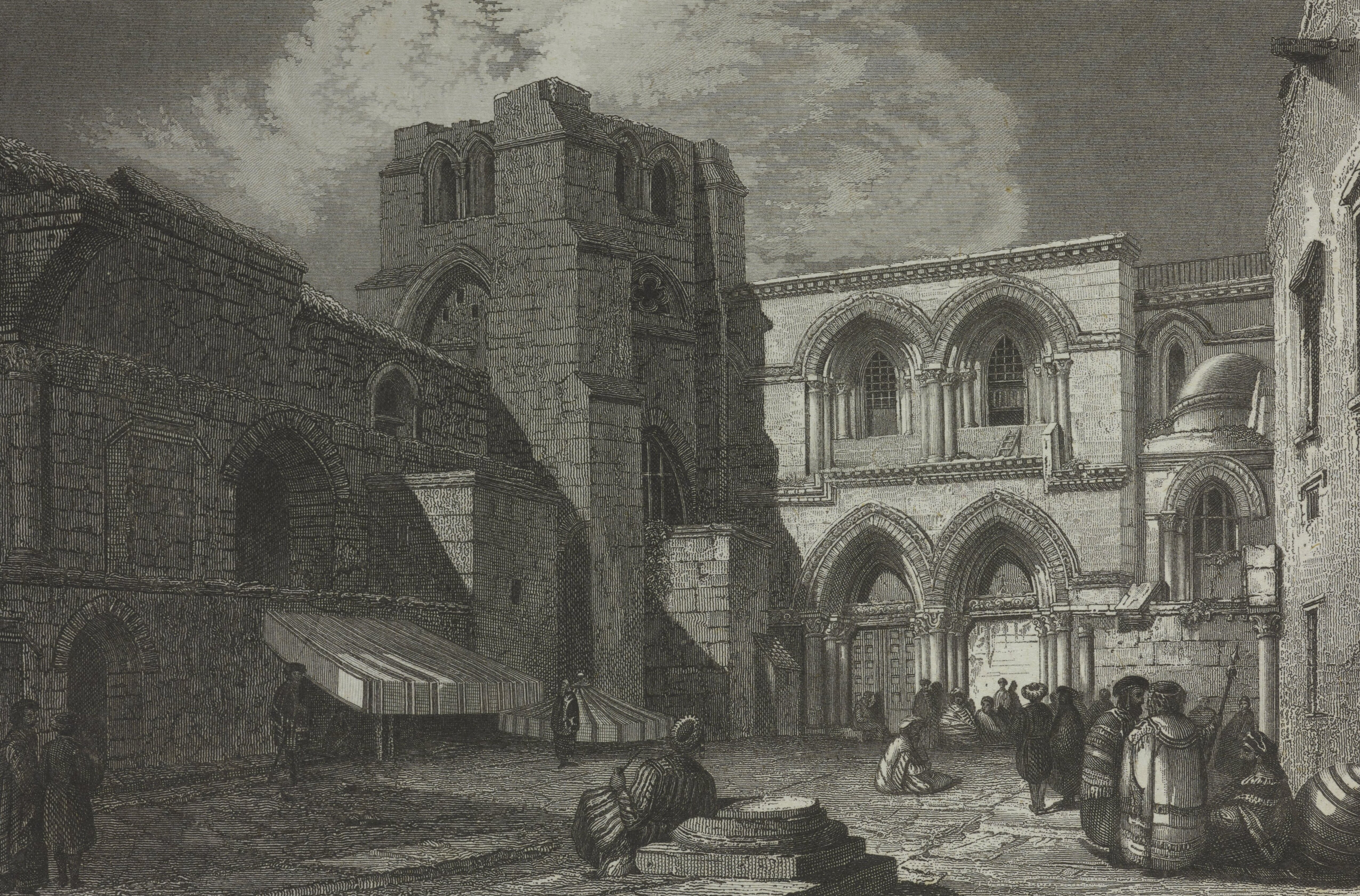
Engraving by Edward Finden, 1834

The 1757 firman served as the first documentary basis for establishing the peculiar rules for the division of Christian sanctuaries among several Christian denominations. The division of rights, established by the 1757 firman (Note: According to the Sultan's 1757 firman, Catholics and Orthodox were granted equal rights to the Church of the Holy Sepulchre, while the Church of the Nativity and the Tomb of the Virgin Mary were under the ownership of the Greek Orthodox Church.) and reaffirmed by a firman in 1852, (Note: In February 1852, the Sultan issued another firman regarding Christian holy sites, effectively confirming their status that had existed since 1757. At the same time, minor concessions were made to the Catholic Church: the silver star was returned to the Church of the Nativity in Bethlehem, and in Jerusalem, in a ceremonial manner, the keys to the Church of the Holy Sepulchre and the Church of the Nativity were handed over to the Catholic bishop.) became known as "Status quo". These are the only documents governing and functioning in the main Christian churches. The provisions of the Status Quo have been and are strictly adhered to by all authorities under whose jurisdiction these territories have been at various times—British authorities in the British Mandate of Palestine, Jordan, and Israel.

The Immovable Ladder is first mentioned in the 1757 firman of Sultan Abdul Hamid I and later in the 1852 edict of Sultan Abdul Mejid I.

=== Symbolism ===
The ladder has been invoked symbolically. The presence of the ladder in its place signifies the observance of an agreement between the six Christian denominations that own the church not to move, repair, or alter anything in the church without the consent of all six. During his pilgrimage to the Holy Land in 1964, Pope Paul VI described the ladder as a visible symbol of Christian division.

In 1997, a tourist allegedly hid the ladder inside the church to ridicule the Status Quo, before it was replaced.

== Gallery ==
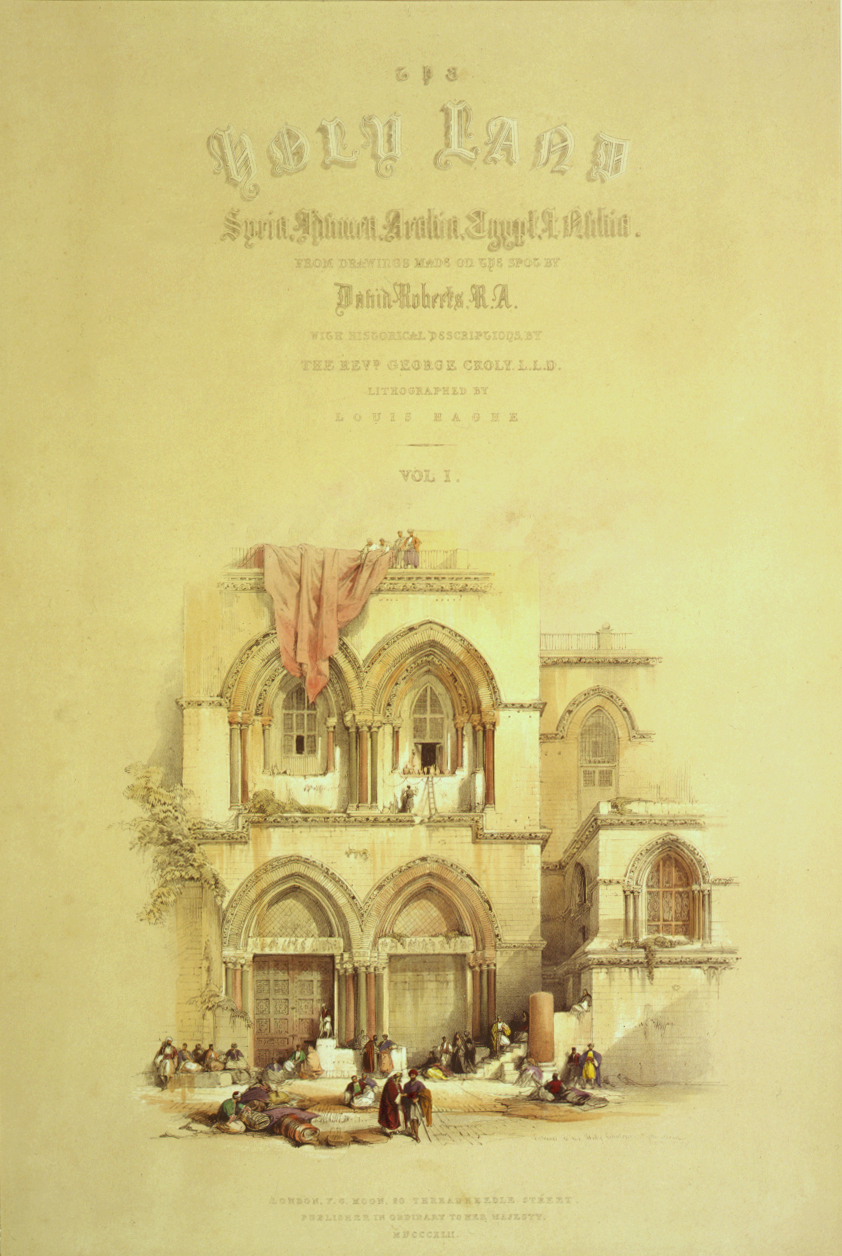
The ladder on the front page of the 1842–1849 The Holy Land, Syria, Idumea, Arabia, Egypt, and Nubia

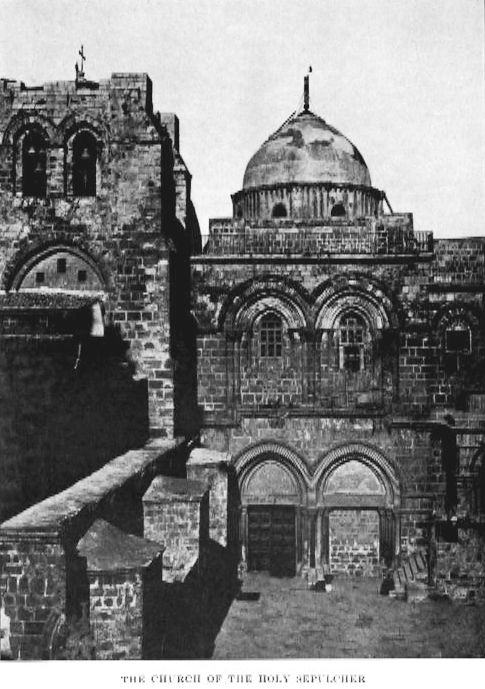
Church of the Holy Sepulchre in 1885. The immovable ladder is visible below the upper-right window. (A different ladder leans against the dome.)

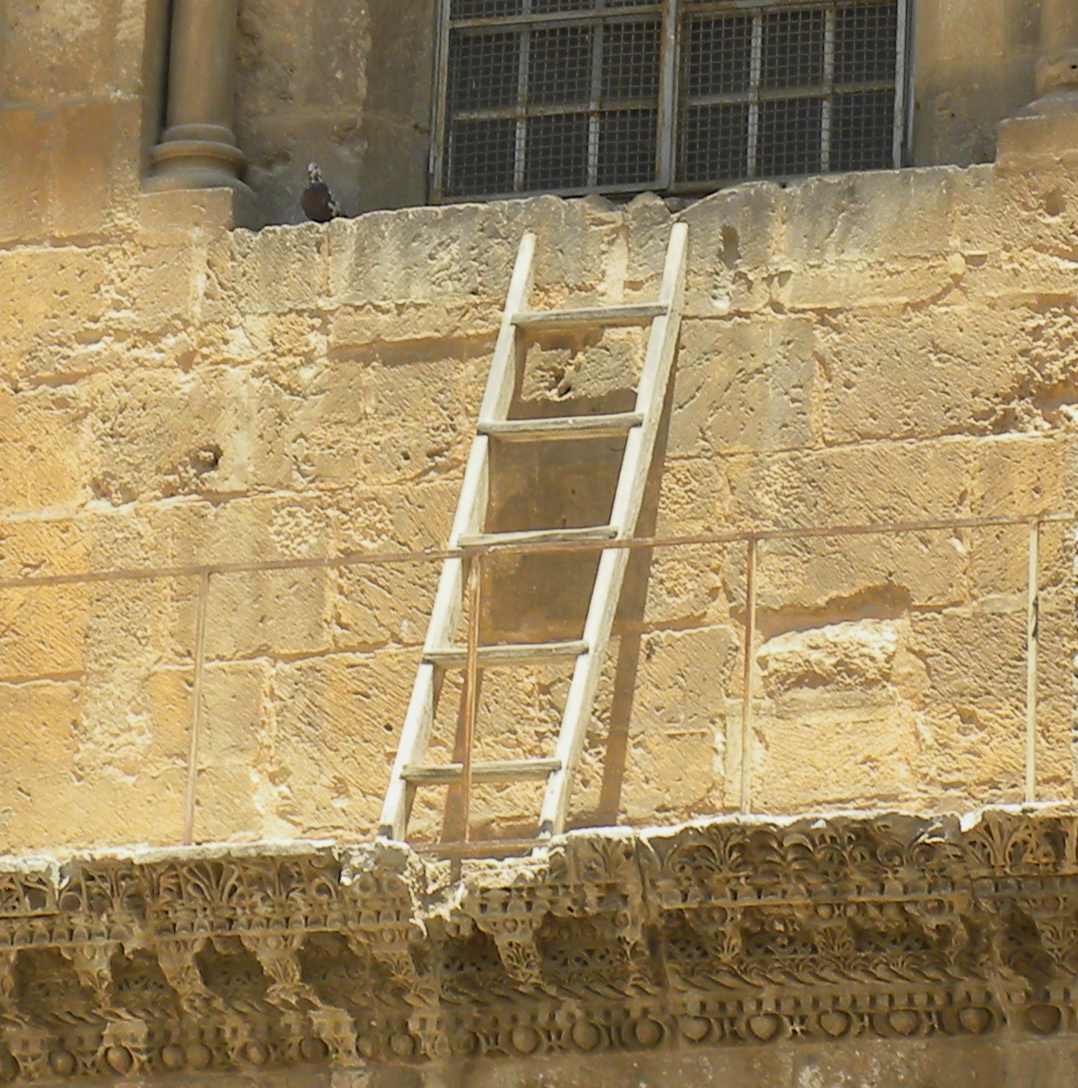
The immovable ladder, 2011

== See also ==
- Church of the Holy Sepulchre
