= Bernhard von Breidenbach =

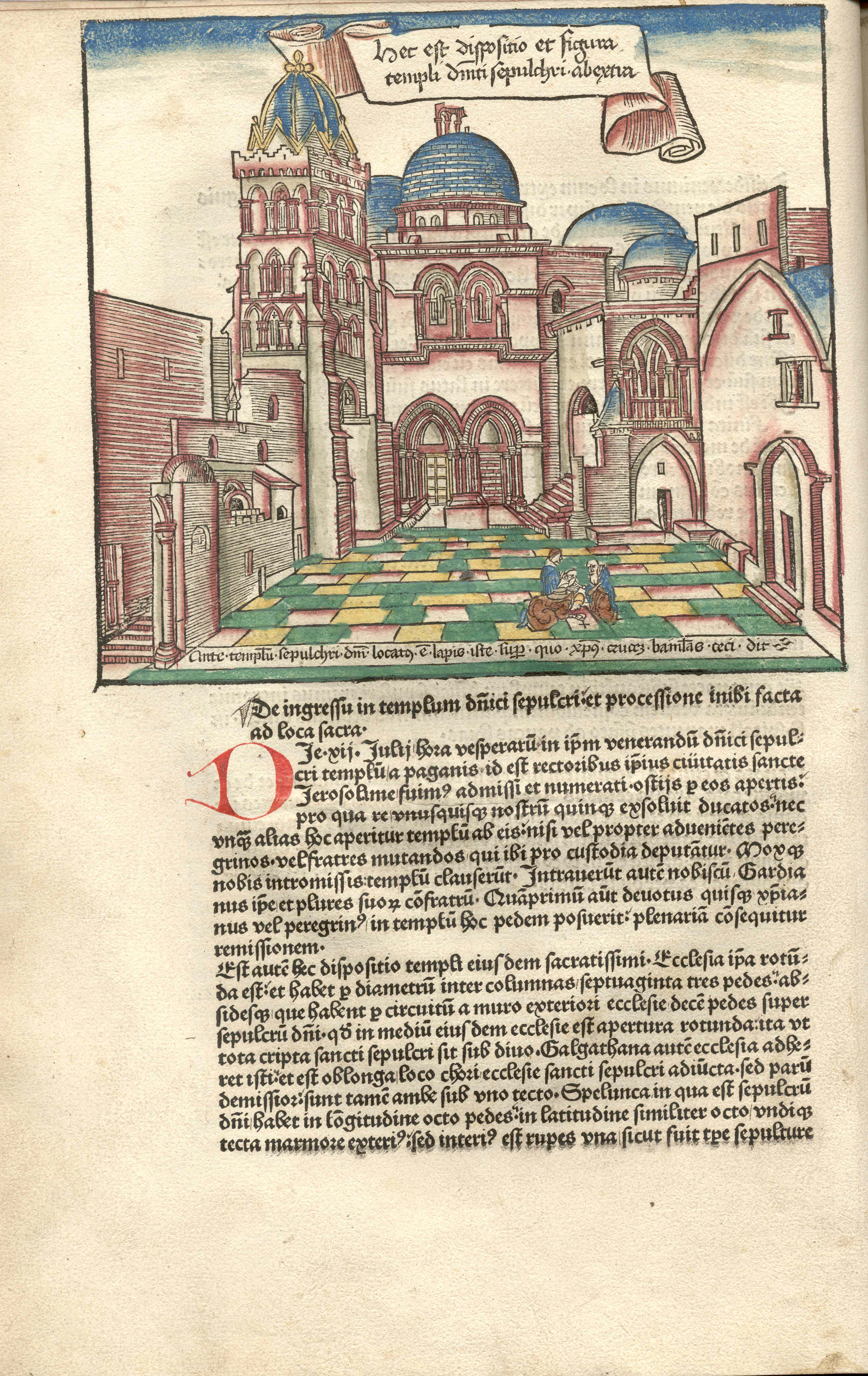
The Church of the Holy Sepulchre in Jerusalem from Peregrinatio in terram sanctam (1486) by Bernhard von Breidenbach.

Bernhard von Breidenbach (also Breydenbach) (ca. 1440 – 1497) was a politician in the Electorate of Mainz. He wrote a travel report, Peregrinatio in terram sanctam (1486), from his travels to the Holy Land.

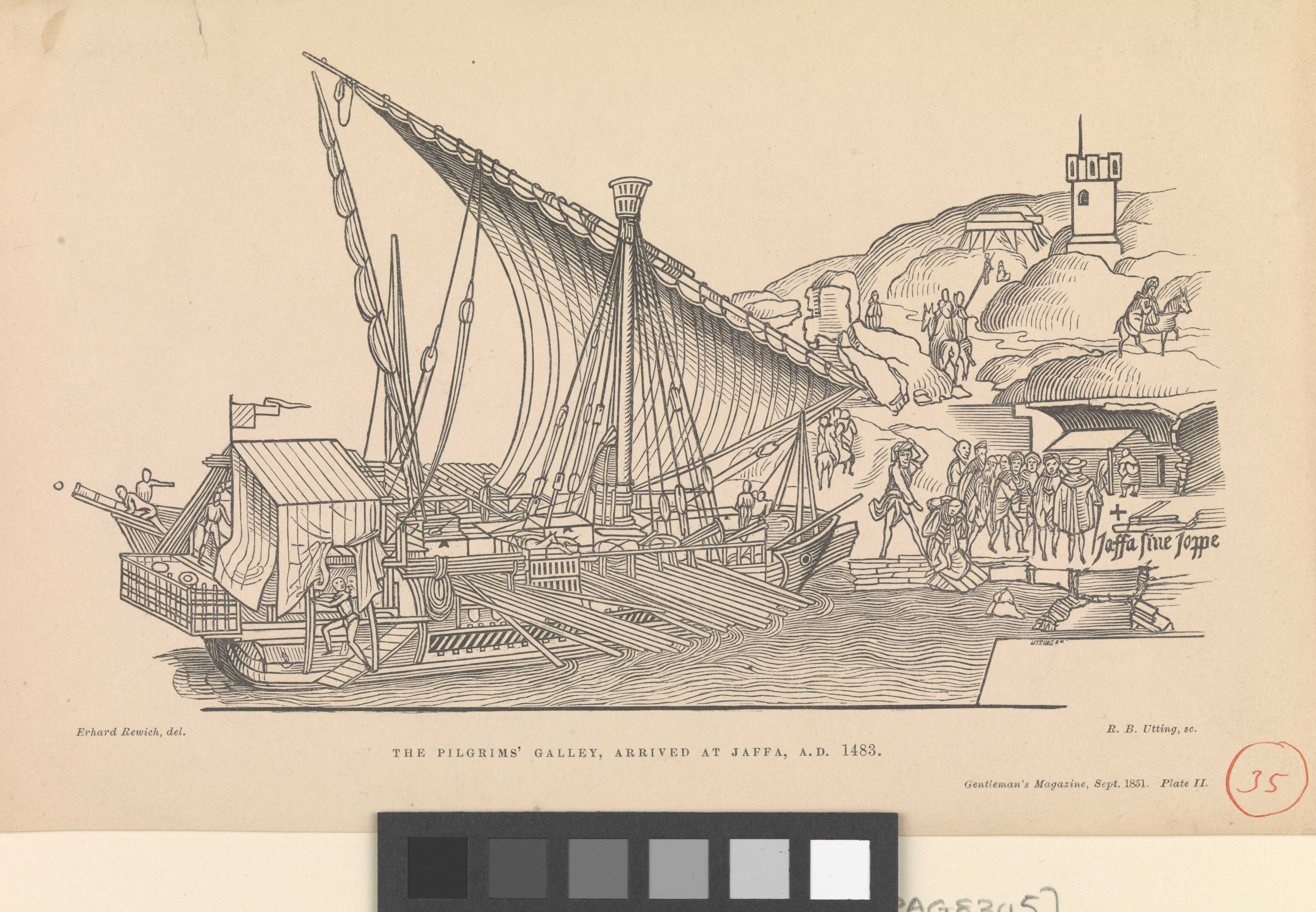
The Pilgrim's Galley, arrived at Jaffa, A.D. 1483 with Bernhard von Breidenbach

In Jerusalem, he met Felix Fabri.

== Works by Breydenbach ==
- Peregrinatio in terram sanctam, Latin edition, Mainz 1486. Digitized copy of the University and State Library Düsseldorf
- Bewehrtes Reisebuch deß heiligen Lands, oder, Eine gründliche Beschreibung aller Meer- und Bilgerfahrten zum heiligen Lande, so von vielen hohen, auch andern Stands Personen, zu Wasser und Land vorgenommen... Da auch weiters Die eigentliche Beschreibung deß gantzen heiligen Lands Palaestinae, sampt desselben Landschaften, German edition, Mainz 1486.
  - Andreas Klußmann (Hrsg.): Bernhard von Breydenbach: Peregrinatio in terram sanctam. Erste deutsche Ausgabe von Peter Schöffer, Mainz 1486. Facsimile, 159 sheets, with illustrations including the folded vedute, Saarbrücken 2008, ISBN 978-3-937246-00-0.
  - Isolde Mozer (Hrsg.): Bernhard von Breydenbach: Peregrinatio in terram sanctam. Eine Pilgerreise ins Heilige Land, Early New High German text and German translation, de Gruyter, Berlin 2010, ISBN 978-3-11-020951-8.

== Bibliography ==
- Davies, Hugh Wm., 1911, Bernhard von Breydenbach and his journey to the Holy Land 1483-4 : a bibliography
- Fabri, F. (1893). Felix Fabri (circa 1480–1483 A.D.) vol II, part I. Palestine Pilgrims' Text Society.
