= Jaffna (disambiguation) =

Jaffna most often refers to Jaffna city, the capital of the Northern Province, Sri Lanka.

Jaffna or Jafnah may also refer to:

== Relating to the city of Jaffna ==
- Jaffna Municipal Council, the local authority for the city of Jaffna
- Jaffna District, the northernmost district of the Northern Province, Sri Lanka
- Jaffna Electoral District, a multi-member electoral district of Sri Lanka
- Jaffna Electoral District (1947–1989), a former single-member electoral district of Sri Lanka
- Jaffna Peninsula, the geographic location of most of Jaffna District
- Jaffna kingdom, a kingdom in northern Sri Lanka 8th-16th century
- Jaffna Diocese (disambiguation), Roman Catholic diocese for Jaffna
- University of Jaffna
- Jaffna Hindu College, primary to high school
- Jaffna Youth Congress, which was the first of Sri Lanka's Youth Leagues
- Little Jaffna (disambiguation)
- The Jaffna (aircraft)
- Jaffna (film), working title of the 2013 Indian political thriller film Madras Cafe by Shoojit Sircar, which is set during the Sri Lankan Civil War
- Jaffna Kings, Frenchies cricket team in Sri Lanka

== People ==
- Jafnah ibn Amr, the eponymous ancestor of the Arab Ghassanids
- Jafnah (587–591), a late Ghassanid ruler during the reign of the Byzantine emperor Maurice

== See also ==
- Jaffa (disambiguation)
- Jaffna Tamil (disambiguation)
