= Paul the Black =

39th Patriarch of Syriac Orthodox Church of Antioch

Paul II the Black
- Syriac Orthodox Patriarch of Antioch and All the East
- Church: Syriac Orthodox Church
- See: Antioch
- Installed: c. 551 or 564
- Term ended: 578
- Predecessor: Sergius of Tella
- Successor: Peter III of Callinicum

Personal details
- Born: c. 500 Alexandria, Eastern Roman Empire
- Died: 581/584 Constantinople, Eastern Roman Empire

Paul II the Black (Greek: Paulos Melanos, Syriac: ܦܘܠܘܣ ܬܪܝܢܐ ܦܛܪܝܪܟܐ ܕܐܢܛܝܘܟܝܐ), also known as Paul of Bēth Ukkāme, was the Patriarch of Antioch and head of the Syriac Orthodox Church from c. 551 or 564 to his deposition in 578. He succeeded Sergius of Tella as the spiritual leader of the Syrian non-Chalcedonians, in opposition to the Chalcedonian Imperial Church, and led the nascent Syriac Orthodox Church as it endured division and persecution.

In Paul's tenure as patriarch, the Church suffered schisms, first with the tritheists, then with the Egyptian non-Chalcedonians after a failed attempt to consecrate a new pope of Alexandria, and finally with the eminent bishop Jacob Baradaeus, who in his effort to reunite the Egyptian and Syrian non-Chalcedonians agreed to Paul's deposition, dividing the Church in the process. Amidst the troubles he faced, Paul was imprisoned, excommunicated twice, forced into exile in Arabia twice, and ultimately forced into hiding at Constantinople, where he died, and received an ignominious burial.

== Biography ==
=== Early life ===
Paul was born at Alexandria in Egypt in c. 500 to the family of Ukkame. (Note: The sobriquet 'the black' (Greek: Melanos) is a translation of Paul's family name. It is alternatively transliterated as Ukama, Ukomo, Ukome, or Ukkame.) He became a monk at the Monastery of Gubo Baroyo in Syria, where he studied Greek and Syriac literature. Paul was appointed archimandrite of a monastery at Alexandria, and later became the syncellus (secretary) of the non-Chalcedonian Pope Theodosius I of Alexandria at Constantinople. The Syrian non-Chalcedonians had lacked a patriarch of Antioch for several years since the death of Sergius of Tella, and thus Theodosius sent Paul to Syria to discuss the situation with the non-Chalcedonian bishops there. Unbeknownst to Paul, Theodosius also sent two letters to the Syrian non-Chalcedonian bishops to request that they ordain Paul as Sergius' successor as patriarch.

Paul was consecrated as the patriarch of Antioch by the bishops Jacob Baradaeus of Edessa, Eugenius of Seleucia, and Eunomius of Amida, and was witnessed by the bishops Conon of Tarsus, John of Chalcis, and John of Seleucia in Syria. According to the Zuqnin Chronicle, Paul was consecrated as patriarch in c. 551, whereas John of Ephesus in his Ecclesiastical History places the consecration in 564. Paul received acknowledgement of his consecration from the bishops Sergius of Harran, John of Sura, and Theodore of Arabia. After Jacob Baradaeus had canvassed the non-Chalcedonian monasteries to recognise Paul as patriarch, he was accepted by the monastery of Beth Aphthonia, and the archimandrites Eusebius of Mar Bassus, Zenobius of Mar Bizi, Andreas of Mar Manassis, Phocas of Mar Eusebius, John of Mar Romanus, and Barhabshabba of the Great Monastery of Tel‛eda. Theodosius and Paul exchanged letters to confirm their two churches were in communion, and declare their recognition of one another as legitimate patriarchs.

=== Patriarch of Antioch ===
In 565, at Theodosius' request, Paul travelled to Egypt, with John of Kellia, Leonidas, and Joseph of Metellis, to perform ordinations and manage other ecclesiastical matters in his stead. However, he did not consecrate any bishops in Egypt, and Theodosius died in June 566. Paul aimed to succeed Theodosius as the non-Chalcedonian pope of Alexandria, and slandered Athanasius, the grandson of the Empress Theodora, who was a candidate to become pope as he was popular with the Egyptian non-Chalcedonians. The Egyptian non-Chalcedonians assembled a dossier of complaints against Paul for Athanasius, which was then provided to Emperor Justin II, and Paul consequently abandoned his plans to become pope and left Egypt. Paul took refuge at the encampment of the non-Chalcedonian Ghassanid King Al-Harith ibn Jabalah in Arabia before returning to Constantinople.

The tritheist controversy surfaced amongst the non-Chalcedonians in 567, and the situation deteriorated until the tritheist advocates Conon of Tarsus and Eugenius of Seleucia were deposed and excommunicated in 569. Paul came under criticism for his opposition to tritheism, and its proponents claimed he was opposed by Jacob Baradaeus and Theodore of Arabia, to which they responded by formally reaffirming their support for him. In 570, the tritheists appealed to Emperor Justin, and he arranged for a disputation to be held under the auspices of the Chalcedonian Patriarch John Scholasticus of Constantinople. For four days, Conon and Eugenius debated with Paul and Stephen of Cyprus; both Michael the Syrian and Bar Hebraeus erroneously name John of Ephesus as Paul's companion in the disputation. The disputation came to nothing, and the two factions remained in schism.

Emperor Justin issued an henoticon (edict of union) in 571 in an effort to end the schism between the Chalcedonian Imperial Church and the non-Chalcedonian Syriac Orthodox Church, but was rejected by most non-Chalcedonians, and he ordered their persecution on 21 March. John Scholasticus invited Paul, who was residing at the monastery of the Acoemetae in Constantinople, and the bishops John of Ephesus, Stephen of Cyprus, and Elijah, to the patriarchal palace to discuss ending the schism, but upon their arrival there they were detained until they had agreed to subscribe to the Emperor Justin's edict, thus entering into communion with the Imperial Church. The group recanted their communion and were confined to the Monastery of Saint Abraham at Constantinople, where they again agreed to accept the henoticon.

Paul was excommunicated by Jacob Baradaeus for accepting communion with the Imperial Church, and he remained in captivity until he managed to escape in 574, and fled to the encampment of the Ghassanid King Al-Mundhir III ibn al-Harith, and then to the Mareotis region in Egypt disguised as a soldier. In the following year, Paul issued a libellus to declare his penance and Jacob Baradaeus absolved him at Al-Mundhir's request.

=== Alexandrine schism ===
After Pope Theodosius' death in 566, the Egyptian non-Chalcedonians lacked a spiritual leader, and between 23 June and 25 August 575 the bishops Longinus of Nubia, John of Chalcis, and George Urtaya consecrated Theodore of Rhamnis, archimandrite of a monastery in the Scetis, as pope of Alexandria with Paul's support. Although Theodore's consecration had taken place at the request of the Egyptian archpriest Theodosius and archdeacon Theodore Copris, and had the support of the bishops Theodore of Philae and John of Kellia, he was violently rejected by a number of Egyptian non-Chalcedonians who resented that they had not been consulted. Theodore of Philae and John of Kellia both renounced their support for Theodore, and the latter sided with his opponents, and only six weeks after Theodore's consecration, John consecrated the deacon Peter as pope of Alexandria.

As Paul had formally recognised Theodore as the legitimate pope of Alexandria, Peter excommunicated Paul and declared to have deposed him as patriarch of Antioch. Theodore made no effort to establish himself as pope of Alexandria and retired to his monastery, and Peter was accepted by the majority of the Egyptian non-Chalcedonians. Jacob Baradaeus initially supported Paul, but after travelling to Egypt in 576 it was agreed that he would acknowledge Peter as pope of Alexandria and his deposition of Paul on the condition that Paul was not excommunicated. This further disrupted the church as the Syrian non-Chalcedonians were thus divided between Jacobites, who supported Jacob Baradaeus' decision to uphold Paul's deposition, and Paulites, who supported Paul as patriarch of Antioch. Paul and Al-Mundhir appealed to Jacob to hold a synod to bring about an end to the schism between their two factions, but he refused.

In 577, the faction in favour of Theodore's papacy collapsed as Longinus went into exile in Arabia, whilst Paul went into hiding at Constantinople. Discussions were held amongst Syrian non-Chalcedonians on the matter of the appointment of a new patriarch of Antioch to replace Paul, and Jacob Baradaeus travelled to Egypt to discuss the schism with Peter's successor Pope Damian of Alexandria but died en route on 30 July 578. Damian spearheaded the opposition to Paul, and in 579, with the support of some of the Syrian non-Chalcedonians, he planned to consecrate a certain Severus as patriarch at the Cassian Church in Antioch with two other bishops, but the Chalcedonian Patriarch Gregory of Antioch discovered Damian's plot and had their residence in Antioch stormed before the consecration took place and the group was forced to flee the city through the sewers.

=== Later life ===
A synod at Constantinople was held by Al-Mundhir in March 580 to heal the division between the Jacobites and Paulites, and at its conclusion, Damian agreed to end the schism with Paul. However, upon Damian's return to Alexandria, he rescinded his reconciliation with Paul under pressure from his followers, and issued an encyclical to the Syrian non-Chalcedonians to condemn Paul. Damian eventually succeeded in consecrating Peter of Callinicum as patriarch of Antioch in 581, and Paul either died soon after in the same year, or after several years in 584. He was unceremoniously buried at his monastery at night with a false name and no funeral.

== Bibliography ==
Primary sources

- Bar Hebraeus. Ecclesiastical History. Translated by Marianna Mazzola. PSL Research University.
- John of Ephesus. Ecclesiastical History. Translated by Robert Payne Smith. Oxford University Press.

Secondary sources

- Adams, William Y. (1991). "Longinus". In Aziz Suryal Atiya (ed.). The Coptic Encyclopedia. Vol. 5. New York: Macmillan Publishers. cols. 1479b-1480b.
- Allen, Pauline (2011). "Episcopal Succession in Antioch in the Sixth Century". In Johan Leemans; Peter Van Nuffelen; Shawn W. J. Keough; Carla Nicolaye (eds.). Episcopal Elections in Late Antiquity. Walter de Gruyter GmbH. pp. 23–39.
- Allen, Pauline; Neil, Bronwen (2013). Crisis Management in Late Antiquity (410–590 CE): A Survey of the Evidence from Episcopal Letters. Brill.
- Barsoum, Ephrem (2003). The Scattered Pearls: A History of Syriac Literature and Sciences. Translated by Matti Moosa (2nd ed.). Gorgias Press.
- Grillmeier, Aloys; Hainthaler, Theresia (1996). Christ in Christian Tradition: Volume 2 Part 4: The Churches of Jerusalem and Antioch. Translated by O.C. Dean, Jr. Mowbray.
- Grillmeier, Aloys; Hainthaler, Theresia (2013). Christ in Christian Tradition: Volume 2 Part 3: The Churches of Jerusalem and Antioch. Translated by Marianne Ehrhardt. Oxford University Press.
- Haldon, John F (1997). Byzantium in the Seventh Century: The Transformation of a Culture. Cambridge University Press.
- Hardy, E.R. (1991). "Peter IV". In Aziz Suryal Atiya (ed.). The Coptic Encyclopedia. Vol. 6. New York: Macmillan Publishers. cols. 1948a-1948b.
- Markschies, Christoph (2011). "Paul Melanos". In Hans Dieter Betz; Don S. Browning; Bernd Janowski; Eberhard Jüngel (eds.). Religion Past and Present. Brill.
- Van Roey, Albert; Allen, Pauline (1994). Monophysite Texts of the Sixth Century. Peeters Publishers.
- Van Rompay, Lucas (2011). "Pawlos of Beth Ukome". In Sebastian P. Brock; Aaron M. Butts; George A. Kiraz; Lucas Van Rompay (eds.). Gorgias Encyclopedic Dictionary of the Syriac Heritage: Electronic Edition.
- Wilmshurst, David (2019). "West Syrian patriarchs and maphrians". In Daniel King (ed.). The Syriac World. Routledge. pp. 806–813.

Preceded by Sergius of Tella	Syriac Orthodox Patriarch of Antioch c. 551/564—578	Succeeded by Peter III of Callinicum
