= Sergius of Tella =

38th Patriarch of Syriac Orthodox Church of Antioch

- Syriac Orthodox Patriarch of Antioch
- Church: Syriac Orthodox Church
- See: Antioch
- Installed: c. 544 or c. 557
- Term ended: c. 547 or 560
- Predecessor: Severus of Antioch
- Successor: Paul II of Antioch

Personal details
- Born: Tella, Eastern Roman Empire
- Died: c. 547 or c. 560 Constantinople, Eastern Roman Empire

Sergius of Tella was the Syriac Orthodox Patriarch of Antioch and head of the Syriac Orthodox Church from c. 544 to c. 547 or c. 557 to 560.

== Early life ==
Sergius was born at Tella and was a friend of Jacob Baradaeus. He became a monk at the monastery of Hala and was ordained a priest by the bishop John of Anazarbus. As a monk, Sergius accepted the doctrine of tritheism, and accompanied Jacob Baradaeus to Constantinople in 527. At Constantinople, Sergius tutored Empress Theodora's grandson Athanasius, and became a friend of John Philoponus, who wrote a non-Chalcedonian treatise named "A Treatise Concerning the Whole and the Parts" at Sergius' request.

== Patriarch of Antioch ==
Jacob Baradaeus, who had become Bishop of Edessa, consecrated Sergius as patriarch of Antioch at Constantinople, thus cementing the schism in the church of Antioch into the non-Chalcedonian Syriac Church and Chalcedonian Greek Orthodox Church of Antioch. Sources disagree on the date of Sergius' consecration as patriarch. According to the Zuqnin Chronicle, he was consecrated in 544, whereas John of Ephesus in his Ecclesiastical History dates the consecration to 557. Sergius resided at Constantinople for the duration of his term as patriarch, for which he was later erroneously termed patriarch of Constantinople by the 14th-century historian Nikephoros Kallistos Xanthopoulos in his Ecclesiastical History. He died a natural death, either in 547 as per the Zuqnin Chronicle, or in 560 as per John of Ephesus.

== Bibliography ==
- Allen, Pauline (2011). "Episcopal Succession in Antioch in the Sixth Century". In Johan Leemans; Peter Van Nuffelen; Shawn W. J. Keough; Carla Nicolaye (eds.). Episcopal Elections in Late Antiquity. Walter de Gruyter. pp. 23–39.
- Lang, Uwe Michael (2001). John Philoponus and the Controversies Over Chalcedon in the Sixth Century - A Study and Translation of the Arbiter. Peeters Publishers.
- Mazzola, Marianna, ed. (2018). Bar 'Ebroyo's Ecclesiastical History - writing Church History in the 13th century Middle East. PSL Research University.
- Melton, J. Gordon (2014). Faiths Across Time - 5000 Years of Religious History. ABC-CLIO. ISBN 9781610690256.
- Wilmshurst, David (2019). "West Syrian patriarchs and maphrians". In Daniel King (ed.). The Syriac World. Routledge. pp. 806–813.
- Young, Robin Darling (1998). "Jacob Baradaeus". In Everett Ferguson; Michael P. McHugh; Frederick W. Norris (eds.). Encyclopedia of Early Christianity (2nd ed.). Taylor & Francis. p. 601.

| Preceded by Severus | Syriac Orthodox Patriarch of Antioch c. 544–c. 547 or c. 557–560 | Succeeded by Paul II |
