= Tha'laba ibn Amr =

Ghassanid ally of Rome

- King of the Ghassanids
- Reign: 270–287 CE
- Predecessor: Amr ibn Jafnah
- Successor: al-Harith ibn Tha'laba
- Died: c. 287 CE
- House: Ghassanids
- Religion: Christianity

Tha'laba ibn 'Amr (Arabic: ثعلبة بن عمرو) was the third of the Ghassanid rulers, succeeding his father Amr ibn Jafnah around 270 CE. Unlike his predecessor, Tha'laba was an ally of the Roman Empire. He was also the first of the Ghassanids to be recognized as an independent ruler.

== Biography ==
=== Family ===
Tha'laba was the son of Amr ibn Jafnah. Hence his lineage can be stated as Tha'laba ibn 'Amr ibn Jafnah ibn 'Amr Muzayqiya ibn 'Amir Ma' as-Sama ibn Haritha ibn Imru' al-Qays ibn Tha'laba ibn Mazin ibn 'Azd, and from there it shows that he is descended from the Kahlan king, Muzayqiya, as well as the Azd tribal group. Tha'laba had a son named al-Harith who succeeded him in ruling.

=== Rule ===
Tha'laba was the first Ghassanid ruler to have his independent authority as a ruler recognized by external powers. His reign lasting for almost 20 years, Tha'laba also built monumental constructions in the deserts near Balqa. The rule of Tha'laba is traditionally dated to circa 270–287 CE.

== Ally of Rome ==
Before the rule of Tha'laba, king Amr ibn Jafnah had already signed a treaty with the Roman Empire to ensure peace amongst themselves. Tha'laba himself was an open supporter of the Romans, declaring himself to be an ally of them. He assisted the Romans in fighting off the Sasanian Empire, whose armies were constantly raiding Roman territory. The scholar Safiur Rahman Mubarakpuri states that the Arab Lakhmids were formed by the Sasanian ruler Ardashir I (or his son, Shapur I) as a Persian form of resistance against the Romans and their Arab allies.

== See also ==
- Ghassanids
