= Jafnah (587–591) =

Sixth century Ghassanid phylarch

Jafnah (or Jafna) also called Abu Jafnah, was a king and phylarch of the Ghassanids, a major Arab tribal confederation allied to the Byzantine Empire, around the time of 587 to 591 AD, although the exact dates are uncertain. He originated from Manbij and ruled the Ghassanids in the reign of the Byzantine emperor Maurice (r. 582–602), who was responsible for a dissolution of the Ghassanid confederation upon his accession to the throne, followed by a restoration two or three years later upon realization that the Ghassanids were essential to the Byzantines for defending the Oriens. During the dissolution period, Jafnah may have temporarily defected to the Persians, before returning to the side of the Byzantines after the restoration. After the alliance was re-established, Jafnah participated in battles against the Persians in service of Byzantium, being dispatched far-away to Euphratensis, near the Persian border. Jafnah also mediated communications between the Byzantine and Sasanian emperors, delivering letters between the two.

Like his predecessors Arethas and Mundhir, Jafnah was prestigious for the role he played in presiding over church councils. He was a participant in the disputes regarding the Tritheist heresy in the late sixth century. A disagreement emerged between two Monophysite hierarchs, Damian of Alexandria and Peter of Callinicum, after Damian moved toward accepting certain Tritheist positions in an effort to facilitate reconciliation.

Jafnah arranged a meeting between the two patriarchs at a monastery, likely located in Arabia Petraea or near Damascus. However, the meetings were contentious, and Jafnah was unable to broker a formal agreement between the parties. As a result, the Syrian and Egyptian communities remained estranged for nearly thirty more years, until a final reconciliation was achieved by the patriarchs Athanasius I Gammolo and Anastasius of Alexandria in 616 AD.
