= Peter III of Callinicum =

40th Patriarch of Syriac Orthodox Church of Antioch

- Syriac Orthodox Patriarch of Antioch and All the East
- Church: Syriac Orthodox Church
- See: Antioch
- Installed: 581
- Term ended: 591
- Predecessor: Paul II
- Successor: Julian II

Personal details
- Born: c. 550 Callinicum, Eastern Roman Empire
- Died: 22 April 591

Sainthood
- Feast day: 22 April
- Venerated in: Syriac Orthodox Church

Peter III of Callinicum (Latin: Petrus Callinicus, Syriac: ܦܛܪܘܣ ܏ܓ ܩܠܘܢܝܩܝܐ) was the Patriarch of Antioch and head of the Syriac Orthodox Church from 581 until his death in 591. He is commemorated as a saint by the Syriac Orthodox Church in the Martyrology of Rabban Sliba, and his feast day is 22 April.

Under considerable pressure from the most prominent non-Chalcedonians, Peter agreed to become patriarch of Antioch, and thus spiritual leader of the Syrian non-Chalcedonians, in opposition to its incumbent Paul the Black, and led the church as he faced the division he inherited from Paul's tenure as patriarch. Whilst he had some success in dealing with the tritheists, Peter quarrelled with his erstwhile ally the Egyptian non-Chalcedonian Pope Damian of Alexandria, and entered into a schism with him that would persist past his death until 616.

== Biography ==
=== Early life ===
Peter was born at Callinicum in c. 550, and was the son of an orator named Paul. He was educated in Greek, Syriac, philosophy, and theology, and likely became a monk at the monastery of Saint Ananias near Callinicum. The 570s was a tumultuous period for the Syrian non-Chalcedonian community as its spiritual leader and patriarch of Antioch Paul the Black was declared deposed by the Egyptian non-Chalcedonian Pope Damian of Alexandria and eminent bishop Jacob Baradaeus, thus creating a schism between the Paulites, who supported Paul as patriarch, and Jacobites, who supported the deposition of Paul.

Paul's opponents conspired to consecrate a new patriarch of Antioch in his stead, and Jacob Baradaeus twice offered to appoint Peter as Paul's successor, but he refused on both occasions as he was reluctant to assume the office whilst Paul was still alive. Damian travelled to Syria in 579 after Jacob Baradaeus' death to arrange for the election of a new patriarch, and again Peter was asked to become patriarch, but he refused once more. Finally, after Damian had unsuccessfully attempted to consecrate a certain Severus as patriarch, and a meeting between the Paulites and Jacobites at Constantinople in 580 had failed to reunite the factions, Peter relented and agreed to become patriarch of Antioch on Damian's request.

The sources differ on the date, location, and bishop responsible for Peter's consecration. The Chronicle of 1234 places Peter's consecration in 570/571 (AG 882), the Zuqnin Chronicle gives 578 (AG 889), and John of Ephesus in his Ecclesiastical History records 581 (AG 892). The Chronicle of 846 also supports 580/581 (AG 892) as the year of Peter's consecration. The earliest date 570/571 is disregarded as an erroneous copy of 581, and 578, although previously accepted by earlier Syriac historians, including William Wright, Rubens Duval, Carl Anton Baumstark, Jean-Baptiste Chabot, and Ortiz de Urbina, has since been rejected in favour of 581.

John of Ephesus reported that Peter was consecrated patriarch of Antioch by Damian at Alexandria, and is supported by the Chronicle of 1234, whereas the historians Michael the Syrian and Bar Hebraeus record that Peter was consecrated at the aforementioned monastery of Saint Ananias by the archbishop Joseph of Amid with the support of the Egyptian non-Chalcedonians. It is also suggested that he was consecrated at the monastery of Gubo Baroyo near Cyrrhus. After his consecration, Peter sent a letter to Damian to confirm their churches were in communion, and included a refutation of tritheism. Damian responded with a letter to Peter to give his official endorsement, and enthusiastically praised the new patriarch of Antioch.

=== Patriarch of Antioch ===
Upon his ascension to the patriarchal office, Peter became remorseful that he had agreed to become patriarch whilst its previous incumbent still lived, travelled to Alexandria with the theologians Probus and archimandrite John Barbour, and offered his resignation to Damian in an effort to reunite the Paulites and Jacobites. Damian refused Peter's offer, and Paul may have died soon after, thus bringing an end to the split between the two factions, however, it is alternatively asserted that Paul instead died in 584, suggesting the schism endured for several more years. Peter returned to Syria, whereas his companions Probus and John Barbour decided to remain at Alexandria as they had become disgruntled with Peter for not consecrating them as bishops.

In 582, Peter met with the Cilician tritheist bishops Antoninus and Elias and archimandrite Theodore to discuss their reunion with the Syrian non-Chalcedonians under Peter, and he asserted that he would only assent to this if they renounced tritheism and its proponents, namely John Philoponus, and accepted the denunciation of tritheism as expressed in the aforementioned synodal letters of Peter and Damian, and the treatise of Pope Theodosius I of Alexandria. To Theodore's surprise, Antoninus renounced tritheism, and was supported by Elias, but neither of the two bishops broke off from the tritheist faction.

After several years, the tritheists Elias and Theodore met with Peter on behalf of Conon of Tarsus and Antoninus to again discuss the patriarch's demands for their reunion. At the meeting's conclusion, Elias and Theodore accepted Peter's main conditions, and it was agreed they would write to the other tritheists at Constantinople to consult them before a union was formalised. A few days later, Peter received the delegation's reply and a letter from Elias declaring an end to talks of union as Conon and Antoninus refused to condemn proponents of tritheism. Theodore concurred with Conon and Antoninus, but Elias separated from the tritheist faction at this point and met with Peter. Elias underwent penance for a short period of time, presented Peter with a plerophoria (confession of faith) in accordance with his conditions on 21 July 585, and entered into communion with him.

At Alexandria, Probus and John Barbour had been swayed to Neo-Chalcedonism by Stephanus of Alexandria, and the former's open support for this christological position had led Damian to expel him from the city, and he travelled to Syria to continue his campaign in support of the position against non-Chalcedonianism. Probus was consequently excommunicated, and after an appeal from John Barbour, who had concealed his support for neo-Chalcedonism, Peter convened a synod at the monastery of Gubo Baroyo in c. 585 to hear an apologia by John Barbour that he had composed in defence of Probus. The synod concluded that John had also adopted neo-Chalcedonism, and he was duly deposed and excommunicated, and Peter issued a synodal letter to condemn and refute their christological position.

=== Alexandrine schism ===
In c. 586, the formerly cordial relationship between Peter and Damian was soured by theological controversy, and ultimately led to schism between their two churches that would endure until its resolution in 616. However, the origins of this quarrel is obscured by the partisanship of the available sources. The Egyptian sources, the History of the Patriarchs of Alexandria and Synaxaire Arabe-Jacobite, support Damian, and subsequently attest that the dispute had begun with Peter's synodal letter to Damian, in which he had allegedly declared it was unnecessary to speak of the Trinity, thereby constituting an accusation of the heresy of sabellianism, but had also supported the division of the Trinity, thus suggesting he supported tritheism, which was theologically opposed to sabellianism. It is claimed that Peter had ignored a treatise from Damian that had informed him of his errors.

On the other hand, the Syrian sources, including Peter's letters and the histories of Michael the Syrian and Bar Hebraeus, favour Peter, and record the dispute had begun after Damian had written an anti-tritheist book in response to a tritheist tract, and sent it to Peter to be examined and correct any errors. Peter's reply to Damian gave praise of his refutation of tritheism, but also noted that he may have deviated from the doctrine that had been established by the Cappadocian Fathers, Cyril of Alexandria, Severus of Antioch, and Pope Theodosius I of Alexandria, and asked that he clarified several points. Damian resented Peter's request, and claimed that he had rejected his work out of envy, thus prompting Peter to assemble a synod, which compiled and conveyed a text to Damian to reply to his claims. This was to no avail, however, as Damian issued festal letters and apologia to defend his book, and continued to criticise Peter.

Peter issued a letter addressed to the Church of Alexandria to encourage its members to prevail upon Damian to resolve the dispute. According to Michael the Syrian, after Peter had invited him to meet to discuss their disagreement several times, Damian reluctantly agreed to meet at Paralos in Egypt to make arrangements for a formal debate between the two. However, Peter, in his letter to the monastery of the Antonines at the Enaton in Egypt, instead relayed that he had travelled to Egypt with his entourage without any prior agreement with Damian, and had planned to travel to Alexandria, but had been prevented from entering the city and made to stay at Paralos, only three days march from the city. Both Michael the Syrian's history and Peter's letter suggest that, although he did not meet with Damian at Paralos, he did receive a number of letters from him whilst he was there.

Peter's letter to the Antonines attests that after staying at Paralos for four months, during which time he was poorly treated, Peter and his companions were expelled from Egypt with no agreement on a meeting between him and Damian, whereas Michael the Syrian's history suggests a second meeting was arranged to be held in the province of Arabia. The letter from Peter to the Syrians at Alexandria clarifies that a meeting in Arabia was agreed upon once Damian had travelled to Tyre in secret, and sent representatives to Peter at his residence at the monastery of Gubo Baroyo. As a region with a strong non-Chalcedonian presence, and the residence of the non-Chalcedonian Ghassanids, who had previously arbitrated ecclesiastical disputes, Arabia was an ideal location for the meeting between the two patriarchs under the arbitration of the Ghassanid phylarch Jafna.

Thus the phylarch Jafna presided over two ill-fated meetings in Arabia in 587, the first of which was held at a monastery, and the second took place at the Church of Saint Sergius at Jabiyah. Both meetings were tumultuous as Damian's entourage created commotion and Jafna could not impose order on the proceedings. Nothing came of the discussions as no agreement could be made on the location or participants of a synod to discuss their theological disagreement, and ultimately Jafna gave up and left out of frustration. Peter continued to push for a resolution, and he followed Damian when he returned to Egypt after the assembly in Arabia, but this was in vain as Damian evaded any meeting by travelling from monastery to monastery.

=== Later life ===
Peter's failure to end the dispute with Damian even after he had followed him to Egypt led him to write a treatise later named Contra Damianum ("Against Damian") to provide an account of the dispute between the two patriarchs. The treatise served as a defence against Damian's accusations of sabellianism and tritheism, and at its end Peter declared an end to the communion with Damian, thus officially marking the schism between the Syrian and Egyptian non-Chalcedonian churches. Peter later died of natural causes on 22 April 591, and was buried at the monastery of Gubo Baroyo.

== Works ==
Peter is known to have written an anaphora in Syriac, which survives in two manuscripts dated to the 15th century, and a poem on the crucifixion in Syriac, of which a single manuscript likely from the end of the 6th century is still extant.

Contra Damianum ("Against Damian") survives in six manuscripts, the most complete of which includes chapters five to twenty-two of book two, and all fifty chapters of book three. In the treatise, Peter utilised quotations from Church Fathers to support his argument, including Athanasius of Alexandria, Basil of Caesarea, Cyril of Alexandria, Eustathius of Antioch, Gregory of Nazianzus, Gregory of Nyssa, John Chrysostom, and Severus of Antioch. He quoted at least 107 passages from 27 of Severus' works.

== Bibliography ==
Primary sources

- Bar Hebraeus. Ecclesiastical History. Translated by Marianna Mazzola. PSL Research University.

Secondary sources

- Allen, Pauline (2011). "Episcopal Succession in Antioch in the Sixth Century". In Johan Leemans; Peter Van Nuffelen; Shawn W. J. Keough; Carla Nicolaye (eds.). Episcopal Elections in Late Antiquity. Walter de Gruyter GmbH. pp. 23–39.
- Barsoum, Ephrem (2003). The Scattered Pearls: A History of Syriac Literature and Sciences. Translated by Matti Moosa (2nd ed.). Gorgias Press.
- Brock, Sebastian P. (2011). "Yuḥanon Barbur". In Sebastian P. Brock; Aaron M. Butts; George A. Kiraz; Lucas Van Rompay (eds.). Gorgias Encyclopedic Dictionary of the Syriac Heritage: Electronic Edition.
- Ebied, Rifaat; Van Roey, Albert; Wickham, Lionel R. (1981). Peter of Callinicum: Anti-Tritheist Dossier. Peeters Publishers.
- Ebied, Rifaat (2016). "Quotations from the Works of St. Severus of Antioch in Peter of Callinicus' magnum opus 'Contra Damianum'". In Youhanna Youssef; John D'Alton (eds.). Severus of Antioch: His Life and Times. Brill. pp. 65–123.
- Fiey, Jean Maurice (2004). Lawrence Conrad (ed.). Saints Syriaques (in French). The Darwin Press.
- Grillmeier, Aloys; Hainthaler, Theresia (1996). Christ in Christian Tradition: Volume 2 Part 4: The Churches of Jerusalem and Antioch. Translated by O.C. Dean, Jr. Mowbray.
- Grillmeier, Aloys; Hainthaler, Theresia (2013). Christ in Christian Tradition: Volume 2 Part 3: The Churches of Jerusalem and Antioch. Translated by Marianne Ehrhardt. Oxford University Press.
- Hainthaler, Theresia (2004). "The Christological Controversy on Proba and John Barbur". Het Christelijk Oosten. 56 (1): 155–170.
- Harrack, Amir (1999). The Chronicle of Zuqnin, Parts III and IV A.D. 488–775. Toronto: Pontifical Institute of Mediaeval Studies. ISBN 9780888442864.
- Hoyland, Robert (2009). "Late Roman Provincia Arabia, Monophysite Monks and Arab Tribes: a Problem of Centre and Periphery". Semitica et Classica. 2: 117–139. doi:10.1484/J.SEC.1.100513.
- Bishop Kyrillos (2017). "John of Barullos (540–615)". In Gawdat Gabra; Hany N. Takla (eds.). Christianity and Monasticism in Northern Egypt: Beni Suef, Giza, Cairo, and the Nile Delta. Oxford University Press. pp. 1–11.
- Leemans, Johan (2011). "Logic and the Trinity: Introducing Text and Context of Gregory of Nyssa's Ad Graecos". In Volker Henning Drecoll; Margitta Berghaus (eds.). Gregory of Nyssa: The Minor Treatises on Trinitarian Theology and Apollinarism. Brill. pp. 111–130.
- Palmer, Andrew (1990). Monk and Mason on the Tigris Frontier: The Early History of Tur Abdin. Cambridge University Press.
- Shahîd, Irfan (1995). Byzantium and the Arabs in the Sixth Century, Volume I, Part 2: Ecclesiastical History. Dumbarton Oaks.
- Van Rompay, Lucas (2011). "Pawlos of Beth Ukome". In Sebastian P. Brock; Aaron M. Butts; George A. Kiraz; Lucas Van Rompay (eds.). Gorgias Encyclopedic Dictionary of the Syriac Heritage: Electronic Edition.
- Wickham, Lionel R. (2008). "Schism and reconciliation in a sixth-century Trinitarian dispute: Damian of Alexandria and Peter of Callinicus on 'properties, roles and relations'". International Journal for the Study of the Christian Church. 8 (1): 3–15. doi:10.1080/14742250701841673. S2CID 170103621.
- Wickham, Lionel R. (2011). "Peter of Kallinikos". In Sebastian P. Brock; Aaron M. Butts; George A. Kiraz; Lucas Van Rompay (eds.). Gorgias Encyclopedic Dictionary of the Syriac Heritage: Electronic Edition.
- Wilmshurst, David (2019). "West Syrian patriarchs and maphrians". In Daniel King (ed.). The Syriac World. Routledge. pp. 806–813.

Preceded by Paul II	Syriac Orthodox Patriarch of Antioch; 581–591	Succeeded by Julian II
