= Al-Nu'man ibn al-Mundhir =

Al-Nu'man ibn al-Mundhir may refer to:

- al-Nu'man III ibn al-Mundhir, last king of the Lakhmids (r. 580–602)
- al-Nu'man VI ibn al-Mundhir, last king of the Ghassanids (r. 581–583)
