= Amr ibn Jafnah =

First Christian Ghassanid king

- King of the Ghassanids
- Reign: 265–270 CE
- Predecessor: Jafnah ibn Amr
- Successor: Tha'laba ibn Amr
- Died: c. 270 CE
- House: Ghassanids
- Religion: Christianity prev. South Arabian polytheism

'Amr ibn Jafnah (Arabic: عمرو بن جفنة) was a poet and the second of the Ghassanid rulers, as well as the first Christian king in the ruling dynasty. He succeeded his father, Jafnah. 'Amr was known for his conflicts with the Salihids and the Roman Empire.

== Biography ==
=== Family ===
Being the son of Jafnah, 'Amr would have been descended from the Arabian king Muzayqiya as well as the Azd tribal group. 'Amr had a son named Tha'laba, who succeeded him.

=== Rule ===
'Amr took the throne after his father had died. He became the first of the Ghassanid rulers to adopt the tradition of wearing a crown. His rule is dated to 265–270 CE. According to the historian Ibn Hisham, the Ghassanids had several military campaigns and battles led by 'Amr which were fought against the Roman Empire and the Salihids, the latter having acted treacherously against the Ghassanids. Towards the end of the reign of 'Amr, the Romans made a reconciliation with the Ghassanids and signed an agreement which ensured peace amongst them.

== Personal interests ==
=== Religions ===
'Amr ibn Jafnah was a convert to Christianity, and the first of the Ghassanid rulers to become a Christian. Under his rule, Christian monasteries were built in Syria. The Ghassanids, now Christians, would become allies of the Byzantines in later years.

=== Poetry ===
Aside from his career as a ruler, 'Amr also had an interest in poetry; having composed a poem after his battle with the Salihids.

== See also ==
- Ghassanids
- Arab Christians
- Christianity in pre-Islamic Arabia
