= Longinus (missionary) =

Christian missionary

Longinus (Greek: Λογγῖνος; fl. 565–580) was a Byzantine Monophysite missionary and the first ordained Christian bishop in Nubia. The main sources for his life are his contemporary and fellow Monophysite, John of Ephesus, who knew him; the 9th-century historian Eutychius of Alexandria; and the 15th-century Muslim historian al-Maqrizi. John includes a letter written by Longinus in his chronicle.

== Early life ==
Longinus was a native of Alexandria in Egypt, who became a member of the Church of Antioch. The Patriarch Paul II sent him on a mission to Constantinople, the capital of the Byzantine Empire, where he was detained on the orders of the Emperor Justinian I. He was even imprisoned for a time by Justinian's successor, Justin II, on account of his Monophysitism. He escaped from prison and returned to Egypt in 567.

== Missionary activity in Nobadia ==
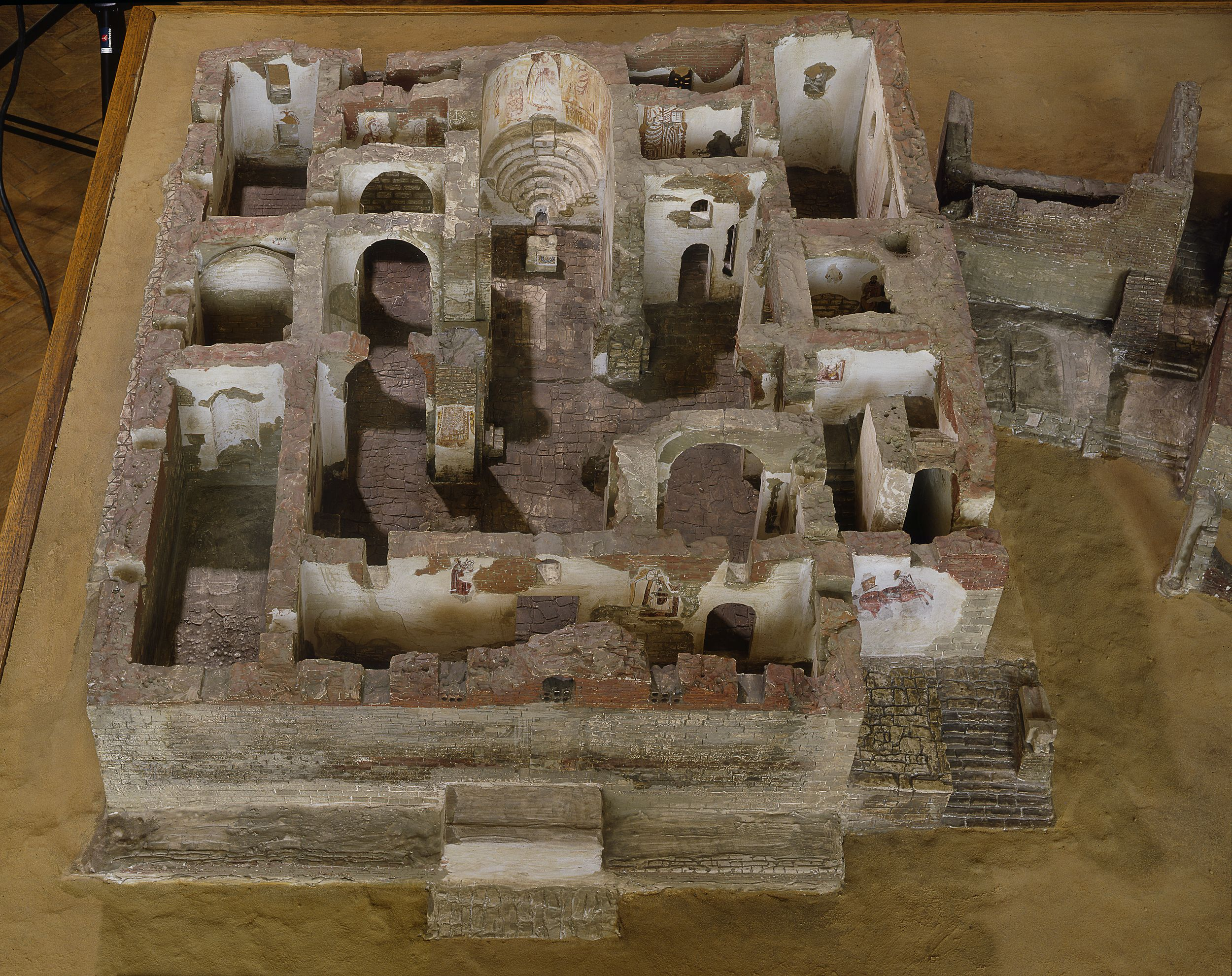
Model of the ruins of Faras Cathedral, probably built over the mudbrick church founded by Longinus.

On his deathbed, Patriarch Theodosius I of Alexandria commissioned Longinus to continue the evangelisation of the Nubian kingdom of Nobadia that had begun under Julian the Evangelist and Theodore of Philae in 543, but had been interrupted in 551. Longinus arrived in Nobadia in 569 and remained for six years. He built the first church in Nubia, probably the mudbrick building which was discovered beneath the ruins of Faras Cathedral. He also established clergy and a liturgy, effectively institutionalising the Nubian church.

In 575, Longinus was consulted by Syrian envoys concerning the readmission of the deposed Patriarch Paul II into communion. That same year, Longinus returned to Alexandria because Theodosius had died and the patriarchal office was vacant. In a disputed election, Longinus took the side of the Syriac candidate over the Egyptian. When his candidate lost, he was forced to go into exile in Arabia. In 580, he returned to Nobadia. While he was there the king of Nobadia received a letter from the king of Alodia requesting that the bishop who converted Nobadia be sent to the southernmost Nubian kingdom to baptise the Alodians. Longinus had at that time been bishop of Nobadia for eighteen years.

== Missionary activity in Alodia ==
Longinus was unable to travel up the Nile to Alodia because the kingdom of Makuria that lay between Nobadia and Alodia had adopted the non-Monophysite Chalcedonian creed and the Makurian king intended to intercept and arrest Longinus. Accompanied by a Nobadian royal escort, he took the Korosko Road through the Eastern Desert in a Blemmyan camel caravan. According to John of Ephesus, the heat was so intense that seventeen camels died on the journey. He was welcomed in Alodia by a royal delegation and given a royal audience. His mission was, according to his account, a complete success. The royal court and all the nobility received baptism.

Longinus sent a report to the king of Nobadia, who sent his own letter to the patriarch of Alexandria. The king of Alodia also sent a letter to the king of Nobadia thanking him for sending the "holy father" Longinus to Alodia. All three letters were copied by John of Ephesus into his chronicle. Longinus' subsequent career is totally unknown.

== Legacy ==
Salim Faraji calls Longinus, the Patriarch Theodosius and the Empress Theodora (who commissioned Julian for the Nubian mission field) the "Monophysite Triumvirate" of the sixth century for their role in maintaining and expanding the Monophysite church. The Nubian mission to which they were all connected was "one of the earliest manifestations of imperial Christianity in Africa".

== Sources ==
- Adams, William Y. (1991). "Longinus". In Aziz Suryal Atiya (ed.). The Coptic Encyclopedia. Vol. 5. New York: Macmillan Publishers. cols. 1479b–1480b.
- Faraji, Salim (2012). "Longinus". In Emmanuel Kwaku Akyeampong; Henry Louis Gates (eds.). Dictionary of African Biography. Vol. 3. Oxford University Press. pp. 516–518.
- Grillmeier, Aloys; Hainthaler, Theresia (1996). Christ in Christian Tradition, Volume 2: From the Council of Chalcedona (451) to Gregory the Great (590–604), Part 4: The Church in Alexandria, with Nubia and Ethiopia after 451. Westminster John Knox Press.
- Moawad, Samuel (2013). "Christianity on Philae". In Gawdat Gabra; Hany N. Takla (eds.). Christianity and Monasticism in Aswan and Nubia. Cairo: American University in Cairo Press. pp. 27–38. ISBN 978-977-416-561-0.
- Richter, Siegfried G. (2013). "The Beginnings of Christianity in Nubia". In Gawdat Gabra; Hany N. Takla (eds.). Christianity and Monasticism in Aswan and Nubia. Cairo: American University in Cairo Press. pp. 47–54. ISBN 978-977-416-561-0.
- Welsby, Derek (2002). The Medieval Kingdoms of Nubia. Pagans, Christians and Muslims Along the Middle Nile. British Museum. ISBN 978-0-7141-1947-2.
