= Suzanne Dixon =

Australian classical scholar

Suzanne Dixon (born 1946) is an Australian classical scholar, widely recognised as an authority on women's history and particularly marriage and motherhood.

== Career ==
Dixon's career spans posts at the Australian National University as well as the University of Queensland, where she was first reader, then Professor, in Classics and Ancient History. Her expertise on the position of women in the ancient world was recognised by the BBC History website, by whom she was asked to curate an educational resource on Roman women. Amy Richlin, currently professor of Classics at the University of California, Los Angeles, has cited Dixon as a great influence in shaping her own work on gender politics. Her 1992 monograph 'The Roman Family' is credited with being one of the key texts in the field.

She is currently without an academic post, but continues writing about the ancient world in a freelance capacity, such as her contribution as Honorary Research Consultant to a chapter on Roman marriage in The Wiley Companion to Families in the Greek and Roman Worlds.

== Personal life ==
Dixon lives on an island in Moreton Bay, off the coast of South Queensland, Australia.

== Publications ==
Articles

- 'Infirmitas Sexus: Womanly Weakness in Roman Law', Tijdschrift voor Rechtsgeschiedenis / Revue d'Histoire du Droit / The Legal History Review, 1984, Vol.52(4), pp. 343–371
- 'Breaking the law to do the right thing: the gradual erosion of the Voconian Law in ancient Rome', Adelaide Law Review, May, 1985, Vol.9(4), p. 519-534
- 'Polybius on Roman Women and Property', The American Journal of Philology, 1 July 1985, Vol.106(2), pp. 147–170
- 'Gracious Patrons and Vulgar Success Stories in Roman Public Media', Memoirs of the American Academy in Rome. Supplementary Volumes, 1 January 2008, Vol.7, pp. 57–68

Monographs

- The Roman Mother (Norman: University of Oklahoma Press, 1987)
- The Roman Family (Baltimore: Johns Hopkins University Press, 1992)
- Reading Roman women (London: Duckworth, 2001)
- Cornelia: mother of the Gracchi (London: Routledge, 2007)

Edited collections

- Stereotypes of women in power : historical perspectives and revisionist views. Edited by Barbara Garlick, Suzanne Dixon, and Pauline Allen (Newport: Greenwood, 1992)
- Childhood, class and kin in the Roman world. Edited by Suzanne Dixon (London: Routledge, 2001)

Book chapters

- 'Family Finances: Terentia and Tullia', in: The Family in Ancient Rome: New Perspectives. Edited by Beryl Rawon (Ithaca: Cornell University Press, 1987)
- 'Exemplary housewife or luxurious slut: cultural representations of women in the Roman economy', in: Women's influence on classical civilization. Edited by Fiona McHardy and Eireann Marshall (London: Routledge, 2004)
- 'Family', in: The Oxford handbook of Roman law and society. Edited by Paul J. du Plessis, Clifford Ando, and Kaius Tuori (Oxford: Oxford University Press, 2016)
