= Charles-Hyacinthe Hugo =

French writer and bishop (1667–1739)

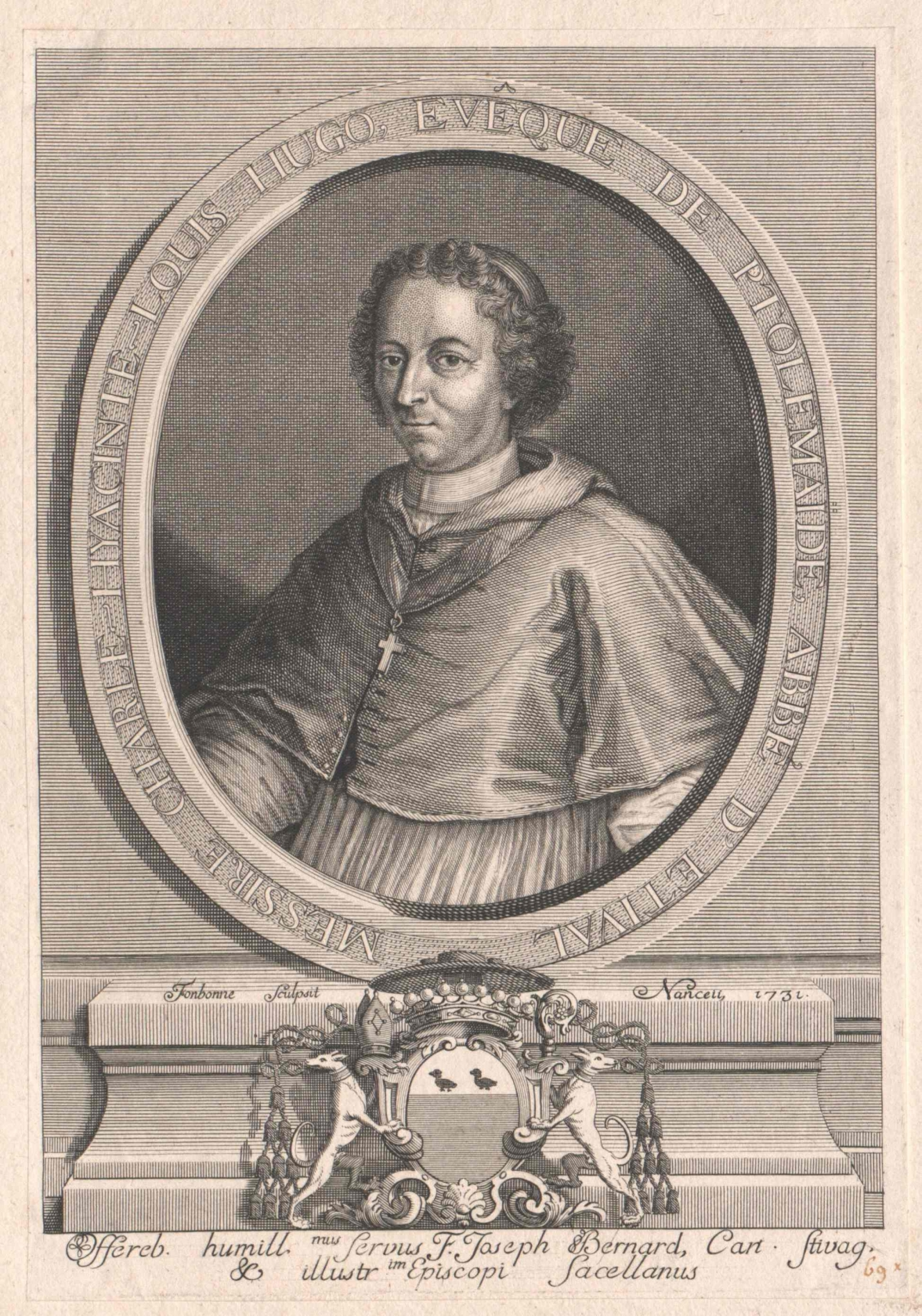
Charles-Hyacinthe Hugo

Charles-Hyacinthe Hugo (20 September 1667 – 2 August 1739), also called Louis-Charles Hugo, was a Lorrain Premonstratensian author.

== Biography ==
Hugo was born on 20 September 1667 in Saint-Mihiel. He entered the Norbertine novitiate at Pont-à-Mousson, where he pronounced his vows on 28 August 1685, receiving the name in religion of Louis. He went through his course of philosophy and theology at the Abbey of Jovillier, near Bar-le-Duc in Lorraine, and afterwards at the University of Bourges, where he graduated as Doctor of Theology in 1690 or 1691. Having taught theology in the Abbey of Jandeures, and later in that of Étival in Lorraine, he was named prior of St. Joseph's at Nancy in 1700, where he remained until 1713, although in 1708 he had been elected coadjutor of the Abbey of Flabémont, then held in commendam by Nicholas Brisacier, doctor of the Sorbonne, a secular priest.

On 12 August 1710, Hugo was chosen coadjutor to Siméon Godin, Abbot of Étival (Stivagium), and the choice having been ratified by Pope Clement XI, he was installed with the title of Abbot of Fontaine-André, a suppressed Norbertine abbey in Switzerland, by the Prince-Bishop of Basel on 23 July 1712. Ten years later, Siméon resigned the direction of the abbey, and Hugo was unanimously elected in his place on 22 October 1722. Though now at the head of one of the largest abbeys in Lorraine, Hugo found time to co-ordinate the numerous documents he had collected and the notes he had made with a view to the publication of three of his most important works, the Sacræ antiquitatis monumenta, the Annales Ordinis Præmonstratensis and the History of Lorraine. To give his personal attention to their publication, he even favoured the erection of printing presses at Étival itself.

A conflict respecting the right of exemption which the Abbot of Étival claimed for his abbey arose at that time between the abbot and the Bishop of Toul. The cause was brought to Rome, where Niccolò Maria Lercari, Cardinal Secretary of State, warmly upheld the contention of Hugo. To put an end to this incident, Benedict XIII named Hugo Bishop of Ptolemais in partibus in the consistory of 15 December 1728.

Hugo had long planned to write a full and detailed history of the Norbertine Order, and in 1717 the general chapter of the order had encouraged him to carry out his plan by naming him historiographer of the order and by requesting all the abbots to give him all the information they possessed concerning their abbeys. The first two volumes of the "Annales" had already been published and the third was in the hands of the royal censor when Hugo died.

== Works and legacy ==
Auguste Digot says with reference to the History of Lorraine that it surpasses that of Antoine Augustin Calmet, Abbot of Senones, whose style is heavy and diffuse.

In 1699 Hugo published a Refutation of the system of the trithiest Faydit on the Blessed Trinity; it was a solid work, according to Jean-Noël Paquot.

He is also the author of some books on the Order of Canons Regular, one of which is favourably referred to by Benedict XIV; likewise of several dissertations on seals, coins or medals, on persons and historical matters appertaining to the ducal house of Lorraine.

On 17 March 1708, he was made by Duke Leopold a member of his privy council and requested to write the history of Lorraine. Hugo set to work with his usual energy and the work was ready in 1713, but Leopold, fearing owing to Hugo's previous writings that this history might too much displease the royal house of France, asked Calmet to write the history instead of Hugo. Hugo's Vie de St. Norbert, fondateur des Prémontrés (Luxembourg, 1704) is remarkable for the elegance of its style and the important documents it contains.

His two monumental works are:

1. Sacræ antiquitatis monumenta historica, dogmatica, diplomatica, notis illustrata, in two volumes. The first volume was published in 1725; the second, after Hugo's death, in 1744;
2. Sacri et Canonici Ordinis Præmonstratensis Annales, in two volumes, giving in alphabetical order the history of each Norbertine abbey.

There are two more volumes of probationes "essays", such as charters etc., respecting each abbey. The third volume, with the title Annales Ordinis Præmonstratensis Sæculum Primum (1120–1220), which was to be followed by four more volumes, was ready for the press when Hugo died. After Hugo's death the Abbey of Étival was given in commendam to the Bishop of Toul, and for one reason or another the third volume was never printed.

Hugo's manuscripts, forming eighteen volumes in folio, each of from 500 to 600 pages, are now preserved in the seminary of Nancy. They are fully described by Jean Michel Alfred Vacant, professor at the seminary, in La Bibliothèque du Grand Séminaire de Nancy (1897).
