= Bronwen Neil =

Australian academic

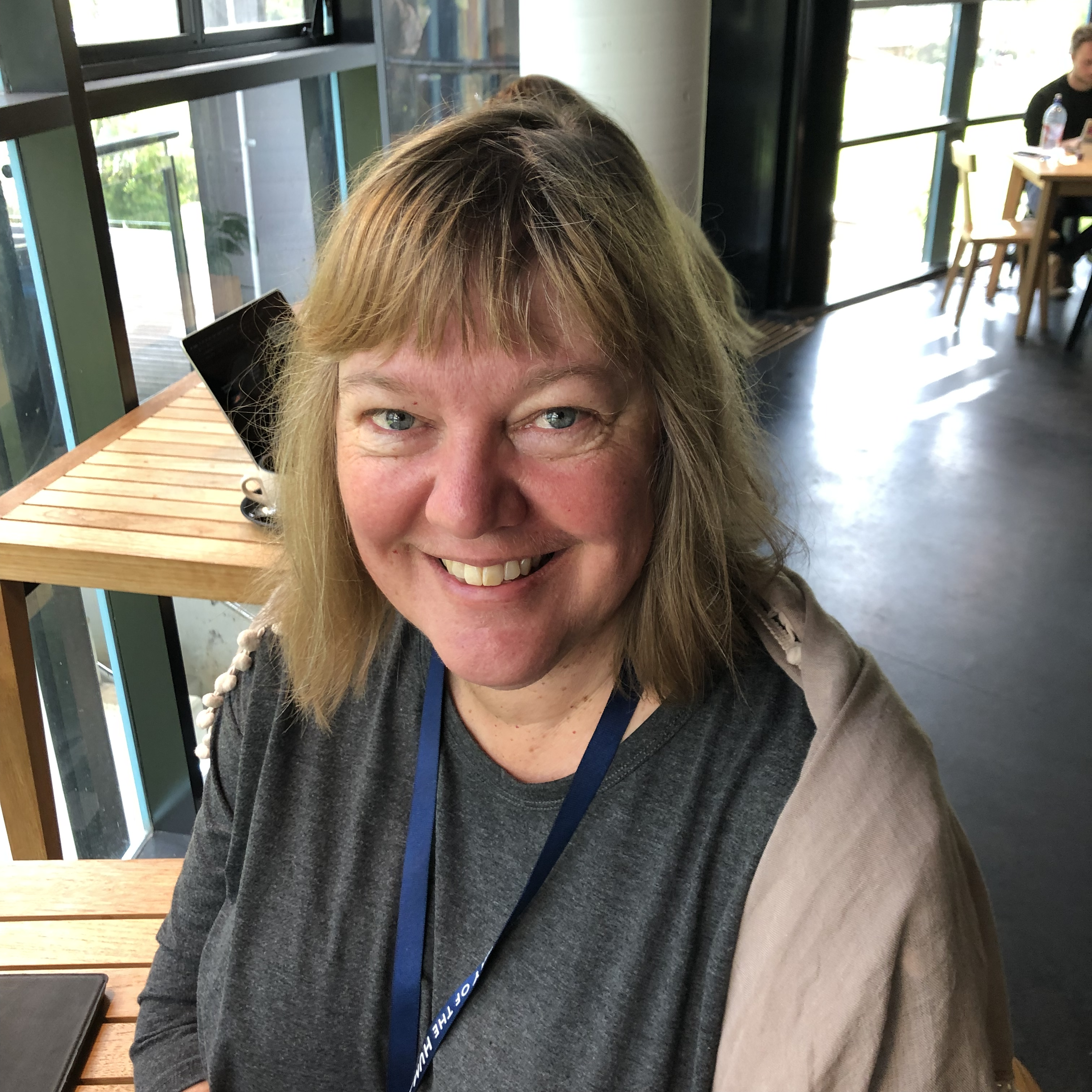
Professor Bronwen Neil

Bronwen Neil FAHA (born 1969) is an Australian academic. She is a Professor of Ancient History at Macquarie University. She is an expert on Byzantine Greek and medieval literature, early Christianity, and ancient letter collections in Greek and Latin.

== Career and research ==
Neil received her PhD from the Australian Catholic University in 1999. Her doctoral thesis was entitled A critical edition of Anastasius Bibliothecarius' Latin translation of Greek documents pertaining to the life of Maximus the Confessor, with an analysis of Anastasius' translation methodology, and an English translation of the Latin text.

Neil has published widely on the Byzantine empire and the early Church, including nine monographs. She is Director of the Centre for Ancient Cultural Heritage and Environment at Macquarie University.

Neil is an Institute of Advanced Study Fellow at Trevelyan College, Durham University (January – March 2020). She is a Research Fellow in the Department of Biblical and Ancient Studies at the University of South Africa. She was the President of the Australian Association for Byzantine Studies. She has written for The Conversation. She was elected a Fellow of the Australian Academy of the Humanities in 2012.

== Selected works ==
- (with Doru Costache and Kevin Wagner) Dreams, Virtue and Divine Knowledge in Early Christian Egypt (Cambridge: Cambridge University Press, 2019)
- (ed.) Dreams, Memory, and Imagination in Byzantium (Leiden: Brill, 2018)
- Collecting Early Christian Letters: From the Apostle Paul to Late Antiquity (Cambridge: Cambridge University Press, 2015)
- (with Pauline Allen) (eds.), The Oxford Handbook to Maximus Confessor (Oxford: Oxford University Press, 2015)
- The Letters of Gelasius I (492-496): Pastor and Micro-Manager of the Church of Rome (Turnhout: Brepols, 2014)
- (with Linda Garland) (eds.) Questions of Gender in Byzantine Society (Farnham: Ashgate, 2013)
- A Companion to Gregory the Great (Leiden: Brill, 2013)
- (with Pauline Allen) Crisis Management in Late Antiquity (410-590 CE): A Survey of the Evidence from Episcopal Letters, Supplements to Vigiliae Christianae 121 (Leiden: Brill, 2013)
- Leo the Great (London: Routledge, 2009)
- Seventh-century Popes and Martyrs: the Political Hagiography of Anastasius Bibliothecarius (Turnhout: Brepol, 2006)
