= Ghassanids =

Christian Arab tribe

Ghassanid kingdom الغساسنة
- 220–638
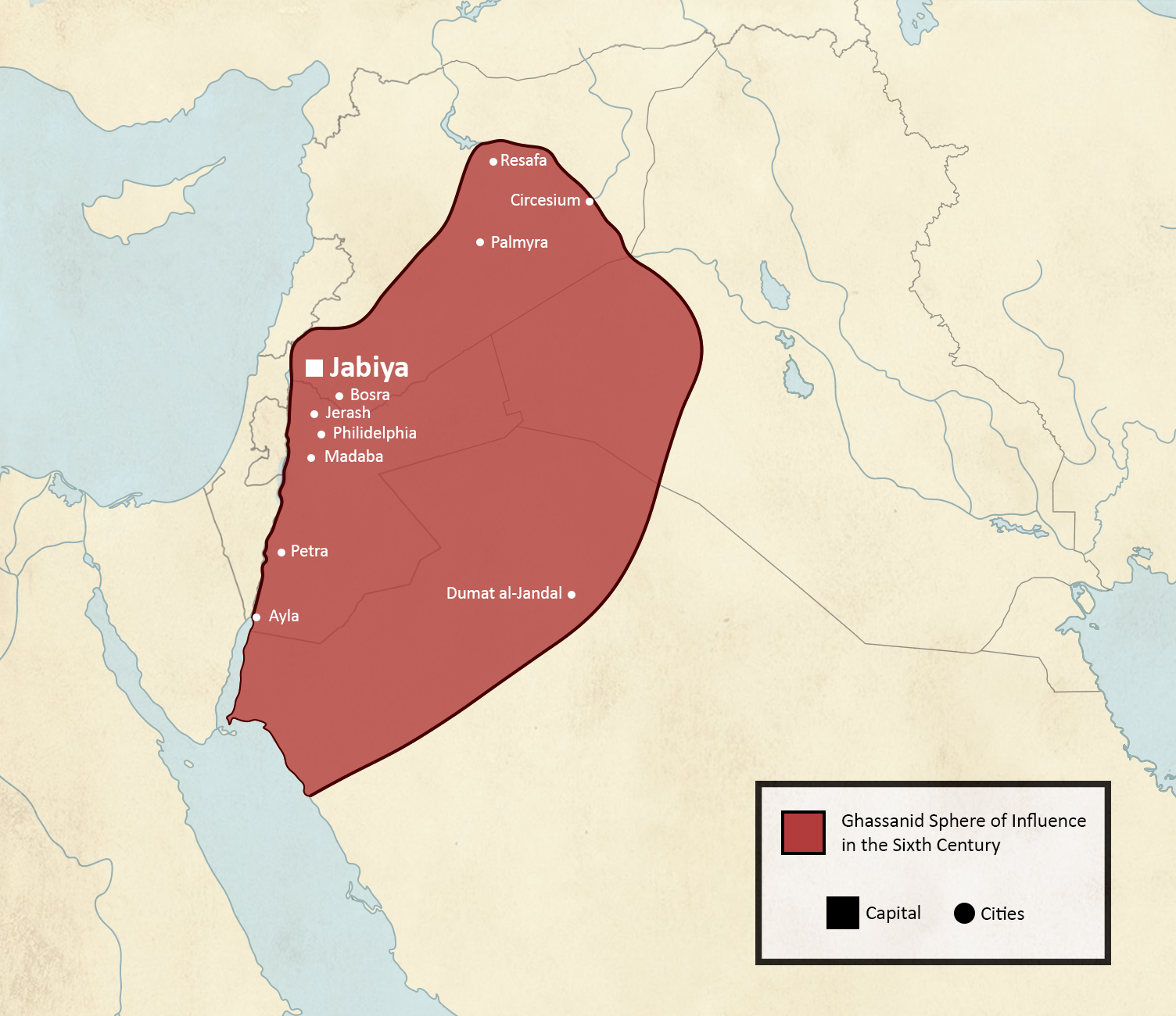
- Status: Vassal of the Eastern Roman Empire
- Capital: Jabiyah
- Common languages: Old Arabic
- Religion: Miaphysite Christianity (official)
- Government: Monarchy
- King
  - 220–265: Jafnah ibn Amr (first)
  - 632–638: Jabala ibn al-Ayham (last)
- History
  - Established: 220
  - Participation in the Roman–Persian wars: 220–628
  - Muslim conquest of the Levant: 634–638
  - Annexation by the Rashidun Caliphate: 638
Preceded by	Succeeded by
Salihids	Rashidun Caliphate

The Ghassanids, (Note: Arabic: الغساسنة, romanized: al-Ġasāsina, also Banu Ghassān (بنوغسان, romanized as: Banū Ġasān; Latin: Ghassanidae; Ancient Greek: Γασσανίδες, Gassanídes) also known as the Jafnids, were an Arab Christian kingdom. A confederation of Arab tribes based in the Levant, Genealogies trace their ancestry back to the Azd tribe of Arabia. They became clients of the Roman Empire, serving as foederati responsible for defending the eastern frontier of the empire against Bedouin raids and rival powers.

As Roman allies, the Ghassanids frequently fought against the Lakhmid kingdom, a rival Arab polity allied with the Sasanian Empire, and played a significant role in the Roman–Persian conflicts of late antiquity. During this period, they converted to Christianity and emerged as one of the most prominent Arab Christian groups in the pre-Islamic Near East.

At the height of their power in the 6th century, particularly under the reign of Justinian I, the Ghassanids rose from being one of several Arab allies of Byzantium to exercising collective authority over them all, forming a broad confederation of Arab tribes. This ushered in period of unprecedented Arab statesmanship and leadership. Although relations with Byzantium were occasionally strained, the Ghassanids remained key allies of the empire until the early 7th century, participating in the final Byzantine–Sasanian War of 602–628.

The early Muslim conquests closed the period of Ghassanid power in the Near East, as both Romans and Persians rapidly lost territory. In 636, the Ghassanids faced a decisive military defeat at the Battle of the Yarmuk and fell under the rule of the Rashidun Caliphate. The Ghassanids largely retained their Christian affiliation, dispersing into the Melkite and Syriac churches.

== History ==
=== Origins ===
Christian J. Robin's study of pre-Islamic epigraphy has suggested that between the third and fourth centuries CE, the Ghassanids were the main tribal confederation acting in the Hejaz, with a base that may have been stationed at Medina. Additional support for this geography has come from new discoveries. The period of Ghassanid domination of this region ended when the Ghassanids migrated northwards, into the territory of Syria, which would remain their main base of operations until Islamic times.

In the Arab genealogical tradition, which developed during the early Islamic period (7th-10th centuries), the Ghassanids were considered a branch of the Azd tribe of South Arabia. In this genealogical scheme, their ancestor was Jafna, a son of Amr Muzayqiya ibn Amir ibn Haritha ibn Imru al-Qays ibn Tha'laba ibn Mazin ibn Azd, through whom the Ghassanids were purportedly linked with the Ansar (the Aws and Khazraj tribes of Medina), who were the descendants of Jafna's brother Tha'laba. According to the historian Brian Ulrich, the links between Ghassan, the Ansar, and the wider Azd are historically tenuous, as these groups are almost always counted separately from each other in sources other than post-8th-century genealogical works and the story of the 'Scattering of Azd'. In the latter story, the Azd migrate northward from South Arabia and different groups of the tribe split off in different directions, with the Ghassan being one such group. Per the "Scattering of Azd" story, the Ghassanids eventually settled within the Roman limes. The tradition of Ghassanid migration finds support in the Geography of Ptolemy, which locates a tribe called the Kassanitai south of the Kinaidokolpitai and the river Baitios (probably the wadi Baysh). These are probably the people called Casani in Pliny the Elder, Gasandoi in Diodorus Siculus and Kasandreis in Photios I of Constantinople (relying on older sources).

The date of the migration to the Levant is unclear, but they are believed to have first arrived in the region of Syria between 250 and 300, with later waves of migration circa 400. Their earliest appearance in records is dated to 473, when their chief, Amorkesos, signed a treaty with the Byzantine Empire acknowledging their status as foederati controlling parts of Palestine.

=== Byzantine period ===
==== Becoming clients of the Byzantines ====
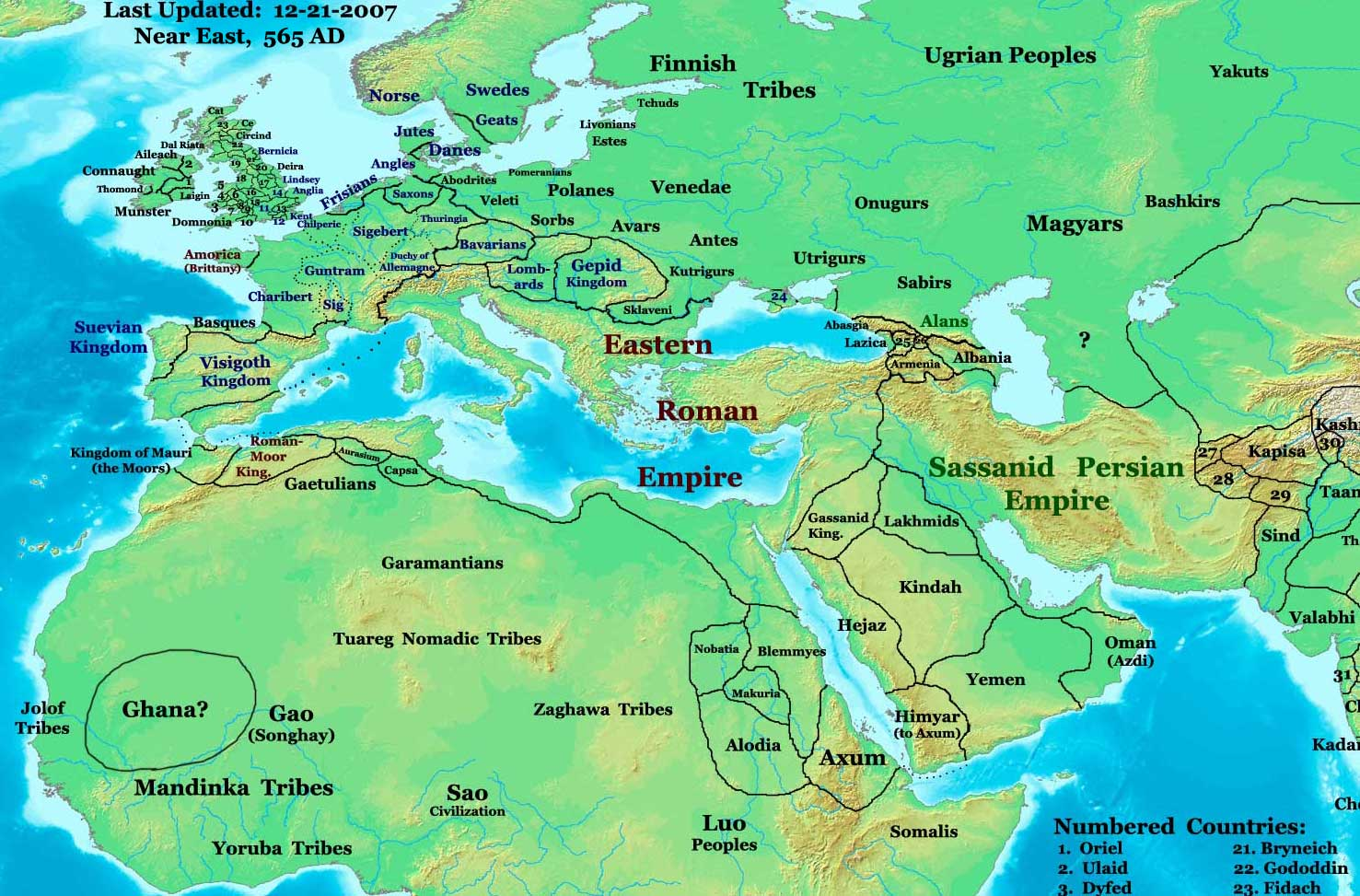
Near East in 565, showing the Ghassanids and their neighbors.

After originally settling in the Levant, the Ghassanids became a client state to the Byzantine Empire. The Romans found a powerful ally in the Ghassanids who acted as a buffer zone against the Lakhmids. In addition, as kings of their own people, they were also phylarchs, native rulers of client frontier states. The capital was at Jabiyah in the Golan Heights. Geographically, it occupied much of the eastern Levant, and its authority extended via tribal alliances with other Azdi tribes all the way to the northern Hijaz as far south as Yathrib (Medina).

==== Military rivalry with the Persians and Sasanians ====
The Ghassanids fought alongside the Eastern Roman Empire against the Persian Sasanians and Arab Lakhmids. The lands of the Ghassanids also continually acted as a buffer zone, protecting Byzantine lands against raids by Bedouin tribes. Among their Arab allies were the Banu Judham and Banu Amilah.

The Byzantines were focused more on the East and a long war with the Sasanians was always their main concern. The Ghassanids maintained their rule as the guardian of trade routes, policed Lakhmid tribes and was a source of troops for the imperial army. The Ghassanid king al-Harith ibn Jabalah (reigned 529–569) supported the Byzantines against the Sasanians and was given in 529 by the emperor Justinian I, the highest imperial title that was ever bestowed upon a foreign ruler; also the status of patricians. In addition to that, al-Harith ibn Jabalah was given the rule over all the Arab allies of the Byzantine Empire. Al-Harith was a Miaphysite Christian; he helped to revive the Syrian Miaphysite (Jacobite) Church and supported Miaphysite development despite Orthodox Byzantium regarding it as heretical. Later Byzantine mistrust and persecution of such religious unorthodoxy brought down his successors, Al-Mundhir III ibn al-Harith (r. 569–582).

The Ghassanids, who had successfully opposed the Lakhmids of al-Hirah in Lower Mesopotamia, prospered economically and engaged in much religious and public building; they also patronized the arts and at one time entertained the Arab poets al-Nabighah and Hassan ibn Thabit at their courts.

==== The "Dissolution" period under Maurice (582–585 AD) ====
As the Ghassanids gained overwhelming power in the second half of the sixth century, having transitioned well past the level of disorganized raiders from earlier centuries, the Byzantine rulers began to see them as a dangerous force that could vie for independence.

The dissolution of the Ghassanid confederation came during the reign of the emperor Maurice, and materialized as negotiations aimed at settling the differences between the Byzantines and the Ghassanids failed. Upon the accession of Maurice to the Byzantine throne, the phylarch Al-Nu'man travelled to the Byzantine court at Constantinople. The Byzantines demanded Al-Nu'man resume the war against the Persians and accept the Chalcedonian doctrine (as the Ghassanids believed in Monophysitism). Al-Nu'man refused both. As he was travelling back, to the Oriens (Diocese of the East), he was arrested: Al-Nu'man was tried and sentenced for treason.

After the arrest of Al-Nu'man, the Byzantines announced the end of the Ghassanid phylarchate and tribal alliance. The confederation was dissolved into its 15 member tribes, with the tribe of Ghassan losing sway over a once large confederation of loyal tribes. Some of these tribes decided to remain allied with the Byzantines as individuals, whereas other dissatisfied groups joined the Persian constellation of power. Other groups chose other paths.

==== The restoration under Maurice (585–602 AD) ====
The dissolution of the Ghassanid phylarcate did not last very long. After two or three years, Maurice came to the realization that he was not able to defend the Oriens without the help of the Ghassanids, who the Byzantines had already relied on for this job for most of the sixth century up until that point. The Ghassanid confederation was restored (even though they remained Monophysite), and the Ghassanids returned to their military ventures against the Persians. Information about the Ghassanids becomes scarce for much of the remainder of the reign of Maurice until his death in 602 AD. The exception is some information about the phylarch Jafnah, brother of Al-Nu'man, active between 587 and 591 AD, preserved by Michael the Syrian. Greek sources no longer mention the Ghassanids after 593/594 AD, although they were still important at this time and begin to appear in Arabic poetry. The poetry of Al-Nabigha says Al-Nu'man was returned to the Ghassanids in the 590s, became active again as a Ghassanid chief, and passed before 600.

==== The reign of Phocas (602–610 AD) ====
The accession of Phocas to the Byzantine throne in 602 AD came with an immediate restoration in relations between the Byzantines and the Ghassanids. Al-Mundhir III, the father of Al-Nu'man, was immediately released from his exile in Sicily. Unfortunately, nothing else is known about the return of Al-Mundhir. Towards the end of Phocas' time, relations with the Ghassanids may have soured again, as Phocas became more tyrannically ardent in the Dyophysite doctrine and began to crush Monophysite uprisings in the Oriens. The reaction of the Ghassanids to this episode is unknown, but Shahid mentions that they temporarily withdrew their service to the empire when a similar event took place in 519.

During the reign of Phocas, the Byzantine–Sasanian War of 602–628 broke out, and the Ghassanids played an essential role on the side of the Byzantines. The only surviving record of the role of the Ghassanids in the Byzantine-Sasanian war, during the reign of Phocas, is a long and detailed poem by Hassan ibn Thabit. Eight to ten verses from the poem are about the Ghassanids, providing the name of Ghassanid commanders (ʿAmr and Ḥujr), speaking of the Ghassanid war cry ("Yāla Ghassān iṣbirū": "O Ghassān, endure, stand fast!"), and the weapons they used (including broad swords and spears).

==== The reign of Heraclius (610–641 AD) ====
In the time of the emperor Heraclius, relations with the Ghassanids dramatically improved, and they became as good as they were at their height in the time of Justinian I. The three main episodes for the Ghassanids in this time period is the joint Ghassanid-Oriens armies fighting against the invasion of the Persians, and then a withdrawal by the Ghassanids to Anatolia where they fight alongside Heraclius in his counteroffensive to deliver a decisive blow to the Persians at the Battle of Nineveh (627), and lastly their fight against the Muslims in the Oriens where they are defeated at the Battle of the Yarmuk (636).

=== Early Islamic period ===
==== Muslim conquest of the Levant ====
The nascent Muslim state in Medina, first under the Islamic prophet Muhammad (d. 632) and lastly under the second caliph, Umar (r. 634–644), made abortive attempts to contact or win over the Ghassan of Syria. The last phylarch of the Ghassan, Jabala ibn al-Ayham, stories of whom are shrouded in legend, led his tribesmen and those of Byzantium's other allied Arab tribes in the Byzantine army that was routed by the Muslims at the Battle of Yarmouk in c. 636. After supposedly embracing Islam, Jabala left the faith and ultimately withdrew with his tribesmen from Syria to Byzantine-held Anatolia in 639, by which time the Muslims had conquered most of Byzantine Syria. Unable to make headway with the Ghassan, the Muslim administration in Syria under its governor Mu'awiya succeeded in allying with the Ghassan's old-established Syrian allies, the Banu Kalb. The latter became the cornerstone of Mu'awiya's military power in Syria, and later, when he became head of the Syria-based Umayyad Caliphate in 661, of the Islamic empire in general.

==== Umayyad and Abbasid periods ====
Significant remnants of the Ghassan remained in Syria, residing in Damascus and the city's Ghouta countryside. At least nominally and probably gradually, many of these Ghassanids embraced Islam, especially under Mu'awiya's rule. According to the historian Nancy Khalek, they consequently became an "indispensable" group of Muslim society in early Islamic Syria. Mu'awiya actively sought the militarily and administratively experienced Syrian Christians, including the Ghassanids, and members of the tribe served him and later Umayyad caliphs as governors, commanders of the shurta (select troops), scribes, and chamberlains. Several descendants of the tribe's Tha'laba and Imru al-Qays branches are listed in the sources as Umayyad court poets, jurists, and officials in the eastern provinces of Khurasan, Adharbayjan and Armenia.

When Mu'awiya's grandson, Caliph Mu'awiya II, died without a chosen successor amid the Second Muslim Civil War in 684, Umayyad rule was on the verge of collapse in Syria, having already collapsed throughout the caliphate, where the supporters of a rival caliph, the Mecca-based Ibn al-Zubayr, took charge. The Ghassan, along with their tribal allies in Syria, especially the Kalb, supported continued Umayyad rule to secure their interests under the dynasty, and nominated Mu'awiya's distant cousin, Marwan I, as caliph during a summit of the Syrian tribes in the old Ghassanid capital of Jabiyah. Dahhak ibn Qays al-Fihri, the governor of Damascus, meanwhile, threw his backing behind Ibn al-Zubayr. During the Battle of Marj Rahit, which pitted Marwan against Dahhak in a meadow north of Damascus, the scion of the Ghassanid family in Damascus, Yazid ibn Abi al-Nims, led a revolt there and secured control of the city for Marwan, who routed Dahhak and assumed office. In a poem attributed to him, Marwan lauds the Ghassan, as well as the Kalb, Kinda, and Tanukh of Syria, for supporting him.

The above tribes thereafter formed the Yaman faction, in opposition to the Qays tribes which backed Dahhak and Ibn al-Zubayr. The Qays–Yaman rivalry contributed to the downfall of Umayyad rule, with each faction supporting different Umayyad dynasts and governors in what became the Third Muslim Civil War. The Ghassanid Shabib ibn Abi Malik was a leader of the Yaman in Damascus and conspired to assassinate the pro-Qaysi Caliph al-Walid II (r. 743–744). After the latter was killed, the Ghassan marched on Damascus to help install his successor, the Yamani-backed Yazid III (r. 744–744). The toppling of the Umayyads and the advent of the Iraq-based Abbasid Caliphate in 750 "was disastrous for the power, wealth and status of the Arab tribes in Syria", including the Ghassan, according to the historian Hugh N. Kennedy. By the 9th century, the tribe had adopted a settled life, being recorded by the geographer al-Ya'qubi (d. 890) to be living in the Ghouta gardens region of Damascus and in Gharandal in Transjordan.

==== Scholarly families in Damascus ====
Two Damascene Ghassanid families in particular achieved prominence in early Islamic Syria, those of Yahya ibn Yahya al-Ghassani (d. 750s) and Abu Mushir al-Ghassani (d. 833). The former was the son of Caliph Marwan's head of the shurta, Yahya ibn Qays. Upon returning to Damascus after his stint as a governor of Mosul for the Umayyad caliph Umar II (r. 717–720), Yahya ibn Yahya took up scholarship and became known as the sayyid ahl Dimashq (leader of the people of Damascus), transmitting purported hadiths (traditions and utterances) of Muhammad, which he derived from his uncle Sulayman, who received the transmissions from Muhammad's Damascus-based companion, Abu Darda. Among some traditions sourced to Yahya ibn Yahya by later Muslim scholars are those regarding the discovery of John the Baptist's head in the Umayyad Mosque of Damascus and others which praise the mosque's splendor and the Umayyad dynasty in general. Yahya ibn Yahya's sons, grandsons, great-grandsons and great-great-grandsons continued their ancestor's interests in hadith scholarship and remained part of the Damascene elite into the mid-9th century.

Abu Mushir's grandfather, Abd al-A'la, was a hadith scholar and Abu Mushir studied under the famous Syrian scholar Sa'id ibn Abd al-Aziz al-Tanukhi. He became a prominent hadith scholar in Damascus, with special interest in the administrative history of Syria, its local elite's genealogies and local scholars. During the Fourth Muslim Civil War between the Abbasid dynasts, an Umayyad, Abu al-Umaytir al-Sufyani, took power in Syria in 811, in a bid to reestablish the Umayyad Caliphate. Abu Mushir, whose grandfather was killed by the Abbasids in 750, disdained the Iraqis represented by the Abbasids and supported the restoration of Umayyad rule. He served as Abu al-Umaytir's qadi (chief jurist), but was imprisoned by the Abbasids in the years following the rebellion's suppression in 813. His great-grandsons Abd al-Rabb ibn Muhammad and Amr ibn Abd al-A'la also attained fame as Damascene scholars.

== Religion ==
The Ghassanids were deeply intertwined with the Christological controversies of the fifth and sixth centuries. While the Byzantine central authority often promoted Chalcedonian Christianity, the Ghassanids were consistent advocates of the Miaphysite position.

=== Miaphysite position ===
The Ghassanids are often described as supporters of Miaphysite Christianity, particularly in the mid-sixth century. This view is based mainly on partisan Syriac authors such as John of Ephesus and Michael the Syrian, who portray Jafnid rulers as prominent allies of the Miaphysites and opponents of Chalcedonian Christianity. John of Ephesus credits Al-Harith with helping secure imperial approval for the consecration of Miaphysite bishops, including Jacob Baradaeus, and portrays Al-Mundhir as a participant of Miaphysite disputes and councils.

This picture of the Ghassanids from literary sources has been balanced with other evidence. Greek inscriptions and a Syriac letter from Miaphysite clergy associate the Jafnids with Miaphysite monasteries and networks but not engaging in sustained institutional patronage or exclusive confessional commitment. This supports a picture of a more flexible Jafnid Miaphysitism given the fragmented landscape of religious practices and political considerations in the sixth century.

=== Church politics ===
The Ghassanid phylarchs were active participants in high-level, international church politics. In the 540s, the Ghassanid ruler Al-Harith ibn Jabalah (Arethas) successfully petitioned or intervened for the ordination of several Miaphysite bishops: Jacob Baradaeus (the namesake of the "Jacobite" Syriac Orthodox Church) for the Patriarchate of Antioch, Theodore for Jerusalem, and Paul Ukkama for Antioch.

=== Monasticism and asceticism ===
The Ghassanids were patrons of a vibrant monastic culture. Within their realm, various denominations built churches and monasteries, and the phylarchs likely navigated the theological arguments of these groups to manage the affiliations of their subjects. They also showed a strong affinity for the extreme asceticism of the Stylites. For instance, the Miaphysite patriarch Severus addressed letters to several stylites within the Arab ecclesiastical sphere, which are preserved in the Documenta Monophysitarum.

=== Liturgical languages ===
While the Ghassanids used Arabic as their "internal" language, their religious life was conducted in the prestigious languages of the Church. Greek served as the official language for ecclesiastical hierarchy and communication with the empire, while Syriac was the dominant liturgical and cultural language of the Miaphysites. In some regions, Christian Palestinian Aramaic (CPA) was also visible in religious inscriptions.

=== Role in the spread of literacy ===
Emerging research suggests that the Ghassanids may have been agents for the dissemination of the Paleo-Arabic script. The most ancient Arabic inscriptions, often accompanied by images of crosses or found in Christian contexts, appear in regions where the Ghassanids were active, such as Hima in modern Saudi Arabia. This suggests that Arab Christians may have adopted a distinct written medium to assert an identity separate from the South Arabian scripts associated with Judaism.

=== Anti-Tritheist stance ===
The Ghassanid milieu was actively involved in theological disputes, such as the rejection of Tritheism. Archimandrites from monasteries in the province of Arabia sent letters, preserved today as the Letter of the Archimandrites of Arabia, in Syriac to Jacob Baradaeus disavowing the Tritheist position, which was accused of creating a "quaternity" by separating the substances of the Trinity.

== Architecture ==
Archaeological evidence indicates that the Ghassanids were closely associated with late antique Christian architecture in the Levant, though few securely attributed examples have been found. The Ghassanid identity of most sites associated with them lack concrete confirmation. For this reason, scholars have restricted securely identified Ghassanid buildings to those with epigraphic confirmation. Where such evidence exists, Jafnid architecture conforms closely to established Roman and Byzantine Christian forms, employing Greek inscriptions, standard church plans, and decorative programs common throughout Syria and Arabia in the sixth century.

The clearest example of Ghassanid architectural patronage is the building commissioned by Al-Mundhir at Resafa, identified by a Greek inscription proclaiming his triumph. Stylistically aligned with nearby churches and baptisteries, the structure appears to have served both religious and political functions, acting as a venue for gatherings, dispute resolution, and the public display of Jafnid authority. Its placement outside the city walls, in a liminal steppe environment near major pilgrimage routes, reflects a deliberate strategy: appropriating Roman architectural and Christian symbolism while maintaining a degree of separation from the urban imperial space. This pattern shows how the Jafnids used architecture, not to express a distinctively "Arab" style, but to negotiate power, identity, and allegiance.

== Legacy ==
The Ghassanids reached their peak under al-Harith V and al-Mundhir III. Both were militarily successful allies of the Byzantines, especially against their enemies the Lakhmids, and secured Byzantium's southern flank and its political and commercial interests in Arabia proper. On the other hand, the Ghassanids remained fervently dedicated to Miaphysitism, which brought about their break with Byzantium and Mundhir's own downfall and exile, which was followed after 586 by the dissolution of the Ghassanid federation. The Ghassanids' patronage of the Miaphysite Syrian Church was crucial for its survival and revival, and even its spread, through missionary activities, south into Arabia. According to the historian Warwick Ball, the Ghassanids' promotion of a simpler and more rigidly monotheistic form of Christianity in a specifically Arab context can be said to have anticipated Islam. Ghassanid rule also brought a period of considerable prosperity for the Arabs on the eastern fringes of Syria, as evidenced by a spread of urbanization and the sponsorship of several churches, monasteries, and other buildings. The surviving descriptions of the Ghassanid courts impart an image of luxury and an active cultural life, with patronage of the arts, music, and especially Arab-language poetry. In the words of Ball, "the Ghassanid courts were the most important centres for Arabic poetry before the rise of the Caliphal courts under Islam", and their court culture, including their penchant for desert palaces like Qasr ibn Wardan, provided the model for the Umayyad caliphs and their court.

After the fall of the first kingdom in the 7th century, several dynasties, both Christian and Muslim, claimed to be continuations of the House of Ghassan. Among these were the Nikephorian dynasty of the Byzantine Empire (802-813), the Rasulid Sultans of Yemen (1229-1424), and the Burji Mamluk Sultans of Egypt (1382-1517).

The last rulers to claim the titles of Ghassanids were the Christian Al-Chemor sheikhs in Mount Lebanon, who ruled over the small principality of Akoura (from 1211 until 1641) and Zgharta-Zwaiya (from 1643 until 1747) from Lebanon. Despite this, many other families still claim descent from the Ghassanids. A notable example is the Attieh family, which arrived in Lebanon from the Hauran between the 15th and 18th centuries. Many of them settled in the Beqaa Valley, where they still live today.

== List of kings ==
Medieval Arabic authors used the term Jafnids for the Ghassanids, a term modern scholars prefer at least for the ruling stratum of Ghassanid society. Earlier kings are traditional, actual dates highly uncertain.

1. Jafnah I ibn Amr (220–265)
2. Amr I ibn Jafnah (265–270)
3. Tha'labah ibn Amr (270–287) – Ally of Romans
4. al-Harith I ibn Tha'labah (287–307)
5. Jabalah I ibn al-Harith I (307–317)
6. al-Harith II ibn Jabalah 'ibn Maria' (317–327)
7. al-Mundhir I Senior ibn al-Harith II (327–330) with...
8. al-Ayham ibn al-Harith II (327–330) and...
9. al-Mundhir II Junior ibn al-Harith II (327–340) and...
10. al-Nu'man I ibn al-Harith II (327–342) and...
11. Amr II ibn al-Harith II (330–356) and...
12. Jabalah II ibn al-Harith II (327–361)
13. Jafnah II ibn al-Mundhir I (361–391) with...
14. al-Nu'man II ibn al-Mundhir I (361–362)
15. al-Nu'man III ibn Amr ibn al-Mundhir I (391–418)
16. Jabalah III ibn al-Nu'man (418–434)
17. al-Nu'man IV ibn al-Ayham (434–455) with...
18. al-Harith III ibn al-Ayham (434–456) and...
19. al-Nu'man V ibn al-Harith (434–453)
20. al-Mundhir II ibn al-Nu'man (453–472) with...
21. Amr III ibn al-Nu'man (453–486) and...
22. Hijr ibn al-Nu'man (453–465)
23. al-Harith IV ibn Hijr (486–512)
24. Jabalah IV ibn al-Harith (512–529)
25. al-Harith V ibn Jabalah (529–569) with...
26. Abu Karib ibn Jabalah
27. al-Mundhir III ibn al-Harith (569–581)
28. al-Nu'man VI ibn al-Mundhir (581–583)
29. Jafnah (587–591)
30. Jabalah ibn al-Ayham (632–638)

== See also ==
- Salīhids
- Rasulids

== Bibliography ==
- Athamina, Khalil (1994). "The Appointment and Dismissal of Khālid b. al-Walīd from the Supreme Command: A Study of the Political Strategy of the Early Muslim Caliphs in Syria". Arabica. 41 (2): 253–272. doi:10.1163/157005894X00191. JSTOR 4057449.
- Ball, Warwick (2000). Rome in the East: The Transformation of an Empire. London: Routledge. ISBN 0-203-02322-6.
- Bukharin, Mikhail D. (2009). "Towards the Earliest History of Kinda" (PDF). Arabian Archaeology and Epigraphy. 20 (1): 64–80. doi:10.1111/j.1600-0471.2008.00303.x.
- Crone, Patricia (1980). Slaves on Horses: The Evolution of the Islamic Polity (1980 ed.). Cambridge: Cambridge University Press. ISBN 978-0521229616.
- Cuvigny, Hélène; Robin, Christian (1996). "Des Kinaidokolpites dans un ostracon grec du désert oriental (Égypte)". Topoi. Orient-Occident. 6 (2): 697–720.
- Debie, Muriel (2024). "The Arabs and Northern Languages and Scripts before Islam". In Vacca, Alison; Borrut, Antoine; Ceballos, Manuela (eds.). Navigating Language in the Early Islamic World: Multilingualism and Language Change in the First Centuries of Islam. Brepols. pp. 195–257.
- Donner, Fred M. (1981). The Early Islamic Conquests. Princeton: Princeton University Press. ISBN 0-691-05327-8.
- Fisher, Greg (2011). Between Empires: Arabs, Romans, and Sasanians in Late Antiquity. Oxford University Press. ISBN 978-0-19-161894-9.
- Fisher, Greg (2018). "Jafnids". In Oliver Nicholson (ed.). The Oxford Dictionary of Late Antiquity. Vol. 2: J–Z. Oxford University Press. p. 804. ISBN 978-0-19-866277-8.
- Fisher, Greg (2019). Rome, Persia, and Arabia: Shaping the Middle East from Pompey to Muhammad. Routledge.
- Fowden, Elizabeth Key (1999). The Barbarian Plain: Saint Sergius Between Rome and Iran. Berkeley and Los Angeles: University of California Press. ISBN 0-520-21685-7.
- Greatrex, Geoffrey; Lieu, Samuel N. C. (2002). The Roman Eastern Frontier and the Persian Wars (Part II, 363–630 AD). London: Routledge. ISBN 0-415-14687-9.
- Kennedy, Hugh (2010). "Syrian Elites from Byzantium to Islam: Survival or Extinction?". In Haldon, John (ed.). Money, Power and Politics in Early Islamic Syria: A Review of Current Debates. Farnham and Burlington: Ashgate. pp. 181–199. ISBN 9780754668497.
- Khalek, Nancy (2011). Damascus after the Muslim Conquest: Text and Image in Early Islam. New York: Oxford University Press. ISBN 978-0-19-973651-5.
- Madelung, Wilferd (2000). "Abūʾl-Amayṭar al-Sufyānī". Jerusalem Studies in Arabic and Islam. 24: 327–341.
- Millar, Fergus: "Rome's 'Arab' Allies in Late Antiquity". In: Henning Börm - Josef Wiesehöfer (eds.), Commutatio et Contentio. Studies in the Late Roman, Sasanian, and Early Islamic Near East. Wellem Verlag, Düsseldorf 2010, pp. 159–186.
- Rihan, Mohammed (2014). The Politics and Culture of an Umayyad Tribe: Conflict and Factionalism in the Early Islamic Period. Bloomsbury.
- Robin, Christian J. (2015). "Ghassān en Arabie". In Genequand, Denis; Robin, Christian J. (eds.). Les Jafnides, rois arabes au service de Byzance (VIe siècle de l'ère chrétienne). De Boccard. pp. 79–120.
- Shahîd, Irfan (1965). "Ghassān". In Lewis, B.; Pellat, Ch. & Schacht, J. (eds.). The Encyclopaedia of Islam, Second Edition. Volume II: C–G. Leiden: E. J. Brill. pp. 462–463. OCLC 495469475.
- Shahîd, Irfan (1991). "Ghassānids". In Kazhdan, Alexander (ed.). The Oxford Dictionary of Byzantium. Oxford and New York: Oxford University Press. ISBN 0-19-504652-8.
- Shahid, Irfan (1995). Byzantium and the Arabs in the Sixth Century: Volume I: Part 1: Political and Military History. Washington, DC: Dumbarton Oaks.
- Shahid, Irfan (2002). Byzantium and the Arabs in the Sixth Century, Volume 2, Part 1, Toponymy, Monuments, Historical Geography, and Frontier Studies. Dumbarton Oaks.
- Shahid, Irfan (2010). Byzantium and the Arabs in the Sixth Century, Volume 2, Part 2: Economic, Social, and Cultural History. Dumbarton Oaks.
- Ulrich, Brian (2019). Arabs in the Early Islamic Empire: Exploring al-Azd Tribal Identity. Edinburgh: Edinburgh University Press. ISBN 978-1-4744-3682-3.
