= Al-Nu'man VI ibn al-Mundhir =

King of the Arab Ghassanids from 581 to 583

- Reign: 581–583
- Predecessor: al-Mundhir III ibn al-Harith
- Successor: Office abolished

Al-Nuʿmān ibn al-Mundhir (Arabic: النعمان بن المنذر), known in Byzantine sources as Naamanes (Greek: Νααμάνης) was a king of the Ghassanids, a Christian Arab tribe allied to the Byzantine Empire. The eldest son of al-Mundhir III ibn al-Harith, he rose in revolt with his tribe after his father was treacherously arrested by the Byzantines in 581. After two years of revolt, seeking to reconcile himself with the Empire, he visited the new emperor, Maurice (r. 582–602), at Constantinople. Refusing to renounce his Monophysite faith, he was arrested and exiled to Sicily, where his father had been banned earlier. This event marked the end of the Ghassanid control over the Byzantines' Arab foederati and the fragmentation of this strong buffer against invasions from the Bedouin tribes of the desert.

== Sources ==
- Greatrex, Geoffrey; Lieu, Samuel N. C. (2002), The Roman Eastern Frontier and the Persian Wars (Part II, 363–630 AD), Routledge, ISBN 0-415-14687-9
- Kazhdan, Alexander, ed. (1991), Oxford Dictionary of Byzantium, Oxford University Press, ISBN 978-0-19-504652-6
- Martindale, John R., ed. (1992). The Prosopography of the Later Roman Empire: Volume III, AD 527–641. Cambridge: Cambridge University Press. ISBN 0-521-20160-8.
- Shahîd, Irfan (1995). Byzantium and the Arabs in the sixth century, Volume 1. Dumbarton Oaks. ISBN 978-0-88402-214-5.
