= Jaffna Diocese =

Diocese of Jaffna or Jaffna Diocesemay refer to:

- the Catholic Diocese of Jaffna
- the Jaffna Diocese of the Church of South India
