= Jafnah ibn Amr =

First of the Ghassanid kings

- King of the Ghassanids
- Reign: 220–265 CE
- Predecessor: Position started
- Successor: Amr ibn Jafnah
- Died: c. 265 CE
- House: Ghassanids
- Father: Muzayqiya
- Religion: South Arabian polytheism (possibly)

Jafnah ibn 'Amr (Arabic: جفنة بن عمرو) or Jafna (died c. 265 CE) was the first of the Ghassanid rulers. He was succeeded by his son Amr ibn Jafnah who converted to Christianity.

== Biography ==
=== Family ===
Jafnah is the son of the ancient Arabian king, Muzayqiya. His full lineage is given as Jafnah ibn 'Amr Muzayqiya ibn 'Amir Ma' as-Sama ibn Haritha ibn Imru' al-Qays ibn Tha'laba ibn Mazin ibn 'Azd, connecting his lineage to the historic Azd tribal group. Jafnah had a brother named Tha'laba ibn 'Amr who would be the ancestor of the Aws and Khazraj tribes which dominated the Arabian city of Medina.

Jafnah's son, 'Amr, became a Christian, and from there began the status of the Ghassanids as a Christian tribe and ruling dynasty.

=== Rule ===
The reign of Jafnah ibn 'Amr has been dated to 220–265 CE, somewhere in the 3rd century CE. Towards the end of this reign around 250 CE, Jafnah and his family may have migrated to Syria from Yemen as a result of the collapse of the Ma'rib Dam.

== Legacy ==
Jafnah was the ancestor of the Ghassanid line of rulers. In later years, the Ghassanid rulers would become powerful allies of the Byzantines. Even after the decline of the Ghassanids in the 7th century CE, Christian and even Muslim ruling dynasties would claim to be descended from Jafnah. Muslim dynasties who did such include the Rasulid dynasty (1229–1454) and also some of the sultans that were part of the Burji Mamluks.

== See also ==
- Ghassanids
- Rasulids
