= Little Jaffna =

Little Jaffna may refer to:

- Wellawatte, Sri Lanka
- Brickfields, Kuala Lumpur, Malaysia
- Quartier de La Chapelle, France
- East Ham, Britain
- Scarborough—Rouge River, Canada

== See also ==
- Jaffna
