= Al-Mundhir III ibn al-Harith =

King of the Ghassanid Arabs from 569 to 581

- King of the Ghassanids, Roman Patrician and Phylarch of the Saracens
- Reign: 569–581
- Predecessor: Al-Harith V
- Successor: Unnamed brother (Byzantine candidate); Al-Numan VI (de facto)
- Died: after 602
- Father: Al-Harith V

Al-Mundhir ibn al-Ḥārith (المنذر بن الحارث), known in Byzantine sources as Flavios Alamoundaros (Φλάβιος Ἀλαμούνδαρος), was the king of the Ghassanid Arabs from 569 to circa 581. A son of al-Harith ibn Jabalah, he succeeded his father both in the kingship over his tribe and as the chief of the Byzantine Empire's Arab clients and allies in the East, with the rank of patricius. Despite his victories over the rival Persian-backed Lakhmids, throughout Mundhir's reign his relations with Byzantium were lukewarm due to his staunch Miaphysitism. This led to a complete breakdown of the alliance in 572, after Mundhir discovered Byzantine plans to assassinate him. Relations were restored in 575 and Mundhir secured from the Byzantine emperor both recognition of his royal status and a pledge of tolerance towards the Miaphysite Church.

In 580 or 581, Mundhir participated in an unsuccessful campaign against the Persian capital, Ctesiphon, alongside the Byzantine general (and future emperor) Maurice. The failure of the campaign led to a quarrel between the two and Maurice accused Mundhir of treason. Byzantine agents captured Mundhir, who was brought to Constantinople but never faced trial. His arrest provoked an uprising among the Ghassanids under Mundhir's son al-Nu'man VI. When Maurice ascended the throne in 582, Mundhir was exiled to Sicily although, according to one source, he was allowed to return to his homeland after Maurice's overthrow in 602.

Mundhir was the last important Ghassanid ruler; in 584, the Byzantines would break up the Ghassanid federation. A capable and successful military leader, his rule also saw the strengthening of Miaphysitism and a cultural flowering among the Arabs under his rule.

== Biography ==
=== Succession and early career ===
Mundhir was the son of al-Harith ibn Jabalah, ruler of the Ghassanid tribe and supreme phylarch of the Arab foederati in the eastern frontier of the Byzantine Empire. Situated on the southern flank of the frontier, the Ghassanids faced the Lakhmids, another powerful Arab tribe who were in turn the chief client of Byzantium's main antagonist, the Sassanid Persian Empire. Harith had been raised to the kingship and to the position of supreme phylarch by the Byzantine emperor Justinian I (r. 527–565), who wished thereby to create a strong counterpart to the Lakhmid rulers. Mundhir had been confirmed as his father's heir as early as 563, during the latter's visit to Constantinople, and succeeded after Harith's death in 569. It appears that Mundhir inherited his father's Byzantine titles one at a time, as they were not hereditary: the rank of patricius, the honorific appellation paneuphemos (most honorable) and the prestigious honorific gentilicium "Flavius", borne by the Byzantine emperors and consuls.

Soon after Harith's death, Ghassanid territory was attacked by Qabus ibn al-Mundhir, the new Lakhmid ruler, who sought to take advantage of the situation. Qabus's forces were repulsed and Mundhir invaded Lakhmid territory in turn, seizing much plunder. As he turned back, the Lakhmids again confronted the Ghassanid army, but suffered a heavy defeat. After this success, Mundhir wrote to the Byzantine emperor Justin II (r. 565–578) asking for gold for his men. This request reportedly angered Justin, who sent instructions to his local commander to lure the Ghassanid ruler into a trap and have him killed. But the letter fell into Mundhir's hands, who then severed his relations with the Empire and refused to commit his forces during the war with Persia that began in 572.

=== Return to Byzantine allegiance ===
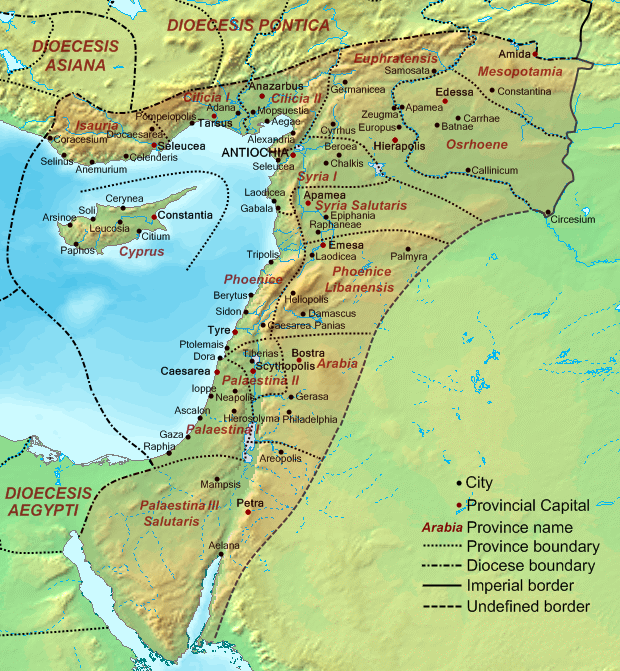
The Byzantine Diocese of the East, where the Ghassanids were active.

As the Byzantines relied upon the Ghassanids to cover the approaches to Syria, Mundhir's withdrawal left a gap in the Byzantine southern flank, which persisted for three years until 575 when Mundhir returned to the Byzantine allegiance through the mediation of the general Justinian, who met Mundhir at Sergiopolis. Immediately after this reconciliation, Mundhir assembled an army in secret and launched an attack against Hirah, the Lakhmid capital, arguably the Arab world's largest, richest, and most culturally vibrant city at the time. The city was sacked, plundered, and put to the torch, except for the churches. According to John of Ephesus, Mundhir donated much of his booty from this expedition to monasteries and the poor. The same year, Mundhir visited Constantinople, where he was awarded a crown or diadem (stemma), marking the formal renewal of his role as Byzantium's chief Arab client-king.

The war with Persia was interrupted by a three-year truce agreed in 575. In 578, hostilities were renewed, but the sources on the period, fragmentary as they are, do not mention any Ghassanid participation for the first two years. In 580, Mundhir was invited by Emperor Tiberius II (r. 578–582) to visit the capital again. He arrived in the city on 8 February, accompanied by two of his sons, and was lavishly received. On this occasion, among a multitude of other gifts, he was also presented with a royal crown, instead of the simpler coronet or diadem he had been awarded before.

While at Constantinople, Mundhir received permission from the emperor to hold a Miaphysite church council, which convened on 2 March 580. This council managed, albeit for a brief time, to reconcile the various factions and sects of the Monophysites. It was a goal towards which Mundhir had long striven, as when he intervened in the quarrel between Jacob Baradaeus and Paul the Black, the Miaphysite patriarch of Antioch. Before leaving the imperial capital, the Ghassanid ruler also secured a pledge from the emperor that the persecutions of the Monophysites would cease. When he returned home, Mundhir discovered that the Lakhmids and Persians had used his absence to raid his domains. Gathering his forces, he fell upon their army, defeated them, and returned home laden with booty.

In the summer of 580 or 581, Mundhir went to Circesium on the river Euphrates, where he joined the Byzantine forces under the new magister militum per Orientem, Maurice, for a campaign deep into Persian territory. The combined force moved south along the river, accompanied by a fleet of ships. The allied army stormed the fortress of Anatha and moved on until it reached the region of Beth Aramaye in central Mesopotamia, near the Persian capital of Ctesiphon, but there they found the bridge over the Euphrates destroyed by the Persians. With any possibility of a march to Ctesiphon gone, they were forced to retreat, especially since at the same time the Persian commander Adarmahan had taken advantage of the Byzantine army's absence and was raiding freely in Osroene, where he sacked the provincial capital Edessa. The retreat was arduous for the exhausted army, and Maurice and Mundhir exchanged recriminations for the expedition's failure. Mundhir and Maurice cooperated however in forcing Adarmahan to withdraw, and defeated him at Callinicum. Upon returning to his lands, Mundhir learned that a combined Persian-Lakhmid force was preparing another attack against the Ghassanid realm. Immediately he set out to meet them, engaged their army and comprehensively defeated it, before going on to capture the enemy camp. It was to be his last victory.

=== Arrest and exile ===
Despite his successes, Mundhir was accused by Maurice of treason during the preceding campaign. Maurice claimed that Mundhir had revealed the Byzantine plan to the Persians, who then proceeded to destroy the bridge over the Euphrates. The chronicler John of Ephesus explicitly calls this assertion a lie, as the Byzantine intentions must have been plain to the Persian commanders. Both Maurice and Mundhir wrote letters to Emperor Tiberius, who tried to reconcile them. Finally, Maurice himself visited Constantinople, where he was able to persuade Tiberius of Mundhir's guilt. The charge of treason is almost universally dismissed by modern historians; Irfan Shahîd says that it probably had more to do with Maurice's dislike of the veteran and militarily successful Arab ruler. This was further compounded by the Byzantines' habitual distrust of the "barbarian" and supposedly innately traitorous Arabs, as well as by Mundhir's staunchly Monophysite faith.

Tiberius ordered Mundhir's arrest, and a trap was laid for the Ghassanid king: summoned to Constantinople to answer charges of treason, Mundhir chose his friend, the curator Magnus, as his advocate. Magnus was probably a Byzantine, hailing from Huwwarin (Evaria). There he had built a church, and he now called on Mundhir to join him and the patriarch of Antioch Gregory in the dedication ceremony. Mundhir arrived with only a small escort and was arrested by Byzantine troops stationed in secret at the location. He was transported to Constantinople, joined along the way by his wife, the Hujrid princess Hind, and three of his children. At the capital, he was treated well by Tiberius, who allowed him a comfortable residence and a subsidy, but denied him an audience. Irfan Shahîd believes that this generous treatment, as well as the fact that he was not brought to trial for his supposed treason, indicate that Tiberius too did not believe the charges, but ordered the arrest chiefly to placate the strong anti-Monophysite faction in the imperial capital.

In the meantime, Mundhir's arrest provoked a revolt led by his four sons, especially the eldest, Nu'man, a man described by John of Ephesus as even more capable and warlike than his father. For two years, the Ghassanid army launched raids into the Byzantine provinces from their bases in the desert, even defeating and killing the Byzantine dux of Arabia in a battle at Bostra. Tiberius reacted by raising a Chalcedonian brother of Mundhir to the Ghassanid kingship. A large army with Magnus at its head was dispatched east to counter Nu'man and install his uncle as king. The latter was swiftly done, but the new king died after only twenty days. Magnus also had some success in subduing or subverting the allegiance of some minor Arab tribes away from the Ghassanids. Magnus died shortly before Tiberius's own death in August 582, and with Maurice's accession to the throne, Nu'man journeyed to Constantinople to achieve a reconciliation with Byzantium. Instead, he too was arrested, tried, and sentenced to death, quickly commuted to house arrest.

Mundhir remained in Constantinople until the death of Tiberius and the accession of Maurice, when he was exiled to Sicily. It is likely that he is the man Pope Gregory the Great mentioned as "Anamundarus" in 600, indicating that he was still alive at the time. A 13th-century Syriac chronicle further records that after Maurice's overthrow and murder in 602, Mundhir was allowed to return home.

=== Legacy ===
Mundhir in many ways continued in the footsteps of his father. He was a militarily successful ally of the Byzantines, especially against his fellow Arabs, the Lakhmid tribesmen, and secured Byzantium's southern flank and its political and commercial interests in Arabia proper. Despite his fervent dedication to Monophysitism, he remained loyal to Byzantium as the Christian state par excellence; as Irfan Shahîd comments, Mundhir's self-image may well have been that of a "sixth-century Odenathus fighting for the Christian Roman Empire, as his third-century predecessor had done for the pagan empire". Yet, in the end, his independent character and his role as the protector of the Monophysite Church led to his downfall and exile. In the overwhelmingly pro-Chalcedonian atmosphere of Tiberius's and Maurice's reigns, unlike his father Harith, who was protected by Empress Theodora's Monophysite leanings, Mundhir could not count on any influential support in Constantinople. Mundhir's arrest was followed after 584 by the dissolution of the Ghassanid federation into a number of smaller chiefdoms. This was a momentous event in the history of Byzantine-Arab relations: it destroyed Byzantium's "protective shield" against incursions from the Arabian desert, an error for which the Byzantines would pay dearly with the onset of the Muslim conquests. It was paralleled a few years later by the destruction of the Lakhmid kingdom at the hands of the Persians, opening a power vacuum in northern Arabia which the nascent Muslim state would later fill. On the other hand, the Muslim conquests, and before them the destructive thirty-year war with Persia, were still a long way off in 584, and the dissolution of the Ghassanid federation may be seen simply, according to the historian Michael Whitby, as the elimination of an "over-successful quasi-client neighbour", who threatened to become "too powerful for the good of its supposed patron".

The Ghassanids left an important cultural legacy as well. Their patronage of the Monophysite Syrian Church was crucial for its survival and revival, and even its spread, through missionary activities, south into Arabia. According to the historian Warwick Ball, the Ghassanids' promotion of a simpler and more rigidly monotheistic form of Christianity in a specifically Arab context can be said to have anticipated Islam. Ghassanid rule also brought a period of considerable prosperity for the Arabs on the eastern fringes of Syria, as evidenced by a spread of urbanization and the sponsorship of several churches, monasteries and other buildings. The surviving descriptions of the Ghassanid courts impart an image of luxury and an active cultural life, with patronage of the arts, music and especially Arab-language poetry. In the words of Ball, "the Ghassanid courts were the most important centres for Arabic poetry before the rise of the Caliphal courts under Islam", and their court culture, including their penchant for desert palaces like Qasr ibn Wardan, provided the model for the Umayyad caliphs and their court. Among the architectural remains from Mundhir's own reign are the castle of Dumayr and the so-called ecclesia extra muros (nowadays identified as Mundhir's own audience hall or praetorium) in Sergiopolis, where an inscription in Greek, celebrating Mundhir, survives. Sergiopolis (modern Rusafa) was a site of particular significance due to the popularity of the cult of Saint Sergius among the Arabs, and was also a focus of later Umayyad building activity.
