= The Jaffna (aircraft) =

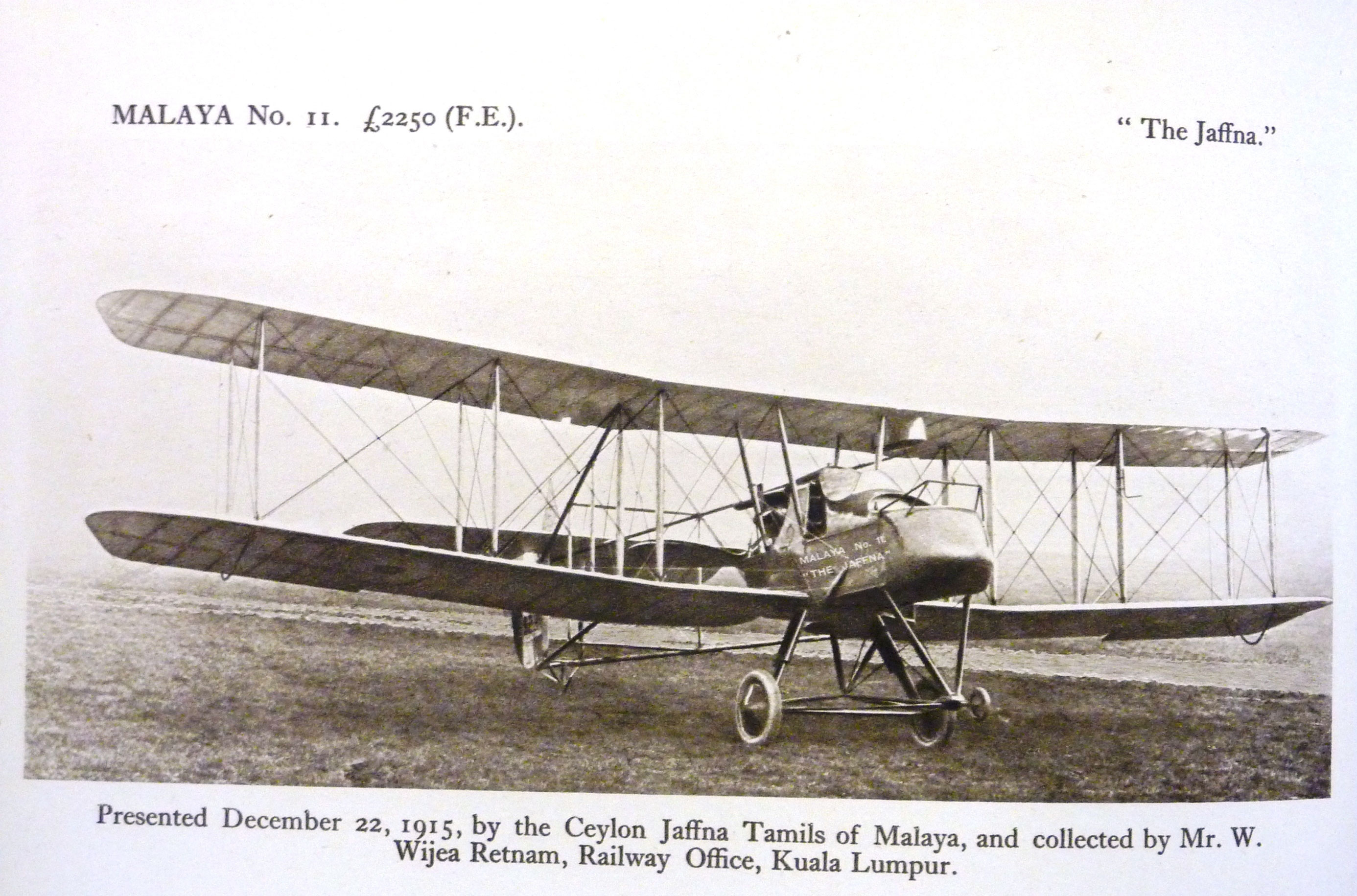
- The Jaffna

General information
- Type: Royal Aircraft Factory F.E.2b
- Manufacturer: Royal Aircraft Factory
- Status: Unknown
- Owners: Royal Flying Corps
- Serial: MALAYA No. 11 (Fighter) "The Jaffna"

History
- First flight: Unknown
- In service: December 1915
- Last flight: Unknown

The Jaffna (MALAYA No. 11 (Fighter) The Jaffna) was a Royal Aircraft Factory F.E.2 aircraft of the Royal Flying Corps. It was given to the British Government during World War I by Ceylonese Tamils who had emigrated from Jaffna to Malaya, on 22 December 1915. The Jaffna was allocated to No. 25 Squadron.

The aircraft is considered as one of Sri Lanka's aviation historical fact and example of patriotism.
