= Athanasius (grandson of Theodora) =

Athanasius was a Byzantine monk and a grandson of Theodora, wife of Justinian I. The main sources about him are John of Ephesus, Michael the Syrian and Bar-Hebraeus.

== Biography ==
Athanasius was son to an unnamed daughter of Theodora, wife of Justinian I. John of Ephesus first mentions him as "Athanasius, the son of queen Theodora's daughter". He received a religious education, his mentors being Amantius and Sergius of Tella. The former was a monk from Edessa, the latter served as a Syriac Patriarch of Antioch from 544 to 546. Both mentors were Monophysites.

Athanasius later became a Tritheite and a disciple of John Asconaghes. R. Payne Smith explains the origins of their belief system and Athanasius' affiliation to it:"This Philoponus, called also John Grammaticus, a very learned Aristotelian of Alexandria, is generally looked upon as their founder, but really he only defended their heresy, by an argument deduced from an exposition of what 'substance' is, according to the doctrines of his great master, Aristotle. Their real founder was a certain obscure John Ascunages, whose creed is preserved by Bar-Hebraeus: 'I acknowledge one nature of Christ the Incarnate Word, but in the Trinity I reckon the natures and substances and Godheads according to the number of the persons.' But for the learning of Philoponus the sect would probably have expired with its founder; but an adventitious importance was further given to it by its being joined by "Athanasius, the son of Theodora's daughter, whose great wealth was freely expended in obtaining converts."

Athanasius became a monk at some point. In 566, Pope Theodosius I of Alexandria died. Athanasius the Monk was a candidate for the vacant throne. He was apparently a failed candidate for the Coptic Papacy.

A new heresy that arose at the time denied the resurrection of the physical body. John of Ephesus asserts that Athanasius supported this view. John also ascertains that Patriarch Eutychius of Constantinople followed this belief in his second term (577-582). He explains what this Patriarch supported: "These bodies of men do not attain to the resurrection, but others are created anew, which arise in their stead."

Athanasius is recorded spending gold to spread this belief: "The great difficulty which they found in propagating their audacious and polluted heresy was the want of bishops. For at first there were but two, namely, Conon himself, the head of the schism, and Eugenius, both bishops of towns in Cilicia. When, however, their views became known there, they were greatly blamed by many of their compeers, and admonished: and upon their refusal to withdraw them, the sentence of deposition was passed upon them: upon which, they and Athanasius, the son of queen Theodora's daughter, "who increased and multiplied the heresy by a liberal expenditure of gold", took measures in concert for obtaining a third bishop according to the canon."

Athanasius left a will. According to its terms Justin II (reigned 565-578) and empress Sophia were his chief heirs. The slaves in his possession would become freedmen, each receiving a small inheritance from their master. Various small bequest would pass to various friends. But Conon would receive "the sum of ten pounds of gold immediately and an annuity of two pounds of gold for life".

But Athanasius and Conon had a severe argument and mutually excommunicated each other. Athanasius considered changing his will. But death prevented him from doing so. John records:"Athanasius purposed to change his will, and exclude Conon from it, but died suddenly: and when his will was opened, Conon took what was written in it, while still excommunicating him who had left him the money."

== Sources ==
- Martindale, John R., ed. (1992). The Prosopography of the Later Roman Empire: Volume III, AD 527–641. Cambridge: Cambridge University Press. ISBN 0-521-20160-8.
- Payne Smith, R.; John of Ephesus (1860), Ecclesiastical History, Part 3. A New Translation from the Greek, Oxford University Press
