= Tritheism =

Religious view

Tritheism (from Greek τριθεΐα, "three divinity") is a polytheistic nontrinitarian Christian conception of God in which the unity of the Trinity and, by extension, monotheism are denied. "Tritheism" may also be used as a polemical label for models of Christology by opposing individuals or groups.

== Theology ==
Tritheism asserts that, rather than being single God of three eternally consubstantial Persons, the Father, Son (Jesus), and Holy Spirit are three ontologically separate Gods. It represents more of a "possible deviation" than any actual school of thought positing three separate deities. It was usually "little more than a hostile label" applied to those who emphasized the individuality of each hypostasis or divine person—Father, Son and Holy Spirit—over the unity of the Trinity as a whole.

== History ==
=== Late antiquity ===
The accusation was especially popular between the 3rd and 7th centuries AD. In the history of Christianity, various theologians have been accused of lapsing into tritheism. Among the earliest were the monophysites John Philoponos (died c. 570) and his followers, such as Eugenius and Conon of Tarsus. They taught that the common nature of the Trinity is an abstraction; so that, while the three persons are consubstantial, they are distinct in their properties. Their view was an attempt to reconcile Aristotle with Christianity. This view, which was defended by Patriarch Peter III of Callinicum during a series of church councils and disputes arbitrated by the Ghassanid phylarch Jafnah, was condemned as tritheism at a synod in Alexandria in 616. It was again condemned as tritheism at the Third Council of Constantinople in 680–81.

In Late Antiquity, several heretical movements criticized Trinitarianism as equivalent to tritheism. The Sabellians, Monarchians and Pneumatomachoi labelled their opponents as tritheists. Jews and Muslims also frequently criticized Trinitarianism as merely dressed-up tritheism. Groups accused by Chalcedonians of tritheism include the Anomoeans and Nestorians.

=== Middle Ages ===
In the Middle Ages, the scholastic Roscelin was accused of tritheism. He was an extreme nominalist who saw the three divine persons as separately existing. He was condemned as a tritheist at the synod of Soissons in roughly 1092. The realist scholastic Gilbert de la Porrée went in the opposite direction by distinguishing between three divine beings and the essence of God (making a quaternity rather than a trinity), and was accused of tritheism. He was condemned at the Council of Reims in 1148. Gilbert's ideas influenced Joachim of Fiore, and the Fourth Lateran Council (1215) tried to clarify the issue by confirming the numerical unity of the Trinity.

=== Modernity ===
In modern times, the Austrian Catholic Anton Günther, in an effort to refute Hegelian pantheism, declared three divine persons to be three absolute and distinct realities bound together only by their shared origin.

== List of Christians accused of tritheism ==
1. Those who are usually meant by the name were a section of the Monophysites, who had great influence in the second half of the sixth century, but have left no traces save a few scanty notices in John of Ephesus, Photius, Leontius etc. Their founder is said to be a certain John Ascunages, head of a Sophist school at Antioch. The principal writer was John Philoponus, the great Aristotelian commentator; the leaders were two bishops, Conon of Tarsus and Eugenius of Seleucia in Isauria, who were deposed by their comprovincials and took refuge at Constantinople where they found a powerful convert and protector in Athanasius the Monk, a grandson of the Empress Theodora. Philoponus dedicated to him a book on the Trinity. The old philosopher pleaded his infirmities when he was summoned by the Emperor Justinian to the Court to give an account of his teaching. But Conon and Eugenius had to dispute in the reign of Justin II (565-78) in the presence of the Catholic patriarch John Scholasticus (565-77), with two champions of the moderate Monophysite party, Stephen and Paul, the latter afterward Patriarch of Antioch. The Tritheist bishops refused to anathematize Philoponus, and brought proofs that he agreed with Severus and Theodosius. They were banished to Palestine, and Philoponus wrote a book against John Scholasticus, who had given his verdict in favour of his adversaries. But he developed a theory of his own as to the Resurrection (see Eutychianism) on account of which Conon and Eugenius wrote a treatise against him in collaboration with Themistus, the founder of the Agnoctae, in which they declared his views to be altogether unchristian. These two bishops and a deprived bishop named Theonas proceeded to consecrate bishops for their sect, which they established in Corinth and Athens, Rome, Northern Africa and the Western Patriarchate, while in the east agents traveled through Syria and Cilicia, Isauria and Cappadocia, converting whole districts and ordaining priests and deacons in cities villages and monasteries. Eugenius died in Pamphylia; Conon returned to Constantinople. Leontius assures that the Aristotelianism of Philoponus made him teach that there are in the Holy Trinity three partial substances (merikai ousiai, ikikai theotetes, idiai physeis) and one common. The genesis of the doctrine has been explained (for the first time) under MONOPHYSITES, where an account of Philoponus's writings and those of Stephen Gobarus, another member of the sect, will be found.
2. John Philoponus, an Aristotelian and monophysite in Alexandria about the middle of the sixth century, was charged with tritheism because he saw in the Trinity as separated three natures, substances and deities, according to the number of divine persons. He sought to justify this view by the Aristotelian categories of genus, species and individuum.
3. In the Middle Ages, Roscellin of Compiegne, the founder of Nominalism, argued like Philoponus that unless the Three Persons are tres res (3 objects), the whole Trinity must have been incarnate. He was condemned of the heresy of tritheism at the 1092-1093 Council of Soissons presided over by Renaud du Bellay, archbishop of Rheims. Attempting to appeal to the authority of Lanfranc and Anselm, Roscellin prompted Anselm to write Cur Deus Homo and other treatments of the divine nature refuting his treatment. Roscellin publicly recanted and, after exile in England and Italy, reconciled himself to the church, but returned to a form of his earlier reasoning.
4. Among Catholic writers, Pierre Faydit, who was expelled from the Oratory at Paris in 1671 for disobedience and died in 1709, practiced a form of tritheism in his Eclaireissements sur la doctrine et Phistoire ecclésiastiqes des deux premiers siecles (Paris, 1696), in which he tried to make out that the earliest Fathers were Tritheists. He was replied to by the Premonstratensian Abbot Louis-Charles Hugo (Apologie du système des Saints Pères sur la Trinité, Luxemburg, 1699).
5. A prominent ideologue of Russian Old Believers and a writer, Avvakum (died 1682) was accused by official Orthodox Church and by fellow Old Believers of tritheism, based on some passages in his letters.
6. A Catholic canon of Trier named Oembs, influenced by the doctrines of the "Enlightenment", similarly attributed to the Fathers his own view of three similar natures in the Trinity, calling the numerical unity of God an invention of the Scholastics. His book Opuscula de Deo Uno et Trino (Mainz, 1789), was condemned by Pius VII in a Brief of 14 July 1804.
7. The Bohemian Jesuit philosopher Anton Günther was also accused of tritheism, leading to his work ending up on the Index librorum.
8. Among Protestants, Heinrich Nicolai (d. 1660), a professor at Danzig and at Elbing (not to be confounded with the founder of Familia Caritatis), is cited.
9. The best known in the Anglican Church is William Sherlock, Dean of St. Paul's, whose Vindication of the Doctrine of the Holy and ever Blessed Trinity (London, 1690) against the Socinians, maintaining that with the exception of a mutual consciousness of each other, which no created spirits can have, the three divine persons are "three distinct infinite minds" or "three intelligent beings.", was attacked by Robert South in Animadversions on Dr. Sherlock's Vindication (1693). Sherlock's work is said to have made William Manning a Socinian and Thomas Emlyn an Arian, and the dispute was ridiculed in a skit entitled "The Battle Royal", attributed to William Pittis (1694?), which was translated into Latin at Cambridge.
10. Joseph Bingham, author of the "Antiquities", preached at Oxford in 1695 a sermon which was considered to represent the Fathers as tritheists, and it was condemned by the Hebdomadal Council as falsa, impia et haeretica, the scholar being driven from Oxford.
11. Though members of the Church of Jesus Christ of Latter-day Saints would probably not self-identify as tritheist, some critics of Mormonism say that it is tritheistic or polytheistic because it teaches that the Godhead is a council of three distinct deities perfectly one in purpose, unity, and mission, but nevertheless separate and distinct beings.
12. Some have suggested that the Seventh-day Adventist Church has embraced a tritheistic view of the Father, Son, and Holy Spirit as it does not see their singularity as a Godhead consisting in one being but rather as three separate beings in a single group.

== See also ==
- Triple deity
- Triple Goddess (Neopaganism)
