= Muzayqiya =

Ancient Arab king

- King of Kahlan
- Reign: c. 68–158 CE
- Predecessor: Imran ibn 'Amr
- Died: c. 158 CE; Tihama region of Yemen
- House: Kahlan, Azd
- Father: 'Amir Ma' as-Sama
- Religion: South Arabian polytheism

Muzayqiya (Arabic: مزيقياء) was the leader of the Azd tribes and a king ruling parts of Yemen in the 2nd century CE. Muzayqiya succeeded his brother Imran in the leadership of the kingdom. During his time, the Ma'rib Dam collapsed which resulted in several Qahtanite tribes emigrating from Yemen.

== Biography ==
=== Family ===
Muzayqiya's real name was 'Amr, and his father was the patriarch 'Amir Ma' as-Sama. He also had a brother named Imran, whom he succeeded in leadership of Kahlan. Muzayqiya had several sons including Jafnah, Tha'laba and Haritha.

His full lineage, according to Ibn Qutaybah is 'Amr ibn 'Amir ibn Haritha ibn Imru' al-Qays ibn Tha'laba ibn Mazin ibn 'Abd Allah ibn 'Azd; tracing his genealogy back to that of the Azd tribe. Hisham ibn al-Kalbi extended his lineage further and indicated he was from the Kahlan tribe as well as a descendant of ancient Arabian patriarch Qahtan.

The descendants of Muzayqiya, from each of his sons, include:

- From Jafnah – The Ghassanids
- From Tha'laba – The Aws and Khazraj tribes
- From Haritha – The Banu Khuza'ah and Bariq tribes

=== Rule ===
The rule of Muzayqiya has been dated to the 2nd century CE. He became ruler after his brother, the priest-king Imran ibn 'Amir, had died. The early years of his rule were prosperous, especially for agriculture; the gardens underneath the Ma'rib Dam were full of trees which produced an abundance of fruit for the population. However, in the final years of his reign, the Ma'rib Dam became neglected and then collapsed, resulting in several of the Qahtanite tribes evacuating from Yemen, and emigrating to other places in the Arabian Peninsula or the Levantine regions.

A map of Yemen, with the red highlighted part being the land of the Akk, where Muzayqiya emigrated to

Muzayqiya himself emigrated to the land of the Akk tribe (now the Tihama Region) with some his family and people, where he fell ill and died.

== Historicity ==
The Arab poet and Sahaba, Hassan ibn Thabit, is quoted as saying; "Yemen calls us to Saba' and we respond to it, and we are the kings of the people since the time of Tubba', when the kingdom was in the sons of 'Amr (referring to Muzayqiya)." This is supported by historical inscriptions, for example the Sabaean king Ilīsharaḥ Yaḥḍub is recorded as having sent a delegation to a certain king of Ghassan and Azd. This might have referred to the sons of Muzayqiya who ruled other parts of Yemen except for the territory of Saba' itself.

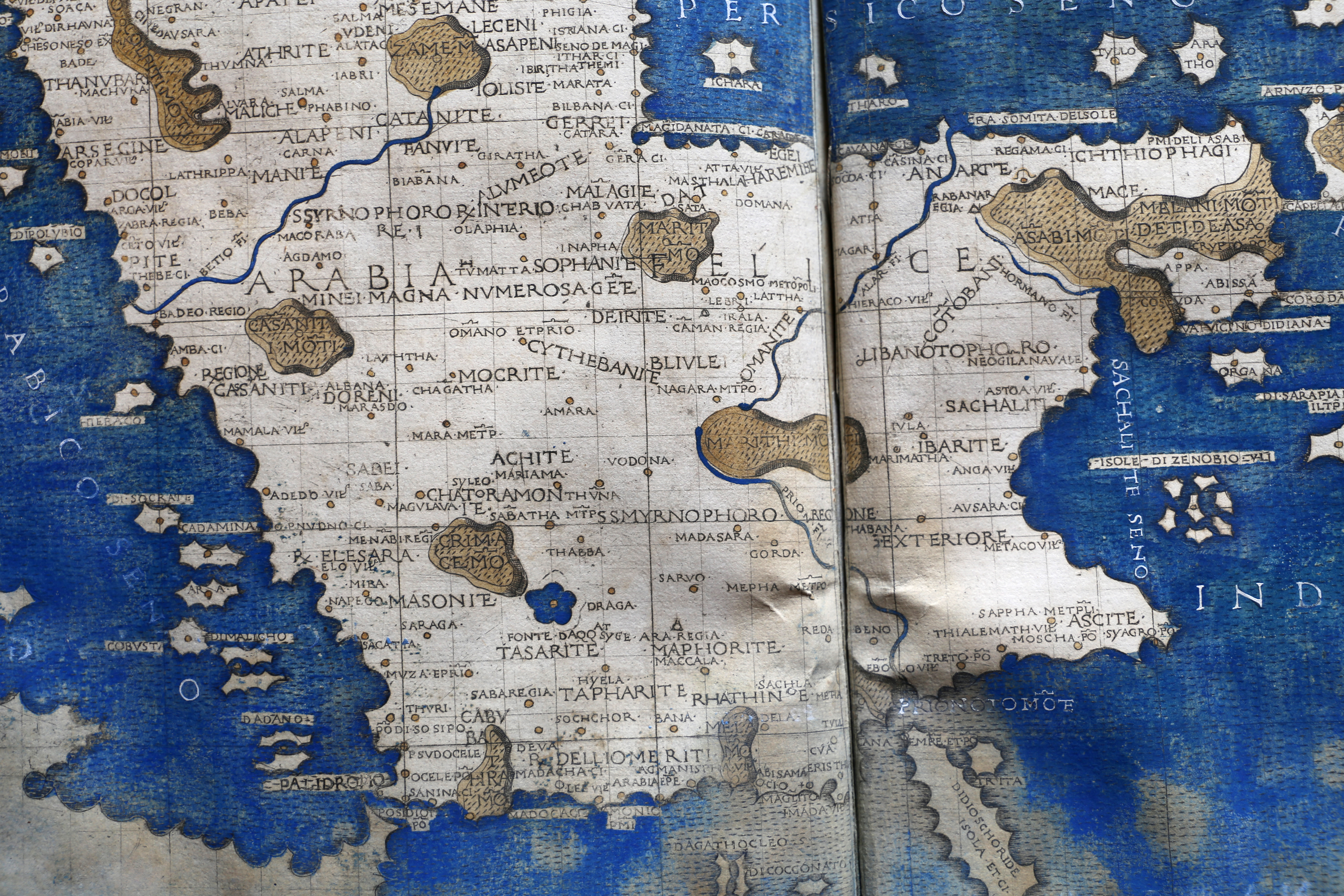
Map of the Arabian Peninsula by Francesco Berlinghieri, based on Ptolemy's work. The Ghassanids are seen in the western part of the peninsula; under the name Casaniti.

Evidence for the mass emigration from Yemen has been found as well. Ibn Abd Rabbih narrated that the Ghassanids, including Jafnah ibn Amr, received the name "Ghassan" due to an abundant water source near the place they emigrated to. Ptolemy identifies the Ghassanids as living at a place not far from the mouth of a river that is connected to the ocean.

The collapse of the Ma'rib Dam is documented in several inscriptions from the reign of Dhamar Ali Yahbur in the 2nd century CE. A second collapse of the dam is mentioned during the reign of the Himyarite king Sharhabil Ya'fur in 454 CE.

== See also ==
- Ghassanids
- Aws
- Khazraj
- List of rulers of Saba' and Himyar
