= Pauline Allen =

Australian scholar of early Christianity

Pauline Allen, FAHA, FBA (born 23 February 1948) is an Australian scholar of early Christianity. She is Research Professor of Early Christian Studies and the Director of the Centre for Early Christian Studies at the Australian Catholic University.

== Honours ==
In 1996 Allen was elected a Fellow of the Australian Academy of the Humanities, while in July 2016, she was elected a corresponding Fellow of the British Academy (FBA).

== Selected works ==
- Barbara Garlick; Suzanne Dixon; Pauline Allen, eds. (1992). Stereotypes of women in power: historical perspectives and revisionist views. Greenwood Press. ISBN 978-0-313-27731-3.
- Mary B. Cunningham; Pauline Allen, eds. (1998). Preacher and His Audience: Studies in Early Christian and Byzantine Homiletics. BRILL. ISBN 90-04-10681-2.
- Pauline Allen; Wendy Mayer (2002). John Chrysostom. Routledge. ISBN 978-1-134-67330-8.
- Pauline Allen; Robert Hayward (2004). Severus of Antioch. Psychology Press. ISBN 978-0-415-23401-6.
- Pauline Allen; Bronwen Neil; Wendy Mayer, eds. (2009). Preaching Poverty in Late Antiquity: Perceptions and Realities. Evangelische Verlagsanstalt. ISBN 978-3-374-02728-6.
- Pauline Allen; Bronwen Neil (2015). The Oxford Handbook of Maximus the Confessor. Oxford University Press. ISBN 978-0-19-967383-4.
- Bronwen Neil; Pauline Allen (2020). Conflict & Negotiation in the Early Church: Letters from Late Antiquity, Translated from the Greek, Latin, and Syriac. The Catholic University of America Press. ISBN 978-0-8132-3277-5.
