= Eikoston =

Roman Egypt Christian monastery

The Eikoston (Greek Εἰκοστόν, "twentieth") was a Christian monastic complex in Roman Egypt between the 5th and 7th centuries. It was located at the twentieth milestone west of Alexandria along the coastal road between Lake Mareotis and the Mediterranean Sea. It was one of a series of monastic sites along the coast west of Alexandria, others being found at the fifth (Pempton), ninth (Enaton) and eighteenth (Oktokaidekaton) milestones. The exact location of the Eikoston has not been determined.

In 457, the Miaphysite monks of the Eikoston took part in the election of Timothy Aelurus as a rival patriarch of Alexandria. Timothy was a former monk of the Eikoston. In the early 7th century, John Moschus and Sophronius the Sophist visited the laura (community of hermits) of Kalamon (al-Qalamun) located at the Eikoston. There, they visited with a holy man called Abba Theodorus. Two miles west of the Eikoston, according to Moschus' Spiritual Meadow, was a place called Maphora, the site of another monastery. There is a stela of uncertain date recording the burial of a monk named George from Maphora at Dikhaylah in the Pempton. In the late 7th century, John of Nikiû recorded the continued existence of the laura of Kalamon after the Muslim conquest of Egypt.

== Bibliography ==
- Gascou, Jean (1991). "Eikoston". In Aziz Suryal Atiya (ed.). The Coptic Encyclopedia. Vol. 2. New York: Macmillan Publishers. col. 951b.
