= Enaton =

Ancient Egyptian district

The Enaton (or Ennaton, Hennaton) was a monastic district in Egypt during the Middle Ages. It lasted into the 15th century, but it was at its height between the 5th and 7th centuries. It takes its name, which means "ninth" (Greek ἔνατον), from its location at the ninth milestone southwest of Alexandria along the coastal road.

The Enaton was composed of distinct monasteries and cells which elected a common hegumen (leader). Theologically, the Enaton was Miaphysite. In its heyday, the district was international in character, comprising both Copts and Syriacs. It was a waystation (Roman mutatio) for travellers from Alexandria to the monasteries of the Nitrian Desert and the monastery of Saint Mina. It probably served as an inn or hostel for pilgrims, tourists, merchants and their animals.

== Names ==
In Arabic, the Enaton became known as the Dayr al-Zujaj (Monastery of Glass) or Dayr al-Zajjaj (Monastery of the Glass Maker), terms that derive from Coptic ⲡⲓⲙⲟⲛⲁⲥⲧⲏⲣⲓⲟⲛ ⲛ̀ⲧⲉ ⲛⲓⲥⲁⲛⲁⲃⲁϫⲏⲓⲛⲓ, Pimonastirion ente nisanabajaini. A more faithful Coptic rendering of the Greek, El-Ainatoun, was also used. In Arabic, it is also sometimes called al-Hanatun (from Enaton), Bihanatun (from Graeco-Coptic ⲡⲓϩⲉⲛⲁⲧⲟⲛ, Pi-Hennaton) and Tunbatarun (from Greek Ton Pateron, "[monastery] of the Fathers"). The Ethiopic translation of the Arabic version of John of Nikiu's Chronicle calls the monastery Bantun, evidently a corruption of al-Hanatun.

== Location ==
The exact location of the Enaton is not known, but it must have lain on the taenia (strip of land) between the Mediterranean Sea and Lake Mareotis. It probably had an anchorage on the seacoast and served as an access point to the lake. The taenia was densely populated in late antiquity, with monasteries also at the fifth mile (Pempton), eighteenth (Oktokaidekaton) and twentieth (Eikoston).

In the early 20th century, archaeologists identified funerary stelae and the ruins of a church near the village of Dikhaylah as coming from the Enaton. These are now thought to belong to the monastery of the Pempton. A more likely location is several miles further west on the hill of Kom al-Zujaj.

As a result of its proximity to Alexandria, the Enaton provided a much easier life than the monasteries of the desert. When Hilaria, daughter of the Emperor Zeno (r. 474–491), tried to enter the monastery of Scetis, Abbot Pembo recommended that she join the Enaton instead because "it is moderate; there is at this time a group of wealthy people who have made themselves monks; they live without fatigue; they find consolation."

== Structure ==
The Enaton is described in the sources as both a laura (that is, a collection of individual cells or hermitages, often in caves) and a monasterion. It was composed of numerous autonomous foundations that varied in size from a lone hermit in a cell to large communities of monks. Each foundation was itself considered a monasterion, the most common type being the koinobion (community of monks). Each koinobion had its own church and was under the rule of a superior with the title hegumen, cenobiarch or proestos and usually referred to as "father" (apa or abba). A community often took the name of a particularly revered superior, not necessarily its founder.

The Enaton function according to a "federal constitution". The various monasteries elected a common leader with the title of hegumen. They had a common assembly and by the beginning of the 7th century a common oikonomos (steward). According to the History of the Patriarchs of Alexandria, there were 600 monasteries in the Enaton around the year 600. This number more probably represents the total number of monasteries in the region of Alexandria, as indicated by the Copto-Arabic and Ethiopian Synaxaria. Still, "the many establishments at the Enaton must have given it the appearance of a large town with irregular streets, houses with terraced roofs, and dogs running about."

== History ==
=== Origins ===
The origins of the Enaton are obscure. There are hagiographic sources that push back the Enaton's history to the time of the Diocletianic persecution in late 3rd or early 4th century, but their reliability is questionable. The monk Theodore, whose words are preserved with the Sayings of the Desert Fathers, is said to have come to the Enaton in 308. He was still alive in 364.

The Arabic Passion of Sarapamon, an account of the martyrdom of Bishop Sarapamon of Nikiu, records that the protagonist travelled from Palestine to be baptised by Patriarch Theonas of Alexandria (r. 282–300) and decided to become a monk in the Dayr al-Zujaj. Sarapamon was a victim of the Diocletianic persecution. His Passion, however, cannot be considered a completely reliable source.

The Coptic Martyrdom of Apa Kradjon also links the Enaton to Theonas. It says that during the persecution the patriarch ordained a certain Theopemptos as the bishop of the Monastery of the Fathers outside Alexandria. This monastery purportedly already had six hundred monks at that time. The Martyrdom, however, is largely legendary. John of Ephesus, in his Lives of Peter and Photius (written c. 565), takes the name "Monastery of the Fathers" to refer to the Enaton as a whole.

A more reliable source for the early history of the Enaton is the Coptic Life of Longinus and Lucius, a biography of the 5th-century hegumens Longinus and Lucius. It is generally considered basically historical. It indicates that in the time of Longinus (450s) there were already monks buried in a cemetery at the Enaton. The site thus appears to have existed for some time before Longinus' election.

According to Basil of Oxyrhynchus, in a sermon on Longinus' virtues, the monastery founded by Abba Gaius from Corinth had originally been outside the Enaton. After it was joined to the Enaton community, Gaius was elected hegumenos.

=== Height ===
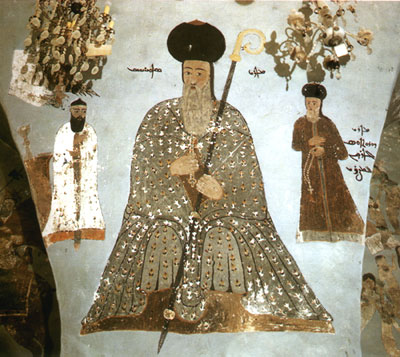
Severus of Antioch, who was buried in the Enaton.

Under Longinus, the monks of the Enaton strongly opposed the decisions of the Council of Chalcedon (451). Explicitly Miaphysite theology arrived at the Enaton in 453 with Peter the Iberian and his followers, who were exiled from Maiuma in Palestine. Other Miaphysite and anti-Chalcedonian exiles from Palestine and Syria followed: Julian of Halicarnassus, Severus of Antioch (518), Tumo of Ḥarqel (599) and Paul of Tella (599). Severus was buried in the Enaton.

According to Zacharias Rhetor's biography of Severus of Antioch, there was a holy man named Salama (fl. 482–489) who lived in a monastery in the Enaton that eventually took his name. He had students named Stephanus and Athanasius, the former of which also established a monastery at the Enaton that took his name. Two other friends of Severus are possibly to be associated with the Enaton. According to her Syriac biography, Anastasia the Patrician founded a monastery there. The Greek version of her life, however, places her foundation in the Pempton. Likewise, Caesaria the Patrician founded a monastery that may have been in the Enaton.

In the 480s, some monks of the Enaton collaborated with the Chalcedonian monastery of the Metanoia east of Alexandria against a (by then illegal) shrine of Isis at Menouthis. There was a brief period when the Enaton appears to have adopted Chalcedonianism, since in 542/543 it received a treatise from the Emperor Justinian I and in 551 Justinian appointed the monk Apollinarius of the monastery of Salama to the patriarchate of Alexandria. Nonetheless, the Enaton must have soon reverted to Miaphysitism. While the Chalcedonian (Melkite) patriarchs resided at Alexandria, the Miaphysite (Coptic) patriarchs could not. At least two—Peter IV (567–576) and Damian (576–605)—resided at the Enaton. Prominent Chalcedonian visitors include John Moschus, who stayed in the monastery of John the Eunuch, and Patriarch Sophronius of Jerusalem, who dedicated an anacreonticon to Theonas, the head (oikonomos) of the monastery of Tugara.

In 616, the Enaton was the site of a meeting between the Coptic patriarch Anastasios Apozygarios and the Syriac patriarch of Antioch, Athanasios Gamolo, to heal a schism that had separate their two Miaphysite churches since the late 580s. Neither could meet in Alexandria, since it was controlled by the Chalcedonians. Their reconciliation was made possibly by philological studies conducted at the Antonine monastery in the Enaton.

Between 615 and 617, while they were resident in the Enaton, Tumo of Ḥarqel and Paul of Tella produced major translations into Syriac, the Ḥarqlean version of the New Testament and the Syro-Hexaplar version of the Old Testament, respectively.

=== Decline ===
The Enaton was sacked during the Persian conquest of Egypt in 619, but survived the Arab conquest of Egypt in 641. The Persian sack suggests that the Enaton was by that time quite wealthy.

Although the Enaton occasionally benefited from Muslim rule in Egypt, it never regained its former glory. It seems to have maintained its federal constitution for some time, but by the 11th century it had become a single monastery. It maintained its international character and reputation for scholarship longer. It remained an active monastic centre until the 14th or 16th century. Its later history, however, is obscure.

In 689, the hegumen John was considered for the patriarchate. The one actually elected, Simeon I, had been an oblate serving at the tomb of Severus. He was buried in the same church as Severus. The next patriarch, Alexander II, was also a monk from the Enaton. By the time of the Patriarch Mark II in the late 8th century, there was a tradition that a new patriarch should visit the Enaton. This tradition was abandoned by the 15th century.

By the 11th century, the Enaton was a single monastery dedicated to Severus of Antioch. Owing to Severus and the Syriac influence, it had a Jacobite orientation. In 1066, the hegumen John ibn Tirus was considered for the patriarchate. The monastery may have suffered from Bedouin raids during the patriarchates of Shenouda II (1032–1046) and Christodoulos (1047–1077). The monastery had only about forty monks in residence during this period, a sharp decline from its heyday.

The Miracles of Abba Mina, possibly written as early as 1363, was attributed in the 18th century to a certain Archimandrite Mardarius of Gabal al-Niaton, perhaps a corrupted reference to the Enaton. Al-Maqrizi wrote in the 15th century that the monastery of Dayr al-Zujaj was also known as al-Hanatun and was dedicated to Bu Gurg the Elder, Saint George. He is the last author to write of the monastery as still existing. The monastery appears on western European maps from the 14th through 17th centuries, but it may have bee merely a placename by then. The decline of the monastery probably owes something to the disruption of the coastal traffic during the Crusades and the desertification of Lake Mareotis.

== List of monasteries ==
Dates are floruits. Italics indicate uncertainty of location.

- Monastery of Abba Andreas
- Monastery of the Antonines or Antonians (c. 615)
- Monastery of Dalamatia or Dalmatia
- Monastery of the Epiphany (567–569)
- Monastery of Abba Eustathius
- Monastery of the Fathers
- Monastery of the Apa Gaius (mid-5th century)
- Monastery of Abba John the Eunuch
- Monastery of Maphora
- Monastery of the Patrician (c. 576)
- Monastery of Salama or of Salomon (551–c. 600)
- Monastery of the Holy Severus
- Monastery of Stephanus
- Monastery of Tugara or Tougara (early 7th century)
- Monastery of Zaston
- Three Cells of Abba Zenon (late 5th century)

== List of hegumens ==
Dates are floruits.

- Gaius of Corinth (5th century)
- Lucius the Ascetic (5th century)
- Longinus of Lycia (451–457)
- Mina (c. 605)
- John (689)
- John ibn Tirus (1066)

== Bibliography ==
- Gascou, Jean (1991). "Enaton, The". In Aziz Suryal Atiya (ed.). The Coptic Encyclopedia. Vol. 3. New York: Macmillan Publishers. cols. 954b–958b.
- Ghattas, Mary (2017). "Toward the Localization of the Hennaton Monastic Complex". In Gawdat Gabra; Hany N. Takla (eds.). Christianity and Monasticism in Northern Egypt: Beni Suef, Giza, Cairo, and the Nile Delta. American University in Cairo Press. pp. 37–.
- Hatch, William H. P. (1937). "The Subscription in the Chester Beatty Manuscript of the Harclean Gospels". Harvard Theological Review. 30 (3): 141–155. doi:10.1017/S0017816000022203. S2CID 162340373.
- Juckel, Andreas (2011). "The Enaton". In Sebastian P. Brock; Aaron M. Butts; George A. Kiraz; Lucas Van Rompay (eds.). Gorgias Encyclopedic Dictionary of the Syriac Heritage: Electronic Edition. Gorgias Press.
- Goehring, James E. (2018). "Ennaton, Monastery of". In Oliver Nicholson (ed.). The Oxford Dictionary of Late Antiquity. Vol. 1. Oxford University Press. p. 538.
- Ward, Benedicta, ed. (1984). The Sayings of the Desert Fathers: The Alphabetical Collection (Rev. ed.). Cistercian Publications.
