= Covenant of Umar =

Covenant of Umar may refer to:

- Umar's Assurance of safety to the people of Aelia, known as al-ʿUhda al-ʿUmariyya, a 637 agreement between the second Caliph Umar ibn al-Khattab and Sophronius of Jerusalem, the Patriarch of Jerusalem
- Pact of Umar, a treaty signed between the Muslims and Christians in Syria or al-Jazira during the time of Caliph Umar
- Pact of Umar II, a document supposedly made by Umar II in 717.
