= John Wortley =

British and Canadian historian (1934–2019)

- Born: April 30, 1934; Bradford, Yorkshire, England, United Kingdom
- Died: August 22, 2019 (aged 85); Winnipeg, Manitoba, Canada
- Other name: John T. Wortley
- Citizenship: British, Canadian
- Occupation: Professor
- Spouse: Jan Roberts

Academic background
- Education: Durham University (BA, 1957; MA, 1960)
- Alma mater: University of London (doctorate, 1969)
- Doctoral advisor: Joan M. Hussey, Cyril Mango, and Robert Browning

Academic work
- Institutions: University of Manitoba
- Main interests: Early Christianity, Byzantine studies, medieval history, Desert Fathers

John Trevor Wortley (April 30, 1934, Bradford – August 22, 2019, Winnipeg) was a British-Canadian professor, Byzantinist, and Anglican priest. He was Professor of Medieval History at the University of Manitoba in Winnipeg, Canada. Wortley is known for his translations of early Christian and Byzantine Greek texts, including the Sayings of the Desert Fathers (2012, 2013, 2014, 2019), the Lausiac History (2015), and the Spiritual Meadow (1992).

== Biography ==
John Trevor Wortley was born to Alfred and Hilda Wortley on April 30, 1934 in Bradford, Yorkshire, England. Wortley obtained his BA in 1957 and MA in 1960 at Durham University. He was ordained as a priest by the Church of England in 1959.

Wortley immigrated to Winnipeg, Canada in 1964 when he was invited to teach at St. John's College by Blake Wood, who was the Dean of Divinity at the college. Wortley initially served as a chaplain at the college. In 1969, he returned to England to complete his doctorate studies in Byzantine Studies at the University of London, under the supervision of Joan M. Hussey, Cyril Mango, and Robert Browning. He then went back to Canada and joined the faculty of the University of Manitoba in 1969.

Wortley became an Honorary Fellow of St. John's College in 1999. He retired as professor emeritus in 2002.

On August 22, 2019, Wortley died from heart disease in Winnipeg, Canada.

== Books ==
- Wortley, John (1992). John Moschus: The Spiritual Meadow. Kalamazoo, MI: Cistercian Publications. ISBN 978-0-87907-539-2.
- Wortley, John (1996). The spiritually beneficial tales of Paul, bishop of Monembasia and of other authors. Kalamazoo, MI: Cistercian Publications. ISBN 978-0-87907-559-0.
- Wortley, John (2009). Studies on the cult of relics in Byzantium up to 1204. Farnham: Ashgate Publishing. ISBN 978-0-7546-6847-3. OCLC 430502020.
- Wortley, John (2010). John Scylitzes: A synopsis of Byzantine history, 811-1057. Cambridge: Cambridge University Press. ISBN 978-0-521-76705-7.
- Wortley, John (2012). The Book of the Elders: sayings of the Desert Fathers: the systematic collection. Collegeville, MN: Cistercian Publications; Liturgical Press. ISBN 978-0-87907-201-8. OCLC 759177015.
- Wortley, John (2013). The anonymous sayings of the Desert Fathers: a select edition and complete English translation. Cambridge: Cambridge University Press. ISBN 978-0-521-50988-6.
- Wortley, John (2014). Give me a word: the alphabetical sayings of the Desert Fathers. Yonkers, New York: St. Vladimir's Seminary Press. ISBN 978-0-88141-497-4.
- Wortley, John (2015). Palladius of Aspuna: the Lausiac history. Collegeville, Minnesota: Cistercian Publications; Liturgical Press. ISBN 978-0-87907-252-0.
- Wortley, John (2019). More sayings of the Desert Fathers: an English translation and notes. Cambridge: Cambridge University Press. ISBN 978-1-108-47108-4.
- Wortley, John (2019). An introduction to the Desert Fathers. Cambridge: Cambridge University Press. ISBN 978-1-108-48102-1.
