= Pope Andronicus of Alexandria =

Head of the Coptic Church from 616 to 623

Saint Andronicus of Alexandria
- Pope of Alexandria & Patriarch of the See of St. Mark
- Papacy began: 616
- Papacy ended: 16 January 623
- Predecessor: Anastasius
- Successor: Benjamin I

Personal details
- Born: Alexandria, Egypt
- Died: 16 January 623 Alexandria, Egypt
- Buried: Saint Mark's Church
- Denomination: Coptic Orthodox Christian
- Residence: Saint Mark's Church

Sainthood
- Feast day: 16 January (8 Toba in the Coptic calendar)

Pope Andronicus of Alexandria, 37th Pope of Alexandria & Patriarch of the See of St. Mark.

== Early life ==
He was from a rich family of great influence and his cousin was the chief of the imperial court at Alexandria, Egypt. He was very well educated and he studied the holy scriptures and excelled in their interpretation. Because of his knowledge, his righteousness and his charity toward the poor, he was ordained a deacon. By consensus he was chosen to be patriarch, although he never lived in any monastery. He remained in Alexandria all the days of his papacy, not intimidated by the authority of the Melkites.

== Sasanian conquest of Egypt from 618–621 ==
Shortly after the ordination of Pope Andronicus, the Persian King Khosrau II and his army came with mighty power against the army of the Romans, and destroyed them utterly, and annihilated them. They took possession of the land of the Romans, and the cities of Halab & Antioch in Syria, and took captive the land of Jerusalem, Idumaea, and the land of Egypt. The Persians invaded outside the City of Alexandria, were there are 600 inhabited monasteries. The monks were independent, and insolent without fear, through their great wealth; and they did deeds of mockery. But the army of the Persians surrounded them on the west of the monasteries, and no place of refuge remained for them; and so they were all slain with the sword, except a few of them, who hid themselves, and so were safe. And all that was there of money and furniture was taken as plunder by the Persians; and they destroyed 600 monasteries located outside of Alexandria, which have remained in ruins to this day. When the people of in the City of Alexandria heard what they had done, because of their fear, they opened the gates of the city for them.

King Khosrau II saw in a night dream someone saying to him, "I have delivered to you the city. Do not destroy it. But kill its heroes for they are hypocrites." He arrested the Governor of the city, and tied him up in chains. He ordered the elders of the city to bring forth the men, from 18 to 50 years old to come forward to give everyone twenty denari, and to enlist them as soldiers for the city. 80,000 men came forward and he killed them all by the sword.

Afterward, the Persian King with his army invaded Upper Egypt. He passed by the city of Niciu, which is also called Ibshadi. He heard that there were some 700 monks living in cells and caves. So he sent his troops and surrounded them, and when the sun rose, they entered and slew all of them with the sword, and not one of them remained. King Khosrau II continued to kill and imprisoned many Christians until Byzantine, Emperor Heraclius conquered Egypt and drove him out.

After Pope Andronicus had accomplished six years in his patriarchal office, and had suffered from the Persians, and seen all these disasters, which he encountered and patiently endured, he went to his rest, and departed to the Lord in perfect peace, holding fast to the right faith, the faith of his fathers, on the 8th of Toba (January 16, 623).

Preceded by Anastasius	Coptic Pope; 616–623	Succeeded by Benjamin
