= Elpidio Mioni =

Italian palaeographer, Byzantinist and librarian (1911–1991)

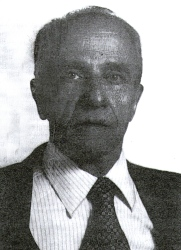
Elpidio Mioni

Elpidio Mioni (8 October 1911 – 6 September 1991) was an Italian palaeographer, Byzantinist and librarian, Professor of Greek Paleography at the University of Padua.

== Biography ==
Born in Bassano del Grappa, Mioni studied classics at the university of Padua and graduated, tutored by Manara Valgimigli, in 1934, specializing in Classical Philology in 1936. Loyal to his family's catholic and anti-fascist values, he was an active member of the federation of Italian Catholic university students (FUCI) and joined the Italian resistance movement to fight the Nazi occupation of Italy at the end of WWII.

He taught Greek and Latin in Veneto high schools for some 30 years, from 1938 to 1969; in 1954 he was habilitated to university teaching. He was nominated adjunct Professor in Ancient Christian Literature (1958–1960), Byzantine philology (1960–1967) and Greek Palaeography (1960–1974) at the University of Padua. In 1968 Mioni and Filippo Maria Pontani jointly founded the Institute of Byzantine and Neohellenic Studies in the same university.

In 1974 Mioni became Full Professor of Greek Palaeography at the University of Padua; he retired in 1981.

Mioni died in Padua in 1991, aged 79. His son, Alberto Mioni (1942 – 2017), was a linguist and an Arabist and taught at the University of Padua himself.

== Research Activity ==
Mioni was primarily a Byzantinist, a palaeographer and a librarian. As a librarian and palaeographer, his major contributions were his cataloguing of Greek manuscripts held in the Biblioteca Marciana in Venice and in other Italian libraries. He also wrote monographs on manuscripts of Aristotle's works in the Biblioteca Marciana and on Greek manuscripts in Veneto libraries, as well as a shorthand manual of Greek palaeography.

At the same time, he studied late antique and Byzantine literature, focusing on hagiography and hymnography. He wrote a critical study on the 6th century hymnwriter Romanos the Melodist and studied the manuscript tradition and the style of his kontakia; more broadly, he wrote critical essays on Byzantine hymns and ascetic works, including the Spiritual Meadow. He also studied the manuscript tradition of the Greek Anthology, the manuscript tradition of Strabo, the life and cultural entourage of Bessarion and his books, and wrote his biography (which he left unfinished).

Additionally, he wrote several entries for the Dizionario Biografico degli Italiani, and the article on John Moschus for the Dictionnaire de Spiritualité.

== Bibliography (selection) ==
=== Books and catalogues ===
- Mioni, E. (1937). Romano il Melode. Saggio critico e dieci inni inediti. Turin: G. B. Paravia.
- Mioni, E. (1949). Polibio. Padua: CEDAM.
- Mioni, E. (1958). Aristotelis codices Graeci qui in bibliothecis Venetis adservantur. Studia Aristotelica, 1. Padua: Seminario di Padova. ISBN 978-88-8455-262-4.
- Mioni, E. (1959). Un ignoto Dioscoride miniato (Il codice greco 194 del Seminario di Padova). Padua: Seminario di Padova.
- Mioni, E. (1963). Appunti di Paleografia greca. Padua: CEDAM.
  - Mioni, E. (1965). Appunti di Paleografia greca (2nd ed.). Padua: CEDAM.
  - Mioni, E. (1968). Appunti di Paleografia greca (3rd ed.). Padua: CEDAM.
- Mioni, E. (1973). Introduzione alla Paleografia greca. Studi bizantini e neogreci, 5. Padua: Liviana. — This is a revised and enlarged edition of Appunti 1963, 1965, 1968.
- Mioni, E.; Formentin, M. (1975). I codici greci in minuscola dei sec. IX e X della Biblioteca nazionale marciana. Studi bizantini e neogreci, 8. Padua: Liviana.

=== Catalogues of Greek Manuscripts ===
==== Biblioteca Marciana ====
- Mioni, E. (1960). Bibliothecae D. Marci Venetiarum Codices graeci manuscripti. Vol. II: classes VI, VII and VIII. Rome: Istituto Poligrafico dello Stato.
- Mioni, E. (1967). Bibliothecae D. Marci Venetiarum Codices graeci manuscripti. Vol. I/1: classes I and II, codd. 1-120. Rome: Istituto Poligrafico dello Stato.
- Mioni, E. (1972a). Bibliothecae D. Marci Venetiarum Codices graeci manuscripti. Vol. I/2: class II, codd. 121-198, classes III, IV, V. Rome: Istituto Poligrafico dello Stato.
- Mioni, E. (1972b). Bibliothecae D. Marci Venetiarum Codices graeci manuscripti. Vol. III: classes IX, X, XI, supplements. Rome: Istituto Poligrafico dello Stato.
- Mioni, E. (1981). Bibliothecae D. Marci Venetiarum Codices graeci manuscripti: Thesaurus antiquus. Indici e Cataloghi, Nuova Serie 6. Vol. I, codices 1-299. Rome: Istituto Poligrafico dello Stato. ISBN 9788824030885.
- Mioni, E. (1985). Bibliothecae D. Marci Venetiarum Codices graeci manuscripti: Thesaurus antiquus. Indici e Cataloghi, Nuova Serie 6. Vol. II, codices 300-625. Rome: Istituto Poligrafico dello Stato. ISBN 9788824030915.
- Mioni, E. (1987). Bibliothecae D. Marci Venetiarum Codices graeci manuscripti: Indices. Indici e Cataloghi, Nuova Serie 6. Rome: Istituto Poligrafico e Zecca dello Stato. ISBN 9788824030922.

==== Greek manuscripts in Italian libraries ====
- Mioni, E. (1965). Catalogo di manoscritti greci esistenti nelle Biblioteche Italiane. Indici e Cataloghi, Nuova Serie 20. Vol. I–II. Rome: Istituto Poligrafico dello Stato.

=== Articles ===
- Mioni, E. (1936–1937). "I Kontakaria del Monte Athos". Atti del Regio Istituto Veneto di Scienze Lettere ed Arti. 96: 21–87.
- Mioni, E. (1939). "Osservazioni sulla tradizione manoscritta di Romano il Melode". Atti del V Congresso Internazionale di Studi Bizantini. Roma 20-26 settembre 1936. Studi Bizantini e Neoellenici, 5. Vol. I. Rome: Tipografia del Senato. pp. 507–513.
- Mioni, E. (1947). "I Kontakia di Gregorio di Siracusa". Bollettino della Badia Greca di Grottaferrata. 1: 1–7.
- Mioni, E. (1948a). "I Kontakia inediti di Giuseppe Innografo. Studio introduttivo e testi". Bollettino della Badia Greca di Grottaferrata. 2: 87–88, 177–192.
- Mioni, E. (1948b). "Inni bizantini inediti in onore di Gregorio d'Armenia". Bazmavēp. 106 (5–6): 118–124.
- Mioni, E. (1949). "Un inno inedito di Leone (Magistro)". Byzantion. 19: 127–139. JSTOR 44168650. — With a note by H(enri) G(régoire).
- Mioni, E. (1950a). "Le Vitae Patrum nella traduzione di Ambrogio Traversari". Aevum. 24 (4): 319–331. JSTOR 25820136.
- Mioni, E. (1950b). "L'encomio di s. Agata di Metodio patriarca di Costantinopoli". Analecta Bollandiana. 68: 58–93. doi:10.1484/J.ABOL.4.01025.
- Mioni, E. (1951). "Il Pratum Spirituale di Giovanni Mosco. Testi inediti del cod. Marc. gr. II, 21". Orientalia Christiana Periodica. 51: 61–94.
- Mioni, E. (1953). "Paterikà dello Pseudo-Mosco. Testi inediti". Studi Bizantini e Neoellenici. Vol. VIII. Rome: Tipografia del Senato. pp. 27–36.
- Mioni, E. (1958a). "Romano il Melode. Due inni sul S. Natale". Bollettino della Badia Greca di Grottaferrata. 12: 1–17.
- Mioni, E. (1958b). "I manoscritti greci di S. Michele di Murano". Italia Medioevale e Umanistica. 1: 317–343.
- Mioni, E. (1959). "Un nuovo Erbario greco di Dioscoride". Rassegna Medica: Convivium Sanitatis. 36: 169–184.
- Mioni, E. (1960). "Altri due manoscritti greci di s. Michele di Murano". Italia Medioevale e Umanistica. 3: 389–390.
- Mioni, E. (1961). "I frammenti di manoscritti greci dell'Archivio di Stato di Modena". Rassegna degli Archivi di Stato. 21: 217–224.
- Mioni, E. (1965–1966). "La codicologia greco-bizantina in Italia". Rivista di Studi Bizantini e Neoellenici. 2–3: 269–276.
- Mioni, E. (1968). "Bessarione bibliofilo e filologo". Rivista di Studi Bizantini e Neoellenici. 5: 61–83.
- Mioni, E. (1969a). "Bombace, Paolo". Dizionario Biografico degli Italiani. Vol. XI. Rome: Istituto dell'Enciclopedia. pp. 273–276.
- Mioni, E. (1969b). "Bonaccioli, Alfonso". Dizionario Biografico degli Italiani. Vol. XI. Rome: Istituto dell'Enciclopedia. pp. 354–356.
- Mioni, E. (1970a). "Bonfiglio, Luca". Dizionario Biografico degli Italiani. Vol. XII. Rome: Istituto dell'Enciclopedia. pp. 25–26.
- Mioni, E. (1970b). "Bongiovanni, Antonio". Dizionario Biografico degli Italiani. Vol. XII. Rome: Istituto dell'Enciclopedia. pp. 60–62.
- Mioni, E. (1972a). "Brugnoli, Benedetto". Dizionario Biografico degli Italiani. Vol. XIV. Rome: Istituto dell'Enciclopedia. pp. 501–503.
- Mioni, E. (1972b). "Nuovi contributi alla Silloge Vaticana dell'Antologia Planudea". Rivista di Studi Bizantini e Neoellenici. 8–9: 87–107.
- Mioni, E. (1973a). "Calcedonio, Alessandro". Dizionario Biografico degli Italiani. Vol. XIV. Rome: Istituto dell'Enciclopedia. pp. 513–515.
- Mioni, E. (1973b). "Calliergi, Zaccaria". Dizionario Biografico degli Italiani. Vol. XIV. Rome: Istituto dell'Enciclopedia. pp. 750–753.
- Mioni, E. (1973c). "Jean Moschos". Dictionnaire de Spiritualité. Vol. LIV–LV. Paris: Duchesne. pp. 632–640.
- Mioni, E. (1975). "L'Antologia greca da Massimo Planude a Marco Musuro". Scritti in onore di Carlo Diano. Bologna: Pátron. pp. 248–292.
- Mioni, E. (1976a). "Bessarione scriba ed alcuni suoi collaboratori". Miscellanea marciana di studi bessarionei. Padua: Liviana. pp. 261–318.
- Mioni, E. (1976b). "Note sull'Homerus A (Marc. gr. 454)". Annali della Facoltà di Lettere e Filosofia. Università di Padova. 1: 185–194.
- Mioni, E. (1978). "L'antigrafo dell'Appendice Barberino-Vaticana dell'Antologia Planudea". Miscellanea — Università di Padova, Istituto di Studi Bizantini e Neogreci. Vol. I. Padua: Liviana. pp. 69–79.
- Mioni, E. (1981a). "Capelli, Giovanni Battista". Dizionario Biografico degli Italiani. Vol. XXV. Rome: Istituto dell'Enciclopedia. pp. 698–702.
- Mioni, E. (1981b). "La catalogazione dei manoscritti greci in Italia". In Cuturi, M. C. (ed.). Il manoscritto: situazione catalografica e proposta di una organizzazione della documentazione e delle informazioni, Atti del Seminario di Roma, 11-12 giugno 1980. Rome: Istituto centrale per il catalogo unico delle biblioteche italiane e per le informazioni bibliografiche. pp. 15–28.
- Mioni, E. (1981c). "Una inedita cronaca bizantina (dal cod. Marc. gr. 595)". Rivista di Studi Bizantini e Slavi. 1: 71–88.
- Mioni, E. (1982a). "I manoscritti di Strabone della Biblioteca Marciana di Venezia". Bisanzio e l'Italia. Raccolta di studi in memoria di Agostino Pertusi. Milan: Vita e Pensiero. pp. 260–273.
- Mioni, E. (1982b). "Un lessico inedito di Massimo Planude". Akten XVI Internationaler Byzantinistenkongress, Wien, 4.—9. Oktober 1981. Jahrbuch der österreichischen Byzantinistik, 32/4. Vol. II/4. Wien: Österreichischen Akademie der Wissenschaften. pp. 129–138.
- Mioni, E. (1991). "Vita del cardinale Bessarione". Miscellanea Marciana. 6: 11–219. — Unfinished due to Mioni's death.

== Obituaries ==
- Arduini, F. (2002). ""Rinascimento virtuale": il ruolo delle biblioteche e delle istituzioni culturali italiane nell'ambito del progetto". Biblioteche Oggi. 20 (8): 31–37.
- Longo, O. (1994–1995). "Commemorazione del s.c. Elpidio Mioni". Atti e Memorie dell'Accademia Patavina di Scienze Lettere ed Arti. 107 (1): 71–75.
- Zorzi, M. (1991). "Ricordo di Elpidio Mioni". Miscellanea Marciana. 6: 7–10.
