= Pempton =

Coordinates: 31.122762°N 29.818239°E

The Pempton (Greek τὸ πέμπτον, "the fifth") was a complex of Christian monasteries in late Roman Egypt. It was named for the fifth milestone west of Alexandria along the coastal road between Lake Mareotis and the Mediterranean Sea, probably near present-day al-Maks. It is attested from the early fourth century until the beginning of the seventh. It was one of a series of monastic sites along the coast west of Alexandria, others being the ninth (Enaton), eighteenth (Oktokaidekaton) and twentieth (Eikoston).

The region around the Pempton was called the Eremika, "desert" in Greek. In 338, Palladius of Galatia went to live as a hermit there under the spiritual direction of a certain Dorotheos of Thebes, who had been living in a cave there for sixty years. He had built cells for the other brothers living the region. According to Sozomen and Xanthopoulos, writing at some distance, there were around that time 2,000 monks in the coastal monastic centres, including the Pempton. The first writer to record the presence of a monastery at the Pempton is Epiphanius of Salamis, who describes a visionary monk from there who behaved as if he were a bishop.

There are only a few scattered references to the Pempton in the surviving literature. On 18 April 448, an imperial edict condemning Nestorianism and the decree of the prefect of Egypt ordering it to be read were read at the Pempton. During the reign of Justinian I (527–565), according to the Life of Daniel of Scetis, a certain monk of the Pempton for eight years left to play the holy fool in Alexandria, becoming known as Mark the Mad. In the same reign but prior to the death of the Empress Theodora in 548, Anastasia the Patrician founded a monastery either at the Pempton, according to her Greek hagiography, or at the Enaton, according to the Syriac tradition. John Moschos, writing around 600, describes the Pempton as the location of Alexandria's gallows.

There is archaeological evidence of the Pempton monasteries. At Dekhela (Dikhaylah, Duḫēla), today a suburb of Alexandria, excavations in the early twentieth century and in 1966 uncovered funerary stelae and traces of religious structures. One marble memorial slab was placed for Abbot George, the steward of the Gaianite community of monks, who died in 601. A marble bas-relief slab depicting Saint Menas between two camels was also discovered. The identification of these finds with the Pempton was first proposed by Schwartz in 1923 and has been widely accepted.

== Bibliography ==
- Breccia, Evaristo; Crum, Walter E. (1907). "D'un édifice d'époque chrétienne à El-Dekhela et de l'emplacement du Ennaton". Bulletin de la Société archéologique d'Alexandrie. 9: 3–12.
- Gascou, Jean (1991). "Pempton". In Aziz Suryal Atiya (ed.). The Coptic Encyclopedia. Vol. 6. New York: Macmillan Publishers. cols. 1931a–1931b.
- Krueger, Derek (2000). "Tales of Holy Fools". In Richard Valantasis (ed.). Religions of Late Antiquity in Practice. Princeton University Press. pp. 177–186.
- Łajtar, Adam; Wipszycka, Ewa (1998). "L'épitaphe de Duḫēla SB III 6249: moines gaïanites dans les monastères alexandrins". The Journal of Juristic Papyrology. 28: 55–69.
- Schachner, Lukas Amadeus (2005). Economic Production in the Monasteries of Egypt and Oriens, AD 320–800 (PhD). Oxford University.
- Timm, Stefan (1988). Das christlich-koptische Ägypten in arabischer Zeit. Vol. 4 (M–P). Wiesbaden: Dr. Ludwig Reichert Verlag.
- von Wöss, Friedrich; Schwartz, Eduard (1923). Das Asylwesen Ägyptens. Munich. pp. 258–260.
