= Qalamun =

Qalamun or Qalamoun may refer to:

- Al-Qalamoun, Lebanon
- Qalamoun Mountains, Syria
- An-Nabek District, Syria
- Monastery of Saint Samuel the Confessor, called Deir el-Qalamun, Egypt
- Historical monastery of al-Qalamun, Eikoston, Egypt
