= Lucius the Ascetic =

5th-century Syrian Christian abbot at Enaton

- Born: Byzantine Syria
- Residence: Enaton
- Died: Egypt

Lucius the Ascetic was a 5th-century Syrian Christian abbot at Enaton. He was one of the Desert Fathers. He was a companion of Longinus.
