= Monastery of Saint Theodosius =

Monastery in al-Ubeidiya, West Bank, Palestine

Monastery of St. Theodosius
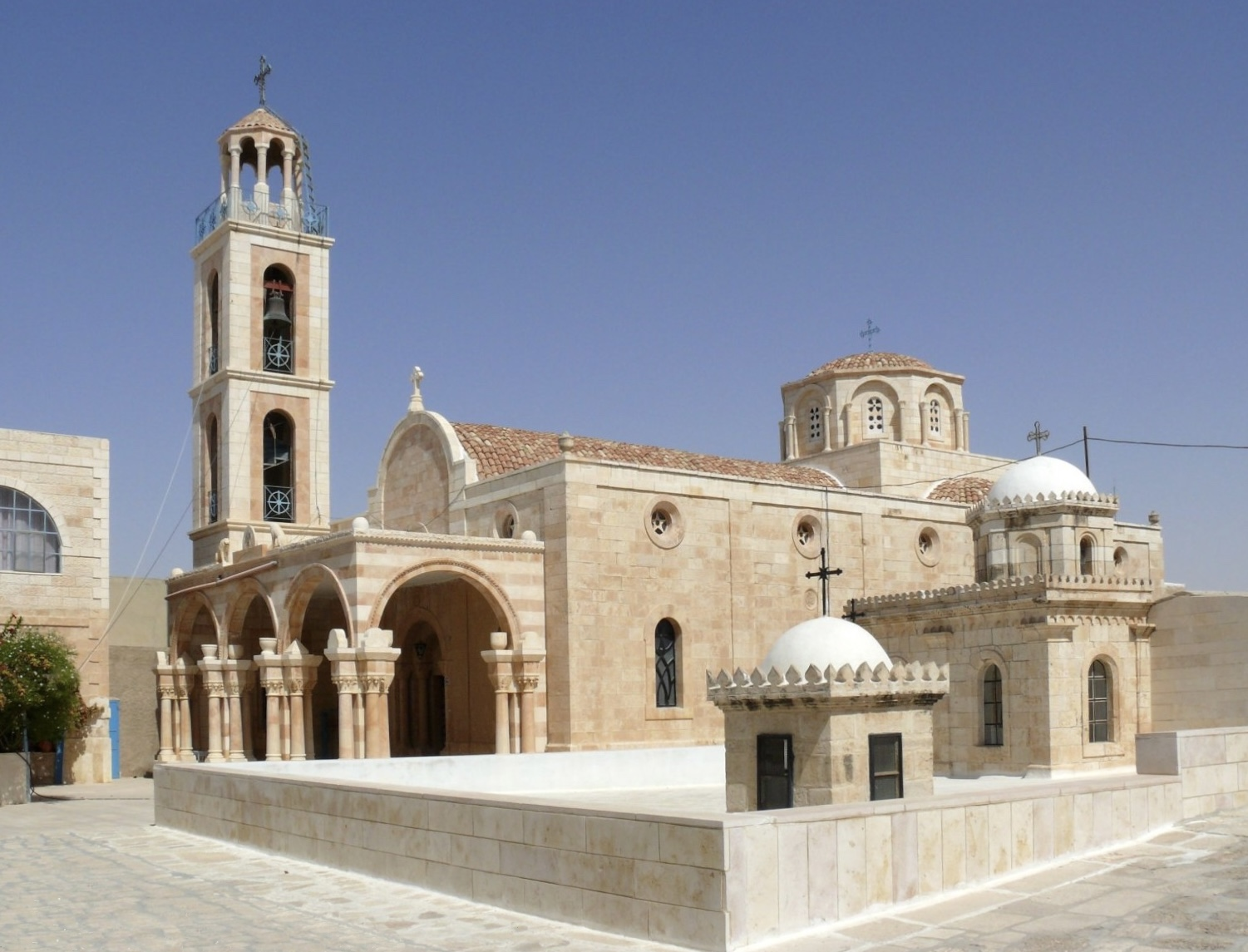

Religion
- Affiliation: Greek Orthodox Church of Jerusalem

Location
- Location: al-Ubeidiya, West Bank, Palestine
- Interactive map of Monastery of St. Theodosius
- Palestine grid: 1768/1254
- Coordinates: 31°43′16″N 35°16′58″E

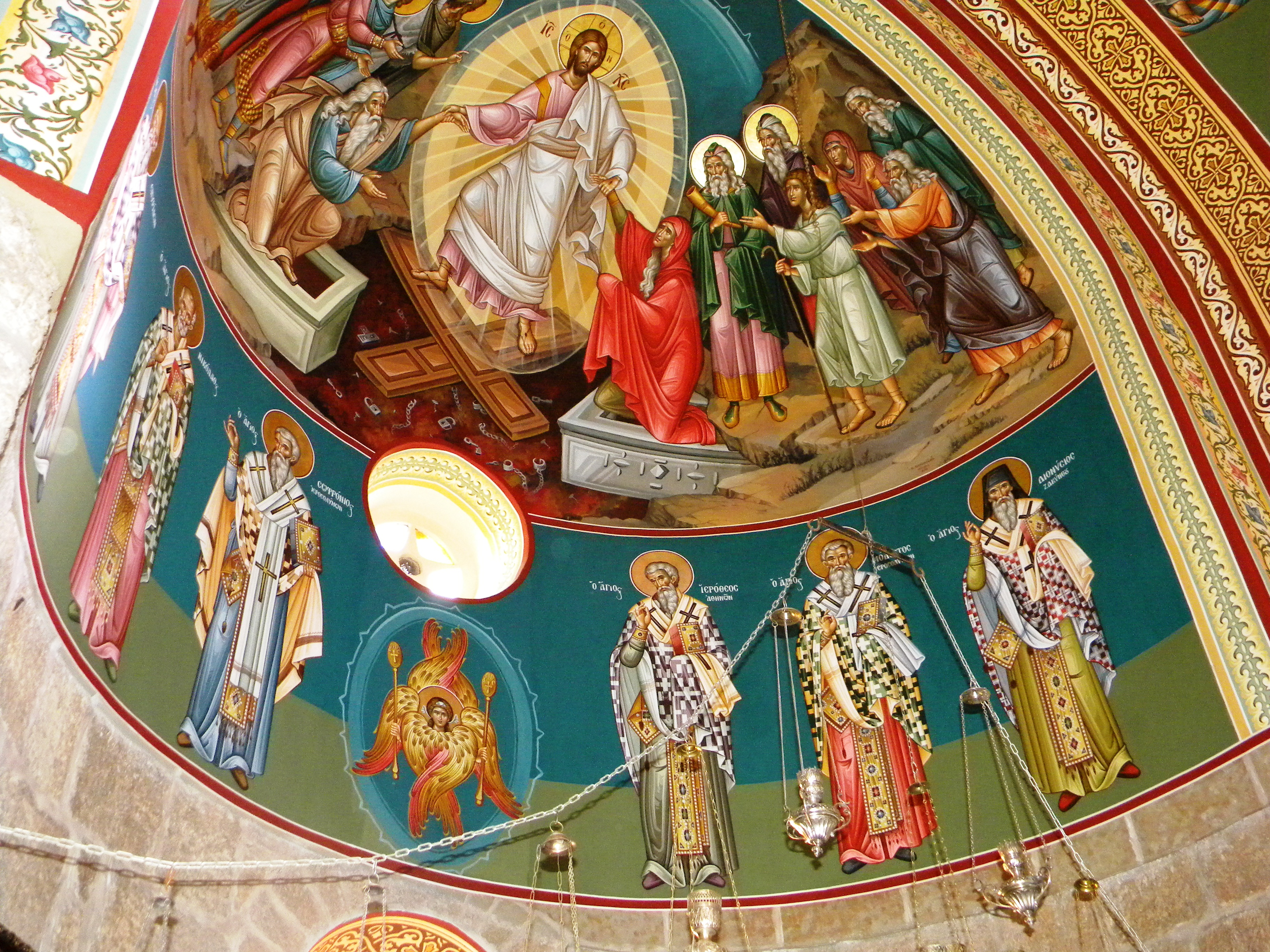
New church, northern apse, Harrowing of Hades on the half-dome, and saints (Saint Nicholas, Sophronius of Jerusalem, Hierotheos the Thesmothete, etc.) in the register below

The Monastery of St. Theodosius, also known as Deir Dosi and Deir Ibn Ubeid in Arabic, is a monastery founded around 476 by Saint Theodosius the Cenobiarch and that since at least the 12th century contains his (today empty) tomb. It is located within the village of al-Ubeidiya, some 8 kilometres east of Bethlehem, on the road towards Mar Saba (St Sabbas) Monastery, in the West Bank, Palestine.

== History ==
=== Byzantine period ===
A church of the Theotokos was built by Sophronius between 529 and 543, whose remains have been obliterated by the construction of the modern church.

The Byzantine monastery was destroyed in the first half of 7th century, during the Persian and Muslim conquests.

=== Early Muslim period ===
Ancient sources describe an attack by Arab troops on the monastery in 789, with churches being destroyed and monks being killed. This event is described as part of a series of such attacks against monasteries in Jerusalem and the Judean desert at the end of the 8th and beginning of the 9th century. Still, archaeology tends to paint a picture of peaceful abandonment, rather than destruction brought about by man or nature.

=== Crusader to Mamluk period ===
The monastery was rebuilt during the Crusader period.

Between 1113 and 1115 CE Abbot Daniel visited and noted: "Six versts from Jerusalem is the convent of St. Theodosius; it is located on a mountain; walls surround it. We see there, at the top of the mountain, in the enclosure of the convent, a cave which once served as a shelter for the night to the Magi, when they fled from Herod. This is where the relics of Saint Theodosius and several other holy fathers now rest, as well as those of his mother and the mother of Saint Saba."

The monastery survived and flourished well into the 14th century, but by 1400 it lay again in ruins. The Russian pilgrim Agrefeny described it as in ruins when he passed it around 1370. Two 15th-century pilgrims describe it as first used by Muslims for stalling cattle, and later as ruined.

=== 19th century state ===
In 1863, Victor Guérin visited the place, which he called Deir Dôsi, and noted:

The remains of the monastery of St. Theodosius consist of vaults and sections of walls built with stones of different sizes, some of which appear to come from ancient buildings. The location of two churches is very recognizable. One, which has now been converted into an area ["aire" in French; flat surface?], was paved with large mosaic cubes, as evidenced by numerous samples still scattered on the ground. This edifice is, moreover, almost entirely razed to the ground. Rectangular in shape, it faced west to east.

Of the other site he noted:

The second church, also shattered from top to bottom, has nonetheless suffered far less destruction than the other. It contained a crypt now half buried under piles of rubble. This crypt, if we are to believe a very ancient tradition, would have been originally a natural cave where the Magi supposedly took shelter, when, after having adored the infant Jesus in Bethlehem, they returned by another route to their country.

=== Modern reconstruction ===
The site of the old monastery was prepared for reconstruction by the Greek monks of the Jerusalem Church in 1898 and the compound was gradually rebuilt during the 20th century.

In 1898 Conrad Schick noted that "the ruins are [..] those [..] of a former convent, and only in modern times used as a storehouse for grain by the wandering tribe Ubedieh. Now it seems the Greek convent in Jerusalem had some rights of property in this place, and, having made an agreement with the Arabs to quit it, took possession of it last year. They began to remove the débris, and so laid bare the remaining walls, &c., and have begun to build it up again. The laying of the foundation stone, or a kind of resanctifying of the place, was celebrated in a grand manner and before a crowd of people. [..] The monastery will be restored, and again become a station for pilgrims visiting Mar Saba..."

== Significance ==
=== Cave of the Magi ===
A cave on the monastery grounds is, according to tradition, the place where the three Magi took shelter during the first night after delivering their gifts to the newborn Baby Jesus, after an angel had appeared to them and ordered them to return home without reporting Jesus' location to King Herod. This Cave of the Magi is called Metopa in Greek.

=== Tombs of saints ===
The cave was used during the Byzantine period as a cemetery. Important monastic figures of Palestine buried here include several saints, such as John Moschus, buried here by Sophronius of Jerusalem; Saint Sophia, the mother of Saint Sabbas the Sanctified; Saint Theodota, the mother of the Holy Unmercenaries Cosmas and Damian, etc.

== Bibliography ==
- Daniel (Abbot) (1864). Pèlerinage en Terre-Sainte de l'igoumène russe Daniel au commencement du ... (in French). St. Petersburg: Académie Impériale des Sciences.
- Guérin, V (1869). Description Géographique Historique et Archéologique de la Palestine (in French). Vol. 1: Judee, pt. 3. Paris: L'Imprimerie Nationale.
- Marti, K.; Schick, C. (1880). "Mitteilungen von Bauart C. Schick in Jerusalem über die alten Lauren und Klöster in der Wüste Juda". Zeitschrift des Deutschen Palästina-Vereins. 3: 1–43. (Marti and Schick, 1880, pp. 34-37)
- Pringle, D. (1998). "St Theodosius (no. 221)". The Churches of the Crusader Kingdom of Jerusalem: A Corpus. Vol. 2, L-Z (excluding Tyre). Cambridge University Press. pp. 271–278. ISBN 978-0-521-39037-8.
- Röhricht, R. (1887). "Studien zur mittelalterlichen Geographie und Topographie Syriens". Zeitschrift des Deutschen Palästina-Vereins. 10: 195–344. (p. 238)
- Schick, C. (1899). "Reports by Dr. Conrad Schick". Quarterly Statement - Palestine Exploration Fund. 31: 36-37.
- Tobler, T. (1854). Dr. Titus Toblers zwei Bücher Topographie von Jerusalem und seinen Umgebungen (in German). Vol. 2. Berlin: G. Reimer. (p. 978)
- Vincent, L.-H.; Abel, F.-M. (1914). Bethléem, le sanctuaire de la nativité (in French). Vol. 1. Paris: Paris, J. Gabalda. (pp. 28-29)
