= Passion of the Sixty Martyrs of Gaza =

Palestinian hagiography text

The Passion of the Sixty Martyrs of Gaza is a hagiography text pertaining to the martyrdom of sixty Byzantine soldiers at Gaza. Contrary to many hagiographies in which martyrs were killed for religious reasons, martyrs had also died for either military, political, or non-religious reasons such as in the Passion of the Sixty Martyrs of Gaza. Palestine's history during Muslim conquest in the Greek original Passion of the Sixty Martyrs of Gaza contains unique details of significant events along with Jerusalem's early occupation by the Muslims. The text is also an early witness to many of these events predating Theophilus of Edessa, even contradicting him such as Gaza's surrender on a different date and the circumstances leading to Sophronius's death.

== Narrative overview ==
Captured in Gaza (est. 639 AD), the first group of ten soldiers were executed at Jerusalem (est. November 11) for refusing to convert to Islam by the order of Ammiras, an Arab commander possibly identifiable as Amir ibn Abdallāh al-Jarrāh. Likewise, the second group of fifty soldiers were executed at Eleutheropolis (est. December 17) by the orders of Arab commander Ambrus who is possibly identifiable as Amr ibn al-Āș. Prior to the death of the fifty, Sophronius had ministered to the group who were imprisoned, to be steadfast; not a single soldier converted to Islam. Sophronius was later executed, possibly, because of events leading to the collapse of the first mosque at the Temple Mount.

== Manuscripts ==
Deriving in some way from the Greek but with issues, the two Latin recessions Story of Saint Florian and his companions and the Passion of the sixty were transmitted separately, yet are witnesses to the same text. The Greek original is not extant. The Passion of the sixty was evidently translated directly from a Greek text though, and contains incomplete sequences of events from either the Greek text or from the translation. It survives in a single tenth-century manuscript and has a simple narrative with no miraculous events. It contains, though partially corrupted, significant details not present in the Story of Saint Florian and his companions such as all the names of the martyrs as well as the names of their military units Voluntarii and Scythae. It did not conclude with the death of Sophronius in Jerusalem, but instead, with the deaths of the fifty soldiers at Eleutheropolis. The Story of Saint Florian and his companions evidently presents reworking, not from a Greek original, but an older Latin text. It contains the original conclusion with the death of Sophronius but is referred to as Florian in the text. The anonymous author states in the beginning of the text, with no indication of translating, that the passion of the martyrs was discovered in ancient manuscripts. The text survives in two fifteenth-century manuscripts and, unlike the Passion of the sixty, it does not contain the names of the martyrs and their military units. It does, however, include unique miraculous events throughout the narrative. For these reasons, historians reject the Story of Saint Florian and his companions in favor of the older text.

== Bibliography ==
- Bonner, Michael (2017). Arab-Byzantine Relations in Early Islamic Times. Routledge. ISBN 9781351957588.
- Pratt, Douglas; Tieszen, Charles L. (2020). Christian-Muslim Relations. A Bibliographical History, Thematic Essays (600-1600. BRILL. ISBN 9789004423701.
- Thomas, David Richard; Roggema, Barbara; Sala, Juan Pedro Monferrer (2009). Christian-Muslim Relations: A Bibliographical History (600-900). BRILL. ISBN 9789004169753.
