= El Max, Alexandria =

El Max المكس
- Location in Egypt
- Coordinates: 31.163753°N 29.863214°E
- Country: Egypt
- Governorate: Alexandria
- City: Alexandria
- Time zone: UTC+2 (EET)
  - Summer (DST): UTC+3 (EEST)

El Max (Arabic: المكس, al-Maks) is a neighborhood in Alexandria, Egypt.

It is the possible location of the ancient Christian monastic complex of the Pempton at the fifth milestone west of Alexandria.

== See also ==
- Neighborhoods in Alexandria
