= First Muslim conquest of Jerusalem =

636–637 siege in the Byzantine Levant by the Rashidun Caliphate

Coordinates: 31.7833°N 35.2167°E

- Part of the Muslim conquest of Syria (Arab–Byzantine wars)
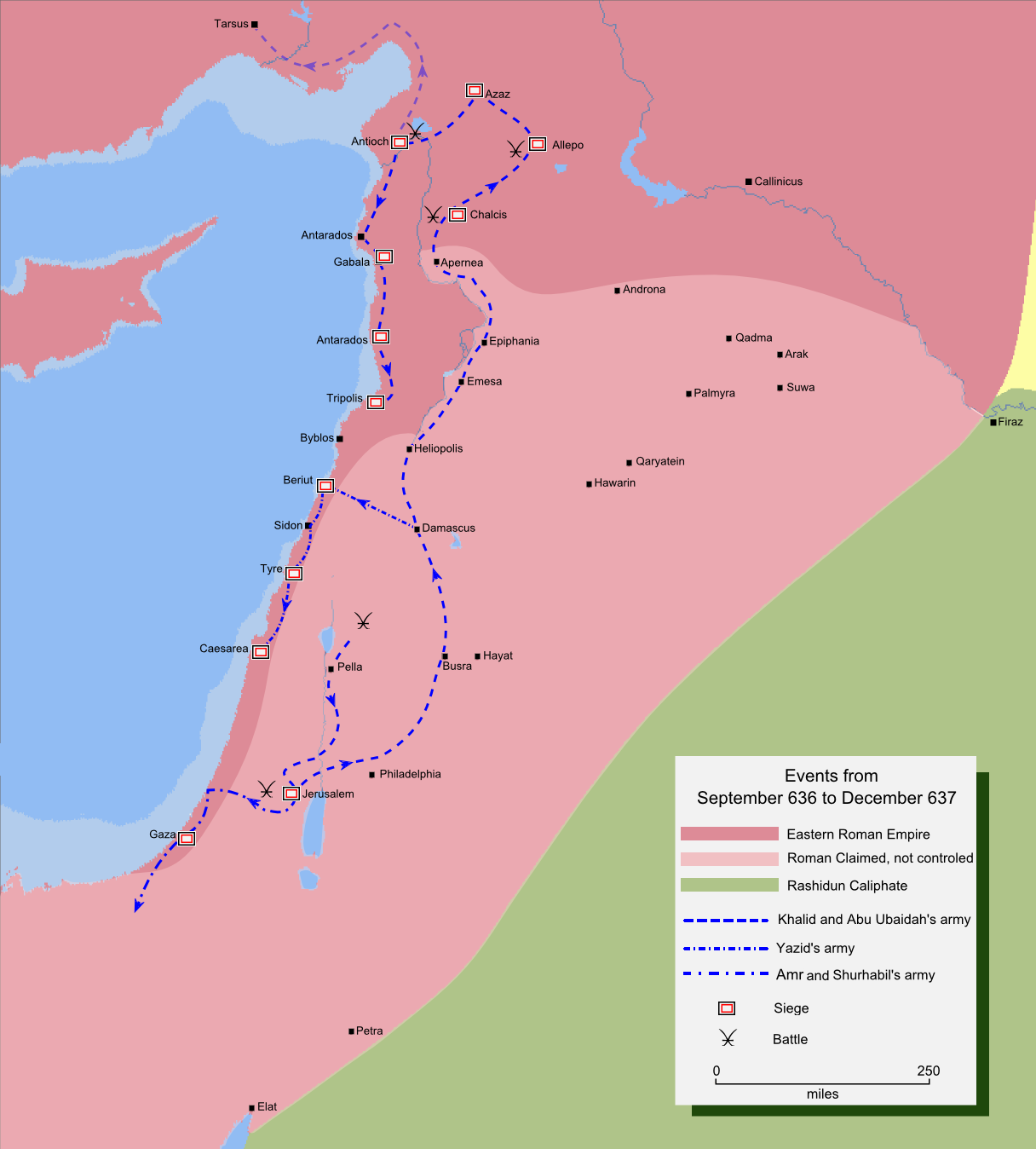
- Map of the Muslim invasion of Syria and the Levant (September 636 to December 637)
Date	November 636 – April 637 or 638
Location	Jerusalem
Result	Rashidun victory
Territorial changes	Jerusalem captured by the Rashidun Caliphate

Belligerents
Rashidun Caliphate	Byzantine Empire

Commanders and leaders
Umar ibn al-Khattab; Abu Ubayda ibn al-Jarrah; Khalid ibn al-Walid; Yazid ibn Abi Sufyan; Shurahbil ibn Hasana; Mu'awiya ibn Abi Sufyan	Sophronius (surrendered)

Strength
~20,000	Unknown

Between 636 and 637/38, during the Muslim conquest of the Levant, the Rashidun Caliphate took Jerusalem from the Byzantine Empire. It began when the Rashidun army, under the command of Abu Ubayda, besieged Jerusalem in November 636. After six months, Patriarch Sophronius agreed to surrender, on condition that he submit only to the caliph. In 637 or 638, Caliph Umar (r. 634–644) traveled to Jerusalem in person to receive the submission of the city. The patriarch thus surrendered to him.

The Muslim conquest of the city solidified Arab control over Palestine, which remained part of various Sunni caliphates until the Shia-led Fatimid Caliphate took over in 969. In 1073 the Seljuk Turks took control of Jerusalem, and Christian rulers regained control at the time of the First Crusade in 1099.

== Background ==
Jerusalem was an important city of the Byzantine province of Palaestina Prima. Just 23 years prior to the Muslim conquest, in 614, it fell to an invading Sassanid army under Shahrbaraz during the last of the Byzantine–Sasanian Wars. The Persians looted the city, and are said to have massacred its 90,000 Christian inhabitants. As part of the looting, the Church of the Holy Sepulchre was destroyed and the True Cross captured and taken to Ctesiphon as a battle-captured holy relic. The Cross was later returned to Jerusalem by Emperor Heraclius after his final victory against the Persians in 628. The Jews, who were persecuted in their Christian-controlled homeland, initially aided the Persian conquerors.

After the death of the Islamic prophet Muhammad in 632, Muslim leadership passed to Caliph Abu Bakr (r. 632–634) following a series of campaigns known as the Ridda Wars. Once Abu Bakr's sovereignty over Arabia had been secured, he initiated a war of conquest in the east by invading Iraq, then a province of the Sassanid Persian Empire; while on the western front, his armies invaded the Byzantine Empire.

In 634, Abu Bakr died and was succeeded by Umar (r. 634–644), who continued his own war of conquest. In May 636, Emperor Heraclius (r. 610–641) launched a major expedition to regain the lost territory, but his army was defeated decisively at the Battle of Yarmouk in August 636. Thereafter, Abu Ubayda, the Rashidun commander-in-chief of the Rashidun army in Syria, held a council of war in early October 636 to discuss future plans. Opinions of objectives varied between the coastal city of Caesarea and Jerusalem. Abu Ubayda could see the importance of both these cities, which had resisted all Muslim attempts at capture. Unable to decide on the matter, he wrote to Caliph Umar for instructions. In his reply, the caliph ordered them to capture the latter. Accordingly, Abu Ubayda marched towards Jerusalem from Jabiyah, with Khalid ibn al-Walid and his mobile guard leading the advance. The Muslims arrived at Jerusalem around early November, and the Byzantine garrison withdrew into the fortified city.

== Siege ==
Jerusalem had been well-fortified after Heraclius recaptured it from the Persians. After the Byzantine defeat at Yarmouk, Sophronius, the Patriarch of Jerusalem, repaired its defenses. The Muslims had so far not attempted any siege of the city. However, since 634, Islamic forces had the potential to threaten all routes to the city. Although it was not encircled, it had been in a state of siege since the Muslims captured the towns of Pella and Bosra east of the Jordan River. After the Battle of Yarmouk, the city was severed from the rest of Syria, and was presumably being prepared for a siege that seemed inevitable. When the Muslim army reached Jericho, Sophronius collected all the holy relics including the True Cross, and secretly sent them to the coast, to be taken to Constantinople. The Muslim troops besieged the city some time in November 636. Instead of relentless assaults on the city, they decided to press on with the siege until the Byzantines ran short of supplies and a bloodless surrender could be negotiated.

Although details of the siege were not recorded, it appeared to be bloodless. The Byzantine garrison could not expect any help from the humbled Heraclius. After a siege of four months, Sophronius offered to surrender the city and pay a jizya (tribute), on condition that the caliph came to Jerusalem to sign the pact and accept the surrender. It is said that when Sophronius's terms became known to the Muslims, Shurahbil ibn Hasana, one of the Muslim commanders, suggested that instead of waiting for the caliph to come all the way from Madinah, Khalid ibn Walid should be sent forward as the caliph, as he was very similar in appearance to Umar. The subterfuge did not work. Possibly, Khalid was too famous in Syria, or there may have been Christian Arabs in the city who had visited Madinah and had seen both Umar and Khalid, remembering the differences. Consequently, the Patriarch of Jerusalem refused to negotiate. When Khalid reported the failure of this mission, Abu Ubaidah wrote to caliph Umar about the situation, and invited him to come to Jerusalem to accept the surrender of the city.

=== Surrender ===
==== Year (636, 637, 638?) ====
The date of the surrender of Jerusalem is debatable. Primary sources, such as chronicles from centuries closer or further removed from the time of the events, offer the year 638, for instance Theophilus of Edessa (695–785); or 636, 636/37, and 637. Academic secondary sources tend to prefer 638. Encyclopaedia Britannica mentions both 637 and 638 in different articles.

==== Events ====
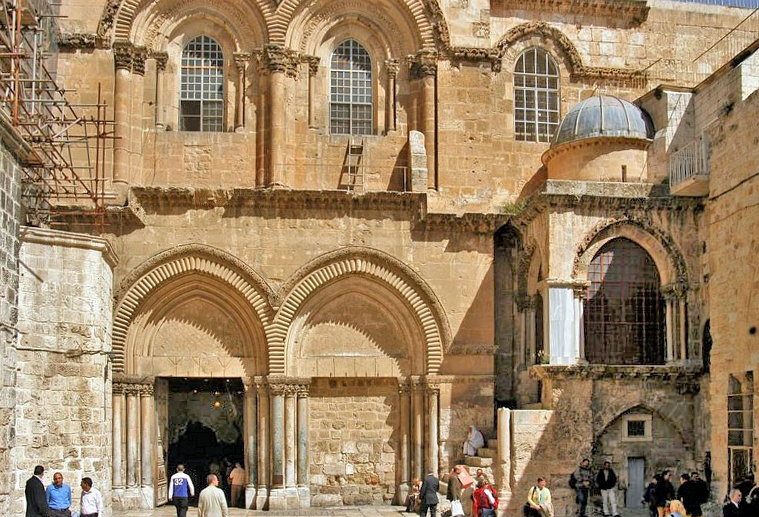
Present-day building of the Church of the Holy Sepulchre, where Sophronius according to Muslim chronicles invited Caliph Umar to offer salat (prayers)

According to some sources, Caliph Umar personally led the hostilities. In early April 637, Umar arrived in Palestine and went first to Jabiya, where he was received by Abu Ubaidah, Khalid, and Yazid, who had travelled with an escort to receive him. Amr was left as commander of the besieging Muslim army.

Upon Umar's arrival in Jerusalem, a pact was composed, known as Umar's Assurance or the Umariyya Covenant. It surrendered the city and gave guarantees of civil and religious liberty to Christians and Jews in exchange for the payment of jizya tax. It was signed by Caliph Umar on behalf of the Muslims, and witnessed by Khalid, Amr, Abd al-Rahman ibn Awf, and Mu'awiya. Depending on the sources, in either 637 or in 638, Jerusalem was officially surrendered to the caliph.

For the Jewish community this marked the end of nearly 500 years of Roman rule and oppression. Umar permitted the Jews to once again reside within the city of Jerusalem itself.

It has been recorded in the Muslim chronicles that at the time of the Zuhr prayers, Sophronius invited Umar to pray in the rebuilt Church of the Holy Sepulchre. Umar declined, fearing that accepting the invitation might endanger the church's status as a place of Christian worship, and that Muslims might break the treaty and turn the church into a mosque. After staying for ten days in Jerusalem, the caliph returned to Medina.

== Aftermath ==
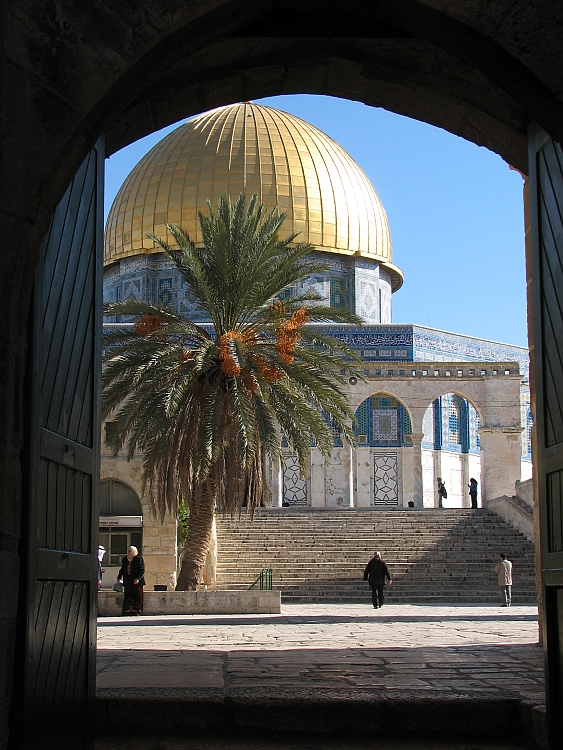
The Dome of the Rock, constructed by Umayyad Caliph Abd al-Malik in 691

Following the Caliph's instructions, Yazid proceeded to Caesarea, and once again laid siege to the port city. Amr and Shurahbil marched to complete the occupation of Palestine, a task that was completed by the end of the year. Caesarea, however, could not be taken until 640, when at last, the garrison surrendered to Mu'awiya, then a governor of Syria. With an army of 17,000 men, Abu Ubaidah and Khalid set off from Jerusalem to conquer all of northern Syria. This ended with the conquest of Antioch in late 637. In 639, the Muslims invaded and conquered Egypt.

During his stay in Jerusalem, Umar was led by Sophronius to various holy sites, including the Temple Mount. Seeing the poor state of where the Temple once stood, Umar ordered the area cleared of refuse and debris before having a wooden mosque built on the site. The earliest account of such a structure is given by the Gallic bishop Arculf, who visited Jerusalem between 679 and 682, and describes a very primitive house of prayer able to accommodate up to 3,000 worshippers, constructed of wooden beams and boards over preexisting ruins.

More than half a century after the capture of Jerusalem, in 691, the Umayyad caliph Abd al-Malik commissioned the construction of the Dome of the Rock over a large outcropping of bedrock on the Temple Mount. The 10th-century historian al-Maqdisi wrote that Abd al-Malik built the shrine in order to compete in grandeur with the city's Christian churches. Whatever the intention, the impressive splendor and scale of the shrine is seen as having helped significantly in solidifying the attachment of Jerusalem to the early Muslim faith.

Over the next 400 years, the city's prominence diminished as Saracen powers in the region jockeyed for control. Jerusalem remained under Muslim rule until it was captured by Crusaders in 1099 during the First Crusade.

== Hadith ==
Muhammad foretold the conquest of Jerusalem in numerous authentic Sunni hadiths, in various Islamic sources, including a narration mentioned in Sahih al-Bukhari in Kitab Al Jizyah Wa'l Mawaada'ah (The Book of Jizya and Storage):

Narrated Auf bin Mali: I went to the Prophet during the Expedition to Tabuk while he was sitting in a leather tent. He said, "Count six signs that indicate the approach of the End Times: my death, the conquest of Jerusalem, a plague that will afflict you (and kill you in great numbers) as the plague that afflicts sheep..."

The siege of Jerusalem was carried by Abu Ubaidah under Umar in the earliest period of Islam along with Plague of Emmaus. The epidemic is famous in Muslim sources because of the death of many prominent companions of Muhammad.

== Notes ==
a: The Muslims are said to have lost 4,000 men in the Battle of Yarmouk fought just two months before the siege.

b: Muslim historians differ in the year of the siege; while Tabari says it was 636, al-Baladhuri placed its date of surrender in 638 (Futuh II.XI or p. 139; p. 214 in Hitti translation). Agha I. Akram believes 636–637 to be the most likely date.
