= Pope Anastasius of Alexandria =

Head of the Coptic Church from 605 to 616

Saint Anastasius of Alexandria
- Pope of Alexandria & Patriarch of the See of St. Mark
- Papacy began: 605
- Papacy ended: 18 December 616
- Predecessor: Damian
- Successor: Andronicus

Personal details
- Born: Alexandria, Egypt Egypt
- Died: 18 December 616 Alexandria, Egypt
- Buried: Ennaton, monastery near Alexandria
- Denomination: Coptic Orthodox Christian
- Residence: Saint Mark's Church

Sainthood
- Feast day: 18 December (22 Kiahk in the Coptic calendar)

Pope Anastasius of Alexandria, 36th Pope of Alexandria & Patriarch of the See of St. Mark. During his reign, despite being barred from the city of Alexandria, he met with the Patriarch of Antioch as they worked to arrange the unification of their two churches.

== Life ==
He was one of the great noblemen of Alexandria. Before he became a Pope, he was an overseer of the patriarchal court, then he became a priest for the church of Alexandria. Shortly afterward, he was unanimously selected by the bishops and clergy of the Coptic Church to succeed Pope Damian of Alexandria as Patriarch. His biography was written by Severus Ibn al-Muqaffa in his History of the Patriarchs of Alexandria. His name does not appear in the standard biographical dictionaries of the Christian church. One possible reason for this omission is the fact that, as indicated in the History, the influence of the Council of Chalcedon's decisions was very strong at the time, both in Alexandria and in the court of Constantinople.

Not only were Coptic bishops of this time not officially recognized, they were also forbidden to enter Alexandria. The Coptic church in Alexandria was understandably troubled by this arrangement, which was instituted under the reign of Tiberius II Constantine, and his local adjutant named Belisarius. This persecution continued after the death of Tiberius under his son, Maurice. After the murder of Maurice by Phocas, who had overthrown him earlier, the situation deteriorated still further. A citizen of Alexandria who adhered to the Council of Chalcedon's edicts, Eulogius of Alexandria, wrote a defamatory letter to Phocas regarding Anastasius. Phocas responded by issuing an order to his prefect in Alexandria that the important church of Cosmas and Damian, and all its dependent churches, be turned over to Eulogius, who became the recognized Patriarch of Alexandria. Anastasius, deeply saddened by this, left for a nearby monastery.

With the increasing difficulties his church was facing domestically, Anastasius turned more of his attention toward improving relations with other churches. This led to closer contacts with the Church of Antioch. Athanasius I Gammolo, the new Patriarch of Antioch, did not share the support of the edicts of Chalcedon that his predecessor had. When Anastasius learned of Athanasius's succession there, he wrote him a letter commending him on his wisdom in retracting his predecessor's errors, and urged him to help establish closer relations, and perhaps even unity, between the churches of Alexandria and Antioch. Upon receiving the letter, Athanasius convened a council of his bishops regarding the proposal, and they decided to send a delegation to Alexandria to see if it would be possible to unite the two churches. Athanasius, with five of his bishops, set sail for Alexandria. The delegation arrived, and met with Anastasius, presumably outside of the city, as Anastasius was still barred from entering the city, possibly in the monastery in which Anastasius was staying.

On the arrival of the delegation, Anastasius summoned all of his bishops and clergy. The leaders of the two churches embraced each other with a kiss of peace, and declared their two churches to be united in doctrine. The two patriarchs remained in the monastery for a month thereafter, discussing a wide variety of topics, including implementing their newfound unity. At the end of the month, Athanasius returned to Antioch.

Anastasius spent the remaining years of his patriarchate attending to the affairs of his church, including its now closer relationship with Antioch. He also wrote prolifically on matters of theology. He is said to have written enough to have one book put out every year of his reign, presumably twelve books for the twelve years of his reign. Over the years, however, many of these writings have been lost.

== Veneration ==
Anastasius is considered a saint by the Coptic Church. His feast day is celebrated on 18 December.

== Notes ==
| Preceded by Damian | Coptic Pope; 605–616 | Succeeded by Andronicus |
