= Longinus (abbot) =

Start of the Life of Saints Longinus and Lucius the Ascetics in Morgan, MS M.579, fol. 88v, a manuscript made in Egypt sometime before 30 August 823.

Longinus (Greek: Λογγῖνος; fl. 451–457) was the hegumenos (superior or abbot) of the Enaton, a monastic community outside Alexandria in Roman Egypt. He is the subject of a Sahidic Coptic hagiography, the Life of Saints Longinus and Lucius the Ascetics, and a Sahidic homily, In Honour of Longinus, by Bishop Basil of Oxyrhynchus.

== Biography ==
According to his Life, which is considered historically reliable, Longinus was from Lycia in Cilicia. He and his teacher, Lucius the Ascetic, who is also the subject of the hagiography, worked so many miracles in Syria that they became quite famous. To escape their fame, they fled to the Enaton in Egypt. At the Enaton, Longinus made rope, which he sold to sailors. The profits he distributed as alms. He was elected hegumenos before the Council of Chalcedon (451) deposed Patriarch Dioscorus I of Alexandria. After Dioscorus sent a statement of his Miaphysite faith to the Enaton, Longinus led the opposition to the council. He staunchly opposed the Emperor Marcian and played a role in electing a rival anti-Chalcedonian patriarch, Timothy II, to succeed Dioscorus. He was still hegumenos when Marcian died in 457.

== Sources ==
Five vignettes of Longinus are included in the Greek Sayings of the Desert Fathers. The third describes how a woman suffering from breast cancer was cured after an encounter with Longinus:

A woman had an illness they call cancer of the breast; she had heard of Abba Longinus and wanted to meet him. Now he lived at the ninth milestone from Alexandria [i.e., the Enaton]. As the woman was looking for him, the blessed man happened to be collecting wood beside the sea. When she met him, she said to him, "Abba, where does Abba Longinus, the servant of God live?" not knowing that it was he. He said, "Why are you looking for that old imposter? Do not go to see him, for he is a deceiver. What is the matter with you?" The woman showed him where she was suffering. He made the sign of the cross over the sore and sent her away saying, "Go, and God will heal you, for Longinus cannot help you at all." The woman went away confident in this saying, and she was healed on the spot. Later, telling others what had happened and mentioning the distinctive marks of the old man, she learned that it was Abba Longinus himself.

== Bibliography ==
Primary

- Life of Longinus in Basset, René, ed. (1916). Le Synaxaire arabe jacobite (rédaction copte): Les mois de Ṭubeh et d'Amschir. Patrologia Orientalis, vol. 11, fasc. 5. pp. 764–767.
- Life of Longinus in Orlandi, Tito; Campagnano, Antonella, eds. (1975). Vite dei monaci Phif e Longino. Milan. pp. 77–79.
- Ward, Benedicta, ed. (1984). The Sayings of the Desert Fathers: The Alphabetical Collection (Rev. ed.). Cistercian Publications.

Secondary

- Depuydt, Leo (1994). "A Homily on the Virtues of Saint Longinus Attributed to Basil of Pemje". In Søren Giversen; Martin Krause; PeterNagel (eds.). Coptology: Past, Present, and Future—Studies in Honour of Rodolphe Kasser. Louvain: Peeters. pp. 267–292.
- Finn, Richard (2006). Almsgiving in the Later Roman Empire: Christian Promotion and Practice, 313–450. Oxford University Press.
- Gascou, Jean (1991). "Enaton, The". In Aziz Suryal Atiya (ed.). The Coptic Encyclopedia. Vol. 3. New York: Macmillan Publishers. pp. 954b – 958b.
- Ghattas, Mary (2017). "Toward the Localization of the Hennaton Monastic Complex". In Gawdat Gabra; Hany N. Takla (eds.). Christianity and Monasticism in Northern Egypt: Beni Suef, Giza, Cairo, and the Nile Delta. American University in Cairo Press.
- Vivian, Tim (1999). "Humility and Resistance in Late Antique Egypt: The Life of Longinus". Coptic Church Review. 20 (1): 2–30.
- Wortley, John (1996). "Two Unpublished Psychophelitic Tales". Greek, Roman, and Byzantine Studies. 37: 281–300.
