= Spiritual Meadow =

7th-century Christian book by John Moschus

- Author: John Moschus
- Language: Greek

The Spiritual Meadow (also known as the Pratum spirituale, Leimonarion Λειμωνάριον, or New Paradise) is a Greek book by John Moschus (d. 619 or 634) written in the late sixth to early seventh century. The text is composed of anecdotes from Palestinian and Egyptian monasteries from the travels of John during his travels with Sophronius, his friend, as they seek out spiritual edification. In all, it contains several hundred narratives, biographies, and collections of sayings.

No critical edition has been published yet of the manuscripts of the Spiritual Meadow, although one is in preparation by Bernard Flusin and Mme Marina Flusin based on manuscript Φ.

A French translation was published by Rouët de Journel in 1946, an Italian by Riccardo Maisano in 1982, and an English translation by John Wortley in 1992.

== Summary ==
In the Spiritual Meadow, John Moschus narrates his personal experiences with many great ascetics whom he met during his extensive travels, mainly through Palestine, Sinai and Egypt, but also Cilicia and Syria, and repeats the edifying stories which these ascetics related to him.

The Spiritual Meadow contains stories of various patriarchs and bishops such as Theodotus of Antioch, Elias I of Jerusalem, Ephraim of Antioch, Gennadius of Constantinople, Eulogius of Alexandria, Patriarch Amos of Jerusalem, John Chrysostom, Pope Gregory I, Patriarch Apollinarius of Alexandria, Synesius, and Athanasius of Alexandria. There are also stories of Byzantine emperors such as Anastasius I Dicorus and Zeno.

The work teems with miracles and ecstatic visions and it gives a clear insight into the practices of Eastern monasticism, contains important data on the religious cult and ceremonies of the time, and acquaints us with the numerous heresies that threatened to disrupt the Church in the East.

== Relationship with the Quran ==
In Quranic studies, beginning with Roger Paret, a number of historians have proposed similarities between Quran 18:65–82 with a story in a (still unedited) manuscript of the Spiritual Meadow. In the story as it appears in Moschus there is:

an angel of God (equivalent to the mysterious “servant of God” in the Qurʾān) who acts in ways that mystify an old and pious monk. The angel steals a cup from a pious man, strangles the son of another pious man, and rebuilds the wall which belonged to an impious and inhospitable man. The angel explains that the cup which belonged to the first man had been stolen. The son of the second pious man was to grow up to be an evil sinner; by strangling this son the angel allowed him to die before he fell into sin. Beneath the wall of the impious man lay hidden treasure, and by rebuilding the wall, he kept the man from finding this treasure and using it for evil. These line up closely to the Qurʾānic “Moses and the servant of God” passage.

== Manuscripts ==
A substantial number of manuscripts of the Spiritual Meadow exist, in Greek and other European languages. Manuscripts vary substantially however, as additions were made to some whereas other manuscripts contain selections of the tales, sometimes with varied ordering. This issue was already recognized in the 9th century by Photios I of Constantinople, who commented in his Bibliotheca: "Read a book composed of 304 tales ... The compiler has given the book the name Meadow ... And in all the books in which the tales are preserved you will not find an equal number, but in some they are divided into 342, with the number increased in part by the division of some chapters, and in part by the addition of tales."

The 15th-century Latin translation of the work by Ambrose Traversari was done from a 12th-century Florentine codex known as Laurentianus Plut.X.3 (== F). This is also the most complete manuscript. The Florentine manuscript contains a numbering from 1 to 301, which Traversari preserved, but was renumbered to go up to 219 by Lippomano in his 1558 Latin version, which has now become the standard numbering.

There are two Vatican manuscripts, called Vat. gr. 663 and 731. There are also two 10th and 13th century Georgian manuscripts at Iviron on Athos and at Sinai respectively containing selections of almost 90 chapters. An Arabic version of the text is known, called the 'Book of the Garden', and several manuscripts of it are also available. Old Slavonic manuscripts are called F. An Ethiopic patericon is also known. Coptic and Syriac versions are not known.

== Print editions and early translations ==
A few print editions and early translations of the text are as follows:

- A Latin translation, by Ambrose Traversari, is printed in Migne, Patrologia Latina, LXXIV, 121–240, and an Italian translation made from the Latin of Traversari was published in 1475 (Venice, 1475; Vicenzo, 1479).
- A Greek text was edited by Fronton du Duc in Auctarium biblioth. patrum, II (Paris, 1624), 1057–1159.
- A better edition was brought out by Cotelier in Ecclesiae Graecae Monumenta, II (Paris, 1681), which is reprinted in J.-P. Migne, Patrologia Graeca (PG) 87:3:2851–3112.

== Chapters ==
John Wortley's 1992 translation of the Spiritual Meadow contains the following 240 chapters.

1. The life of John the Elder and the cave of Sapsas
2. The elder who fed lions in his own cave
3. The life of Conon, priest of the community of Penthoucla
4. The vision of Abba Leontios
5. Abba Polychronios' story of the three monks
6. Another story of Abba Polychronios
7. The life and death of an elder who would not be higoumen of the lavra of the towers
8. The life of Abba Myrogenes who had dropsy
9. The wondrous charity of a holy elder
10. The life of Barnabas the Anchorite
11. The life of Abba Hagiodoulos
12. A saying of Abba Olympios
13. The life of Abba Mark the Anchorite
14. A brother assailed by a lascivious spirit who was stricken with leprosy
15. The wondrous deed of Abba Conon
16. Abba Nicolas' story
17. The life of a great elder
18. The life of another elder at the monastery of the lavra who slept with lions
19. Abba Elijah's story about himself
20. The conversion of a soldier (whose life is briefly described) when God worked a miracle for him
21. The death of an anchorite and of his slayer
22. The life of another elder named Conon
23. The life of Theodoulos the Monk
24. An elder who lived at the cells of Choziba
25. A brother at the monastery of Choziba, the words of <the prayer of> the holy offering and Abba John
26. The life of Theophanes, his wondrous vision and concerning intercourse with heretics
27. The life of the priest of the Mardardos Estate
28. A wondrous deed of Abba Julian the Stylite
29. A miracle of the most Holy Eucharist
30. The life of Isidore the Monk of Melitene and another miracle of the most Holy Sacrament
31. The conversion and life of Mary the Harlot
32. The conversion and life of Babylas the Actor and of Cometa and Nicosa his concubines
33. The life of the holy bishop Theodotos
34. The life of the godly Alexander, Patriarch of Antioch
35. The life of Elias, Archbishop of Jerusalem and concerning Flavian, Patriarch of Antioch
36. The life of Ephraim, Patriarch of Antioch and how he converted a Stylite monk from the impiety of the Severan heresy
37. The life of a bishop who left his throne and came to the Holy City where he changed his clothes and became a builder's labourer
38. The death of the impious Emperor Anastasios
39. The life of a monk of the monastery of Abba Severian and how he was prudently restrained by a country-girl from sinning with her
40. The life of Abba Cosmas the Eunuch
41. the life of Abba Paul of Anazarbos
42. The life of Abba Auxanon
43. The horrible death of Thalilaios, the impious Archbishop of Thessalonica
44. The life of an elder, a monk living near the city of Antinoë and concerning his prayer for a dead brother
45. The life of a monk, a recluse on the Mount of Olives and concerning the veneration of an icon of the most Holy Mother of God
46. The wondrous vision of Abba Cyriacos of the lavra of Calamon and concerning two books of the impious Nestorios
47. A miracle of the holy mother of God against Gaianas the Actor who was blaspheming her in the theatre
48. Another miracle of the Holy Mother of God by which Cosmiana, wife of Germanos, was compelled to return to the true faith from the Severan heresy
49. The wondrous vision of the duke of Palestine by which he was compelled to renounce the aforementioned heresy and to enter into communion with the Church of Christ
50. The vision and a saying of Abba George the Recluse
51. The life of Abba Julian, the elder of the Egyptians' monastery
52. A saying of Abba Elias the Solitary
53. The life of Cyriacos the Elder from the monastery of Saint Sabas
54. The life of the monks of Scete and concerning an elder <named> Ammonios
55. The life of an elder who stayed at Scete and concerning Abba Irenaeus
56. The life of John, the disciple of a great elder who lived in the village of Parasêma
57. The death of Symeon the Stylite and concerning Abba Julian, another Stylite
58. Concerning Julian again
59. The life of Abba Thalilaios the Cilician
60. The strange deed of an anchoress as a result of which a youth who loved her became a monk out of remorse; and concerning Julian again
61. The life of Abba Leontios the Cilician
62. The life of Abba Stephan, priest of the lavra of the Eliotes
63. Concerning the same
64. Concerning the same
65. Concerning the same
66. The life of Abba Theodosios the Solitary
67. Concerning the same
68. Concerning the same
69. The life of Abba Palladios and of an elder of Thessalonica, a recluse named David
70. The life of a Mesopotamian monk, Addas the Recluse
71. The beautiful saying of a murderer to a monk who followed him when he was being led to execution
72. Abba Palladios' story of an old man who committed murder and falsely accused a youth of the same crime
73. The life of John the soldier of Alexandria
74. A true saying of the same abba, Palladios, concerning heresies
75. A miracle of the Lord for the wife and daughter of one of the faithful who was accustomed to entertaining monks
76. The drowning of Mary
77. The story of three blind men and of how they became blind
78. The amazing miracle of a dead girl who detained her despoiler and would not let him go until he promised to become a monk
79. A tremendous and stupendous miracle of the most holy sacrament under Dionysios, Bishop of Seleucia
80. The spring conferred on the brothers of the monastery in Skopelos at the prayers of Theodosios, their abbot
81. A well that filled with water when an icon of the same Abba Theodosios was let down into it
82. The life of John, an elder at the Skopelos monastery
83. Concerning the same
84. The life and death of an anchorite of the same monastery, a servant of God
85. How the wheat of the same monastery germinated because the customary almsgiving had been suspended
86. Concerning another anchorite of the same monastery
87. The finding of the corpse of the anchorite John the Humble
88. The life of Abba Thomas, the steward of a community near Apamea and the miracle of his corpse after he died
89. The finding of a holy anchorite on Mount Amanon
90. The death of two anchorites on Mount Ptergion
91. The life of Abba Gregory the Anchorite and of Thalilaios, his disciple
92. The life of Brother George the Cappadocian and the finding of the body of Peter the Solitary of the Holy Jordan
93. The life of Abba Sisinios (who declined a bishopric) and of his disciple
94. The life of Abba Julian, the Bishop of Bostra
95. The life of Patrick, an elder at the monastery of Skopelos
96. Concerning the same <father> and also Julian, the blind Arab
97. The life and death of two brothers who swore never to be separated from each other
98. Concerning the surviving brother
99. The life of Anthony, an elder at the monastery of Skopelos
100. The life of Peter, the monk of Pontus
101. The life of Pardos, the Roman monk
102. The story of Sophronios the Sophist about what happened to him on the road
103. The life and qualities of Abba Strategios
104. The life of Abba Nonnos the Priest
105. The life of a holy elder named Christopher, a Roman
106. Abba Theodore's story of the Syrian monk, Severian
107. The life of Abba Gerasimos
108. The life of a virgin priest and of his wife, who was also a virgin
109. The life of Abba George who was never perturbed
110. Various sayings of an Egyptian elder
111. The deed of a bald man dressed in sack-cloth
112. The life and death of Leo, a Cappadocian monk
113. An injunction of Abba John of Petra
114. The life of Abba Daniel, the Egyptian
115. Injunctions of Abba John, the Cicilian
116. The brother who was falsely accused of taking a piece of gold
117. A brother with a demon, cured by Abba Andrew
118. The life of Menas the Deacon, a monk of Raithou
119. The demon disguised as a monk which came at the call of an elder at Raithou
120. Three dead monks found by fishermen at Paran
121. The life and death of Gregory, the Byzantine, and of another Gregory, his disciple, from Paran
122. Concerning two monks who went naked into church to make their communion and were not seen by anybody, except by Abba Stephan
123. The life of Abba Zosimos the Cilician
124. A story of the same <elder>
125. The beautiful deed of Abba Sergios the Anchorite
126. The unusual response of Abba Orentês of Mount Sinai
127. The life of Abba George of the holy mountain of Sinai and of another person, one from Phrygian Galatia
128. The life of Adelphios, Bishop of Arabessos and concerning the blessed John Chrysostom
129. The life of a Stylite
130. Admonitions of Abba Athanasios and his wondrous vision
131. The life of Abba Zachaios of Holy Zion
132. Concerning the same <elder>
133. The holy monk who immobilised a Saracen hunter for two days
134. The life of Theodore the Anchorite
135. The virgins who wanted to leave the monastery and were possessed by demons
136. The love of Abba Sisinios for a Saracen woman
137. Abba John's story about Abba Calinicos
138. Abba Sergios the Anchorite and a gentle monk who was baptised
139. Abba Sergios' prophecy concerning Gregory, higoumen of the monastery of Paran
140. The life of the same Gregory, Patriarch of Theoupolis
141. The judicious reply of Abba Olympios
142. Another judicious reply from Abba Alexander
143. David, the robber-chief, who later became a monk
144. Injunctions of one of the elders who were at the cells
145. The life of the blessed Gennadios, Patriarch of Constantinople, and of his reader, Charisios
146. The vision of Eulogios, Patriarch of Alexandria
147. The wondrous correction of a letter written by the blessed Roman pontiff to Flaviano
148. The vision of Theodore, Bishop of Dara, concerning the same most blessed Leo
149. The amazing tale of Amos, Patriarch of Jerusalem concerning the most sacred Leo, the Roman pontiff
150. The life and holiness of the Bishop of Romilla
151. John the Persian's story of the most blessed Gregory, Bishop of the City of Rome
152. The life and sayings of Marcellus the Scetiote, abba of the monastery of Monidia
153. The answer of a monk of the monastery of Raithou to a secular brother
154. The life of Theodore who lived in the world, a man of God
155. Abba Jordanes' story of the Saracens who killed each other
156. The reply of an elder to two philosophers
157. The story of two monks of the Syrians' monastery at Soubiba about a dog who showed a brother the way
158. An ass in the service of the monastery called Mardes
159. The life of Abba Sophronios the Solitary and some injunctions of Menas
160. How a demon appeared to an elder in the form of a very black boy
161. The life of Abba Isaac of Thebes and how a demon appeared to him in the form of a youth
162. The response of Abba Theodore of Pentapolis to the question of abstaining from wine
163. The life of Abba Paul the Greek
164. The reply of Abba Victor the Solitary to a faint-hearted monk
165. The life of a robber named Cyriacos
166. The life of a robber who became a monk and was later beheaded in lay clothes
167. The life and death of Abba Poemen, the solitary
168. Sayings of Abba Alexander the Elder
169. The life of a blind elder at the monastery of Abba Sisoës
170. The life of a holy woman who died in the wilderness
171. The life of two remarkable men, Theodore the Philosopher and Zoilos the Reader
172. The life of the above-mentioned Cosmas, the lawyer
173. The wondrous deed of Theodore the Anchorite who made fresh water at sea by his prayer
174. The deed of a religious ship-master who prayed to the Lord for rain
175. A story about the Emperor Zeno who was much given to almsgiving
176. The beautiful story of Abba Andrew about ten travellers, of whom one was a Hebrew
177. The bad death of an Egyptian monk who wanted to occupy the cell of Evagrios, the heretic
178. The life of an elder of the community of the Scolarii, a simple man
179. The life of a woman religious <sanctimonialis feminae> who was from the Holy City
180. The life of John the Anchorite who lived in a cave on the Socho Estate
181. Concerning the same
182. The life of Abba Alexander the Cilician who was besieged by a demon when he was near to death
183. The wondrous deed of David, the Egyptian
184. The life of Abba John the Eunuch and of a young man who resolved never to drink and of another elder greatly given to prayer
185. The life of a faithful woman who, with wondrous wisdom, converted her gentile husband to the faith
186. The life of Moschos, the merchant of Tyre
187. The teaching of Abba John of Cyzicos on how to acquire virtue
188. The life of two brothers who were Syrian money-dealers
189. The life of a woman who remained
190. The miracle of some wood given to Abba Brocha, the Egyptian
191. A brief life of Saint John Chrysostom, Patriarch of Constantinople
192. The story of a monk of the monastery of the godly Pope Gregory, and of how he was absolved of excommunication after death
193. The wondrous deed of charity by the holy Abba Apollinarios, Patriarch of Alexandria, for a rich young man reduced to penury
194. The exhortation of an elder who lived at Scete to a monk, not to enter taverns
195. The life of Evagrios the Philosopher who was converted to the Christian faith by Synesios, Bishop of Cyrene
196. The miracle which happened to the boys of Apamea who recited the prayer of consecration in a game
197. Rufinus' anecdote of Saint Athanasios and other boys who were with him
198. The reply of Saint Athansios, Bishop of Alexandria, to <the question of> whether one can be baptised without faith
199. The story of a simple elder who used to see angels when he offered the Eucharist
200. How a young goldsmith became the adopted son of a man of patrician rank
201. The life of a most noble man of Constantinople whose father, when he was dying, left him the Lord Jesus Christ as his guardian
202. The life of the servant of God, Abibas, the son of a worldly man
203. The story of a jeweller who, by a wise decision, saved his life at sea
204. How a religious woman who feared God restrained a monk from lascivious desire
205. Concerning another wise woman who, by judicious advice, turned aside a monk who was harassing her
206. A stratagem by which a great lady was taught humility
207. The life of an Alexandrine girl who was received from the sacred font by angels
208. The fine response of an elder to a brother besieged by depression
209. The fine exhortation of a certain holy elder on the words of the Lord's Prayer: lead us not into temptation
210. How a holy bishop overcame another one who was opposing him-by humility
211. Concerning an elder of great virtues who got a brother who had stolen things from him out of prison
212. Of two brothers who exercised marvellous patience in dealing with robbers
213. Why there are signs and prodigies from God in the Holy Church
214. The miracle of the baptismal font in the city of Cobana
215. Another miracle: of the baptistry of the village of Cedrebat
216. Some good advice about neither being obdurate nor remaining obdurate
217. The best advice of an elder: that a monk should not go near a woman
218. How Abba Sergios pacified a cursing farmer by patience
219. How a brother was reconciled with a deacon who was aggrieved at him
220. Theodor Nissen 1, BHG 1442b
221. Theodor Nissen 2, BHG 1442c
222. Theodor Nissen 3, Nau 342
223. Theodor Nissen 4, BHG 1440r
224. Theodor Nissen 5, BHG 1440q
225. Theodor Nissen 6, BHG 1440s
226. Theodor Nissen 7, BHG 1448i/1440kt
227. Theodor Nissen 8, BHG 1322n
228. Theodor Nissen 9, BHG 1450ze
229. Theodor Nissen 10, BHG 1442cb
230. Theodor Nissen 12, BHG 1450p
231. Theodor Nissen 13, BHG 1450u
232. Elpidio Mioni 1
233. Elpidio Mioni 2, BHG 1322b
234. Elpidio Mioni 3, BHG 1448z
235. Elpidio Mioni 4, BHG 1448z
236. Elpidio Mioni 5, BHG 1442m
237. Elpidio Mioni 6, BHG 1442mb
238. Elpidio Mioni 7, BHG 1442f
239. Elpidio Mioni 8
240. Elpidio Mioni 9
241. Elpidio Mioni 10
242. Elpidio Mioni 11, BHG 2102d
243. Elpidio Mioni 12, BHG 1076k
