= Agrefeny =

14th-century Russian archimandrite

Agrefeny (Russian: Агрефений; also spelled Agrefenii or Agrephenius) was a Russian monk and archimandrite who made a pilgrimage to the Holy Land around 1370 and left an account of his travels.

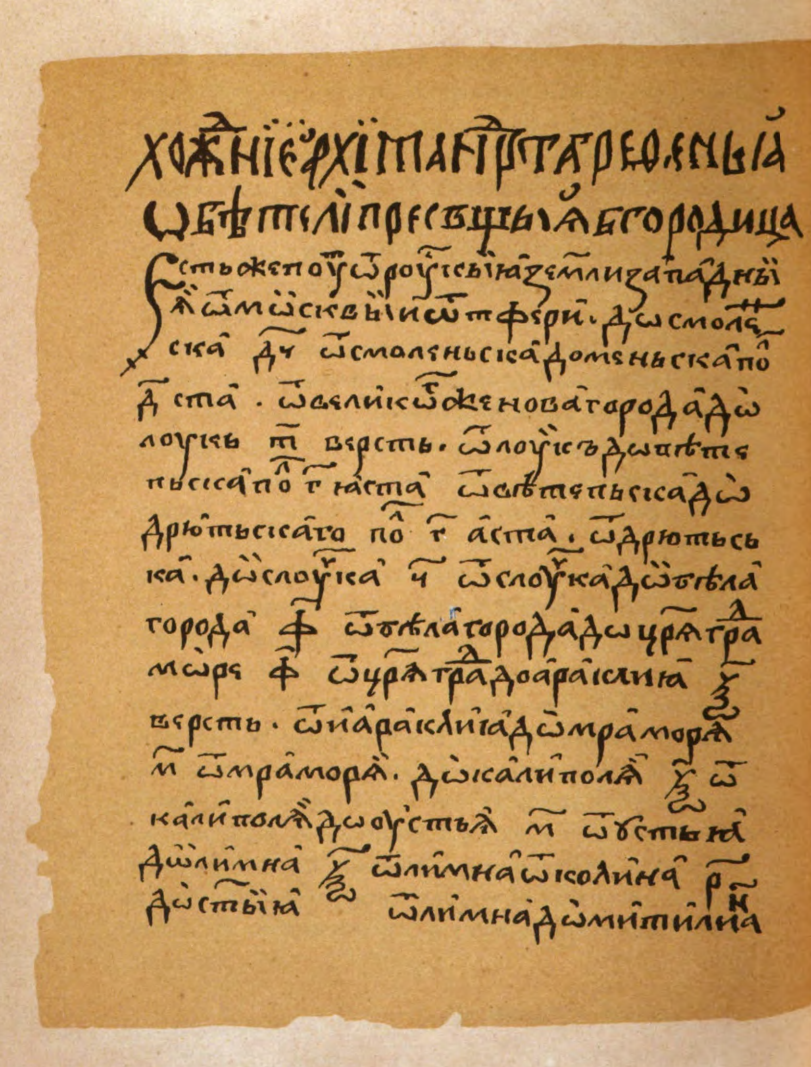
First page of Agrefeny's account of his pilgrimage

The name Agrefeny (sometimes read Grefenii) is probably a version of Agrippa, Agrippin or Agrippii. Agrefeny was the superior of a monastery dedicated to the Theotokos, either in Smolensk or possibly Tver. His account of his travels—called the Journey (or Voyage, Pilgrimage or Walking) of Archimandrite Agrefeny of the Monastery of the Most Holy Mother of God—was written shortly after his return in the 1370s. It is preserved in a codex from the Rogozhskoye Cemetery. It is the only illustrated work in the codex. It is also the only illustrated Russian example of a pilgrimage account, a genre that was commonly illustrated in western Europe. The Rogozhskoye manuscript dates to the 15th century and is today preserved in Moscow, Russian State Library, Rogozhin Cemetery Collection MS 253.

Agrefeny's account is of great historical value. He may have been the first Russian to visit Egypt, or at least the first to leave an account of visits to Cairo and Alexandria. He records that it took twelve days to get from Gaza to Cairo and a further six from there to Alexandria. This may not indicate, however, that he made the journey. He indicates fifteen days from Gaza to Mount Sinai and says that "up to there traveled the Orthodox Christians, but beyond this point the Orthodox Christians cannot go".

Agrefeny visited many churches and monasteries and is a valuable source of information about their state by the late 14th century. He reports that the monastery of Saint Theodosius was in ruins and is the last source to mention the monastery of Choziba. He visited the Armenian church of Saint James, where he saw the two red stones in a box in front of the building. He says that they were not large; a single man could lift both at once. He is the first source to indicate that there were two stones, not one, which according to legend had been brought from Sinai for Mary, mother of Jesus, to use as an altar.

Agrefeny explored the monastery of Saint Sabbas, both confirming and disconfirming reports of work done through the charity of the Emperor John VI Kantakouzenos (r. 1347–1354). He reports that the great church or katholikon of the Theotokos was ruined with nothing but an altar remaining. The repairs ascribed to Kantakouzenos had either not been carried out or been quickly undone. He records that the chapel of Saint Nicholas of Myra was locked and under Georgian control when he visited. He saw the aedicule with six columns that was rebuilt over Sabbas' tomb by Kantakouzenos, but he does not mention the saint's relics, which had either not yet been relocated there or elsewhere kept secret from visitors. He visited Sabbas' cell by means of two ladders and reports a chapel there. He is the first author to mention the cell of John of Damascus, accessible by a stairway from the ruins of the great church. He also saw an abandoned tower accessible through a cave and three water reservoirs, two reserved for pack animals.

In Jerusalem, Agrefeny observed the Ethiopian service in the Church of the Holy Sepulchre. It is a valuable account of the Ethiopian community in Jerusalem and its religious rituals. He observes that "the Church of the Holy Sepulchre is busy all year" and was served by "six fathers from the Greek, Georgian, Franciscan, Armenian, Jacobite and Ethiopian churches". Notably, he does not distinguish between Ethiopians and Copts. He calls the Ethiopians khabezhi, that is, Habesha (Abyssinians). His is the first Russian pilgrimage account to mention Ethiopians in the Holy Land and "he was evidently the first Russian to observe a large group of Ethiopians".

Agrefeny visited the Dead Sea and reports the salt along its shore.

== Editions ==
- Archimandrite Leonid (ed.). "Khozhdenie arkhimandrita Agrefen'ia obiteli preosviatye Bogoroditsy (okolo 1370 g.) [Walking of Archimandrite Agrefeny of the Monastery of the Most Holy Mother of God (circa 1370)]". Pravoslavnyi Palestinskii sbornik [Orthodox Palestine Collection], vol. XVI, no. 3. Saint Petersburg, 1896. (in Russian)
