= Anastasia the Patrician =

Byzantine courtier and Christian saint

Saint Anastasia the Patrician
- Born: 6th Century
- Died: 6th Century
- Venerated in: Catholic Church; Oriental Orthodoxy; Eastern Orthodox Church
- Feast: 10 March; 26 Tobi (Coptic Christianity)

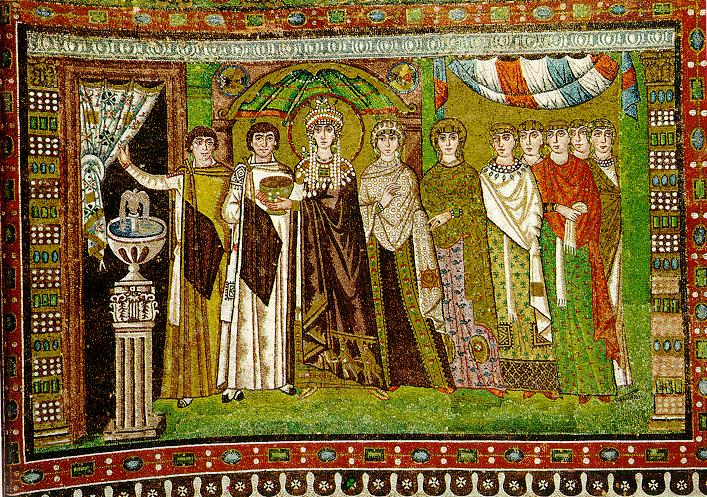
Empress Theodora and attendants.

Saint Anastasia the Patrician (Latin: Anastasia Patricia, Greek: Άναστασία Πατρικία, romanized: Anastasía Patrikía; fl. 576) was a Byzantine courtier and later saint. She was a lady-in-waiting to the Byzantine empress Theodora. Justinian I, Theodora's husband, may have pursued her, as Theodora grew jealous of her. Anastasia, to avoid any trouble, left for Alexandria in Egypt. She arrived at a place called Pempton, near Alexandria, where she founded a monastery which would later be named after her. She lived with monastic discipline and wove cloth to support herself.

Following the death of Theodora in 548, Justinian attempted to get Anastasia to return to Constantinople, to no avail. Instead, Anastasia left for Scetis, looking for help from Abba Daniel, hegumen of the monastery at that time. To safeguard Anastasia, he let her move into a laura or monastery cell 18 miles from Scetis in the desert, and dress as a (male) monk and take up the life of a hermit at a time when this was only permitted to men. He visited her every week and ensured that one of his disciples supplied her with jugs of water. Anastasia dwelt in seclusion for twenty-eight years.

In 576, aware of her approaching death, she wrote several words for Abba Daniel on a piece of broken pottery and placed it at the entrance to the cave. The disciple found an ostracon with the words "Bring the spades and come here." When Daniel heard this, he knew Anastasia was near death. He went to visit her with his disciple and to give her communion and hear her last words. Daniel revealed the full details of her story to his disciple after her death.

Her story survives in one recension of the Copto-Arabic Synaxarion and by a tale of Daniel of Scetis. Her feast day is 10 March in the Eastern Orthodox Church, the Catholic Church, and on 26 Tobi in the calendar of the Coptic Church, the date of her death given in the Ethiopic Life of Daniel of Scetis.
