= Umar's Assurance =

Guarantee of safety from the Caliph Umar

Umar's Assurance (Arabic: العهدة العمرية, romanized: al-ʿUhda al-ʿUmariyya) is an assurance of safety given by the Caliph Umar ibn al-Khattab to the people of Aelia, the Late Roman name for Jerusalem. Several versions of the Assurance exist, with different views of their authenticity.

The traditional view ascribes it to Caliph Umar ibn Al-Khattab and the time when Muslims captured Jerusalem in AD 637 or 638. The guarantees given to Christians regarding their churches and other property makes it one of the most important documents in the history of the city.

The significance of the Assurance is discussed by early Muslim historians, such as al-Waqidi (c. 747–823). The text of the document is included, abridged or in full, in works from the late 9th, 10th, and later centuries.

Opinions differ on the authenticity of the different versions of the Assurance. Many historians have questioned the authenticity of the Christian versions of this pact and argue that such documents were forged by Christian scribes to secure their possession of some religious sites. Some historians consider aspects of the version of al-Tabari (copied from Sayf ibn Umar, who died between 786–809) to be authentic. For instance, Moshe Gil while discussing al-Tabari's version points out that "the language of the covenant and its details appear authentic and reliable and in keeping with what is known of Jerusalem at the time."

== Historical background ==
By 637, Muslim armies began to appear in the vicinity of Jerusalem. In charge of Jerusalem was Patriarch Sophronius, a representative of the Byzantine government, as well as a leader in the Christian Church. Although numerous Muslim armies under the command of Khalid ibn al-Walid and 'Amr ibn al-'As began to surround the city, Sophronius accepted to surrender but he demanded that Umar come to accept the surrender himself.

Having heard of such a condition, Umar ibn al-Khattab left Medina to Jerusalem.

Umar travelled to Jerusalem and accepted the surrender. He then visited the Church of the Resurrection (today better known as the Church of the Holy Sepulchre) where Sophronius invited him to pray inside the church, but Umar declined so as not to set a precedent and thereby endanger the church's status as a Christian site. Instead he prayed outside, on the steps east of the church.

== Historical sources ==
The Assurance and its significance is discussed by early Muslim historians such as al-Waqidi (c. 747–823), al-Baladhuri (d. 892), in addition to Ibn al-Athir (1160–1232/3) and Abu al-Fida’ (1273–1331). The text of the document is included, either abridged or as long text, in the works al-Ya'qubi (d. 897/8), Eutychius (877–940), al-Tabari (copied from Sayf ibn Umar, who died betw. 786–809), al-Himyari, Mujir al-Din al-Hanbali, and Ibn al-Jawzi (c. 1116–1201).

=== Tabari's version ===
The text as reported by al-Tabari:

In the name of God, the Merciful, the Compassionate. This is the assurance of safety which the servant of God, ʿUmar, the Commander of the Faithful, has given to the people of Aelia. He has given them an assurance of safety for themselves, for their property, their churches, their crosses, the sick and healthy of the city and for all the rituals which belong to their religion. Their churches will not be inhabited by Muslims and will not be destroyed. Neither they, nor the land on which they stand, nor their cross, nor their property will be damaged. They will not be forcibly converted. The people of Jerusalem must pay the taxes like the people of other cities and must expel the Byzantines and the robbers. Those of the people of Jerusalem who want to leave with the Byzantines, take their property and abandon their churches and crosses will be safe until they reach their place of refuge. The villagers [who had taken refuge in the city at the time of the conquest] may remain in the city if they wish but must pay taxes like the citizens. Those who wish may go with the Byzantines and those who wish may return to their families. Nothing is to be taken from them before their harvest is reaped.

If they pay their taxes according to their obligations, then the conditions laid out in this letter are under the covenant of God, are the responsibility of His Prophet, of the caliphs and of the faithful.

Witnessed by: Khālid b. Walīd; ʿAmr b. al-ʿĀs; ʿAbd al-Rahmān b. al-ʿAwf; Muʿāwiya b. Abī Sufyān.

== See also ==
- Pact of Umar, apocryphal treaty possibly based on Umar's Assurance
