= Amos of Jerusalem =

Amos of Jerusalem was the patriarch of the Church of Jerusalem from 594 to 601, having succeeded as patriarch after John IV.

Little is known of the life of Amos. He apparently found it difficult to exercise his authority as patriarch, particularly in his relations with the abbot of the New Lavra, as Pope Gregory found it necessary to write to Amos and Anastasius (Athanasius?) requesting that they suppress the secular life of the monks at the monastery that was next to the Nea Church. Pope Gregory also requested they reconcile their differences, which they apparently did.

Patr. Amos built a church dedicated to St. John north of the walls of Jerusalem.

Religious titles
Preceded by John IV	Patriarch of Jerusalem; 594-601	Succeeded by Isaac
