= Pact of Umar =

Muslim treaty with Levantine Christians

The Pact of Umar (also known as the Covenant of Umar, Treaty of Umar or Laws of Umar; Arabic: شروط عمر or عهد عمر or عقد عمر) is a treaty between the Muslims and non-Muslims who were conquered by Umar during his conquest of the Levant (Syria and Lebanon) in the year 637 CE that later gained a canonical status in Islamic jurisprudence. It specifies rights and restrictions for dhimmis, or "protected persons," a type of protected class of non-Muslim peoples recognised by Islam which includes Jews, Christians, Zoroastrians, and several other recognized faiths living under Islamic rule.

There are several versions of the pact, differing both in structure and stipulations. While the pact is traditionally attributed to the second Rashidun Caliph Umar ibn Khattab, other jurists and orientalists have questioned this attribution with the treaty being instead attributed to 9th century Mujtahids (Islamic scholars) or the Umayyad Caliph Umar II. In general, the pact contains a list of restrictions on non-Muslims (dhimmis).

== Origin and authenticity ==
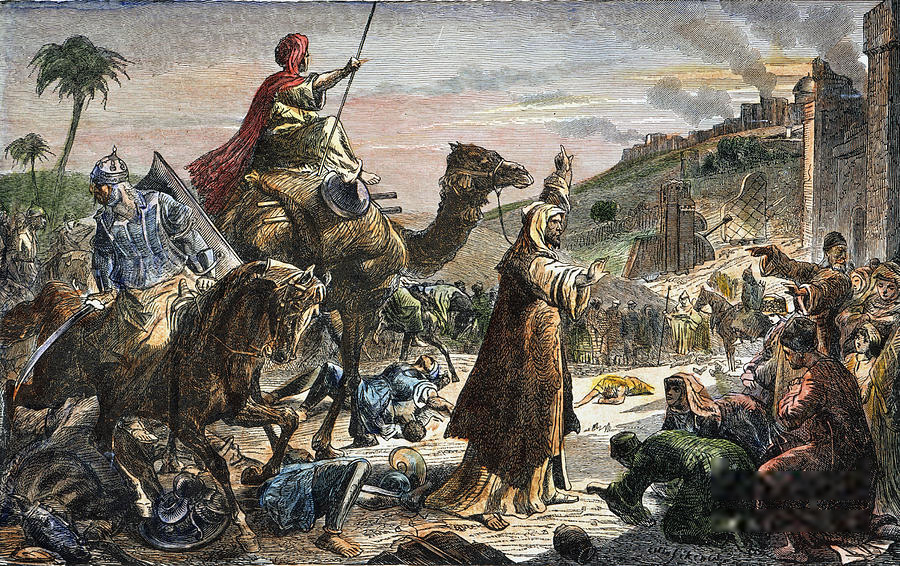
19th-century colored engraving depicting Caliph Umar’s (c. 581?–644) entrance into Jerusalem in 638.

Western scholars' opinions differ on the origins and authenticity of the Pact of Umar. Anver M. Emon observes that "there is intense discussion in the secondary literature" on whether the text dates from the reign of Umar b. al-Khattab (Umar I) or was "a later invention retroactively associated with Umar … to endow the contract of dhimma with greater normative weight." Some historians consider the text a compilation that developed over several centuries. Bernard Lewis noted that while Muslim historiographical tradition attributes the regulations to Umar I, the document itself "can hardly be authentic".

The structure of the text is distinctive. It appears in the form of a petition from non-Muslims to Muslim authorities, promising submission in exchange for protection. A. S. Tritton reproduced several versions in Caliphs and Their Non-Muslim Subjects, each beginning with a request for safety "on these conditions" and ending with a pledge of acceptance of the terms. Mark R. Cohen compared the format to other medieval treaties, describing it as "a kind of petition from the losers promising submission in return for a decree of protection."

Different versions of the text identify different addressees. Some are directed to Umar, while others address Muslim generals, such as Abu Ubayda. Cohen notes that, although the Pact attributed to Umar I, "no text of the document can be dated earlier than the tenth or eleventh century." Lewis similarly suggested that some measures associated with the Pact may originally have been introduced under the Umayyad caliph Umar II (r. 717–720).

Several scholars have argued that elements of the text reflect later historical developments. Norman Stillman wrote that "many of the provisions and restrictions of the pact were only elaborated with the passage of time," with some provisions linked to the early conquests and others added later as Muslims settled more permanently. Tritton regarded the Pact as a later construction, citing its absence from other early treaties, while Daniel C. Dennett argued that the version preserved by al-Tabari could represent an authentic early agreement. Abraham P. Bloch maintained that Umar I was a tolerant ruler and that his name was "erroneously associated … with the restrictive Covenant of Omar." Thomas Walker Arnold wrote that the Pact was "in harmony [with Umar’s] kindly consideration for his subjects of another faith," but added that later generations attributed to him additional restrictions.

== Content ==
There are several different versions of the pact that differ both in their language and stipulations.

The pact:

In the Name of Allah, Most Gracious, Most Merciful. This is a document to the servant of Allah `Umar, the Leader of the faithful, from the Christians of such and such city. When you (Muslims) came to us you requested safety for ourselves, children, property and followers of our religion. You made conditions on ourselves that:

- We will neither erect in our areas a monastery, church, or a sanctuary for a monk,
- Nor restore any place of worship that needs restoration,
- Nor use any of them for the purpose of enmity against Muslims.
- We will not prevent any Muslim from resting in our churches whether they come by day or night,
- And we will open the doors [of our houses of worship] for the wayfarer and passerby.
- Those Muslims who come as guests will enjoy boarding and food for three days.
- We will not allow a spy against Muslims into our churches and homes or hide deceit [or betrayal] against Muslims.
- We will not teach our children the Qur'an,
- Publicize practices of Shirk (polytheism),
- Invite anyone to Shirk,
- Or prevent any of our fellows from embracing Islam, if they choose to do so.
- We will respect Muslims, (and)
- Move from the places in which we sit if they choose to sit in them.
- We will not imitate their clothing, caps, turbans, sandals, hairstyles, speech, nicknames and title names,
- Or ride on saddles,
- Or hang swords on the shoulders, collect weapons of any kind, or carry these weapons.
- We will not encrypt our stamps in Arabic,
- Or sell liquor.
- We will have the front of our hair cut,
- Wear our customary clothes wherever we are,
- Wear belts around our waist,
- Refrain from erecting crosses on the outside of our churches,
- Or demonstrating them and our books in public in Muslim fairways and markets.
- We will not sound the bells in our churches, except discretely,
- Or raise our voices while reciting our holy books inside our churches in the presence of Muslims,
- Nor raise our voices [with prayer] at our funerals,
- Or light torches in funeral processions in the fairways of Muslims, or in their markets.
- We will not bury our dead next to Muslim dead,
- Or buy servants who were captured by Muslims.
- We will be guides for Muslims and refrain from breaching their privacy in their homes.
- We will not beat any Muslim.

These are the conditions that we set against ourselves and followers of our religion in return for safety and protection. If we break any of these promises that we set for your benefit against ourselves, then our Dhimmah (promise of protection) is broken and you are allowed to do with us what you are allowed of people of defiance and rebellion.

== See also ==
- Umar's Assurance
- Charter of Medina
- Ashtiname of Muhammad
- Outline of Islam
- Glossary of Islam
- Index of Islam-related articles
- Religio licita
- 1782 Edict of Tolerance
