= Dekhela =

El Dekheila الدخيلة Dekheila
- Location in Egypt
- Coordinates: 31.122762°N 29.818239°E
- Country: Egypt
- Governorate: Alexandria
- City: Alexandria
- Time zone: UTC+2 (EET)
  - Summer (DST): UTC+3 (EEST)
- Website: www.dekheila.com

Dekheila (Arabic: الدخيلة) is a neighborhood in Alexandria, Egypt with a large seaport. It is located 7 miles west of Alexandria and the seaport is an extension of the port located in Alexandria.

Dekheila is the probable location of the ancient Christian monastic complex of the Pempton at the fifth milestone west of Alexandria. There is evidence of a Gaianite community there.

== See also ==
- Neighborhoods in Alexandria
