= Sophronius of Jerusalem =

Patriarch of Jerusalem from 634 to 638

Saint Sophronius
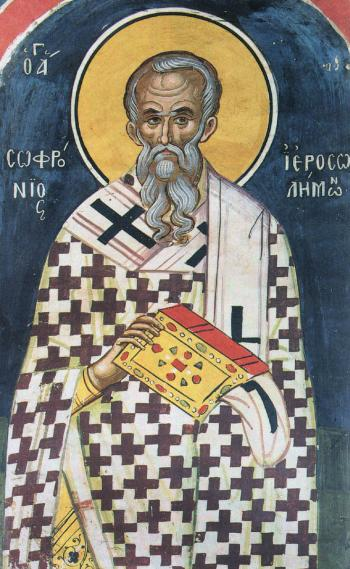
- Athonite fresco icon of Saint Sophronios of Jerusalem, 14th—15th century

Greek Orthodox Patriarchate of Jerusalem
- Born: c. 560; Damascus, Byzantine Empire
- Died: 11 March 638 (aged 77–78); Jerusalem, Rashidun Caliphate
- Venerated in: Eastern Orthodox Church; Roman Catholic Church; Lutheran Church
- Feast: 11 March [O.S. 24 March (where the Julian calendar is used)]
- Attributes: Vested as a bishop, with right hand upheld in blessing, holding a Gospel Book or scroll

Sophronius (Ancient Greek: Σωφρόνιος; Arabic: صفرونيوس; c. 560 – 11 March 638), called Sophronius the Sophist, was the Greek Patriarch of the city known as Aelia Capitolina and then Jerusalem from 634 until his death. He is venerated as a saint in the Eastern Orthodox and Catholic Churches. Before rising to the primacy of the See, he was a monk and theologian who was the chief protagonist for orthodox teaching in the doctrinal controversy on the essential nature of Jesus and his volitional acts. He is also renowned for the negotiation of the surrender of Aelia Capitolina to the Rashid caliph Umar in 637/8.

== Travels ==
Sophronius was born in Damascus around 560. He has been claimed to be of Byzantine Greek or Syriac descent. Sophronius became an ascetic in Roman Egypt about 580 and then entered the Monastery of Saint Theodosius near Bethlehem. A teacher of rhetoric, he travelled to monastic centres in Anatolia, Egypt, and Rome. He accompanied the Byzantine chronicler John Moschus, who dedicated to him his celebrated tract on the religious life, Spiritual Meadow (and whose feast day in the Byzantine Rite, 11 March [O.S. 24 March], is shared with Sophronius').

When Moschus died in Rome in 619, Sophronius accompanied the body to Aelia for a monastic burial. He traveled to Alexandria and Constantinople in 633 to try to persuade the respective patriarchs to renounce Monoenergism, a heterodox teaching that espoused a single, divine energy in Christ to the exclusion of a human capacity for choice. Except for his synodal letter for the Third Council of Constantinople, Sophronius' extensive writings on this question are all lost.

== Elected Patriarch ==
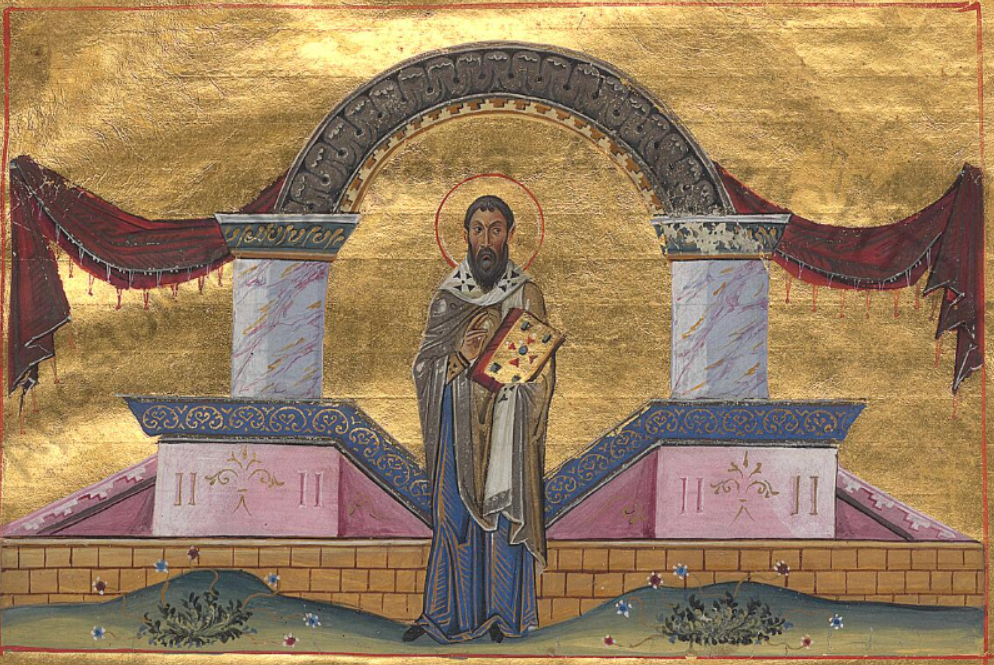
Saint Sophronius of Jerusalem, Menologion of Basil II

Although unsuccessful in his mission to condemn Monoenergism, Sophronius was elected patriarch of Jerusalem in 634. Soon after his enthronement he forwarded his noted synodical letter to Pope Honorius I and to the Eastern patriarchs, explaining the orthodox belief in the two natures, human and divine, of Christ, as opposed to Monoenergism, which he viewed as a subtle form of heretical Monophysitism (which posited a single divine nature for Christ). Moreover, he composed a Florilegium ("Anthology") of some 600 texts from the Early Church Fathers in favour of the Christian tenet of Dyothelitism (positing both human and divine wills in Christ).

== Teachings ==
In his Christmas sermon of 634, Sophronius was more concerned with keeping the clergy in line with Chalcedonian Christianity, giving only the most conventional of warnings of the Muslim advance on Palestine, commenting that they already controlled Bethlehem. Sophronius, who viewed the Muslim control of Palestine as "unwitting representatives of God's inevitable chastisement of weak and wavering Christians", died soon after the fall of Aelia to the caliph Umar in 637, but not before he had negotiated the recognition of civil and religious liberty for Christians in exchange for tribute - an agreement known as Umar's Assurance.

Umar came to Jerusalem and met with the patriarch at the Church of the Holy Sepulchre. Sophronius invited Umar to pray there, but Umar declined, fearing that it would endanger the Church's status. According to the Passion of the 60 Martyrs of Gaza, Sophronius was executed by Amr ibn al-As for baptising Muslim converts in a period of heightened tensions when an earthquake destroyed an early mosque on the Temple Mount. Although it is also said Sophronius died of grief at the fall of his city

In the seven homilies surviving from his brief tenure as Patriarch of Jerusalem, Sophronius taught (in keeping with the Cappadocian theological tradition) that while the Essence of God is ineffable and cannot be seen or beheld by anyone, the energy or power of God, distinct from the Essence is what can be beheld and participated in. Regarding John the Baptist in his Homily on the Baptism of Christ, he states "And when the holy man has done this, straightaway he sees the heavens open and the Spirit descending thence from the Father, not in its own essence—for that is beyond the power of human eyes—but flying down in the form of a dove and lighting on Christ himself, as being of like kind and kin and sharing the same divinity." This theology of the "Essence-Energies Distinction" would be crucial in theological debates in Byzantium in the mid-late Middle Ages, and was one of the theological issues separating the Roman Catholic Church and the Eastern Orthodox Church after the East-West Schism of 1054 AD.

Besides polemics, Sophronius' writings included an encomium on the Alexandrian martyrs Cyrus and John in gratitude for an extraordinary cure of his failing vision. He also wrote 23 anacreontic (classical metre) poems on such themes as the Muslim siege of Jerusalem and on various liturgical celebrations. His Anacreontica 19 and 20 seem to be an expression of the longing desire he had of the Holy City, possibly when he was absent from Jerusalem during one of his many journeys. The order of the two poems has to be inverted to establish a correct sequence of the diverse subjects. Arranged in this way, the two poems describe a complete circuit throughout the most important sanctuaries of Jerusalem at the end of the 6th century, defined as the golden age of Christianity in the Holy Land. Themes of Anacreonticon 20 include the gates of Jerusalem (or Solyma), the Resurrection of Jesus, Calvary, the Constantinian Basilica, Mount Sion, the Praetorium, St. Mary at the Probatica, and Gethsemane. The Mount of Olives, Bethany, and Bethlehem come next in Anacreonticon 19.

Sophronius also wrote the Life of Mary of Egypt, which is read on the fifth Thursday of Lent in the Byzantine Rite.

Religious titles
Preceded by Modestus	Patriarch of Jerusalem; 634–638	Succeeded by Anastasius II (after a period of vacancy)
