= John Moschus =

Byzantine monk and writer (c. 550–619)

Saint John Moschus
- Born: 550; Damascus
- Died: 619; Rome
- Venerated in: Eastern Orthodox Church
- Feast: 11 March [O.S. 24 March (where the Julian calendar is used)]

John Moschus (Greek: Ἰωάννης Μόσχος; c. 550 – 619; name from the Ancient Greek: ὁ τοῦ Μόσχου, romanized: o tou Moschou, lit. 'son of Moschos'), surnamed Eucrates, was a Byzantine monk and ascetical writer of Georgian origin. He is primarily known for his writing of the Spiritual Meadow. The Spiritual Meadow, alongside the Bibliotheca of Photios, are the main sources from which his life is known.

== Biography ==
He was born about 550, probably at Damascus. He was given the epithet "ὁ ἐγκρατής" ("The Abstemious"). He lived successively with the monks at the monastery of St. Theodosius southeast of Jerusalem, among the hermits in the Jordan Valley, and in the New Lavra of St Sabbas the Sanctified near Teqoa, east of Bethlehem.

About the year 578 he went to Egypt with Sophronius (afterwards Patriarch of Jerusalem) and came as far as the Great Oasis of the Libyan Desert. After 583 he came to Mount Sinai and spent about ten years in the Lavra of the Aeliotes, he then visited the monasteries near Jerusalem and the Dead Sea. In the 580s he returned to Egypt to meet refugees at a time when the Byzantine influence on the region had started to wane and where several monasteries in the Wadi El Natrun had been razed by Mazices where 3,500 monks who had lived there had now been dispersed into the Levant. In 604 he went to Antioch but returned to Egypt in 607. Later he went to Cyprus and in 614-615 to Rome, where he died in 619.

On his deathbed he requested Sophronius to bury him, if possible, on Mt. Sinai or else at the Monastery of St. Theodosius near Jerusalem. Mt. Sinai being then invaded by the Saracens, Sophronius buried him at St. Theodosius.

John Moschus' feast day in the Eastern Orthodox Church is shared with that of Sophronius (11 March [O.S. 24 March]).

== Writings ==
=== The Spiritual Meadow ===
He is the author of one of the earliest hagiological works, entitled in Greek Leimōn pneumatikos and known in Latin as Pratum spirituale ("Spiritual Meadow"), occasionally abbreviated "Prat. Spirit.", also quoted as the Leimonarion, or as the "New Paradise", which he wrote during the 610s. In it he narrates his personal experiences with many great ascetics whom he met during his extensive travels, mainly through Palestine, Sinai and Egypt, but also Kilikia and Syria, and repeats the edifying stories which these ascetics related to him.

The work teems with miracles and ecstatic visions and it gives a clear insight into the practices of Eastern monasticism, contains important data on the religious cult and ceremonies of the time, and acquaints us with the numerous heresies that threatened to disrupt the Church in the East.

It was first edited by Fronton du Duc in Auctarium biblioth. patrum, II (Paris, 1624), 1057–1159. A better edition was brought out by Cotelier in Ecclesiae Graecae Monumenta, II (Paris, 1681), which is reprinted in J.-P. Migne, Patrologia Graeca. LXXXVII, III, 2851–3112. A Latin translation, by Ambrose Traversari, is printed in Migne, Patrologia Latina, LXXIV, 121–240, and an Italian version made from the Latin of Traversari (Venice, 1475; Vicenzo, 1479).

=== The vita of John the Almoner ===
Conjointly with Sophronius, Moschus wrote a life of John the Almoner, a fragment of which is preserved in the first chapter of the "Vita S. Joanni Eleemosynarii" by Leontios of Neapolis, under the name of Simeon Metaphrastes (P.G., CXIV, 895-966).

== See also ==
- From the Holy Mountain, book by William Dalrymple
