= List of principals of King's College London =

This is a list of Principals of King's College London. The office of the Principal (Principal and President from 2009) is established by the Charter of King's College London as "the chief academic and administrative officer of the College". To date there have been 20 Principals, with two further announced holders of the role.

No.	Principal	Portrait	Held Office	Notes	Reference
1	William Otter		1831–1836	Bishop of Chichester 1836–1840	
2	Hugh James Rose		1836–1838		
3	John Lonsdale		1838–1843	Bishop of Lichfield 1843–1967	
4	Richard William Jelf		1843–1868		
5	Alfred Barry		1868–1883	Bishop of Sydney 1884–1889	
6	Henry Wace		1883–1897	Dean of Canterbury 1903–1924	
7	Archibald Robertson		1897–1903	Bishop of Exeter 1903–1916	
8	Arthur Headlam		1903–1912	First Dean of King's College London 1908–1912; Bishop of Gloucester 1923–1945	
9	Ronald Montagu Burrows		1913–1920	First layman	
10	Ernest Barker		1920–1927		
11	William Reginald Halliday		1928–1952		
12	Peter Noble		1952–1968		
13	John Hackett		1968–1975		
14	Richard Way		1975–1980		
15	Neil Cameron		1980–1985	Former Chief of the Air Staff and Chief of the Defence Staff	
16	Stewart Sutherland		1985–1990		
17	John Beynon		1990–1992		
18	Arthur Lucas		1993–2003		
19	Rick Trainor		2004–2014		
20	Ed Byrne		2014–31 January 2021		
—	Evelyn Welch		1 February 2021–1 June 2021	Interim President & Principal	
21	Shitij Kapur		1 June 2021–present		
