= Paul the Jew =

Patriarch of Antioch from 519 to 521

- Patriarch of Antioch and All the East
- Church: Greek Orthodox Church of Antioch
- See: Antioch
- Installed: 519
- Term ended: 521
- Predecessor: Severus I
- Successor: Euphrasius

Personal details
- Born: Constantinople, Eastern Roman Empire (modern-day Istanbul, Turkey)
- Died: 521

Paul the Jew was the Patriarch of Antioch from 519 to 521.

== Biography ==
Paul was born in Constantinople, where he became a priest and chief administrator of the Hospice of Euboulos. Paul was consecrated Patriarch of Antioch by the end of June 519. He was consecrated in Antioch on the insistence of Pope Hormisdas, despite initial plans to consecrate Paul in Constantinople. The Church of Antioch suffered from a lack of funds at this time, and thus Emperor Justin I bestowed upon Paul a large amount of money for the maintenance of the Church.

After his ascension to the throne, Emperor Justin I ordered bishops within the Diocese of the East to accept the Council of Chalcedon or face deposition. In November 519, with the aid of the imperial army, the patriarch had Paul, Bishop of Edessa, who had refused to accept the council, forcibly removed from his church, despite the protestations of the local population, and exiled to Seleucia in Syria. Fearing civil unrest, Emperor Justin I restored Paul to the see of Edessa after forty days. According to John of Ephesus, Paul carried out assassinations and torture during his tenure as patriarch.

Paul's persecution towards non-Chalcedonians earned him the cognomen, "the Jew". He ordered non-Chalcedonian monks on the fringe of the Syrian Desert to sign a declaration of acceptance of the Council of Chalcedon, and those who failed to do so were threatened with removal from their monasteries. The majority of monks refused to accept the council, and thus Paul had the army led by Asclepius sent to dislocate the monks. The resulting violence led Emperor Justin I to depose Paul in 521, who died shortly afterwards.

== Bibliography ==
- Allen, Pauline (2011). "Episcopal Succession in Antioch in the Sixth Century". Episcopal Elections in Late Antiquity. Walter de Gruyter. ISBN 9783110268553.
- Evans, J. A. S. (2000). The Age of Justinian: The Circumstances of Imperial Power. Routledge.
- Gwynn, John (1911). "Paulus Edessenus" . In Wace, Henry; Piercy, William C. (eds.). Dictionary of Christian Biography and Literature to the End of the Sixth Century (3rd ed.). London: John Murray.
- Tate, Georges (2004). Justinien. L'épopée de l'Empire d'Orient (527-565). Fayard.
- Viezure, Dana luliana (2011). "The Election of Paul the Jew (519) in Light of the Theopaschite Controversy". Episcopal Elections in Late Antiquity. Walter de Gruyter. ISBN 9783110268553.

Preceded by Severus I	Greek Orthodox Patriarch of Antioch; 519–521	Succeeded by Euphrasius
