= Ed Byrne (neuroscientist) =

Australian neuroscientist and academic administrator (born 1952)

Sir Ed Byrne AC FTSE FRCP FRCPE FRACP
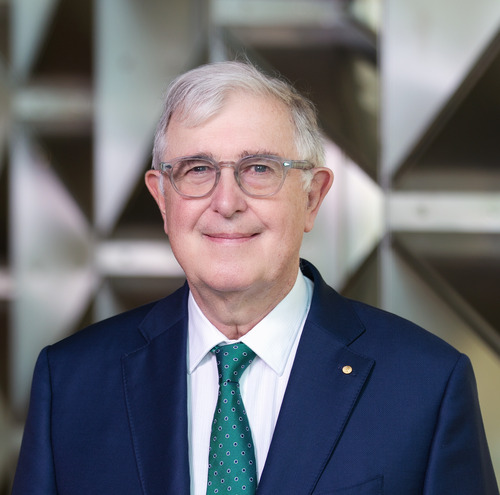
- Byrne in 2024

4th President of the King Abdullah University of Science and Technology
- Incumbent
- Assumed office 1 September 2024
- President: King Abdullah University of Science and Technology
- Preceded by: Tony F. Chan

20th Principal of King's College London
- In office 2014–2021
- Preceded by: Rick Trainor
- Succeeded by: Shitij Kapur

8th Vice-Chancellor of Monash University
- In office 2009–2014
- Preceded by: Richard Larkins
- Succeeded by: Margaret Gardner

Personal details
- Born: Edward Byrne; 15 February 1952 (age 74)
- Education: University of Tasmania; University of Queensland

Academic work
- Institutions: University of Melbourne; Monash University; University College London; King's College London; KAUST

Sir Edward Byrne AC (born 15 February 1952) is an Australian neuroscientist and neurologist. As of September 2024, he serves as the 4th President of King Abdullah University of Science and Technology and Chief Academic Officer of (KAUST), located in Thuwal, Saudi Arabia. Byrne served as 20th President and Principal of King's College London from August 2014 until January 2021 and was previously 8th President Vice-Chancellor of Monash University.

== Early life and education ==
Born 15 February 1952, Byrne grew up in northeast England, the son of a general practitioner, and moved to Australia at the age of 15. He studied medicine at the University of Tasmania, graduating with a Bachelor of Medical Science (BMedSc) in 1971, Bachelor of Medicine, Bachelor of Surgery (MBBS) with First Class Honours in 1974, and a Doctor of Medicine (MD) in 1982. Byrne also holds a Master of Business Administration (MBA) from the University of Queensland, a Diploma in Clinical Science from the University of Adelaide and a Doctor of Science (ScD) from the University of Melbourne.

Byrne is a Fellow of the Royal Australasian College of Physicians, the Royal College of Physicians of Edinburgh, the Royal College of Physicians, the American Academy of Neurology and the Australian Academy of Technological Sciences and Engineering, and a Senior Fellow of the American Neurological Association.

== Professional career ==
Byrne's career in neuroscience combined prominent work as both a researcher and clinician. His career began in Adelaide, South Australia, as Neurology Registrar at the Royal Adelaide Hospital in 1978. In 1979, he left Australia to undertake a research fellowship in clinical neurology in London.

He returned to Australia to become Director of Neurology at St Vincent's Hospital, Melbourne in 1983. In 1993, he became Founding Director of the Melbourne Neuromuscular Research Unit and later the Centre for Neuroscience, going on to become Professor of Clinical Neurology in 1992 and Experimental Neurology at the University of Melbourne in 2001.

His contribution to neuroscience has been particularly strong in mitochondrial disease. In 2006, his work was recognised when he was appointed an Officer of the Order of Australia.

Byrne first went to Monash University in 2003, when he was made Dean of its Faculty of Medicine, Nursing and Health Sciences, a role he held until 2007. He then returned to the UK, where he became Vice-Provost (Health) at University College London (initially serving as Dean of its Faculty of Biomedical Sciences and Head of its School of Medicine).

In 2009, Monash University announced that Byrne would replace Richard Larkins, its outgoing Vice-Chancellor. Immediately upon his appointment, Byrne undertook a restructuring of the university's management and administration, placing the ten faculties into four "clusters". The aim of this was to encourage inter-disciplinary collaboration and reduce duplication across faculties (cutting administrative costs).

Byrne stated that, in his term as Vice-Chancellor, he wanted Monash to consolidate and increase the research output of its international campuses in Malaysia and South Africa, and its graduate academy in India, tapping into regional research funding.

He led the establishment of the Monash campus in Suzhou, China in collaboration with South East University, championed close links with Peking University and led a global alliance between Monash and Warwick universities with Nigel Thrift. In his time as vice-chancellor, Monash University consolidated a position as a top 100 research university. Monash's engagement in South Africa was strengthened by a partnership with the Laureate group.

In 2014, Byrne was appointed a guest professor by Peking University Health Science Center (PUHSC). He was also made an Honorary Citizen for Jiangsu Province, China, in September 2014. In September 2014, Byrne was appointed Principal and President of King's College London. Byrne served as Global Chief Medical Advisor for the Ramsay Health Care Group from 2021 to 2024.

In September 2024, Byrne assumed the role of President of King Abdullah University of Science and Technology (KAUST).

In addition to his role in universities and medical research, Byrne has served on the boards of various commercial biomedical enterprises, including Cochlear and BUPA. He is a member of the Patrons Council of the Epilepsy Foundation of Victoria.He was Chair of Council for the Association of Commonwealth Universities (ACU) from 2019 to 2021.

== Other ==
In his personal life he has a keen interest in fly fishing and classical music and poetry.

He has published four books of poetry through Melbourne University Press.

== Honours ==
On 26 January 2006, Byrne was appointed an Officer of the Order of Australia (AO) for service to neurology as a clinician and academic and to advances in medical research, particularly in the area of mitochondrial muscle disease.

On 26 January 2014, Byrne was appointed a Companion of the Order of Australia (AC) for eminent service to tertiary education, particularly through leadership and governance roles with Monash University, to biomedical teaching and research, as a scientist and academic mentor, and as a contributor to improved global health.

Byrne was awarded an Honorary Doctor of Science by the University of Warwick in July 2013, and an Honorary Doctor of Medicine by the University of Adelaide in August 2014. He is also a recipient of the Queens Square Prize for Neurological Research of the UCL Institute of Neurology and is an Emeritus Professor of Monash University.

In 2015, Byrne was awarded an Honorary Doctor of Science from Western University and was made an Honorary Fellow of the Australian Academy of Health and Medical Sciences (AAHMS).

In 2017, Byrne became an Honorary Professor at Peking University Health Science Center and a Distinguished Visiting Professor at Tsinghua University. He was also awarded an Honorary Doctor of Laws by Monash University in 2017.

In 2019, Byrne was awarded a Doctor of Medical Science (Honoris Causa) from the University of Sydney and was elected to the Academy of Medical Sciences (UK).

Byrne is Emeritus Professor of Neurology, King’s College London and Emeritus Professor of Medicine, Monash University.

From 2021 to 2024, he served as Distinguished Vice-Chancellor’s Fellow at the Australian National University (ANU).

He was knighted in the 2020 Birthday Honours for services to higher education.

Academic offices
Preceded by Richard Larkins	Vice-Chancellor of Monash University; 2009–2014	Succeeded by Margaret Gardner
Preceded by Sir Rick Trainor	Principal of King's College London; 2014–2021	Succeeded by Shitij Kapur
