= Ephraim of Antioch =

Patriarch of Antioch from 527 to 545

Saint Ephraim of Antioch

Patriarch of Antioch and All the East
- Born: c. 5th century AD; Amida, Eastern Roman Empire(modern-day Diyarbakır, Turkey)
- Died: 8 June 545 AD; Antioch, Coele Syria, Eastern Roman Empire (now Antakya, Hatay Province, Turkey)
- Venerated in: Eastern Orthodox Church, Roman Catholic Church
- Feast: 8 June

Saint Ephraim of Antioch (Greek: Άγιος Εφραίμ ο Αντιοχείας, born c. 5th century AD - died 8 June 545 AD), also known as Saint Ephraim of Amida (Greek: Άγιος Εφραίμ o Ἀμίδιος, Syriac: ܐܦܪܝܡ ܐܡܕܝܐ), was the Patriarch of Antioch, and head of the Greek Orthodox Church of Antioch, from 527 until his death in 545. He is venerated as a saint in the Eastern Orthodox and Catholic Churches. His feast day is 8 June.

== Biography ==
=== Early life ===
Ephraim was the son of a certain Appianus, and was born in the city of Amida in the fifth century, where he became fluent in both Greek and Syriac. Ephraim was later employed in the civil government, and served as a military general during the reigns of Emperor Anastasius and his successor Emperor Justin I. In 522, Ephraim was appointed comes Orientis by Emperor Justin and undertook stern measures against the Blues, a chariot racing faction, who had rioted earlier that year. Rioting within the city ceased as a result of Ephraim's actions, and, in 524/525, he was bestowed the honorary title of comes sacrarum largitionum, thus granting him admission to the senate. Ephraim carried out building works in Antioch in November 524 or February, June or July 525.

In late 525, Ephraim was replaced by Anatolius, but was re-appointed comes Orientis by 29 May 526, at which time an earthquake struck Antioch. Ephraim began reconstruction of the city, during which he saw a pillar of fire rise from a sleeping stone-cutter to the sky. The saint awoke the stone-cutter who revealed he had formerly been a bishop and prophesied that Ephraim would become Patriarch of Antioch. Ephraim's efforts to rebuild the city earned him the affinity of the people of Antioch and many called for him to succeed Euphrasius as patriarch, as he had died in the earthquake of 526. At the request of the people of Antioch, Ephraim became a monk, and was consecrated Patriarch of Antioch in April/May 527.

=== Patriarch of Antioch ===
In 528, Antioch was struck by another earthquake, during which under 5000 people were killed, and the saint helped to rebuild the city once more. Antioch continued to suffer earthquakes and many fled the city, however, Ephraim commanded the people to write "May Christ be with us" over the doors of their houses. The earthquake subsequently stopped, and thus Antioch was called Theopolis (city of God). Al-Mundhir III, King of the Lakhmids, invaded Syria and enslaved a number of prisoners in 529, and in the following year the prisoners appealed to Ephraim who paid their ransom. Non-Chalcedonians rioted in Antioch in 531 and attacked the patriarchal palace, but were driven off by the comes Orientis. Ephraim wrote to Anthimus, Archbishop of Trebizond, prior to his consecration as patriarch of Constantinople on the natures of Christ and the heresy of Eutychianism, and reminded him of the importance of the Council of Chalcedon. Later, Anthimus became patriarch in 535 and adopted non-Chalcedonianism, which led Ephraim to send Sergius of Reshaina with a letter to Rome to meet with Pope Agapetus I and warn him that non-Chalcedonians had secured control of the Churches of Alexandria and Constantinople. Agapetus consequently intervened and Anthimus was deposed in 536.

After Emperor Justinian I issued an edict banning the writings of Severus of Antioch in August 536, the saint undertook a tour of Syria and Mesopotamia alongside a contingent of soldiers to enforce the Council of Chalcedon and persecute its opponents, and travelled to Chalcis, Beroea, Hierapolis, Batnae, Edessa, Sura, Callinicum, Theodosioupolis, Constantina, and Amida. Ephraim had non-Chalcedonian monks driven out from their monasteries in the middle of winter, imprisoned those who refused to accept the council, and erected pyres in some cases. According to his hagiography, Ephraim met with a non-Chalcedonian stylite near the city of Hierapolis or Heracleia and attempted to convert him, however, the stylite was unconvinced. The stylite built a bonfire and argued he and the saint should both enter the bonfire to test who was right, to which Ephraim put his omophorion in the fire. After three hours, the omophorion was removed from the bonfire unharmed and the stylite renounced his heresy. Ephraim sent his brother John, a satrap of an Armenian principality, to Amida to convince non-Chalcedonian monks to accept the Council of Chalcedon, however, they refused and John was forced to expel them from the city.

At this time, according to Michael the Syrian, Ephraim was sent as an ambassador to Al-Harith ibn Jabalah, King of the Ghassanids by Emperor Justinian I, and unsuccessfully attempted to persuade the king to accept the Council of Chalcedon. In 537, Ephraim conspired to imprison the non-Chalcedonian clergyman John of Tella, who had taken refuge in the Sassanian Empire, and thus allegedly told the Sassanian government that John had committed simony and was a rebel. The Sasanian government captured John and transferred him to Ephraim, who subsequently humiliated and imprisoned John at Antioch, where he died in 538. In 537/538, Ephraim held a synod at Antioch, which was attended by 132 bishops, and declared his approval of the synod held at Constantinople in 536 and condemned Severus of Antioch. Syncleticus, Archbishop of Tarsus, and his syncellus Stephen, who were suspected of adherence to Eutychianism, were considered by the synod, but were acquitted after a confession of faith.

Eruption of war between the Sassanians and Romans led Antioch to come under siege by Sassanian forces in 540. Ephraim unsuccessfully attempted to pay the Sassanians to relieve their siege on several occasions, however, the Sassanians seized the city and Ephraim fled to Cilicia, where he remained until the Romans retook Antioch. The cathedral of Antioch and its buildings were spared destruction after Ephraim paid the Sassanian forces in precious objects. In 542, Ephraim travelled to Jerusalem, where he met with six Sabaite monks who had been expelled from their monasteries by Origenists. The monks appealed to the saint to act against Origenism. Ephraim then attended the Synod of Gaza alongside Hypatius, Archbishop of Ephesus, and Patriarch Peter of Jerusalem and condemned and deposed Patriarch Paul of Alexandria.

Ephraim held a synod at Antioch in 542 in which he condemned Origen and supporters of his doctrines. In an attempt to heal the rift between supporters and opponents of the council of Chalcedon, Emperor Justinian I issued an edict in late 543 or early 544 that condemned the so-called Three Chapters, thus beginning the Three-Chapter Controversy. The saint initially refused to agree to the edict, however, the emperor threatened Ephraim with deposition, after which he agreed to condemn the Three Chapters, and wrote to Pope Vigilius to declare he had only agreed under force. Ephraim died in the following year.

== Bibliography ==
- Allen, Pauline (2011). "Episcopal Succession in Antioch in the Sixth Century". Episcopal Elections in Late Antiquity. Walter de Gruyter. ISBN 9783110268553.
- Allen, Pauline; Neil, Bronwen (2013). Crisis Management in Late Antiquity (410–590 CE): A Survey of the Evidence from Episcopal Letters. BRILL. ISBN 9789004254824.
- Bacchus, F.J. (1912). "Three Chapters". The Catholic Encyclopedia. New York: Robert Appleton Company.
- Christensen-Ernst, Jørgen (2012). Antioch on the Orontes: A History and a Guide. Hamilton Books. ISBN 9780761858645.
- Downey, Glanville (2015). A History of Antioch in Syria. Princeton University Press. ISBN 9781400877737.
- Gratsiansky, M.V.; Dobrotsvetov, P.K. (2009). "Ephrem". The Orthodox Encyclopedia, vol. 19.
- Grumel, Venance (1958). "La Chronologie I". Traité d'études byzantines. Presses universitaires de France.
- Hefele, Charles Joseph (2007). A History of the Councils of the Church: from the Original Documents, to the close of the Second Council of Nicaea A.D. 787. Wipf and Stock Publishers. ISBN 9781556352478.
- Jones, Arnold Hugh Martin; Martindale, J. R. (1980). The Prosopography of the Later Roman Empire: Volume 2, AD 395–527. Cambridge University Press. ISBN 9780521201599.
- Menze, Volker L. (2008). Justinian and the Making of the Syrian Orthodox Church. Oxford University Press.
- Neale, John Mason (2008). A History of the Holy Eastern Church: The Patriarchate of Antioch. Wipf and Stock Publishers. ISBN 9781606083307.
- Shahîd, Irfan (1995). Byzantium and the Arabs in the Sixth Century, Volume 1. Dumbarton Oaks. ISBN 9780884022145.
- Tate, Georges (2004). Justinien. L'épopée de l'Empire d'Orient (527-565). Fayard.
- Torrance, Iain (1998). Christology After Chalcedon: Severus of Antioch and Sergius the Monophysite. Wipf and Stock Publishers. ISBN 9781579101107.
- Van Rompay, Lucas (2005). "Society and Community in the Christian East". The Cambridge Companion to the Age of Justinian. Cambridge University Press.
- Venables, Edmund (1911). "Ephraim (6), bp. of Antioch and patriarch" . In Wace, Henry; Piercy, William C. (eds.). Dictionary of Christian Biography and Literature to the End of the Sixth Century (3rd ed.). London: John Murray.

Preceded by Euphrasius	Greek Orthodox Patriarch of Antioch; 527–545	Succeeded by Domnus III
