= Carta Jerusalem =

Israeli publisher

- Status: Active
- Founded: 1958
- Country of origin: Israel
- Headquarters location: Jerusalem
- Distribution: Hendrickson Publishers (US); Marston Book Services (UK)
- Publication types: Maps, Atlases
- Nonfiction topics: Bible, Holy Land and the Scriptures, Jerusalem and Religion
- Official website: carta-jerusalem.com

Carta Jerusalem (Hebrew: הוצאת כרטא, "Carta, The Israel Map & Publishing Company, Ltd") is an Israeli publisher of atlases and maps, primarily of biblical topics. Founded in 1958, it is the principal publisher of cartographic material in Israel. Carta publishes Israel's national atlas, as well as road maps for motorists, a bilingual gazetteer (The Toponomasticon: The Book of Geographical Names) which uses material from Israel's Survey of Israel geographical database, 1:500,0000 scale maps of Israel and Jordan and a digitized map collection on CDs. An abridged version of the Toponomasticon is also available as part of a 1:100,000 atlas published in 1994.

It is partnered with Hendrickson Publisher for distribution. Hendrickson describes Carta as a, "long-established cartographic firm that holds the world’s largest collection of biblical study materials."

Carta is noted for its historical atlases, including the Historical Atlas of Christianity (2001), Historical Atlas of Islam (2002), and the Historical Atlas of the Jewish People (2003), all published in the U.S. and British Commonwealth by Continuum, and for scholarly translations of significant ancient works, such as Eusebius' Onomasticon (2003).

Carta is also the licensed publisher of the Hebrew edition of the Guinness Book of World Records.
