= Paul of Edessa =

Paul of Edessa (also Pawla of Edessa; died 30 October 526) was the Syriac Orthodox bishop of Edessa from 510 until his death with the exception of two periods of exile in 519 and 522–526.

Paul was consecrated in 510, succeeding Peter. In the first year of his episcopate Paul joined with Gamalinus, bishop of Perrha, against certain sectarians who refused the use of bread, water and wine, except in celebrating the Eucharist. When the Emperor Justin I undertook to force the decrees of the Council of Chalcedon on Severus of Antioch and his followers, he committed the task to Patricius. Patricius arrived at Edessa in November 519, then ordered Paul either to subscribe the council or resign. Paul refused, and took sanctuary in his baptistery; whence he was dragged by Patricius and sentenced to be exiled to Seleucia. Justin, however, hoping to overcome the bishop's resistance, reinstated him after 44 days. But Paul still refused to submit, and was at length deposed and banished to Euchaita in the Pontus in July 522. A later imperial order placed Asclepius in the see.

During his exile, he received a letter of consolation from Jacob of Sarug.

On the death of Asclepius (June 525), Paul "repented" (as the orthodox author of the Chronicon Edessenum states) and submitted to Justinian, then acting for Justin. From him Paul obtained a letter supporting the petition he addressed to Euphrasius, then Patriarch of Antioch, praying to be restored to his see. Paul was accordingly permitted to return to Edessa as bishop in March 526. He survived this his third inauguration less than 8 months, dying on October 30, less than a year before Justin died.

== Sources ==
- This article incorporates text from a publication now in the public domain: Wace, Henry; Piercy, William C., eds. (1911). "Paulus Edessenus". Dictionary of Christian Biography and Literature to the End of the Sixth Century (3rd ed.). London: John Murray.
- Jullien, Christelle; Nicholson, Oliver (2018). "Paul of Edessa (d. 526)". In Oliver Nicholson (ed.). The Oxford Dictionary of Late Antiquity. Vol. 2. Oxford University Press. pp. 1150–51.
- Menze, Volker L. (2008). "Jacob of Sarug, John of Tella and Paul of Edessa: Ecclesiastical Politics in Osrhoene, 519–522". In George Kiraz (ed.). Malphono w-Rabo d-Malphone: Studies in Honor of Sebastian P. Brock. Gorgias Press. pp. 421–438.
- Menze, Volker L. (2008). Justinian and the Making of the Syrian Orthodox Church. Oxford University Press.
