= John of Tella =

Syriac Orthodox bishop (482–538)

Mār John of Tella ܝܘܚܢܢ ܕܬܠܐ
- Bishop of Tella
- Native name: ܝܘܚܢܢ ܒܪ ܩܘܪܣܘܣ
- Church: Syriac Orthodox Church
- Diocese: Tella
- See: Antioch

Orders
- Ordination: 519 AD by Jacob of Serugh, Paul of Edessa, third bishop

Personal details
- Born: Yohanan bar Qursos; 482 AD Callinicum, Osrhoene (modern-day Raqqa, Syria)
- Died: February 6, 538 AD
- Denomination: non-Chalcedonian Christianity

Sainthood
- Feast day: 6 February
- Venerated in: Oriental Orthodox Church

John of Tella (Syriac: ܝܘܚܢܢ ܕܬܠܐ, romanized: Yoḥanān d-Tellā; 482 – 6 February 538), also known as John bar Qursos (Syriac: ܝܘܚܢܢ ܒܪ ܩܘܪܣܘܣ, romanized: Yoḥanān bar Qursos), was a 6th-century Syriac Orthodox bishop, theologian, and ascetic. He is best remembered for preserving the Syriac Orthodox Church during times of severe persecution in the eastern Byzantine Empire, near the Byzantine-Persian frontier, which led to various struggles with Chalcedonian leaders throughout his life.

Born near Callinicum (modern-day Raqqa, Syria), he left his role as monk to become the bishop of Tella (Note: Tella (Syriac: ܬܠܐ ܕܡܘܙܠܬ, romanized: Tella d-Mawzlāt), also called Constantina, was a town between Mardin and Edessa, today a municipality in Şanlıurfa Province.) (modern-day Viranşehir, Turkey). In order to protect the non-Chalcedonian hierarchy from persecution, John organized the ordination of thousands of priests and deacons throughout the eastern provinces of the Byzantine Empire, making him one of the major leaders of the early Miaphysite movement after the Council of Chalcedon. He struggled against various Byzantine emperors and Ephrem of Antioch, the Chalcedonian patriarch, while promoting and preserving the Syriac Orthodox faith and hierarchy during times of severe persecution, until his eventual capture and martyrdom in Antioch in 538.

His writings, composed mainly in Syriac, address ecclesiastical discipline, Eucharistic theology, and pastoral instruction, alongside several lost letters and theological treatises that he wrote. John's works demonstrate a strong dedication to upholding the integrity of the faith and community boundaries against Chalcedonian influence, in addition to the doctrines of Miaphysite Christology and Pauline ecclesiology. His politeia, a network of interconnected clergymen working together in times of persecution, established a long-lasting model of monastic and clerical organization, and his teachings on the Eucharist are considered fundamental in defining Syriac Orthodox theology.

John of Tella is venerated as a "defender of the orthodox faith". His efforts in safeguarding the creed during a time of imperial suppression earned him the title of "true confessor of the faith" within the tradition. The Syriac Orthodox Church commemorates him on 6 February and regards him as one of the most revered figures of early Syriac Christianity in the Oriental Orthodox Communion.

== Life ==
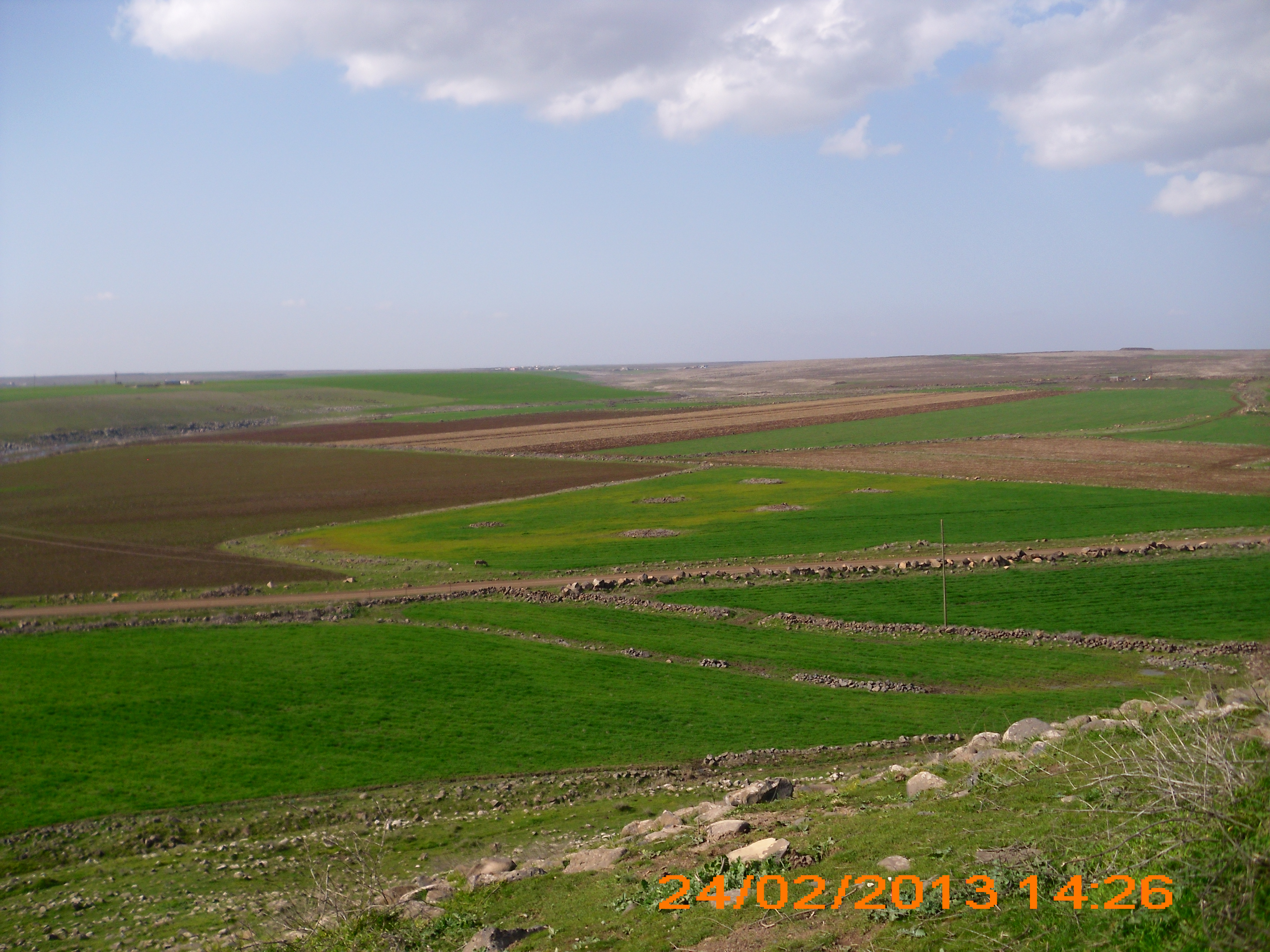
Landscape near Tella, modern-day Viranşehir

Much of what is known about John's life comes from two biographies: a Life by a certain disciple Elias (Syriac: ܐܠܝܐ, a cognate of the Hebrew prophet Elijah's name) and another by John of Ephesus. John bar Qursos was born in 482 AD in Callinicum (modern-day Raqqa, Syria) in the province of Osrhoene along the eastern Euphrates. He came from an affluent family and received a good education in both Greek and Syriac. Although his background prepared him for a career in the Byzantine administration and military, John rejected a formal life in government and instead opted for an ascetic vocation, and in his mid-twenties, he entered the monastery of Mar Zakkai in Callinicum, where he further studied theology and asceticism.

John was ordained bishop of Tella (modern-day Viranşehir, Turkey) by Jacob of Serugh, Paul of Edessa, and a third unnamed bishop. Initially he was reluctant to accept this ordination because he wanted to devote more time to ascetic practices, but eventually yielded to the insistence of Jacob of Serugh. His ordination occurred around 519, during the reign of Emperor Justin I, whose religious policies contrasted with those of his predecessor, Emperor Anastasius I Dicorus. Justin ended the Acacian Schism between Rome and Constantinople and enforced the acceptance of the Council of Chalcedon throughout the Eastern Empire.

Thus, through Justin's policies, imperial force was used to subjugate the native Miaphysite population and compel their acceptance. Many bishops, however, did not consent to this, including John of Tella. When John was ordained bishop of Tella in 519, this violence had not yet reached east of the Euphrates, but two years later, he was forced into exile for refusing to accept Hormisdas's libellus. John surprised the elites in Tella when he refused to comply with Justin's orders, as they had assumed he would simply accept an official imperial policy and move on. Initially returning to Mar Zakkai, he later withdrew into the desert of Marde, where he became reputed for ordaining non-Chalcedonian clergy to address the shortage caused by imperial persecution. His careful vetting of candidates earned him a reputation as a rigorous and principled leader, having ordained approximately 170,000 priests and deacons. Severus of Antioch also appointed him representative of the patriarchate.

By 532, Emperor Justinian I took notice of John's popularity in the East and convened a synod in Constantinople to reconcile Chalcedonians and non-Chalcedonians, which John attended, likely as the head of the latter delegation. John refused to halt his ordinations and declined to submit to imperial demands, which resulted in the failure of the synod.

=== Exile ===
The Byzantine-Persian Frontier in 565 AD, where John spent most of his time teaching and ordaining

The Persian victory over Julian's army in 363 brought many Mesopotamian territories like Nisibis under Persian control. This shift brought hope to the Miaphysite community, which was struggling against the Byzantines' persecution of non-Chalcedonians in the empire, led by Justin and Justinian. Following this persecution, John of Tella lost his episcopal see in 521 and relocated to Persian-controlled territory near the frontier zone, where he continued his pastoral activity and circulated his writings. The final institutional division between the Chalcedonian and non-Chalcedonian hierarchies was facilitated by his missionary and ordination activities in exile, along with those of Jacob Baradeus.

John's actions helped ignite widespread opposition in the eastern provinces when Justin attempted to enforce Chalcedonian policy by dismissing dissident bishops and installing his own imperial appointees in their place. Justin, who thought the East would not be a threat, was shocked when entire cities and monasteries had disobeyed the emperor's order — rather, he found a broad uprising, with thousands of clergymen and entire communities prepared to suffer for their cause. This resistance was sparked by John's leadership, and demonstrated the tenacity of those opposed to Chalcedonian imposition.

John's ministry was especially defined by a long-term struggle with Ephrem of Antioch, whose power encompassed conflicting territorial and ecclesiastical claims. Accusations soon arose from both Byzantine and Persian officials who denounced John as a "evil man" and "worthy of an evil death". Ephrem, whom John of‌ Ephesus calls a "vicious persecutor", collaborated with Persian authorities, using bribery and false testimony to justify a joint Byzantine-Persian raid on John's community in the mountains of Singara. Captured and brought to Nisibis, John was charged with secular violations, as the Persians were unconcerned with ecclesiastical and religious matters; these charges included illegal border crossing, unlawful tax collection, and "rebelling against Caesar and those who rule his land". Thus, John's ministry was exaggerated by his enemies as a full rebellion. John denied all allegations and offered compelling reasons, stating that he followed the emperor's orders but could not compromise his own principles until the emperor ruled "his kingdom according to God's will". Like Ignatius of Antioch, John rejected earthly authority if it contradicted divine law, opting for suffering rather than abandoning his faith.

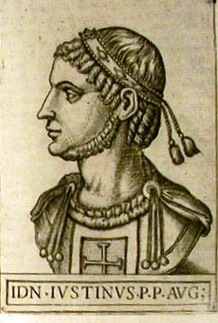
Justin I, a Latin himself, attempted to reconcile the West with the East of his empire by imposing Chalcedonian Christianity on the East, which had largely rejected the Council of Chalcedon

Having successfully defended himself, John convinced the Persian administration of his innocence, and they affirmed his legitimacy in maintaining peace between the two empires by establishing his own Christian politeia in Nisibis with a degree of autonomy. For John, the borders were fictitious and man-made, and the politeia of the empires was idolatrous and worldly. For those who truly valued their faith, the empire's orders should not be followed merely to please the emperor; God held greater significance, despite the hardships they might face in disobeying the emperor.

John and Ephrem were portrayed as polar opposites by the two biographers. While John was made to look moral, Ephrem was corrupt. John of Ephesus and Elias compared John of Tella to Ignatius and Paul, respectively, for challenging imperial authority in the face of persecution to serve God, alongside their shared asceticism and missionary activity. Particularly, Elias often quoted Paul's epistles when describing John, making the two figures nearly identical; the story of John reads like a biography of Paul.

Ephrem, on the other hand — a Syriac Christian from Amida — received a Greek education and rose through the ranks of the Byzantine government, eventually attaining the position of Chalcedonian patriarch of Antioch. He was described as abusing his authority by demolishing monasteries that did not align with him, sending soldiers to destroy them, and neglecting his flock in both empires. Instead, he chose to affiliate himself with the Byzantine government and its laws and judicial system. This stands in contrast to the description of John's politeia in the biographies, which aimed to unite the faithful across borders and cultures, whereas Ephrem maintained the old method of enforcing doctrine as imperial policy through force. In Ephrem's attempt to integrate Syria into Chalcedonian Christianity to preserve Byzantine control, he mainly embraced only the urban regions. To the biographers, Ephrem served not God, but Caesar.

John himself faced numerous accusations and slander. By immersing himself in Syriac literature and language rather than the Greek of the empire — despite the significant geographical and social overlap between the two — he positioned himself closer to the frontier in Mesopotamia, where such language and culture were more prevalent. Therefore, he was branded as treasonous and rebellious against the Byzantines, likened to the nomads with whom he associated. His adversaries accused him of living on camel and donkey meat, wearing a hair shirt, and growing a long beard as an attempt to portray him as nothing more than a savage and a bandit. Byzantine authorities were further unsettled by his growing influence among the largely autonomous frontier populations, whom they regarded as marginal subjects to begin with.

=== Death and legacy ===
Ephrem would later emphasize these accusations when he abducted John to Antioch. This abduction occurred soon after the Great Church was destroyed by an earthquake in 526. Ephrem's plan was to rebuild the cathedral and hold a grand council there to excommunicate Severus and other non-Chalcedonians. This display of grandiosity aimed to legitimize his position as patriarch and Byzantine official, promising to erect a church for the faithful in contrast with John, who fled to live in the wilderness. To John, however, his church was not a physical one, but a spiritual one.

Ephrem was generally focused on outward displays of grandeur by building churches and dismantling those he deemed heretical. His actions reinforced the notion that his church in Antioch was the legitimate one, not the "rogue" one to the east, which existed solely on imperial approval rather than the will of the people whom John had won through his example and charisma. John's churches did not need to be grand in earthly terms; it was his politeia of the Miaphysites that mattered.

With the help of the Persians, the Chalcedonian imperial party captured John in the Sinjar mountains in early February 537. He was taken to Antioch, where Ephrem and his cohorts mistreated John while he was imprisoned at the age of 55, deliberately humiliating him. John died a year later on February 6, 538.

The glory that Antioch enjoyed under Ephrem was soon cut short after the death of John, when the Persians sacked Antioch and brought its treasures to Assyria, rebuilding a new "Antioch" near Ctesiphon. Elias and other non-Chalcedonians characterized these invasions as God's punishment for the wickedness of the empire and the Chalcedonians, drawing parallels to the Old Testament Assyrians who also attacked God's people, the Israelites, for their wickedness. The Persians were figuratively seen as God's "wrath", signifying a break in the covenant between God and the Chalcedonians; this, however, is not a literal description of the Persians, but rather a biblical allusion, not to the actual Assyrians whose identity and traditions survived in the Adiabene region at that time.

Decades earlier, Severus had issued a homily explaining that this festival of renewal was not to be celebrated for the physical erection of a "visible church", but for the turning away of souls from ignorance to the light of Christ. Ephrem, who displayed actions contrary to Severus, broke this principle, which led to this church being destroyed during his reign. His church, maintained by military force and the subjugation of locals, also became a victim of violence. Meanwhile, John's politeia is described to have thrived, sanctioned by God against His enemies. The grandiose gestures dissipated, while the Church flourished in the minds of the Miaphysites.

== Writings ==
John of Tella wrote many works during his life in exile. Most of his writings consist of instructions and exhortations addressed to his clergy and followers during the height of imperial persecution.

=== Politeia ===
John of Tella developed and organized what he called a politeia (Syriac: ܦܘܠܝܛܝܐ) — a Greek loanword that may be translated as "commonwealth", "constitution", or "way of life". In John's context, it referred to his network of monks and priests functioning as a unified corporate society of faith, a structure that continued among his followers after his death. The concept of politeia in John's writings has been interpreted in various ways, often understood as the "politeia of the faithful faction", an ecclesiastical system established to maintain clerical unity and continuity during his exile.

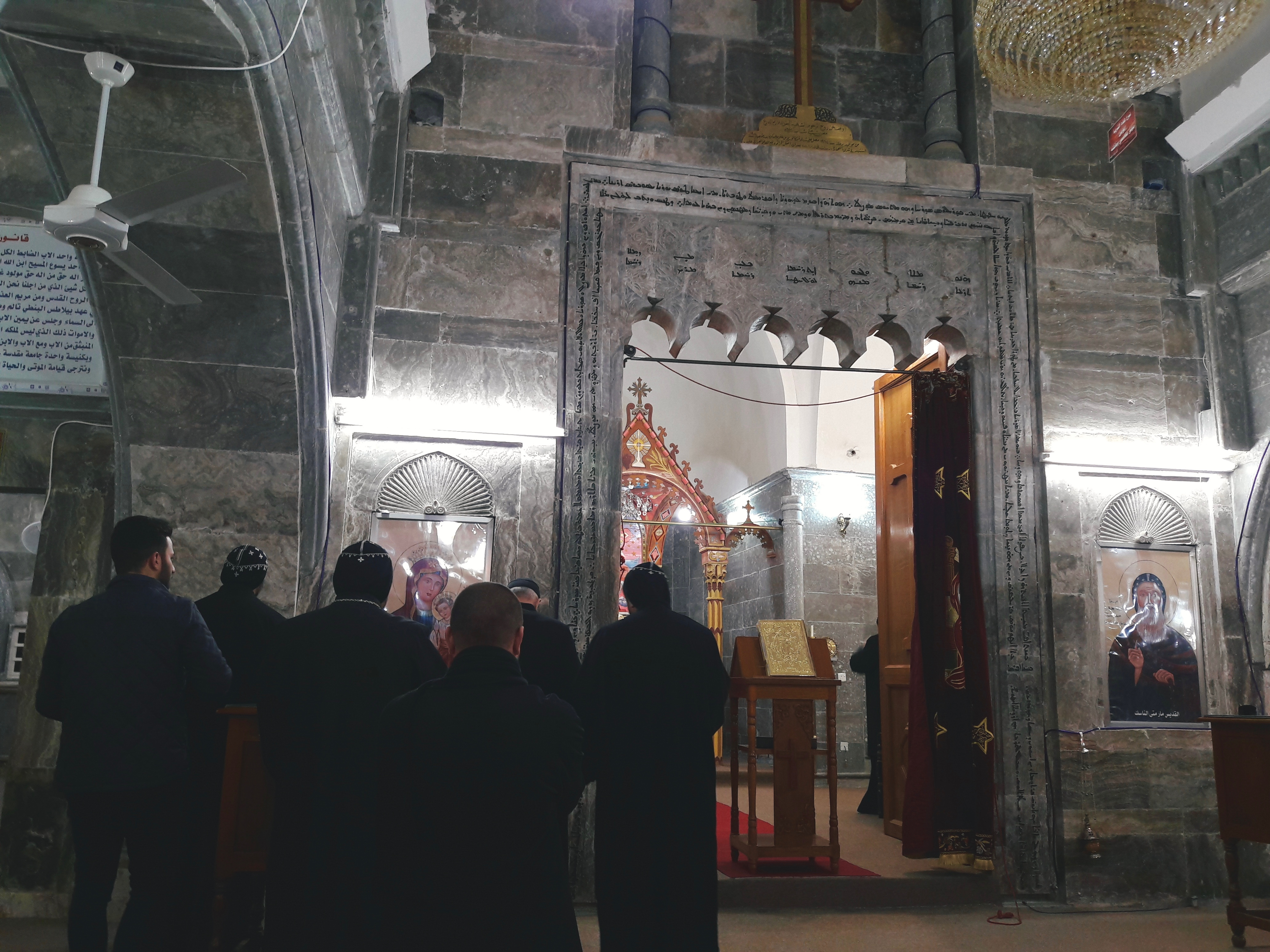
Monks at the Syriac Orthodox Monastery of Mor Mattai, Iraq, a region where John's politeia — the hallmark of his treatises — flourished

Several traditions served as the model for John's politeia. Community fellowship and the moral responsibilities of the citizen within the city-state were central to the Greek philosophical background, as found in Plato and Aristotle. Another example from Jewish literature was Josephus, who hailed Moses's politeia as the ideal social structure. Early Christian writers, adapting these ideas, presented the Christian politeia as morally and spiritually superior to pagan or Jewish models. After the conversion of Constantine, monastics further employed the term to distinguish their ascetic way of life from that of lay Christians.

Preachers used the concept of politeia to encourage the faithful to uphold a Christian lifestyle; in doing so, the sense of community becomes individualized for each person while still belonging to a larger community that shares these values, despite individual variations. Eusebius of Caesaria describes Jesus Christ "during the times of his incarnate politeia", where His human nature possessed the qualities of being like other humans while also embodying a united Divine nature. Thus, politeia has come to delineate the differences between various communities, elevating certain practices in contrast to surrounding ones with inferior traditions. Its usage by John's followers encapsulates these meanings, defining their community as superior to others, including heterodox groups, heathens, laypeople, and the Byzantine and Persian imperial systems, all while adhering to orthodoxy and asceticism as alternatives to worldly politeiai in favor of a more spiritual one. The writings of his followers contain instructions for priests to maintain behaviors that distinguish them from others, whether they be heretics or their laymen flock.

The main purpose of John's politeia was to preserve doctrinal purity within his clerical network, ensuring continued adherence to the theological positions of Severus of Antioch and Philoxenus of Mabbug (as the Syriac Orthodox Church currently does) while rejecting both Chalcedonian Christology with its Tome of Leo and Julianism. For ascetic clergy, his regulations offered helpful advice on proper conduct and appearance, usury avoidance, diet, and interactions with women. In order to avoid simony, John further regulated priestly donations, which alarmed Sassanid authorities.

This model of politeia was strongly supported by Severus of Antioch, who often corresponded with John. He compared it to the remaining 7,000 Israelites that God had preserved during Prophet Elijah's time. Severus likened the "idolaters" of the Roman and Sassanid empires to those condemned by Elijah, thus celebrating John's clergy as a faithful remnant of orthodoxy. The word politeia appears frequently in Syriac translations of Severus's letters which indicates that the Greek originals also contained it. One such example is a letter addressed to a certain Simeon, archimandrite of the monastery of Teleda, telling him that "it befits [his] politeia" to be included in the community of orthodox clergymen; this letter mirrors the patience exhibited by Israelite kings, suggesting that he should also embody patience while emphasizing his role as a model for his community. Another example is found in a letter that describes the Mosaic laws that the Jews were required to abide by against the laws of external emperors that were not of God. Hence, Severus stressed that these earthly religious leaders should stand firm and not yield to the demands of emperors while remaining steadfast under persecution, just as the Israelites were instructed not to associate with pagans and idolators.

A recurring theme in the writings of Severus, John, and their followers is the rejection of imperial religious coercion by both the Byzantine and Persian states, the faithful urged to stand firm under persecution and to prioritize divine command over imperial law. Severus strongly endorsed John's ordinations and urged him to gather Miaphysites from far and wide, including Persia (noting that Elias may have been referring to Persian-controlled Mesopotamian towns) and Armenia, who would return to their home parishes after ordination.

John's politeia also sought to maintain clear distinctions between orthodoxy and heresy by outlining the problems along the Byzantine-Persian frontier where diverse Christian communities intermingled. He expressed concern that contact with the nearby Church of the East might lead to the adoption of its liturgical vessels and practices. Instead, he preferred to integrate Arabs and other nomads into the Miaphysite communion rather than commune Chalcedonians. By bringing anti-Chalcedonian Christians together across linguistic and imperial divides into a single ecclesiastical structure, John was able to transcend political boundaries. Later, John of Ephesus would describe John of Tella's deeds as preceding those of Jacob Baradaeus.

John faced charges of treason for continuing to ordain priests, bishops, and deacons in spite of the emperor's prohibition. The emperor had explicitly forbidden him to continue ordinations, but John believed that his mission transcended worldly empires and political frontiers. For him, the politeia was a divine institution — the true commonwealth of the faithful, existing independently of any temporal power.

=== Theology ===
By portraying Chalcedon as a schismatic break from the true Church, similar to the earlier heresies of Arius and Nestorius, John of Tella's theological work was firmly anchored in the defense and consolidation of the Miaphysite tradition. In contrast to the Miaphysites who upheld the Pauline apostolic tradition, he characterized Chalcedonians as followers of Nestorius and that "the Council of Chalcedon did not build upon the foundation which the divine master-builder Paul had laid, but upon the sand which Nestorius, the confounder and the destroyer, had laid".

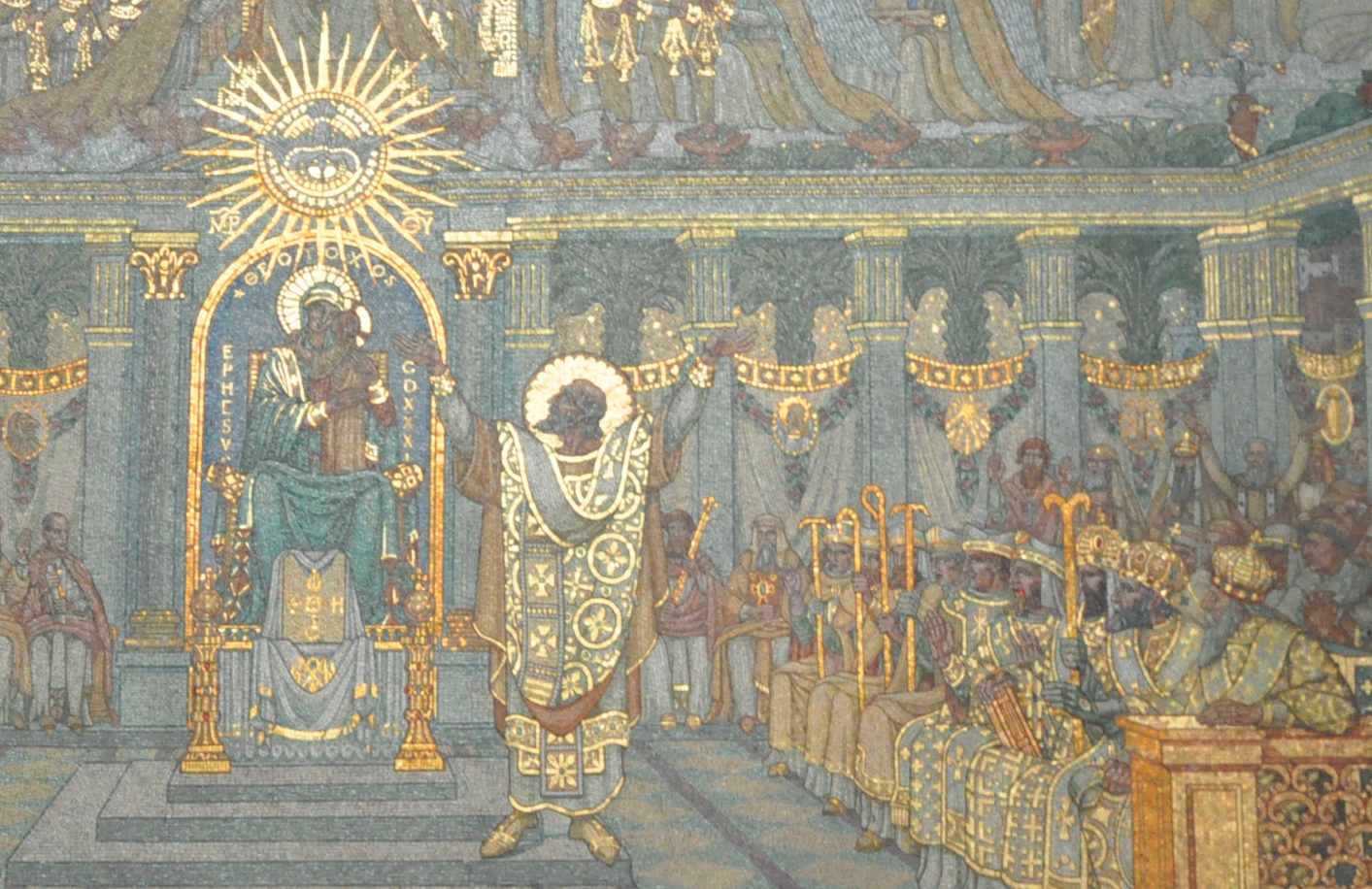
The doctrine of Miaphysitism holds that the natures of Christ, divine and human, are fully united into one composite nature without mixture, confusion, or separation — in contrast to Dyophysitism, which teaches that the two natures persist independently after the union

John offered a positive apologia for the Miaphysite position while critiquing his opponents. He argued that the Tome of Leo greatly divided Christ's human and divine natures, resulting in two separate Persons — one God who walked on water and multiplied the bread, and the other a man who was born and baptized — whereas Cyril's paradigm presented the Incarnate God as a unified entity "without mixture and change". Thus, the Chalcedonians believe in two Sons and a "Quaternity" as opposed to a Trinity. He also included multiple apologias against Julianism, whose followers were also non-Chalcedonian but held different views from Severus's teachings regarding the corruptibility of Christ's body.

John of Tella, along with other anti-Chalcedonian leaders such as Philoxenus of Mabbug, John Rufus, and Severus of Antioch, actively discouraged the faithful from interacting with Chalcedonians, most prominent being John. He propagated the notion that, in the face of expanding Chalcedonian influence, the integrity and exact boundaries of the Miaphysite community needed to be maintained by rigorous separation because heresy could spiritually "pollute" a community if it came into contact with it. This kind of orthodox quarantine is similar to Old Testament prohibitions like the forbidding of Jews to mix with Gentiles, which encouraged the Syriac Orthodox to stay clear of heretics. For John, such separation extended even to ritual objects, including altars and the Eucharist, which had to remain free from association with heretical practices.

John, like Irenaeus before him, also composed a heresiology. An excerpt highlighting this is the following:

Nestorius thought of Him as a man who dwelt in Him, that is, God the Word. Eutyches, as he complied with the doctrine of Mani and of Valentinus, thought of Him in terms of hallucinations and illusions concerning the mystery of the humanization of God the Word, and thus he insulted our Savior. Arius and Eunomius the blasphemers thought of Him as the son of the Creator and of a created woman. They abased the hypostasis of the spirit from the nature of the Godhead. When he tried to show that our Lord was vain and not perfect, Apollinaris blasphemed rashly and said that God the Word was embodied within the mind and the soul. Macedonius ventured iniquitously when he said that the Holy Spirit was utterly not within the nature of the Godhead. Paul of Samosata, Diodore, Theodore, Nestorius, Ibas, Theodoret, the Council of Chalcedon and the Tome of Leo all drank from the one and the same pit of stinking filth.

=== Ecclesiology ===
John preserved apostolic succession and sacramental life within the community by consecrating new clergy throughout the East, whereas Chalcedonian hierarchy expected that the movement would cease to exist when current Miaphysite bishops died. He is known to have ordained almost 170,000 priests and deacons during his ministry.

John placed equal importance on both the quality and the quantity of those he ordained. He kept thorough records of every ordination and personally assessed candidates — Chalcedonians and Miaphysites, both of whom came to him — for their chastity, attentiveness, and pastoral fit. His extensive network of clergy was viewed as a political threat, as evidenced by the fact that Persian authorities later targeted these records. He did not ordain many bishops, as he was afraid of further retribution from the emperor; additionally, bishops were not particularly needed, and any new ordinands would have been targeted just as easily. Furthermore, since, at the time, the Dyophysites had significantly fewer followers than the Miaphysites, his Church required more priests and deacons to actively administer the Eucharist, rather than merely titular bishops.

Chalcedonian bishops frequently accused John of violating Church canons by ordaining clergy outside his jurisdiction. Citing earlier bishops like Eusebius of Samosata who had ordained Basil the Great in times of crisis and was revered by both Chalcedonians and non-Chalcedonians, he justified his actions by affirming that "when there is anarchy, the Church cannot observe the accuracy of the canons". John also pointed to Athanasius of Alexandria, who also ordained numerous clergy outside his jurisdiction during his various exiles. Thus, despite going against the canons, John's actions were still in alignment with orthodoxy.

John's conception of ecclesiology was more Pauline than Petrine. He viewed Paul as his spiritual mentor and patron, whose mission he aimed to imitate in both suffering and tenacity, even though he recognized Peter as the most important of the apostles. John opposed the notion that the Church of God was identical with the imperial Church or that ecclesiastical canons were to be equated with imperial law. Rather, he viewed the early, pre-imperial Church as a model of spiritual authenticity; scholars have since compared this perspective to Nikolai Afanasiev's idea of "Eucharistic ecclesiology". Just as Paul built his Christian communities in opposition to the pagan structures of Rome, John of Tella established a parallel Miaphysite hierarchy in defiance of what he regarded as heretical imperial institutions.

John's understanding of the Church is manifested in his writings and actions. He viewed the Church as the original continuation of the teachings of all the apostles, unified in agreement. His efforts to keep the Eucharistic celebrations alive in the East, even under severe persecution, is indicative of his belief.

=== Eucharist ===
The Eucharist played a crucial role in early and late antique Syriac Christianity, as evidenced by John of Tella's strong emphasis on it. In keeping with Ephrem the Syrian, Philoxenus of Mabbug, and other Syriac Fathers, fire is likened to a lit coal (Syriac: ܓܡܘܪܬܐ, romanized: Gamūrtā) in reference to Isaiah 6:6-7. In this context, the lit coal that touches Isaiah's lips and absolves him from sin is prefigured as the Eucharist.

The Miaphysite community, often persecuted and expelled from monasteries by Chalcedonians, faced challenges in accessing clergy capable of administering valid sacraments (since those of Chalcedonian clergy were considered invalid). John regarded the Eucharist as "the great and most exalted" sacrament, central to the spiritual life of the faithful, and stressed its importance above other rites, including baptism and penitence. He further instructed believers to avoid what he called the "poison of death" represented by the Chalcedonian Eucharist.

=== Diaconate ===
John of Tella devoted much attention to defining the role and duties of deacons within the Church. In his writings, he compares the deacon to an angel, whereby they help mainting the sanctity and integrity of the altar, and assist in the celebration of the Eucharist. These responsibilities were similarly spoken of by Ignatius of Antioch, Justin Martyr, and Aphrahat.

A major concern for John was the proper handling of the Eucharist. The deacon was responsible for ensuring that the quantity of consecrated bread matched the number of communicants so that no consecrated elements would remain unconsumed. John warned that any deacon who consecrated more than necessary risked condemnation, as excess Eucharist could either be desecrated through spoilage or consumed to excess. In cases where surplus occurred, it was to be preserved reverently for the following day. John also criticized certain monks at the Monastery of Mar Zakkai who lived solely on consecrated bread and wine, repeating Rabbula of Edessa in condemning them as "greedy dogs eating their Lord". He further prescribed that the Eucharistic bread be arranged on the altar in the shape of a cross, with the wine (Blood of Christ) placed to the east of the bread (Body of Christ) and be entirely free of impurities. The deacon was also responsible for the cleanliness of the sanctuary and altar, along with cleaning the vessels afterwards.

=== Biographers ===
The author of his biography, Elias, composed his Life of John of Tella in 542. It consists of a letter addressed to anti-Chalcedonian believers during the severe persecutions brought upon by the Byzantines, urging them to remain faithful despite the hardships. Here, John is presented as a staunch Miaphysite leader and a loyal follower of Severus of Antioch. Though little is known about Elias, it can be gleaned from the letters that he was a disciple of John and an equally ardent Miaphysite. Elias lived with John in the Singara mountains, where he was also abducted by Ephrem and brought to Antioch, where John died the following year. However, these details, coming from Elias himself, are open to debate. Elias's Life, like that of John of Ephesus, portrays John of Tella as the central figure and cornerstone of a clerical hierarchy, along with a network of priests and monks that extended across the boundaries of the Byzantine and Persian empires. Elias also portrays John as a creator of a new Christian politeia and defends him against charges of criminality by the Byzantines and Persians.

John of Ephesus, also called John of Asia, composed another biography of John of Tella; his Life shares similar details with but is an abridged version of Elias's account.

== Works ==
John was a prolific author who maintained regular correspondence with many friends and foes. The following is an incomplete list of his works:

- Canons ad Presbyteros (c. 522/523) — A collection of 27 canons written to village priests, instructing them to remain steadfast in orthodoxy against imperial pressure and provides detailed guidance on the handling and sanctity of the Eucharist
- Quaestiones et Responsiones (512–538) — A question-and-answer treatise consisting of 48 questions addressing topics such as the Eucharist, the role of women in the Church, and relations with heretics; survives in several manuscripts
- Letter against Julianism — A theological letter co-authored at the request of Severus of Antioch condemning Julianism; survives in a small number of manuscripts
- Statement of Faith for the Synod of Constantinople (532/533) — Co-authored by John alongside other anti-Chalcedonian bishops for Justinian's synod in Constantinople; preserved in Pseudo-Zacharias Rhetor's Historia Ecclesiastica
- Libellus Fidei (519) — Addressed to the bishops around Tella, this theological and ecclesiological treatise urges Miaphysite clergy to remain firm against Chalcedonian influence; survives in one manuscript
- Hymnus de Trisagio — A hymn discussing the controversies surrounding the Trisagion and the theopaschite phrase "Who was crucified for us", where John defends the text against Chalcedonian objections and instructs priests on its theological significance; the date of composition is unknown and it survives in two manuscripts
- Canones Monachorum — Written for the monks of Mar Zakkai; only small portions survive across three manuscripts, preserving one of at least forty-eight canons
- Regula ad Diaconos — A set of regulations outlining the duties of deacons in preparation for the Eucharist; surviving manuscript is incomplete, though the missing section is likely of little significance
- Letters to al-Mundhir — A series of now-lost letters exchanged with the Lakhmid king al-Mundhir, written in an effort to convert him to non-Chalcedonian Christianity; though unsuccessful, these exchanges alarmed the Byzantine government, as al-Mundhir was a significant Arab ally of the Sassanids

== Veneration ==
John of Tella is regarded as one of the most influential figures to help preserve the Syriac Orthodox Church during the time of persecution and exile in the early 6th century. He is held responsible for the ordination of thousands of priests and deacons, maintaining the Miaphysite hierarchy despite the imperial opposition. He is memorialized in the Syriac Orthodox church tradition as "one of the greatest militants", a "true confessor of the faith", and a "defender of the orthodox faith".

His persistent efforts to preserve and promote the Oriental Orthodox faith are commemorated annually on his feast day 6 February, according to the Syriac Orthodox Church.

The late patriarch of the Syriac Orthodox Church, Ignatius Aphrem I Barsoum, praised John as "one of the best church dignitaries regarding asceticism and worship".

== See also ==
- Henotikon
- Theodosius of Alexandria
- Peter the Iberian
- Sergius of Tella
- Council of Constantinople (553)
- Monophysitism
- Cyrus of Alexandria

== Bibliography ==
- Barsoum, Ignatius Aphram (2003). The Scattered Pearls: A History of Syriac Literature and Sciences. Translated by Moosa, Matti (Second rev. ed.). Piscataway (N. J.): Gorgias Press, LLC. ISBN 1-931956-04-9.
- Shepardson, Christine (October 1, 2021). "Anxious Vigilance: Heresy and Ritual Pollution in John of Tella and Severus of Antioch". Hugoye: Journal of Syriac Studies. 24 (1): 1–34. doi:10.31826/hug-2021-240102. ISSN 1097-3702.
- Harvey, Susan Ashbrook (1990). Asceticism and Society in Crisis: John of Ephesus and The Lives of the Eastern Saints. Vol. 18 (1 ed.). University of California Press. doi:10.2307/jj.15280399. ISBN 978-0-520-41393-1.
- Menze, Volker L. (2008), "Jacob of Sarug, John of Tella, and Paul of Edessa: Ecclesiastical Politics in Osrhoene 519-522", in Kiraz, George (ed.), Malphono w-Rabo d-Malphone, Gorgias Eastern Christian Studies, Gorgias Press, pp. 421–438, ISBN 978-1-4632-1481-4
- Menze, Volker; Akalin, Kutlu (May 1, 2009). John of Tella's "Profession of Faith": The Legacy of a Sixth-Century Syrian Orthodox Bishop. Gorgias Press, LLC. doi:10.31826/9781463216436. ISBN 978-1-4632-1643-6.
- Menze, Volker (January 1, 2011). "Priests, Laity and the Sacrament of the Eucharist in Sixth Century Syria". Hugoye: Journal of Syriac Studies. 7 (1): 129–146. doi:10.31826/hug-2011-070111. ISSN 1097-3702.
- Menze, Volker L. (2006). "The Regula ad Diaconos: John of Tella, his Eucharistic Ecclesiology and the Establishment of an Ecclesiastical Hierarchy in Exile". Oriens Christianus. 90: 44–90.
- Maas, Michael, ed. (April 18, 2005). The Cambridge Companion to the Age of Justinian (1 ed.). Cambridge University Press. doi:10.1017/ccol0521817463. ISBN 978-0-521-81746-2.
- Rajan, K. Mani (2017). Martyrs, Saints & Prelates of the Syriac Orthodox Church (PDF). Vol. 5. J. S. C. Publications, Patriarchal Centre, Puthencruz.
- Andrade, Nathanael J. (2009). "The Syriac Life of John of Tella and the Frontier Politeia". Hugoye: Journal of Syriac Studies. 12 (2): 199–234. doi:10.31826/hug-2011-120110.
