= John Beynon =

John Beynon may refer to:

- Jackie Beynon (John Alfred Beynon, 1909–1937), Welsh footballer
- Sir John Beynon, 1st Baronet (1864–1944), Welsh industrialist
- A pen name of the British novelist John Wyndham (1903–1969)
- John Beynon (academic) (born 1939), principal of King's College London (1990–1992)
- John H. Beynon (1923–2015), Welsh scientist in the field of mass spectrometry
- John Beynon (poet), British poet who won the Eric Gregory Award
