= Paul II of Antioch =

Paul II of Antioch may refer to:

- Paul the Jew, Chalcedonian patriarch of Antioch from 519 to 521
- Paul the Black, Miaphysite patriarch of Antioch from 564 to 581

== See also ==
- Paul I of Antioch
