= Archibald Robertson (bishop) =

English Anglican bishop and scholar (1853–1931)

The Right Reverend Archibald Robertson
- Bishop of Exeter
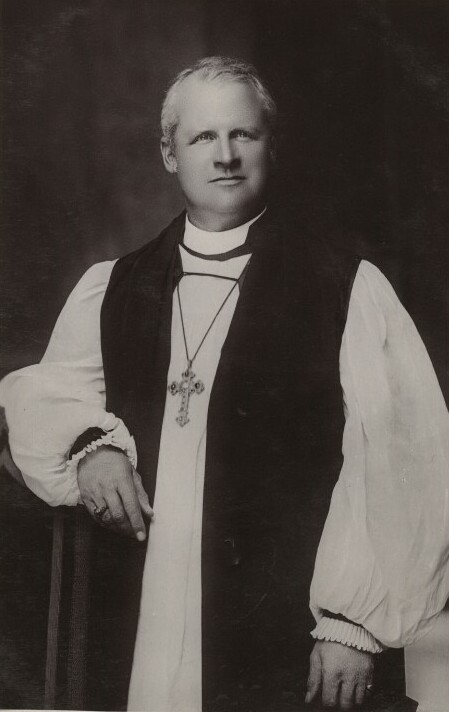
- Diocese: Exeter
- In office: 1903–1916
- Predecessor: Herbert Edward Ryle
- Successor: William Cecil
- Other posts: Principal of King's College London (1897–1903); Vice-Chancellor of the University of London (1902–1903)

Orders
- Ordination: 1878 (deacon); 1882 (priest) by John Mackarness
- Consecration: 1903 by Randall Davidson

Personal details
- Born: 29 June 1853 Sywell, England
- Died: 29 January 1931 (aged 77) Oxford, England
- Denomination: Anglican
- Parents: George Robertson; Helen Kerr
- Spouse: Julia Mann (m. 1885)
- Children: 3 sons, incl. Archibald
- Education: Trinity College, Oxford

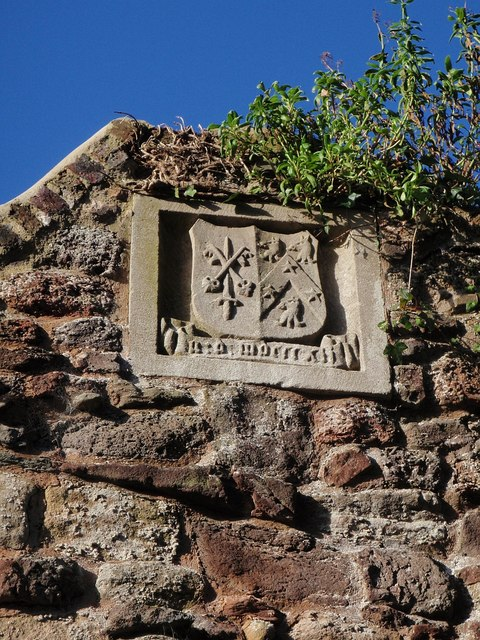
1912 Coat of arms of Bishop Archibald Robertson on Exeter City Wall. Arms: Gules, a sword erect in pale argent hilted or surmounted by two keys addorsed in saltire of the last (See of Exeter) impaling: Gules, on a chevron between three wolf's heads erased argent langued azure three mullets of the field (Robertson)

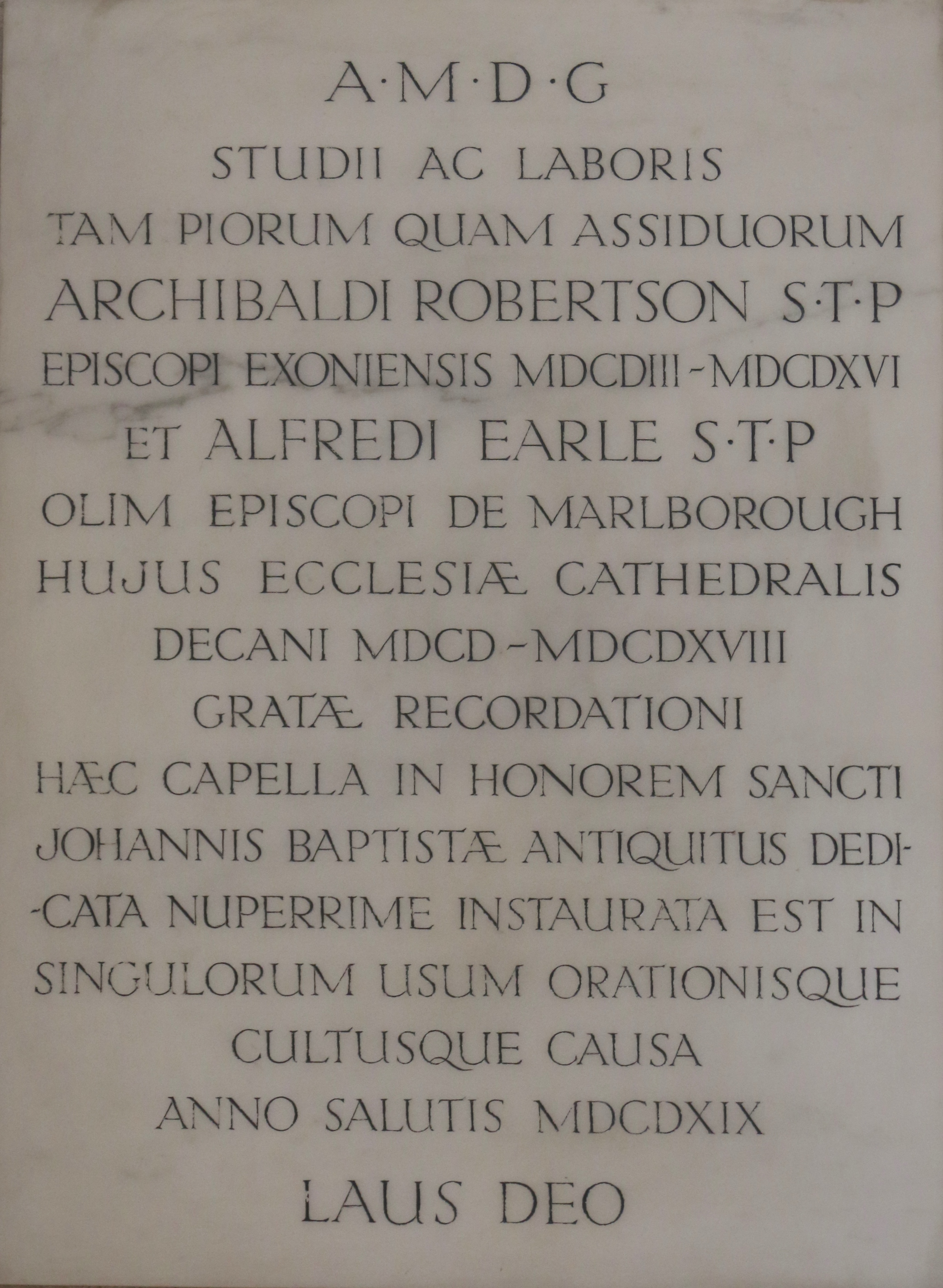
Memorial in Exeter Cathedral

Archibald Robertson (29 June 1853 – 29 January 1931) was the seventh Principal of King's College London who later served as Bishop of Exeter.

== Early life and education ==
He was born at Sywell rectory, Northamptonshire, the eldest son of George Samuel Robertson, curate of Sywell, (1825–1874) and his wife, Helen née Kerr, and grandson of Archibald Robertson and William Charles Kerr junior, both physicians of Northampton. He was educated at Bradfield College and Trinity College, Oxford, where he graduated in 1876 with a first class degree in Classics (Lit. Hum.). He became a Fellow of Trinity in 1876 (until 1886), Dean of the same (1879–1883), and a Doctor of Divinity (DD). He was ordained (both times by John Mackarness, Bishop of Oxford): a deacon on Trinity Sunday (16 June) 1878 in Cuddesdon Parish Church; and a priest on St Thomas's day (21 December) 1882 in Christ Church.

== Career ==
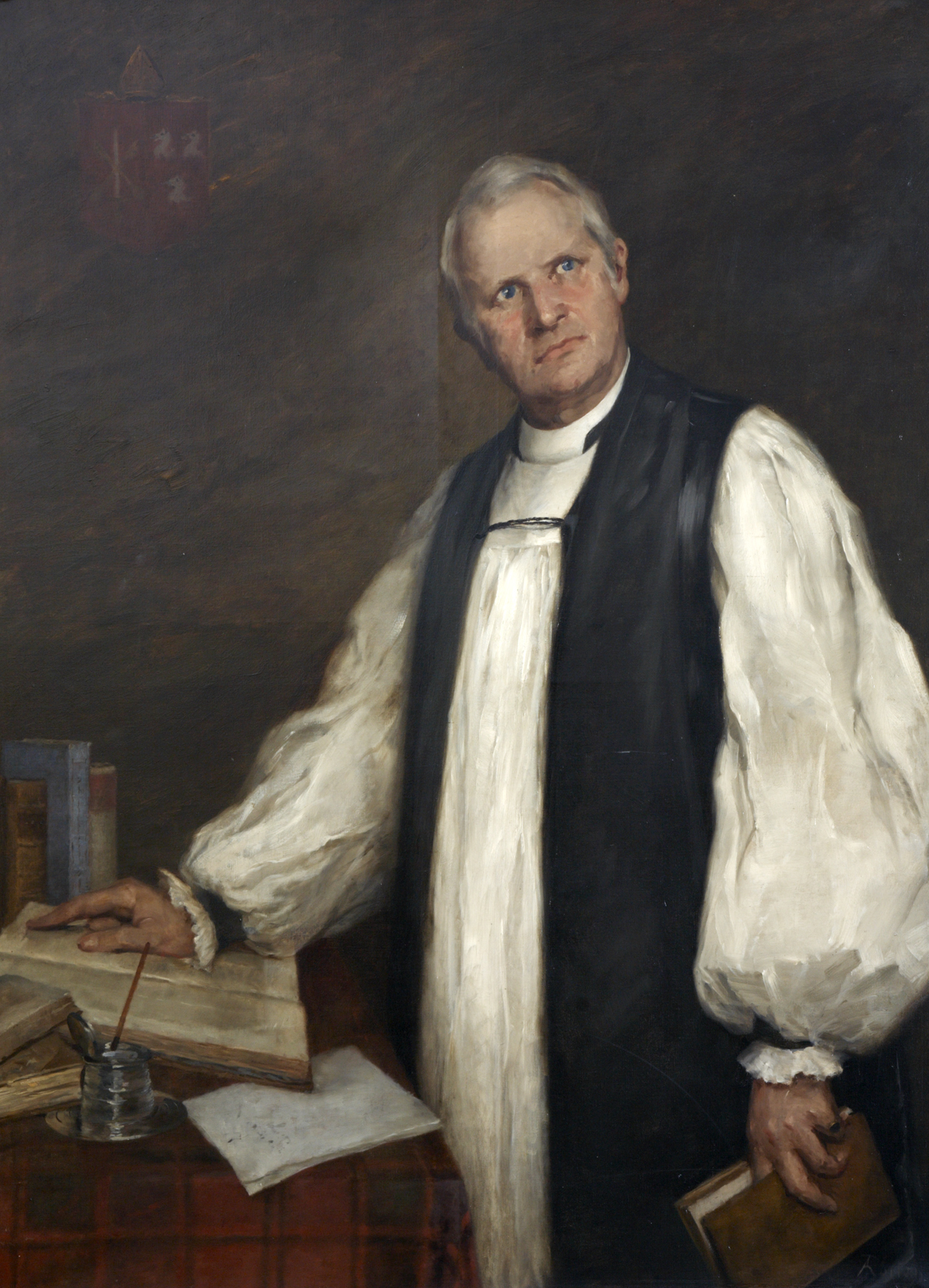
Portrait of Robertson as Bishop of Exeter

From 1883 to 1897 he was Principal of Bishop Hatfield's Hall in Durham. He went on to serve as Principal of King's College London from 1897 to 1903, during which he was elected to serve as Vice-Chancellor of the University of London for the year 1902–1903. He also served as an examining chaplain for Forrest Browne, Bishop of Bristol, in 1897, and became a Fellow of King's College in 1899. He received an honorary doctorate (Doctor of Divinity, DD) from Durham University in 1893 and a further one (Legum Doctor, LLD) from the University of Glasgow in June 1901. He was Boyle Lecturer in 1900 and Bampton Lecturer in 1901, became an honorary fellow of Trinity in 1903 and was a Vice-President of the Clan-Donnachaid Society. He was also briefly Governor of Rugby School in 1903.

In his academic career, Robertson was a specialist in patristics and church history, in which field he was widely published and respected. He was elected Bishop of Exeter on Easter Monday (13 April) 1903, consecrated (ordained) as a bishop on 1 May (by Randall Davidson, Archbishop of Canterbury, at St Paul's Cathedral) and enthroned and installed at Exeter Cathedral on 5 May; he legally took up the See upon the confirmation of his election, which took place between his election and consecration (i.e. during April 1903). In 1912 Lollards Tower on the Exeter City Wall was rebuilt and several sculpted stone tablets displaying the arms of Bishop Robertson were set into the walls, including one over the arched entrance known as Bishop Carey's Postern. He served as diocesan bishop until 1916, when he resigned due to ill health, retiring to Oxford, where he died at home in 1931.

Robertson was strongly in favour of Great Britain's declaration of War against Germany in August, 1914. He believed that Germany's ultimate aim was to destroy Great Britain. "Whether it pleases God to give us victory or not, we believe we are fighting for the fraternity and equal right of nations, against the claim that might is right! We are, furthermore, fighting in self-defence." Although frequently absent from his post because of ill-health, Robertson prepared a Briefing Note for clergy to teach parishioners about the reasons justifying the War, encouraged prayers for animals such as horses used by cavalry and artillery and praised clergy whose families were active participants. An especial mention was made of the Rector of Dartington, 5 of whose 7 sons were in the army, the sixth had been in the Royal Navy and the youngest was still at school but in the Officers Training Corps.

== Family ==
Robertson married in 1885, shortly after his arrival in Durham. His wife was Julia Mann, daughter of Charles, Rector of Mawgan-in-Meneage and St Issey, Cornwall. They had three sons. The eldest of these, of the same name, was the communist and atheist Archibald Robertson (atheist) (1886–1961).

== Works ==
- Robertson, Archibald, ed. (1882). St Athanasius on the Incarnation: Edited for the Use of Students with a Brief Introduction And Notes (first ed.). London: David Nutt.
- Robertson, Archibald, ed. (1891). St Athanasius on the Incarnation (second ed.). London: David Nutt.
- Robertson, Archibald, ed. (1892). A Select Library of the Nicene and Post-Nicene Fathers of the Christian Church, Second Series, Volume IV: St. Athanasius Select Work and Letters.
- Robertson, Archibald (1896). Roman Claims to Supremacy. London: S.P.C.K.
- Robertson, Archibald (1901). Regnum Dei: Eight Lectures on the Kingdom of God in the History of Christian Thought. Bampton Lectures. London: Methuen.
- Robertson, Archibald; Plummer, Alfred (1911). A Critical and Exegetical Commentary on the First Epistle of St. Paul to the Corinthians (first ed.). Edinburgh: T. & T. Clark\.
- Robertson, Archibald; Plummer, Alfred (1914). A Critical and Exegetical Commentary on the First Epistle of St. Paul to the Corinthians (second ed.). Edinburgh: T. & T. Clark\.

Academic offices
Preceded by Henry Wace	Principal of King's College London; 1897–1903	Succeeded by Arthur Headlam
Preceded by Henry Roscoe	Vice-Chancellor of University of London; 1902–1903	Succeeded by Philip Pye-Smith
Church of England titles
Preceded by Herbert Edward Ryle	Bishop of Exeter; 1903–1916	Succeeded by William Cecil
