= Richard Larkins =

Australian academic administrator

Richard Larkins AC

Chancellor of La Trobe University
- In office 26 February 2017 – 29 March 2019
- Preceded by: Adrienne Clarke
- Succeeded by: John Brumby

7th Vice-Chancellor and President of Monash University
- In office 1 September 2003 – 30 June 2009
- Preceded by: Peter Darvall AO
- Succeeded by: Edward Byrne AO

Personal details
- Born: 17 May 1943 (age 83) Melbourne, Australia
- Spouse: Caroline Larkins
- Education: University of Melbourne; University of London
- Profession: Professor

Richard Graeme Larkins AC (born 17 May 1943) is the former Chancellor of La Trobe University. He was the Vice-Chancellor and President of Monash University from 2003 to June 2009. Prior to this, he had a distinguished career in medicine, scientific research and academic management.

== Early life ==
Larkins is the son of Graeme Larkins and Margaret "Peg" Rosanove. His father was a medical doctor who specialised in geriatric medicine. His mother was a lawyer and Victoria's first female judge on the Family Court of Australia. Larkins attended Melbourne Grammar School, where he was dux. He then entered Trinity College while studying medicine at the University of Melbourne, where he graduated as the top student and won 13 of the 15 graduation prizes.

== Career ==
Larkins' medical research and clinical work was in diabetes and endocrinology. He was the James Stewart Chair of Medicine at the Royal Melbourne Hospital from 1984 to 1997. He was then Dean of the Faculty of Medicine, Dentistry and Health Sciences at the University of Melbourne from 1998 to 2003. He was then appointed Vice-Chancellor of Monash University, where he remained until 2009.

In recognition of his contribution to medicine, Larkins received the Eric Susman Prize for medical research in 1982 and the Sir William Upjohn Medal and a Centenary of Federation Medal in 2002. In 2002, he was also made an Officer of the Order of Australia (AO). During his career, he has also served as a member of the Prime Minister's Science, Engineering and Innovation Council from 1977 to 2000, chair of the National Health and Medical Research Council of Australia from 1997 to 2000 and President of the Royal Australasian College of Physicians from 2000 to 2002. In 2007, he was appointed as Chair of Universities Australia, a position he held until May 2009.

Larkins was elected Fellow of the Australian Academy of Health and Medical Sciences (FAHMS) in 2015.

Larkins currently serves as President of the Australian University Sport and President of the National Stroke Foundation. He has also served as Chairman of Governors at Melbourne Grammar School.

Larkins was made a Companion of the Order of Australia on 26 January 2019.

== Views on higher education ==
While Larkins supported certain measures introduced by John Howard's government, he was largely critical of its over-regulation of the university sector and its failure to index university funding to inflation. In a speech to the Melbourne Press Club in February 2008, Larkins lamented the 30% drop in public university funding from 1996 to 2004, stressing the central role that universities must play if Australia's economy is to remain competitive in the future. As the head of Universities Australia, he has emphasised the need for greater public investment in university teaching and research. Additionally, Larkins has argued that a national internships program should be established to create closer links between universities and industry. More controversially, Larkins has expressed his personal view that the student contribution to HECS payments should be deregulated, noting that all evidence suggests that HECS repayment amounts do not act as a disincentive for students to study and that only this will enable Australia's top universities to continue to compete globally.

Academic offices
Preceded by Peter Darvall	Vice-Chancellor of Monash University; 2003–2009	Succeeded by Edward Byrne
Preceded by Adrienne Clarke	Chancellor of La Trobe University; 2017-2019	Succeeded by John Brumby
