= John of Ephesus =

6th-century Byzantine historian

John of Ephesus (or of Asia) (Greek: Ίωάννης ὁ Έφέσιος, Classical Syriac: ܝܘܚܢܢ ܕܐܦܣܘܣ, c. 507 – c. 588 AD) was a leader of the early Syriac Orthodox Church in the sixth century and one of the earliest and the most important historians to write in Syriac. John was a bishop, historian, and writer. He provides one of the only first-hand accounts of the Plague of Justinian. He was also alive in what has been called the worst year in history, 536.

== Life ==
Born at the city of Amida (modern Diyarbakır in southeastern Turkey) about 507, he was there ordained as a deacon in 529 by John of Tella at Zuqnin Monastery, When John was a teenager, he moved to Amida, located on the Tigris River. Amida was in the province of Armenia IV. Ever since John was a small child, he lived in the monastery of Maro, the Stylite. After his death, John lived the monastic lifestyle. In 534, he left Armenia IV for Palestine because of imperial opposition to his miaphysitism. In 535 he passed to Constantinople. He returned to the east in later years of the 530s, where he witnessed the devastations of the great plague firsthand. He traveled the region, going so far as Egypt, in order to collect stories for his collection of saints' lives, which he compiled in a book (containing 58 such lives) around the year 565. He was back in Amida at the start of the furious persecution directed against the Monophysites by Ephrem, Melkite Patriarch of Antioch, and Abraham, bishop of Amida c. 520–541. Around 540 he returned to Constantinople and made it his residence.

In Constantinople he seems to have early won the notice of Justinian I, one of the main objects of whose policy was the consolidation of Eastern Christianity as a bulwark against the Zoroastrian power of Persia, through persecution of all the remaining pagans of the empire. John is said by Barhebraeus (Chron. eccl. i. 195) to have succeeded Anthimus as Miaphysite bishop of Constantinople, but this is probably a mistake. In any case, he enjoyed the emperor's favor until the death of the latter in 565 and (as he himself tells us) was entrusted with the administration of the entire revenues of the Miaphysite Church.

He was sent by Justinian on a mission for the conversion of such pagans as remained in Asia Minor in 542, and informs us that the number of those whom he baptized amounted to 70,000. It was thought that John was trying to convert these people to Miaphysitism. He also built a large monastery at Tralles on the hills skirting the valley of the Meander, and more than one hundred other monasteries and churches, mostly on top of demolished pagan temples. Of the mission to the Nubians which he may have promoted, though he did not himself visit their country, an interesting account is given in the 4th book of the 3rd part of his History. He was ordained bishop of Ephesus (Asia) for the anti-Chalcedonians in 558 by Jacob Baradaeus, although his title was largely nominal and he remained in Constantinople.

In 546, he collaborated with the emperor during a persecution targeting pagans in Constantinople and its neighborhood. He carried out this task faithfully, torturing all suspected of the "wicked heathenish error", as John himself calls it, and finding much worship of the ancestral gods amongst the Empire's aristocracy. But his fortunes changed soon after the accession of Justin II. About 571 John III the Scholasticus, the orthodox or Chalcedonian patriarch, began (with the sanction of the emperor) a rigorous persecution of the Miaphysite Church leaders, and John was among those who suffered most. John was imprisoned at Chalcedon. He gives us a detailed account of his sufferings in prison, confiscation of his property, etc., in the third part of his History. The latest events recorded are of the date 588, and the author cannot have lived much longer; but of the circumstances of his death nothing is known.

== Writings ==
John's main work was his Ecclesiastical History, which covered more than six centuries, from the time of Julius Caesar to 588, although John himself employs the Seleucid era. It was composed in three parts, each containing six books. The first part seems to have wholly perished. The second, which extended from Theodosius II to the 6th or 7th year of Justin II, was, according to F. Nau, reproduced in full or almost in full in John's own words in the third part of the Zuqnin Chronicle, which was until recently mistakenly attributed to the patriarch Dionysius Telmaharensis. Modern research has shown that it is more likely that large parts are missing. Of this second division of John's History, in which he may have incorporated the so-called Chronicle of Joshua the Stylite, considerable portions are found in the British Library manuscripts Add. 14647 and 14650, and these have been published in the second volume of J. P. N. Land's Anecdota Syriaca. But the whole is more completely presented in the Vatican manuscript (Codex Zuquenensis, shelfmark Vatican Syriac 162), which incorporates much of John's chronicle in a kolophon dated to the eighth century. (English translation, with notes, by Amir Harrak, The Chronicle of Zuqnin, Parts III and IV (Toronto, 1999) and by Witold Witakowski, Pseudo-Dionysius of Tel-Mahre: Chronicle, Part III (Liverpool, 1997)).

The third part of John's history, which is a detailed account of the ecclesiastical events which happened in 571-588, as well as of some earlier occurrences, survives in a fairly complete state in Add. 14640, a British Museum manuscript of the seventh century. It forms a contemporary record of great value to the historian. Its somewhat disordered state, the want of chronological arrangement, and the occasional repetition of accounts of the same events are due, as the author himself informs us (ii. 50), to the work being almost entirely composed during the times of his imprisonment in Constantinople. The same cause may account for the somewhat slovenly Syriac style. The writer claims to have treated his subject impartially, and though written from the narrow point of view of one to whom Miaphysite Orthodoxy was all-important, it is largely a faithful reproduction of events as they occurred. This third part was edited by William Cureton (Oxford, 1853) and E.W. Brooks (CSCO 105, Louvain, 1935), and was translated - sometimes paraphrase - into English by Robert Payne Smith (Oxford, 1860), into German by J. M. Schonfelder (Munich, 1862) and into Latin by Brooks (CSCO 106, Louvain, 1936).

John's other known work was a series of Biographies of Eastern Saints, compiled about 565-7. The purpose of John's writing "Lives of eastern saints" was to show and talk about the lives of holy men and women of the Miaphysite faith. These stories about these people giving glory to god, and it was supposed to help bolster the faith of people that were persecuted and scattered throughout the Eastern Empire. These have been edited by Land in Anecdota Syriaca, ii. 1-288, and translated into Latin by van Douwen and Land (Amsterdam, 1889), and into English by Brooks (Patrologia Orientalis vols 17-19, 1923–26). An estimate of John as an ecclesiastic and author was given by the Louis Duchesne in a memoir read before the five French Academies on October 25, 1892.

Christ appears quite frequently in John's life and in the writings that he produces. John wrote the Lives of John of Tella and John of Hephaestopolis. In those writings, John talks about how he sees Christ as an example of humility. He believes that monks should follow this way of thinking. An example of this can be found in chapter 14, where John is told, 'He has … in his own person shown you humility', and humility is a universally important monastic virtue. Another example of Christ's teachings about humility also appears in another text, Life of Simeon. Where it talks about how whenever Simeon would get a visitor, he would wash their feet. It did not matter how many there were. The example that it is talking about is foot washing and how a holy man will do it no matter how insignificant the task might be. John talks about how he interprets Christ's teachings. He seeks to live to the fullest extent of Christ's teachings. He seeks like Christ did to serve others, be humble and wash the feet of others.[1]

== Climatic observations ==
Writings by John of Ephesus describe the sun's light as going dim during the years 535 and 536 AD, which was subsequently followed by a cooling that lasted for just over a decade:

There was a sign from the sun the like of which had never been seen or reported before. The sun became dark and its darkness lasted for eighteen months. Each day it shone for about four hours and still, this light was but a feeble shadow. Everyone declared that the sun would never recover its full light again.

Previously, these were explained as religiously symbolic or a local occurrence. These were shown to be, in 2010, an actual report of two distant volcanic eruptions which resulted in a dimming of the sun for close to two years and created an artificial winter in the Northern Hemisphere that lasted for just over a decade. This is now known as LALIA, or the Late Antique Little Ice Age. A search for writings mentioning these dark years was undertaken when dendrochronologists around the world began to realize that the rings of ancient trees indicated that there was a miniature Ice Age lasting about two years that began at around this time. The hypothesis at that time was that it was possibly the result of a supervolcano that erupted in South America. A subsequent search puts forward that it may have been two different volcanoes that were some distance away from each other.
