= Hendrickson Publishers =

American reference book house

- Founded: 1980
- Country of origin: United States
- Headquarters location: Peabody, Massachusetts
- Nonfiction topics: Biblical Languages, Biblical Studies

Hendrickson Publishers is an American academic and reference publishing house founded in 1980. It is based in Peabody, Massachusetts.

== History ==
The company was established on 12 May 1980 and incorporated in Massachusetts. Hendrickson acquired Rose Publishing in 2017. In 2021, Tyndale House Publishers acquired Hendrickson Publishers.

== Notable publications ==
- Dictionary of Christian Biography and Literature to the End of the Sixth Century, 1999, by William C. Piercy and Henry Wace, Dean of Canterbury.
- Introduction to the New Testament in the Original Greek, 1988.
- Thayer's Greek-English Lexicon of the New Testament, 2003, by Joseph Henry Thayer.
