= Peter Darvall =

Australian academic

Peter Darvall AO FTSE

6th Vice-Chancellor and President of Monash University
- In office 2002 – 30 August 2003
- Preceded by: David Robinson
- Succeeded by: Richard Larkins AO

Personal details
- Education: University of Melbourne; Ohio State University; Princeton University
- Profession: Professor
- Website: From the Vice-Chancellor

Peter Darvall AO FTSE was the Vice-Chancellor and President of Monash University from 2002 until August 2003. Prior to this, he had a distinguished career in civil engineering and was at Monash for 33 years. He was educated at Scotch College Melbourne.

Prior to being vice chancellor he was the Deputy Vice-Chancellor at Monash University, responsible for research and development and information technology, a position he held from 1993 to 2003, and was previously Dean of the Faculty of Engineering. Professor Darvall is the author of several books on mechanics and structures and has written numerous research papers on topics related to his areas of expertise. He has been a board member of the Prince Henry's Institute for Medical Research, Montech, the Victorian Strategic Industry Foundation (SIRF), the Baker Medical Research Institute, the Institute of Reproduction and Development and (CRCs) and the Cooperative Research Centres for Catchment Hydrology, Water Quality and Treatment, and Freshwater Ecology. He was also previously on the board of Melbourne Water.

Academic offices
| Preceded by David Robinson | Vice-Chancellor of Monash University; 2002–2003 | Succeeded by Richard Larkins |
