= Archibald Robertson (physician) =

Scottish physician and medical author

- Born: 3 December 1789; Cockburnspath, Scotland
- Died: 19 October 1864 (aged 74); Clifton, Bristol, England
- Military career
- Allegiance: United Kingdom
- Branch: Royal Navy
- Service years: 1808–1815
- Rank: Ship's Surgeon
- Conflicts: Napoleonic Wars; War of 1812
- Other work: Physician and writer

Archibald Robertson FRS FRSE (3 December 1789 in Cockburnspath, near Dunbar – 19 October 1864 in Clifton, Bristol) was a Scottish physician and medical author who had a notable naval career, followed by a long private practice.

== Biography ==
In 1808 Robertson became assistant surgeon at Mill Prison hospital for French prisoners at Plymouth. In 1809 he was in Lord Gambier's flagship Caledonia in Basque roads, when Lord Dundonald tried to burn the French fleet. He then served in the Baltic, and afterwards in the West Indies, in the Persian and the Cydnus, besides boat service in the attempt on New Orleans. At the peace of 1815 with the United States he went on half-pay, having received a medal with two clasps.

In 1818 he settled in Northampton, where he obtained a lucrative practice. In 1820 he was elected physician to the Northampton infirmary. In 1853 he retired to Clifton. On 11 February 1836 he was elected a fellow of the Royal Society, and in the same year became a member of the Royal Society of Edinburgh. In 1844 he served as president of the British Medical Association.

== Education ==
Robertson studied at Duns school, and thereafter with Mr. Strachan in Berwickshire. He studied medicine at Edinburgh University, graduating MB ChB in 1808 and a doctorate (MD) from Edinburgh in 1817. He wrote his thesis on the dysentery of hot climates.

== Family ==
He was married to Lucy. Their children included the Rev. George Samuel Robertson (1825–1874), M.A. of Exeter College, Oxford, the father of Archibald Robertson (1853–1931), bishop of Exeter.

== Publications ==
Robertson wrote:

- De Dysenteria regionum calidarum (1817)
- Medical Topography of New Orleans, with an Account of the Principal Diseases that affected the Fleet and Army of the late unsuccessful Expedition against that City (1818)
- Conversations on anatomy, physiology, and surgery (1827); then 1832.
- A Lecture on Civilisation (1839)

He also contributed to John Forbes's Cyclopædia of Practical Medicine, 1833–5, 4 vols.
