= Rick Trainor =

British historian

Sir Richard Trainor KBE FRHistS FKC FAcSS
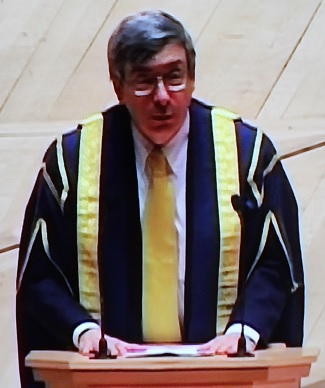
- Trainor in January 2009

Warden of Rhodes House and Chief Executive Officer of the Rhodes Trust
- Interim; 2025 – 1 July 2026
- Preceded by: Elizabeth Kiss
- Succeeded by: Chrystia Freeland

Personal details
- Born: 31 December 1948 (age 77) United States of America
- Spouse: Marguerite Dupree
- Children: 2
- Education: Brown University; Princeton University; Merton College, Oxford; Nuffield College, Oxford
- Profession: Historian and academic administrator

Sir Richard Hughes Trainor, KBE, FRHistS, FKC, FAcSS (born 31 December 1948), is an academic administrator and historian. He served as vice-chancellor of the University of Greenwich from 2000 to 2004, as principal and latterly president of King's College London from 2004 to 2014, and as rector of Exeter College at the University of Oxford between 2014 and 2024. From 2025 to 2026, he served as interim warden of Rhodes House and CEO of the Rhodes Trust.

Trainor was born in the United States. He was awarded an honorary knighthood (KBE) in June 2010 for services to higher education in the United Kingdom. The award was honorary because of his American nationality, but on 31 December 2010, the knighthood was made substantive by Queen Elizabeth II following his assumption of dual citizenship (American and British).

== Life and education ==
Trainor was educated at Calvert Hall College High School in Towson, Maryland, in the United States. He graduated from Brown University with a BA in American Civilization, summa cum laude. He subsequently earned MA degrees from Princeton University and from Merton College, Oxford, before completing his D.Phil. in 1981 at Nuffield College, Oxford, entitled "Authority and social structure in an industrialized area: A study of three Black Country towns, 1840–1890". He is a former Rhodes Scholar.

He is married to Marguerite Dupree, an academic historian of medicine who is honorary professor of Social and Medical History at Glasgow University. They have two children.

== Career ==
Trainor was vice-chancellor of the University of Greenwich and Professor of Social History from 2000 to 2004. Prior to this appointment, between 1979 and 2000, he was an academic (latterly Professor of Social History) and administrator (successively director of the Design and Implementation of Software in History [DISH] Project, Dean of Social Sciences and Vice-Principal) of the University of Glasgow. In 2004, Trainor became principal of King's College London, where he was also Professor of Social History. In 2009 the title of President of King's was added.

Between 2007 and 2009, Trainor served as president of Universities UK (UUK), the organisation that represents the heads of all British universities. As part of his work with UUK Trainor co-chaired the Prime Minister's UK/US Higher Education Study Group, which resulted in a major initiative, the UK-US Higher Education Global Innovation Fund.

After becoming principal of King's in 2004, Trainor oversaw the promotion of the college from 96th to 19th place in the QS World University Rankings (2015/16), making it the 5th ranked UK university. In 2010 King's was named UK Sunday Times University of the Year. According to 2014's Research Excellence Framework (REF), the academic institution rose 15 places since its last assessment in 2008, climbing on grade point average to reach seventh place. He also oversaw King's College London joining the Francis Crick Institute in 2011. During his tenure, in 2009, King's acquired the east wing of Somerset House, after 180 years of intermittent negotiations between King's and the Somerset House authorities. Somerset House East Wing was opened by Queen Elizabeth II in February 2012.

In June 2013, Exeter College, Oxford announced that Trainor was the preferred candidate to succeed Frances Cairncross as rector. The college announced his formal pre-election in October 2013, and Trainor took office on 1 October 2014. Trainor oversaw the adoption in 2019 of a new strategic plan, under which the College has diversified its undergraduate admissions profile, adopted new Statutes, and launched ambitious sustainability initiatives. Between 2016 and 2024, he was also a Pro-Vice-Chancellor without portfolio of Oxford University, chairing professorial appointment panels and presiding at ceremonies when the Vice-Chancellor was not available.

After Elizabeth Kiss announced in September 2024 that she would step down as warden of Rhodes House at the end of the year, it was confirmed in November 2024 that Trainor would assume the role of interim warden beginning in January 2025.

Trainor was also governor of the Royal Academy of Music between 2013 and 2022, and the London Museum from 2014 to 2021. Since 2022, he has also been a non-executive director of the Oxford Health NHS Foundation Trust.

== Honors ==
He is a Fellow of the Academy of Social Sciences (FAcSS) and a Fellow of the Royal Historical Society (FRHistS). He is also an honorary fellow of Exeter College, Oxford, Merton College, Oxford, Trinity College of Music, the Royal Academy of Music and the Institute of Historical Research and is a patron of the Anglo-American Fulbright Commission.

He holds honorary degrees from the University of Kent (since 2009); the Rosalind Franklin University of Medicine and Science (since 2012); the University of Glasgow (since 2014); the University of Greenwich (since 2022); and Williams College (Since 2024).

He has been Emeritus professor of Social History at King's College London since 2014, and was a member of the Joint Information Systems Committee 2001-2005, the council of the Arts and Humanities Research Council 2006-2011 and of the UK/US Fulbright Commission 2003-2009. Trainor was President of the Economic History Society 2013-2016, and he chaired the Advisory Committee of the Institute of Historical Research 2004-2009.

As a result of his work at King's College London, the institution established the Professor Sir Richard Trainor Postgraduate Research Scholarship in his name in 2014.

== Published works ==
- Black Country élites: the exercise of authority in an industrialised area, 1830–1900. Oxford: Clarendon Press, 1993.
- Urban governance: Britain and beyond since 1750, edited by Robert J. Morris and Richard H. Trainor. Aldershot: Ashgate, 2000.
- University, city and state: the University of Glasgow since 1870, by Michael Moss, J. Forbes Munro and Richard H. Trainor. Edinburgh: Edinburgh University Press for the University of Glasgow, 2000.
- Reform and its Complexities in Modern Britain: Essays Inspired by Sir Brian Harrison, edited by Bruce Kinzer, Molly Baer Kramer and Richard Trainor. Oxford: Oxford University Press, 2022.

Academic offices
Preceded by Arthur Lucas	Principal of King's College London; 2004 to 2014	Succeeded by Ed Byrne
Preceded by Frances Cairncross	Rector of Exeter College, Oxford; 2014 to 2024	Succeeded by Andrew Roe
