= Arthur Lucas (educationist) =

Australian academic (born 1941)

Arthur Maurice Lucas CBE FRSB (born 26 October 1941) is an Australian academic who served as the 18th Principal of King's College London.

He was educated at the University of Melbourne where he took BSc and BEd degrees, and subsequently earned his PhD from Ohio State University. He began his academic career at Flinders University where he was a senior demonstrator in biology, prior to a posting as a research associate at Ohio State University. Lucas then returned to Flinders University where he became a senior lecturer, before moving to King's College London where he became professor of science curriculum studies. At King's he served as Assistant Principal from 1988–90, Vice-Principal (academic affairs) 1991-93, and Acting Principal from 1992–93, before becoming the College's 18th Principal in 1993. During his tenure as Principal he also served as deputy Vice-Chancellor of the University of London. He was made a fellow of King's in 1992, and remained as Principal of the College until 2003, succeeded by Acting Principal Barry Ife, and then Professor Rick Trainor.

During his tenure at King's College London, Lucas oversaw a number of mergers and the acquisition of the former Public Record Office in Chancery Lane, now the Maughan Library.

In 2006 Professor Lucas was elected President of the Society for the History of Natural History.

He is a member of the Athenaeum Club.

Academic offices
Preceded by John Beynon	Principal of King's College London; 1993–2003	Succeeded by Rick Trainor
