= Stewart Sutherland, Baron Sutherland of Houndwood =

Scottish academic and public servant (1941-2018)

The Right Honourable The Lord Sutherland of Houndwood KT FRSE FBA FKC
- In the House of Lords chamber, 2016

President of the Royal Society of Edinburgh
- In office 2002–2005
- Preceded by: Sir William Stewart
- Succeeded by: Sir Michael Atiyah

Member of the House of Lords
- Lord Temporal
- Life peerage 29 June 2001 – 29 January 2018

Personal details
- Born: 25 February 1941
- Died: 29 January 2018 (aged 76)
- Education: University of Aberdeen; Corpus Christi College, Cambridge

Stewart Ross Sutherland, Baron Sutherland of Houndwood (25 February 1941 – 29 January 2018) was a Scottish academic, public servant, and one of Britain's most distinguished philosophers of religion. He sat as a crossbencher in the House of Lords.

== Education ==
He was educated at Robert Gordon's College. In 1963 he graduated from the University of Aberdeen with a first-class Master of Arts degree in Philosophy, and received a Bachelor of Arts degree in the Philosophy of Religion from Corpus Christi College, Cambridge, in 1965.

== Career ==
He was then appointed assistant lecturer in philosophy at the University College of North Wales, and three years later returned to Scotland as a lecturer at the University of Stirling. In Stirling, he established the Religious Studies department and recruited John Drane and the late Glyn Richards to work alongside him in this enterprise. Then in 1977 he became Professor of the History and Philosophy of Religion at King's College London, and was subsequently appointed Vice-Principal and Principal there in 1981 and 1985 respectively.

In 1990, Sutherland became Vice-chancellor of the University of London, and was appointed chief inspector of schools two years later. He succeeded this post as Principal and Vice-chancellor of the University of Edinburgh, in which position he served until 2002. During his Principalship the university made significant advances in teaching and research, effectively implementing organisational change. He was the provost of Gresham College between 2002 and 2008. In 1992, he was elected to the British Academy, and in 1995 he became a Fellow of the Royal Society of Edinburgh, the same year he was knighted and became president in 2002. He served on the Higher Education Funding Council for England, and the equivalent body in Hong Kong.

Following his involvement in the establishment of the Age Concern Institute of Gerontology at King's College London, he was invited by the incoming Blair government in 1997 to chair a Royal Commission on Long-Term Care of Older People. This recommended that government (including the NHS and local authorities) should be responsible for providing free care in the spirit of the NHS Act to all people even if their illness takes the form of a chronic mental frailty. His recommendations were taken up by the devolved Scottish government, though were never implemented for England and Wales.

== Philosophy ==
As a philosopher of religion, Sutherland had focused on how people continue to be morally responsible human beings in pluralist societies without the metaphysical security of traditional and potentially divisive systems of belief. Influenced by his intellectual mentor, Donald M. MacKinnon, Sutherland's approach has brought the clarity and rigour of the Anglo-American tradition of analytic philosophy into conversation with literary and philosophical thinkers on the European continent.

In Atheism and the Rejection of God: Contemporary Philosophy and "The Brothers Karamazov" (1977) and Faith and Ambiguity (1984), he explored continental thinkers including Dostoevsky, Kierkegaard, Camus and Weil. His Wilde Lectures at the University of Oxford – published as God, Jesus and Belief: The Legacy of Theism (1984) – explored a range of intellectual, moral and existential issues in contemporary philosophical theology, developing further his argument that Christian ethical and faith traditions continue to have an enduring value at a time when former patterns of belief have broken down. He further promoted his field of study in two influential edited volumes, The Philosophical Frontiers of Christian Theology: Essays Presented to D. M. MacKinnon (with Brian Hebblethwaite), (1982) and Religion, Reason and the Self (with T A Roberts), (1989).

In two other edited volumes, World Religions (1988), and The Study of Religion: Traditional and New Religions (with Peter Clarke), (1991), he had contributed to the increasingly significant field of religious studies in school and university curricula, while also promoting understanding and mutual respect amongst peoples of different faiths.

== Achievements and honours ==
Coat of arms of Stewart Sutherland, Baron Sutherland of Houndwood
Crest The figure of Clio seated upon a stool and holding in her dexter hand a book Proper. Escutcheon Gules three mullets Or on a chief also Or between dexter an oak tree and sinister a conifer both couped Proper an open book also Proper binding and fore-edges Gules. Supporters Dexter a male figure in the attire of the Vice-Chancellor of Edinburgh University sinister a male figure in the attire of an honorary graduate of Abrdeen University and wearing the hat appropriate to an honorary doctor of the University of Uppsala. Motto "Know Yourself"

Sutherland was made a Knight Bachelor in 1995.

On 29 June 2001, he was created a life peer as Baron Sutherland of Houndwood, of Houndwood in the Scottish Borders, and was the following year elected to the presidency of the Royal Society of Edinburgh. In the introduction to the House of Lords ceremony, his Senior Supporter was The Lord Flowers and his Junior Supporter was The Lord Wilson of Tillyorn.

He was made a Knight of the Thistle in 2002, was the recipient of a number of honorary degrees, and continued to serve with various institutions. In 2004 he became a Fellow of Birkbeck, University of London. On 31 May 1996 he received an honorary doctorate from the Faculty of Theology at Uppsala University, Sweden.

In 2005, he became a member of the editorial board of the Encyclopædia Britannica.

== Artistic recognition ==
A bronze bust of Lord Sutherland of Houndwood, by Vincent Butler, stands at the head of the stair to the Playfair Library in Old College, University of Edinburgh.

== See also ==
- List of Vice-Chancellors of the University of London
- List of Principals of University of Edinburgh

== Notes and references ==
Academic offices
Preceded by The Lord Cameron of Balhousie	Principal of King's College London; 1985–1990	Succeeded by John Beynon
Preceded by The Lord Flowers	Vice-Chancellor of the University of London; 1990–1994	Succeeded by Andrew Rutherford
Preceded by Sir David Smith	Principal of the University of Edinburgh; 1994–2002	Succeeded by Timothy O'Shea
Preceded by Sir William Stewart	President of the Royal Society of Edinburgh; 2002–2005	Succeeded by Sir Michael Atiyah
