= Euphrasius of Antioch =

Patriarch of Antioch from 521 to 526

- Patriarch of Antioch and All the East
- Church: Chalcedonian Christianity
- See: Antioch
- Installed: 521
- Term ended: May 526
- Predecessor: Paul the Jew
- Successor: Ephraim of Antioch

Personal details
- Died: May 526 Antioch

Euphrasius of Antioch was the Greek Orthodox Patriarch of Antioch from 521 to 526. He was elected after Paul the Jew abdicated and was milder than his predecessor in his persecution of the Oriental Orthodox of his diocese. According to Evagrius Scholasticus, Euphrasius was from Jerusalem.

He died following the massive earthquake in May 526. According to the Zuqnin Chronicle, as the Domus Aurea burned following the earthquake, Euphrasius died after falling into a cauldron of boiling pitch being used by wineskin makers, with only his head remaining unburnt. Another account is that he was crushed under the obelisk of the circus.

Preceded by Paul the Jew	Greek Orthodox Patriarch of Antioch; 521–526	Succeeded by Ephraim of Antioch
