= Shitij Kapur =

Principal of King's College London, England

Shitij Kapur FMedSci

21st Principal of King's College London
- Incumbent
- Assumed office 1 June 2021
- Preceded by: Evelyn Welch (acting)

Personal details
- Education: All India Institute of Medical Sciences, New Delhi (MBBS); University of Toronto (PhD)

Academic work
- Discipline: Psychiatry; Neuroscience
- Institutions: King's College London; University of Melbourne; University of Toronto

Shitij Kapur is a medical doctor and administrator. He has served as the 21st president and principal of King's College London since 1 June 2021. Previously, he was the dean of the Faculty of Medicine Dentistry and Health Sciences and assistant vice-chancellor (health) of the University of Melbourne from 2016 to 2020.

== Early life and education ==
After graduating from AIIMS New Delhi in 1988, Kapur did his residency training in psychiatry at the University of Pittsburgh.

Kapur was a professor of psychiatry at the University of Toronto from 2001 to 2007. From 2007 to 2016, he was the dean and head of school at the Institute of Psychiatry, Psychology and Neuroscience (IoPPN) at King's College London, He is the currently the Vice-chancellor and President of King's College London. He succeeded acting president and principal Evelyn Welch on 1 June 2021.

== University appointments ==
Kapur became president and principal of King's College London in June 2021, replacing Sir Edward Byrne AC and interim principal Evelyn Welch. Prior to his current position, he was dean and assistant vice chancellor (health) at the University of Melbourne from 2016 to 2020 and the executive dean and professor of psychiatry at King's College London until 2016. Prior to that Kapur was a professor of psychiatry at the University of Toronto. While there, he served as the vice-president for research at the Centre for Addiction and Mental Health. From 2001 to 2007, he was a Canada Research Chair at the University of Toronto.

He was elected a Fellow of the Academy of Medical Sciences in 2009.
