= John Beynon (academic) =

British academic (born 1939)

John David Emrys Beynon (born 11 March 1939) is a British academic who served as the 17th Principal of King's College London.

== Biography ==
He was educated at the University of Wales and at the University of Southampton. From 1964 to 1967 he was a lecturer at the University of Southampton. He was Professor of Electronics at the University of Wales Institute of Science and Technology from 1977 to 1979, and then Head of the Department of Electronic and Electrical Engineering at the University of Surrey from 1979 to 1983. He then became Principal of King's College London in 1990, serving until 1992, when he resigned after a breakdown of trust. He is a Fellow of the Institution of Electrical Engineers, the Royal Academy of Engineering, and of King's College London.

He is the secretary of the Bloomsbury Central Baptist Church in London, and after talking with protesters outside a Palestine Solidarity Campaign fund-raising Christmas event hosted by that church, he stated the PSC's presence there was "unreasonable" for the church to have hosted the group owing to its associations with Hamas.

== Notes ==
Academic offices
Preceded by Lord Sutherland of Houndwood	Principal of King's College London; 1990–1992	Succeeded by Arthur Lucas
