= Dictionary of Christian Biography and Literature to the End of the Sixth Century =

1911 religious encyclopedia of biographies

A Dictionary of Christian Biography and Literature to the End of the Sixth Century A.D., with an Account of the Principal Sects and Heresies is a 1911 religious encyclopedia of biographies.

Edited by William C. Piercy and Henry Wace, Dean of Canterbury (1836–1924) in English-language version, it is in the public domain as of 2004. The Christian Classics Ethereal Library has scanned the original printed copy. In 1999, Hendrickson Publishers reprinted it under the title A Dictionary of Early Christian Biography.

Its predecessor was A Dictionary of Christian Biography, Literature, Sects and Doctrines (four volumes, 1877–1887) edited by Wace and William Smith. That in turn represented an updated version of Smith's Bible Dictionary of 1863.
