= Henry Wace (priest) =

British Anglican churchman and historian (1836–1924)

The Very Reverend Henry Wace
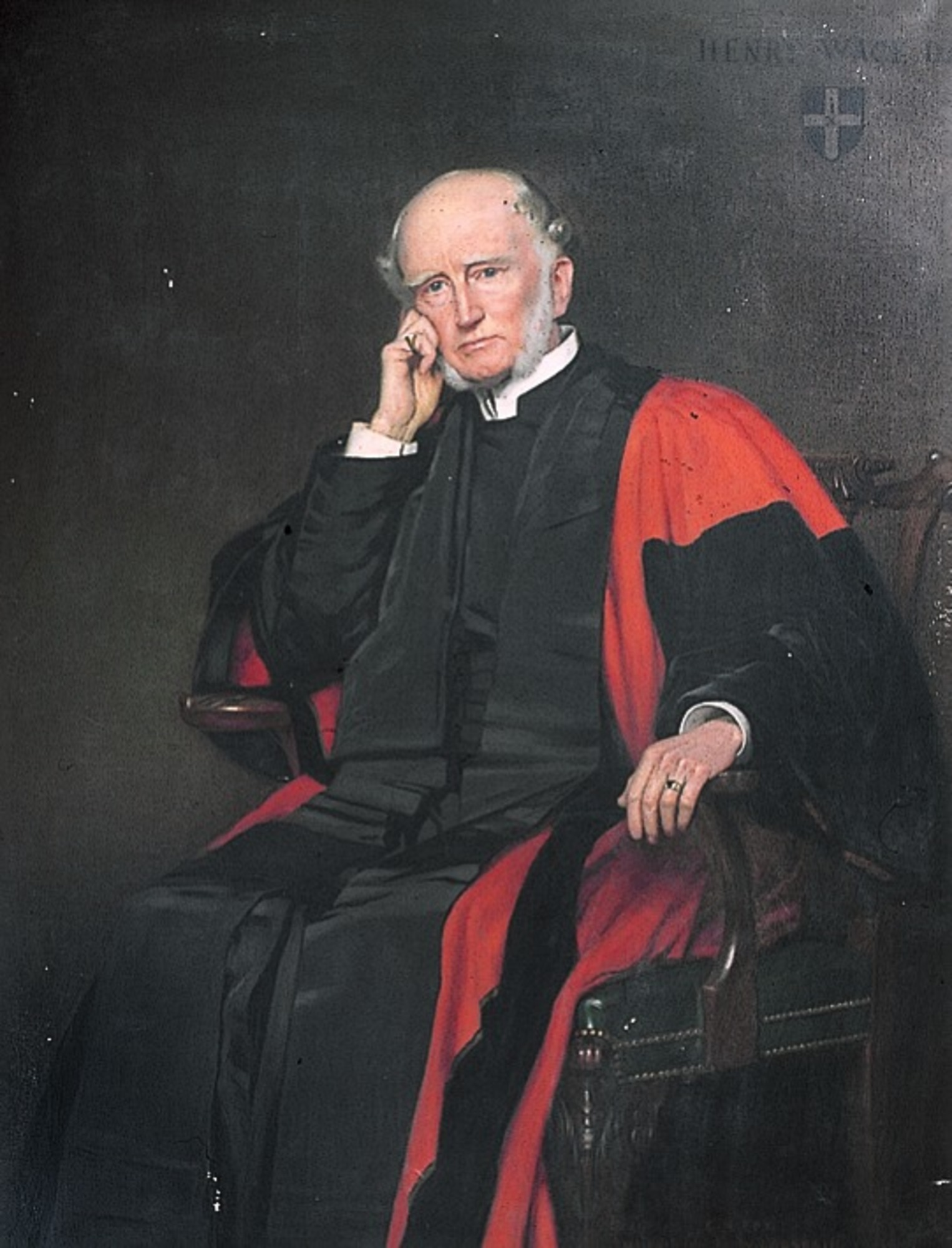
- Wace c. 1919
- Born: 10 December 1836; London, England
- Died: 9 January 1924 (aged 87)
- Title: Principal of King's College, London (1883–1897); Dean of Canterbury (1903–1924)

Ecclesiastical career
- Religion: Christianity (Anglican)
- Church: Church of England
- Ordained: 1861

Academic background
- Education: Brasenose College, Oxford

Academic work
- Discipline: History
- Sub-discipline: Ecclesiastical history
- School or tradition: Evangelical Anglicanism
- Institutions: King's College, London

Henry Wace (10 December 1836 – 9 January 1924) was an English Anglican priest and ecclesiastical historian who served as Principal of King's College, London, from 1883 to 1897 and as Dean of Canterbury from 1903 to 1924. He is described in the Dictionary of National Biography as "an effective administrator, a Protestant churchman of deep scholarship, and a stout champion of the Reformation settlement".

== Early life and education ==
Wace was born in London on 10 December 1836, the eldest son of the Rev. Richard Henry Wace and his wife Eulalia Grey. He was educated at Marlborough College, Rugby School and King's College, London. He matriculated at Brasenose College, Oxford in 1856, graduating BA (in literae humaniores and mathematics) in 1860, and M.A. in 1863. He became an Honorary Fellow in 1911.

== Career ==
He took Holy Orders and served curacies at St Luke's, Berwick Street (1861–63), St James's, Piccadilly (1863–69), and Grosvenor Chapel (1870–72). He moved to Lincoln's Inn, where he served first as Chaplain (1872–80) and later as Preacher (1880–96). He was additionally Chaplain of the Inns of Court Rifle Volunteers (1880–1908) and the Warburton Lecturer for 1896.

In 1875, he became Professor of Ecclesiastical History at King's College, London, of which he served as Principal (1883–97). He was Rector of St Michael's, Cornhill 1896–1903 and Dean of Canterbury from 1903 until his death in 1924. He is buried in the courtyard of the great cloister of the cathedral.

== Writings ==
Wace wrote, contributed to, and edited, many publications in Christian and ecclesiastical history. His best-known work is the Dictionary of Christian Biography and Literature to the End of the Sixth Century A.D., with an Account of the Principal Sects and Heresies, written in collaboration with William Smith. He worked with Philip Schaff on the second series of the Nicene and Post-Nicene Fathers.

From 1902 to 1905 Wace was editor of The Churchman, an evangelical Anglican academic journal.

== Other accomplishments ==
He delivered the Boyle Lectures in 1874 and 1875 and the Bampton Lectures at the University of Oxford in 1879. He was Select Preacher at Oxford in 1880–81 and 1907 and at Cambridge in 1876, 1891, 1903, and 1910.

He was appointed Prebendary of St Paul's Cathedral in 1881 and received the honorary freedom of the City of Canterbury in 1921. In 1922, he played an important role in the foundation of the Bible Churchmen's Missionary Society and was its Vice-President from 1923 until his death on 9 January 1924, following a road traffic accident.

== Publications ==
- Dictionary of Christian Biography and Literature to the End of the Sixth Century A.D., with an Account of the Principal Sects and Heresies
- The War and the Gospel: Sermons & Addresses During the Present War (1917)

Church of England titles
Preceded by Frederic Farrar	Dean of Canterbury; 1903–1924	Succeeded by George Bell
Academic offices
Preceded by Charles Henry Hamilton Wright	Bampton Lecturer; 1879	Succeeded by Edwin Hatch
Preceded by Alfred Barry	Principal of King's College, London; 1883–1897	Succeeded by Archibald Robertson
Other offices
Preceded by	Warburton Lecturer; 1894–1898	Succeeded by Herbert Edward Ryle
