= Imperfectum =

Imperfectum (Latin "unfinished" or "incomplete") may mean:

- Imperfect, a verb form
- Opus Imperfectum, an early Christian commentary on the Gospel of Matthew
- in the Middle Age theory of music
  - for tempi - tempus imperfectum and tempus imperfectum diminutum - see Mensural notation
  - for consonances see Consonance and dissonance#Antiquity and the middle ages
