= Revelation of the Magi =

Early Christian text

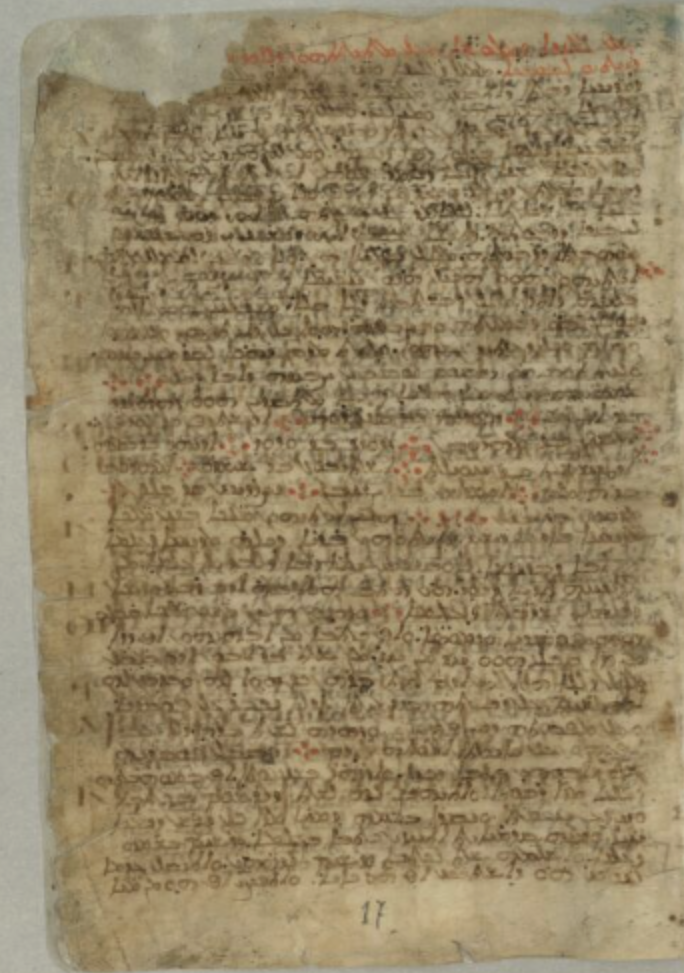
The first page of the Revelation of the Magi, a section of the Zuqnin Chronicle

The Revelation of the Magi is an early Christian writing in Syriac. It is part of the broader set of New Testament apocrypha, religious stories of early Christian figures that did not become canonized in the New Testament. The Revelation of the Magi is pseudepigraphically attributed to the testimony of the Magi, also known as the Wise Men, whose story appears in the Gospel of Matthew's account of the birth of Jesus. It is preserved as part of the Zuqnin Chronicle, an 8th-century Syriac religious history.

According to the work, the Magi originated from a country to the far east called Shir. The star that guided the Magi on their travels was Christ himself; he shifts from a celestial form into a human one both to beckon them on their journey, and transforms again in Bethlehem to instruct them. The Magi return home after meeting the star-child and spread wisdom and compassion. In an epilogue set many years later, they are baptized by the Apostle Judas Thomas in Shir, and he commissions them to spread the Christian message.

== Contents ==
The work is largely an expansion of the story of the Adoration of the Magi found in the Gospel of Matthew. Modern scholars have divided the work into 32 short chapters: a short 2-chapter prologue; a first-person plural account of the Magi's journey in chapters 3–27; and an epilogue in chapters 28–32 where Judas Thomas visits Shir afterward as part of his missionary work to the East.

The magi introduce themselves as part of a religious order in Shir. Twelve magi are listed and given names, although the text largely treats the magi as a collective afterward. The Magi are descendants of Seth, the third child of Adam and Eve. Adam had prophesied to Seth, and Seth had written down Adam's counsel and warnings in books preserved by the Magi and stored in Shir's "Mountain of Victories" where a "Cave of Treasures of Hidden Mysteries" resided. The Magi themselves perform a special ritual monthly wherein they ascend the mountain, purify themselves, pray in silence, and then read Adam's revelations. Generations of Magi have awaited a prophecy of a specific event, where a star's light will come to the Cave of Treasures, illuminate them, and guide them to God. God will be in the form of a weak human being, but nevertheless will lead them to joy and salvation.

The prophesied light comes, so bright that the sun appears as a daytime moon, yet only the Magi can see it. It descends to the cave, transforms into a small human form, and tells the Magi to follow him. The Magi all perceive the transformed human differently, seeing different phases of the Savior's coming life. This long journey passes in the blink of an eye, with the celestial light easing the Magi's fatigue and causing the Magi's food to multiply. As in the Gospel of Matthew, the Magi stop in Jerusalem to ask for information from King Herod and the scribes, but the star warns the Magi that they are "blind" and unworthy to join them in worshiping the coming child. At Bethlehem, the Magi follow the star into a cave that resembles their own cave in Shir. There they witness the star transform into a luminous, talking infant who finds them worthy, and commissions them to spread the good news. Mary and Joseph are worried that the Magi are here to take the child in exchange for their gifts, but the magi explain that the child is both traveling with them (as a star) and also in Mary simultaneously.

The Magi return to Shir. Their food supplies now overflowing from the miraculous multiplication by the star, they share their provisions with the people of Shir; those who eat have visions of Christ's coming deeds and glory. The people grow in faith, love, and good works. In the epilogue, many years later, Thomas the Apostle arrives. Thomas baptizes the Magi and commissions those in Shir to spread the gospel of Jesus across the world, empowering them with the Holy Spirit.

== Authorship, date, and manuscript ==
The Revelation of the Magi survives in only a single manuscript, pages 17r–25r of Vat. sir. 162 in the Vatican Library's collection. It is part of a larger work, the Syriac Chronicle of Pseudo-Dionysius of Tel-Maḥrē, also known as the Zuqnin Chronicle. The manuscript was copied at the Zuqnin Monastery (situated in what was then part of the Abbasid Caliphate; now part of southeastern Turkey) around the 8th century, made its way to Egypt, and then moved to Rome and the Vatican Library in the 18th century. The document appears to incorporate various preexisting texts. Analysis suggests that the compiler seems to have taken these texts fully and not modified them, judging by how sections have a consistent style and voice that abruptly can change in new sections from other sources. This would imply that the 8th-century version is a close match to what the story looked like originally.

When the proposed original was written is unclear. Grammar and word choice suggests an origin in the 5th century or earlier, such as referring to the Holy Spirit with feminine constructions, a style that fell out of practice after 500 CE. Witold Witakowski suggests the 4th century as the most likely, while Brent Landau suggested some point between the late 2nd century and the early 3rd century. The work was definitely written later than the 1st century. Even if the Magi are granted to be historical figures, the work includes clear knowledge of later works of the New Testament that would not be written until a time period when putative historical Magi would be long dead.

The author of the work is unknown. The core narrative, with its first-person writing, is implied to have been an account from the Magi themselves (pseudepigrapha). It is generally thought that most of the work is a unity composed by one author. Two sections have been proposed as possibly independent compositions. It is considered plausible the epilogue with the Apostle Thomas may have been written by a separate author and added later. Chapters 6–10, a recording of a dialogue between Adam and Seth about various theological concerns purportedly in the Magi's prophecies, has also been proposed as a preexisting and independent composition that was integrated into the narrative at some point. The author probably wrote in Syriac; there are no signs of translation in the text, and elements of Syriac wordplay are used. He might have worked in Edessa, a center of early Syrian Christianity and literature that also revered Judas Thomas.

The title "Revelation of the Magi" (or Rev. Magi for short) is a modern convenience; the original title, if any, is unknown. The modern title is taken from the first passage of the work: "About the revelation of the Magi, and about their coming to Jerusalem, and about the gifts they brought to Christ."

== Related works ==
=== Predecessors and inspirations ===
The work is part of a class of Christian apocrypha that were expansions of Bible stories that included more details for curious believers, in this case the story of the Magi found in Matthew 2 of the Gospel of Matthew. There are a few changes and additions. While the Magi give gifts as in the story in Matthew, the text says that they have received the greater gift in return – the "treasure of salvation." The Massacre of the Innocents from Matthew is not mentioned, nor is the family's flight to Egypt. The narrative also makes no attempt to integrate the nativity story from the Gospel of Luke, although one or two stray expressions might be quotes of Luke. Some of the themes suggest a familiarity with Johannine theology and the Gospel of John, such as the use of light in a positive sense as related to the divine.

The author of the epilogue was likely familiar with the Acts of Thomas, or at least a knowledge of shared traditions of Thomas's legend that describe Thomas traveling east for missionary work in the apostolic age. Thomas appears to have been the chief apostolic figure in ancient Syriac-speaking Christianity, particularly in Edessa. The work seems to be familiar with an epiclesis of oil in the style of a Syriac rite reminiscent of such a blessing done in the Acts of Thomas.

The Liber de Nativitate Salvatoris, an infancy gospel, describes the star of Bethlehem in a very similar way. It similarly expands on the magi's history and journey, though it is unclear whether the infancy gospel or the Revelation of the Magi came first.

Elsewhere within the Zuqnin Chronicle itself (but not part of the Revelation of the Magi section), Adam's Cave of Treasures is described as being in a mountain called Shir (rather than a country called Shir), on folio 3. The story of Seth's descendants maintaining a secret cave of Adam's special knowledge seems to have been popular in Syrian Christianity, as seen in the Syriac work "Cave of Treasures".

=== Later influences ===
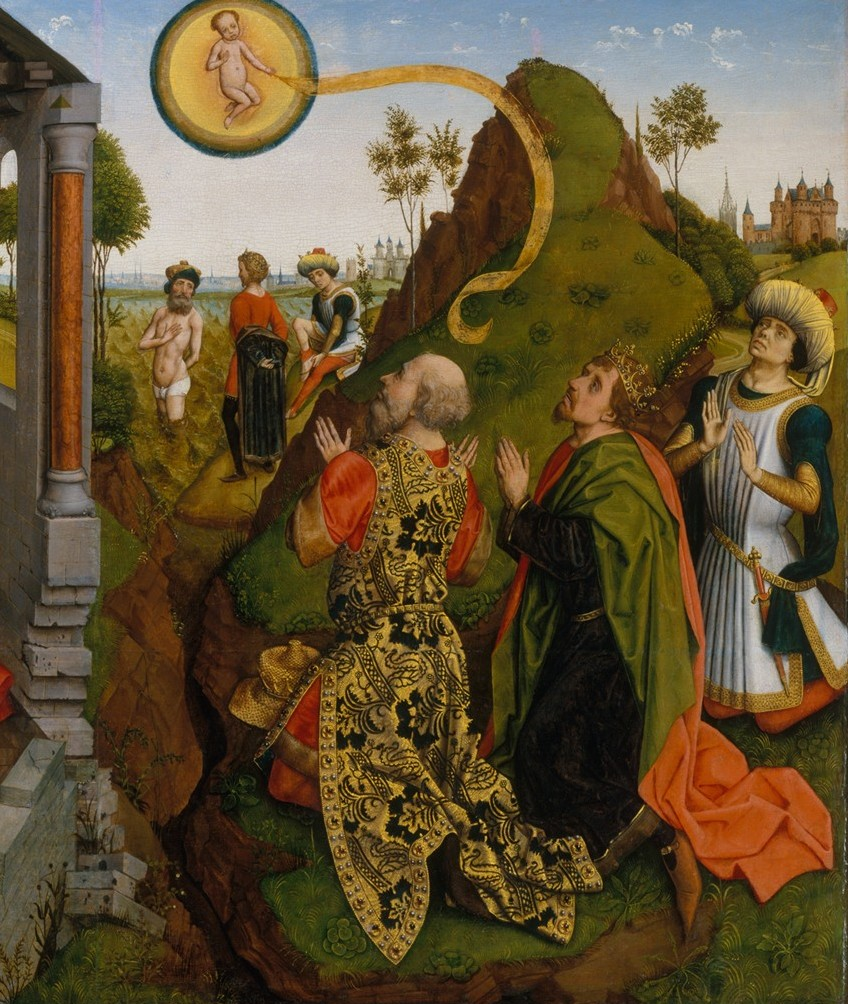
A section of the 15th-century "The Nativity Polyptych" depicting the Magi and the Star, by the associated circle of Rogier van der Weyden. It depicts the Star of Bethlehem as Christ itself – an element possibly originating from the Revelation of the Magi.

The Opus Imperfectum in Matthaeum, a 5th-century commentary on the Gospel of Matthew, seems to display familiarity with the Revelation of the Magi and provides a short summary of it in a fragment called the Liber apocryphum nomine Seth. This is another reason why scholars prefer an earlier date than the 8th century for the origin of the work. In the medieval era, the Opus Imperfectum was incorrectly believed to have been authored by Church Father John Chrysostom, helping ensure it circulated and was copied by scribes. Later popular works, such as the Speculum Humanae Salvationis, likely also drew from the summary of the Revelation of the Magi in the Opus Imperfectum.

A stray comment by the 8th-century theologian Theodore bar Konai suggests he might have been familiar with the work. He writes that the Magi arrived in April, and the Revelation of the Magi is the only surviving ancient source that specifies that month.

Brent Landau argues that some of the ideas seen in the Revelation affected how the Magi were perceived even after the work itself had become obscure. Landau cites as an example the writings of the 17th-century Augustinian friar Antonio de la Calancha, who studied the Andean traditional religions practiced in South America (then part of the Viceroyalty of Peru in the Spanish Empire). Calancha was impressed by the resemblances to Christianity in these belief systems, and hypothesized that St. Thomas and the Magi must have proselytized to them as described in the Opus Imperfectum in Matthaeum.

== Analysis ==
=== Identity of Shir ===
These are kings, sons of Eastern kings, in the land of Shir, which is the outer part of the entire East of the world inhabited by human beings, at the Ocean, the great sea beyond the world, east of the land of Nod, that place in which dwelt Adam, head and chief of all the families of the world.

— Revelation of the Magi, 2:4

It is not known what exactly the author knew of the eastern lands in their reference to "Shir" (Šir). Based on similar references in other literature, it was perhaps a semi-mystical version of ancient China. The work does not go into detail on its idea of Shir's culture, though, making it more of an "imagined country". Classical-era thought portrayed the people at the "periphery" of the known world in various fanciful ways, but attributing superior, secret knowledge to them was one of the tropes that could be applied to them.

An origin so far to the east is in contrast to other Christian works on the topic, which usually portrayed the Magi as coming from Persia, Babylonia, or Arabia. Most Syrian works suggested Persia as their origin.

=== Visionary experiences ===
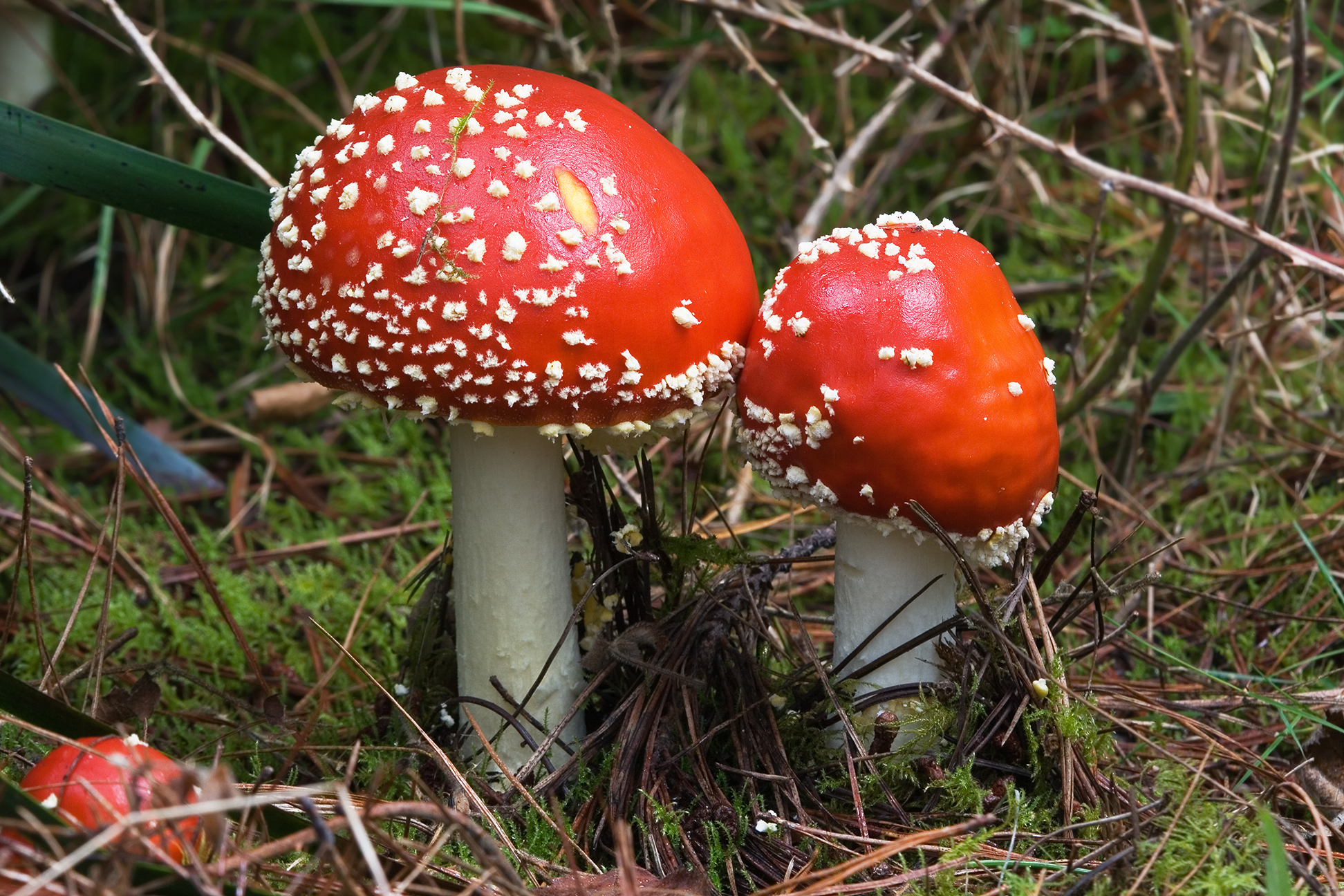
Two fly agaric mushrooms, noted for their hallucinogenic properties

There was one of them saying, "At the moment I ate of these provisions, I saw a great light that has no likeness in the world." And there is one saying, "I saw God bearing himself in the world as he wished." And there is one saying, "I saw a star of light that darkened the sun by its light." And there is one saying, "I saw a human being whose appearance is more unsightly than a man, and he is saving and purifying the world by his blood and by his humble appearance."

— Revelation of the Magi, 28:1-2

Brent Landau argued that the author was influenced by visions while on hallucinogens, perhaps hallucinogenic mushrooms. After the Magi return to their homeland, they tell the people that they, too can experience the amazing spiritual visions the Magi have – all they have to do is eat the food that the star has mysteriously multiplied. The work does not go into detail on the nature of the food, merely calling them "provisions", but the passage does suggest the author's group may have held spiritual rituals involving whichever hallucinogen they favored.

=== Epilogue ===
And Judas [Thomas] said to them: "Therefore, my brethren, let us fulfill the Commandment of our Lord, who said to us: 'Go out into the entire world and preach my Gospel.'"

— Revelation of the Magi, 31:10

The epilogue is thought to potentially have been written by a different author. There are some differences in vocabulary and grammar. (Note: In the epilogue, the magi are called "nobles" (ܪܘܪ̈ܒܢܐ), unlike elsewhere which uses 'magi' (ܡܓܘ ̈ܫܐ); the term "Jesus" is used directly for the first time with frequent references to "my Lord Jesus Christ"; and the narration awkwardly shifts to the third person.) Additionally, the theology and history is somewhat more conventional. In the main story, the star-child directly commissions the Magi and they start spreading divine wisdom immediately; they are essentially commissioned again in the epilogue and are told to continue what they are already doing. Possibly this was an attempt to make the Magi more conventional Christians, rather than have them essentially be Christians prior to Jesus's ministry on the basis of a private revelation.

== Theology ==
Scholars have taken several theological points from the text. The Magi are aspirational figures in the work. They partake in a strongly bound religious community, keep to their strictures, pray frequently, and obey the guidance of the star. As a result, God stays close by and ensures the success of their pilgrimage. In contrast to stories that play up the necessity of suffering for Christians, their pilgrimage is not portrayed as arduous or sacrificial, but rather as quick and pleasant. Presumably if believers maintain themselves likewise, they will be similarly blessed.

The Revelation of the Magi does not appear to be particularly affected by Gnostic thought, but shares a few similarities in terms of passages using absolutist language similar to those in some Gnostic works. For example, it calls Herod a "dwelling of error", similar to condemnations seen in works such as the Gospel of Truth. The interest in the legend of Seth shares similarities with Sethian Gnosticism seen in works such as the Apocryphon of John, such as calling the magi from the "race of light."

The Magi being from far away emphasizes the universality of God's revelation. Regardless of how broadly the author intended this, the work clearly thinks that at minimum, all Christians have access to Christ. This is in some contrast to parts of the New Testament that depict Jesus being in only one place at any given time; the work indicates that all believers have access to an omnipresent Jesus, all the time.

Brent Landau argues that the epilogue was probably a later addition to the work, and that this informs how the theology of the main section should be interpreted. If the epilogue with its conventional commissioning and numerous references to "Jesus" by name is set aside, the Magi have a revelatory experience with the one true God, but never know that God by the name "Jesus". If taken this way, the work is sending a pluralistic message that suggests that people in far-off lands could and did know God, but in forms that were not obviously Christianity. While this view appears to have been a minority one, it was not completely unheard of. In the late 2nd / early 3rd century, Syrian Christian Bardaisan of Edessa asserted that Christianity already existed among the Geli and Cashani peoples of Central Asia as Christianity had been planted in every country "at his [Christ's] coming". It is a framework that lets the author proclaim Jesus is God, yet say that other religions might also have come from Jesus via other divine revelations.

== Translations ==
I.B. Chabot published a translation of the full Zuqnin Chronicle into Latin in 1949. The first translation of the Revelation of the Magi section into English was by Brent Landau in 2008, published in book form in 2010:

- Landau, Brent (2010). Revelation of the Magi: The Lost Tale of the Wise Men's Journey to Bethlehem. HarperOne.
  - Landau, Brent (2008). The Sages and the Star-Child: An Introduction to the Revelation of the Magi, An Ancient Christian Apocryphon. (Landau's PhD thesis)

== See also ==
- Botanical identity of soma–haoma, another case of an unknown hallucinogen described in religious literature
- Legend of Aphroditian, another Christian work of the 3rd-5th century expanding the story of the Magi

== Bibliography ==
- Landau, Brent (2010). Revelation of the Magi: The Lost Tale of the Wise Men's Journey to Bethlehem. HarperOne. ISBN 9780062020239.
- Playoust, Catherine (2022). "Revelation of the Magi". In Edwards, J. Christopher (ed.). Early New Testament Apocrypha. Ancient Literature for New Testament Studies 9. Zondervan Academic. pp. 175–191. ISBN 9780310099710.
