= Anianus of Celeda =

5th-century Greek presbyter

Anianus (sometimes Annianus) of Celeda was the deacon of a church at a place called Celeda in the early fifth century and a supporter of Pelagius. It is not known where Celeda was: candidates include Pannonia, Northern Italy, Campania, Syria, and Cyrenaica.

He translated two collections of homilies by John Chrysostom into Latin, including the first 25 of Chrysostom's 90 homilies on the Gospel of Matthew and seven homilies in praise of the apostle St. Paul. These translations were known to Augustine of Hippo, Pope Leo I, Cassiodorus, and Bede.

A critical edition of Anianus' Letter to Orontius, which serves as the preface to his translations of Chrysostom's Homilies 1–25 on Matthew, has been published by Adolf Primmer.

A study of the manuscript tradition of Anianus' Latin translation of Chrysostom's Commentary on Matthew and the critical edition of homily 9 have been published by Emilio Bonfiglio.

A digital transcription of Anianus' prefatory letter to his Latin translations of Chrysostom's homilies 1–25 on Matthew and the first eight homilies from PG 58, 975–1058, as well as Chrysostom's homilies De laudibus sancti Pauli apostoli from PG 50, 473–514, are provided online among the Auxiliary Resources on The Electronic Manipulus florum Project website, which also provides a digital transcription of Anianus' Latin translations of Chrysostom's homilies 1–25 on Matthew and his prefatory letter from the 1503 Venice editio princeps. Note that the versions in Migne's edition of De laudibus Pauli in PL 50 and the 1503 Venice edition are significantly different.

The Opus Imperfectum in Matthaeum (Pseudo-Chrysostom) is sometimes attributed to Anianus.
