= Legend of Aphroditian =

3rd century New Testament apocrypha

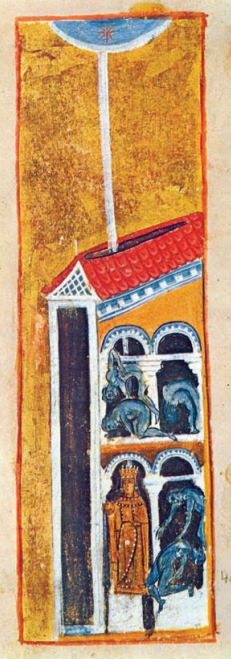
A star appears over the statue of Pege, and the other statues bow down before her. From an illustrated manuscript depicting a scene in The Legend of Aphroditian, Mount Athos Esphigmenou Codex 14, an 11th-century manuscript.

The Legend of Aphroditian (or Aphroditianus), also known as the Narrative of Events Happening in Persia on the Birth of Christ, is an expansion of the story of the Adoration of the Magi found in the Gospel of Matthew. It is often known as a section of De gestis in Perside, a 6th-century story detailing a debate between Christians, pagans, and Jews in Sasanian Persia. The Legend of Aphroditian is a part of New Testament apocrypha, stories of New Testament figures that did not become canonized. The oldest extant manuscripts are written in the Koine Greek language, and pre-modern translations into other languages such as Slavonic exist. It was probably originally written at some point c. 200–500 in the era of early Christianity.

In the legend, the Persian king goes to the temple of the goddess Hera to have a strange dream interpreted. Unusual events have happened in the Temple; talking statues of the Greek gods foresee the end of their honor and the beginning of a new era. After a revelatory experience, the king dispatches the Magi (also known as the Wise Men) to Judea to follow the Star of Bethlehem which appeared. There, they preach to the Jews and meet the newly born Jesus before returning home. There is a rare early depiction of Mary's appearance: she is described as dainty, with fair grain-colored skin, and simple but beautiful hair. A major message of the story is that the time of pagan idols and Jewish synagogues have passed, and they should be replaced by works such as depictions of the Virgin Mother and Child, icons as new foci of devotion.

== Contents ==
The Persian king goes to visit the temple of Hera to have a dream interpreted, and is told by the priest Proupippos that the statues were dancing the whole night. The statues argued with each other; it seems Hera is pregnant. Several alternate names are suggested for her: Urania, the Queen of Heaven; Myria ("the thousandfold"); and Pege (literally: "source" or "spring"). Other statues say that Pege has a "carpenter", but a carpenter of the whole celestial roof. A star appears over the statue of Pege, and announces the forthcoming newborn who will be the beginning of salvation. The other statues all fall down upon their faces, with the statue of Pege alone standing. The king orders wise interpreters of this to be brought to the temple.

The wise men (Magi) see the star above the statue of Pege and the royal diadem of carbuncle and emerald that has appeared fastened on her. They conclude this is a heavenly announcement of forthcoming marvels on Earth, and that a new kingdom is coming. The statues bowing down prefigures the end of their honor, and all the memorials of the Jews will be abolished as well. The god Dionysus visits the temple and declares Pege now stands far above the other gods. The king sends the Magi to Judea with fine gifts.

In Jerusalem, the Magi announce the coming of the Messiah and denounce the Jewish leaders and scribes for falling away from belief. King Herod is ignored as a "worthless person". They travel to Bethlehem, where they worship the young Jesus and meet with the Virgin Mary. They lavish praise on Mary as the Mother of Mothers and the most queenly of queens. A servant travelling with them skilled in painting makes a portrait of the pair to bring back to the temple.

Warned by an angel about Herod, the Magi return to Persia. There, the tale is inscribed on golden plates, which are the putative source of the story.

== Background ==
Stories that expanded the gospels were popular among curious Christians in the Roman era who were eager for more details. These non-canonical stories were later classified as New Testament apocrypha.

The pericope of the Adoration of the Magi is found in the Gospel of Matthew. The account in Matthew 2 is rather short and leaves quite a lot of details to the imagination, however, such as where the Magi came from and how they were able to interpret the star. The author was probably familiar with Matthew's version, although since similar other traditions of the Magi circulated in early Christianity, it cannot be known for sure that the author had read Matthew.

While the story is set in Persia, ruled by the Parthian Empire in the era of Jesus and the Sasanian Empire at the probable time of authorship, the author was certainly not Persian, and there was no actual temple dedicated to Hera near some Parthian or Sasanian palace. Rather, the author was likely a Greek-speaking Christian in the eastern half of the Roman Empire, and was applying their knowledge of the local Hellenistic religion, the syncretic form of Greek paganism common in the era.

== Authorship and date ==
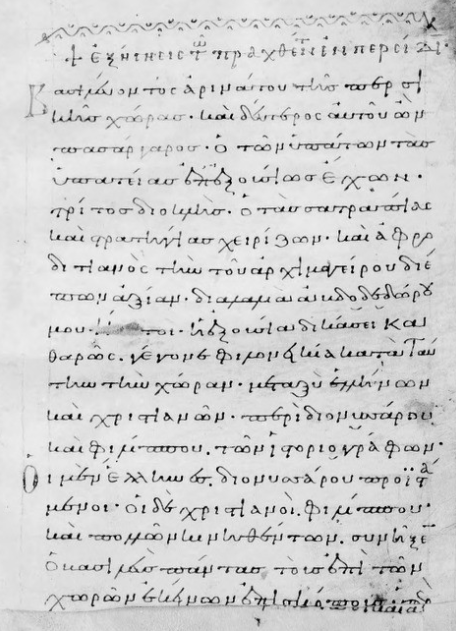
Page from an 11th-century manuscript of De Gestis in Perside, held by the Bibliothèque nationale de France (Gr 1084)

The date of the oldest surviving manuscript containing the story is a 5th- or 6th-century manuscript of De gestis in Perside ("The Debate in Persia"), providing a terminus ante quem. The story of Perside is one of a fictional dispute between pagans, Jews, and Christians set in Persia. The Persian king brings in Aphroditian, a learned pagan, to serve as moderator and judge of the debate; Aphroditian proceeds to agree with the Christians and lauds them as correct. One of the pieces of evidence Aphroditian brings up in favor of the Christians is the account of the Magi and their travels inscribed on golden tablets, which is then recounted in full in the manuscript – The Legend of Aphroditian. De gestis in Perside was attributed to the second-century historian Sextus Julius Africanus by German scholars of the 19th century. Later scholars have thought this attribution unlikely, and attributed it to a misreading of a Greek abbreviation "Aphr" as referring to Africanus in manuscripts found in Munich but not elsewhere. "Aphr" probably meant an attribution to the mysterious Aphroditian, instead.

Katharina Heyden proposes that De gestis in Perside was adapting and including an existing story. In particular, some of the themes of the legend recounted by Aphroditian seem to resonate better with pre-Constantine Christianity of the 3rd century. In this era, stories purporting to prove the truth of Christianity from virtuous pagan sources or pagan seers were popular among Christians, such as the Sibylline Oracles. Additionally, Heyden suggests the depiction of Hera and her multiple names seems as if it might be a good analogue for the cult of Atargatis, a Syrian goddess identified with Hera and sometimes also called Urania, Queen of Heaven. She suggests a possible Syrian Christian origin as a result. Additionally, the theology is still somewhat immature compared to the more deeply developed doctrines of the 5th and 6th centuries, also arguing for an early origin. Still, Heyden grants it is impossible to know for sure, and the intensity of the Marian devotion would be unusual for the 3rd century. She grants that a 4th- or 5th-century origin that adapted 3rd-century material would also be consistent with her hypothesis.

The oldest manuscript is in Koine Greek. If De gestis in Perside really was including an adaptation of a preexisting manuscript, the original is considered likely to have been Greek as well, as scholars do not see signs of the work being a translation.

Philip of Side, a Christian historian active in the 5th century, is mentioned in some manuscripts as an author of the legend, although this is considered unlikely; he may have been a transmitter and recorder of the text, though.

== Cultural influence ==
The story was most commonly seen in Slavic-language works; it was popular in medieval Russia, and a translation into Old Church Slavonic was made early in its history. 92 surviving Slavic-language manuscripts are known, and the work was sometimes read in Slavic Christmas liturgies. In Russian works, Aphroditian was grouped with other virtuous pagans said to have predicted and validated Christianity, including Homer and Plato.

It was seen occasionally in Greek manuscripts, but almost always as part of the larger De gestis in Perside. It seems it was popular in the medieval Byzantine Church, although much of the knowledge of this period is obscure and lost. The 8th-century Christian writer John of Damascus incorporated the story into his Homily on the Incarnation of Christ (Homilia in nativitatem Domini).

Manuscripts differ from each other, leading to some variations in the story. As an example, John of Damascus's version entirely omits Chapter 5, where Dionysus gives a speech about the end of the era of the Greek Gods and the coming era of the one God. John of Damascus also includes a passage where the Magi all report seeing different versions of Jesus, a "polymorphic" Jesus who appears as both a baby, a middle-aged man, and an elderly man. The Slavonic tradition ends differently than the Greek one. In the Greek editions, the final passages are accusatory toward those who are opposed to Jesus, while one Slavonic version ends instead with a prayer and doxology, suggesting use in liturgy.

The story was very obscure in the Latin-speaking Western Church. It was not until the 19th century that Western interest was mildly kindled in the work, largely Germans of the history of religions school. They were interested in the relationships between Roman pagan cults and early Christianity. Johann Christoph von Aretin published a Greek text based on the two manuscripts in Munich in 1804 along with a Latin translation, which was later used as a basis for a translation into English in Ante-Nicene Fathers. Eduard Bratke published a composite version of De gestis in Perside consulting many more manuscripts in 1899.

== Analysis ==
=== Mariology ===
For she was small in stature even when she stood upright, and had a delicate body, wheat-colored; and she had her hair bound with a simple, very beautiful hairstyle.

— Legend of Aphroditian, 8:4

The text is openly admiring of the role of Mary, mother of Jesus. She is referred to with various exalted titles akin to those of mother deities, such as "Mother of the First of All Orders" and "divine and royal root that shapes the image of the heavenly and earthly king". Mary's pregnancy is identified with Hera-Urania-Myria-Pege's pregnancy, possibly as a vessel or successor. Notably, one of Hera's abilities was bathing in a spring or bath that magically restored her virginity. Devotion to Mary is clearly seen as a proper successor to devotion to pagan cults, with the icon of the Mother and Child brought to a pagan temple as a replacement for the previous objects of worship.

The male and female statues in the temple debate the exact nature of what happened with Hera, her name, and her pregnancy. This might be a reflection of some lost Mariological debate of the time.

There are some parallels of stories of miraculous portraits of Jesus in other Christian literature. The Doctrine of Addai, a 5th-century Syrian work, features a portrait of Jesus made by Hannan, a similarly gifted slave. The portrait is brought by King Abgar to become the Image of Edessa in that story.

=== Depiction of the Magi ===
Immediately the king gave an order to bring together all wise interpreters of prodigies who are under his dominion.

— Legend of Aphroditian, 4:1

Accounts in Early Christianity varied of the Magi in both details and tone. Some treated them with hostility, as astrologers who sought the Messiah for evil reasons, and were only converted by the direct presence of Jesus. Other works described different points of origin for the Magi, such as Babylonia or Arabia. This work has a firmly and clearly positive view of the Magi: they are correct in all their statements and wise enough to understand the coming of Christianity for what it is. The text is also quite complimentary toward Persia, depicting it as a font of wisdom – a sentiment found in some other works as well.

=== Anti-Judaism ===
Judea has bloomed, but now it is withering. To gentiles and foreigners salvation has come.

— Legend of Aphroditian, 5:4

The preaching has an anti-Jewish sentiment and a supersessionist theology. The Magi, without even having seen Christ, already proclaim to the Jews of Jerusalem that they are "suffering from unbelief" and pursuing their own thoughtless goals, and that Christ has come to "annul your law and your synagogues." In this, the work differs somewhat from the Gospel of Matthew, which has Jesus as fulfillment of Jewish prophecies as a major theme. In The Legend of Aphroditian, it is pagan seers who have correctly foretold the coming of the Messiah, and seemingly only them.

The Jewish leaders try to silence the Magi with gifts of money. King Herod, the main villain in Matthew, has more a secondary role here; it is the Jewish authorities and scribes the work depicts as the primary unbelievers.

That said, one manuscript (Palat. gr. 4) does weaken the anti-Jewish tendency somewhat, replacing the coming abolishment of the memorials of "the Jews" with "the Kings".

The text is supersessionist in that it sees the pagan tradition, too, as ending. It has a notably more positive slant, though, where the Greek deities themselves seem to accept and celebrate this as a natural progression. In contrast, the Jewish authorities resist the coming end of Judaism and its replacement by Christianity.

== Translations ==
Published translations of the story into English include:

- Roberts, Alexander; Donaldson, James, eds. (1888). "Narrative of Events Happening in Persia on the Birth of Christ" . Ante-Nicene Fathers. Vol. 6. Christian Literature Company – via Wikisource.
- Heyden, Katharina (2016). "The Legend of Aphroditianus: A new translation and introduction". In Burke, Tony; Landau, Brent (eds.). New Testament Apocrypha: More Noncanonical Scriptures. Vol. 1. Eerdmans. ISBN 9780802872890.

== See also ==
- Revelation of the Magi, a Syrian Christian work of the 3rd–5th-century featuring the Magi
- On the Syrian Goddess (De Dea Syria), a 2nd-century work attributed to the satirist Lucian of Samosata on the cult of Atargatis

== Bibliography ==
- Heyden, Katharina (2009). Die Erzählung des Aphroditian [The Legend of Aphroditian]. Studien und Texte zu Antike und Christentum 53 (in German). Morh Siebeck. doi:10.1628/978-3-16-151352-7. ISBN 978-3-16-151352-7.
- Heyden, Katharina (2016). "The Legend of Aphroditianus: A new translation and introduction". In Burke, Tony; Landau, Brent (eds.). New Testament Apocrypha: More Noncanonical Scriptures. Vol. 1. Eerdmans. ISBN 9780802872890.
- Heyden, Katharina (2022). "The Legend of Aphroditian". In Edwards, J. Christopher (ed.). Early New Testament Apocrypha. Ancient Literature for New Testament Studies 9. Zondervan Academic. pp. 115–127. ISBN 9780310099710.

Further reading

- Bratke, Eduard (2010) [1899]. Bratke, Eduard (ed.). Das sogenannte Religionsgespräch am Hof der Sasaniden [The so-called religious debate at the Court of the Sassanids]. Classics in the History of Early Christian Literature 24 (in German). Gorgias Press. doi:10.31826/9781463227609. ISBN 978-1-4632-2760-9.
- Monneret de Villard, Ugo (1952). Le leggende orientali sui magi evangelici [Eastern Legends of the Evangelical Magi]. Studi e Testi 163 (in Italian). Biblioteca apostolica vaticana.
- Veder, William R. (2011). "The Slavonic Tale of Aphroditian: Limitations of Manuscript–Centred Textology" (PDF). Tŭrnovska knizhovna shkola Търновска книжовна школа. 9 (1): 344–358. doi:10.54664/PKGO8200.
