= Cave of Treasures =

6th–7th century Syriac pseudepigrapha

Cave of Treasures ܡܥܪܬ ܓܙܐ
- British Library
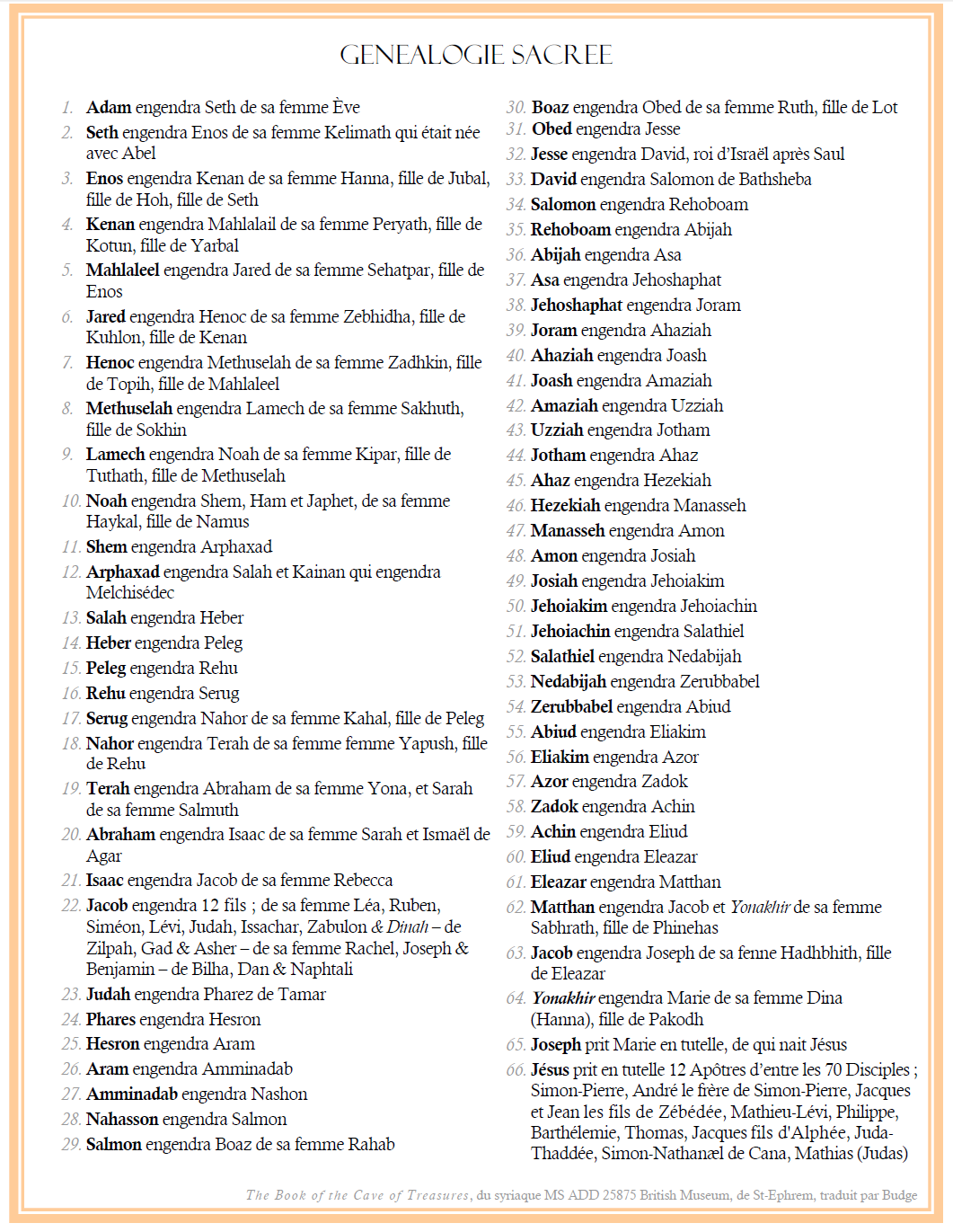
- French genealogy of Christ, cf. Book of the Cave of Treasure (from the Syriac MS Add 25875, British Museum), translated by E. W. Budge
- Type: Pseudepigrapha "rewritten Bible"
- Date: 6th century
- Place of origin: Upper Mesopotamia
- Language: Syriac
- Author(s): Unknown; falsely attributed to Ephrem the Syrian
- Contents: Syriac Christian retelling of biblical history and prefiguration of Christ, interweaving Jewish, Assyrian, and early Christian traditions with moral and liturgical teachings

The Cave of Treasures (Syriac: ܡܥܪܬ ܓܙܐ, romanized: Maʿarraṯ ġazzē) is pseudepigraphal work of Syriac literature that retells biblical narrative within a distinctly Christian and Mesopotamian setting. Originally composed in Syriac, it provides a then-modern Christian interpretation of the Old Testament from the creation of Adam to the coming of Christ, and presents Adam and the patriarchs as prefigurations of Christ, and also situating key events in Assyria and surrounding regions. The narrative incorporates local Mesopotamian traditions by presenting figures such as Nimrod in a positive light and linking biblical history to the cultural memory of the Assyrian and Persian world.

The text was an important part of shaping the Syriac Christian identity, elevating the status of the Syriac language, providing theological responses to Jewish critique, and addressing cultural and religious dynamics near the Sasanian Empire. It also provides a major source of information regarding the secular history of the region and the turbulent problems that Upper Mesopotamia faced. It circulated widely in multiple recensions and languages and influenced later Syriac historiography, including among authors such as the author of the Chronicle of Zuqnin, Michael the Syrian, and Barhebraeus.

== Authorship ==
The Cave of Treasures was long attributed to Ephrem the Syrian (c. 306–373) due to some manuscripts bearing a heading that names him, but modern scholarship has completely rejected this attribution. The text was first quoted in a mid-7th century work and shows no awareness of the Islamic conquests, indicating that it must have been composed before 630 AD. It even mentions the late Sassanian king Khosrow II (r. 590–628). The text's multiple and frequent apologetic attacks against Jews also suggest a 7th-century composition, which was a time when Christians hoped that widespread conversion and baptism of Jews would prepare the way for the Second Coming.

Multiple theories have been advanced regarding its authorship. Albrecht Goetze argued that it was a compilation of three separate 4th-century Jewish-Christian works: one concerning legends about Adam and Seth, one on the genealogy of Mary, and one on the life of Christ. These were then edited together by a Syriac-language writer from the Church of the East who supplemented the text with biblical material and theological interpolations. Sebastian Brock has further noted that the work was addressed to an unknown figure named Nemesius. This Nemesius, or Nemosaya (Syriac: ܢܡܘܣܝܐ) as rendered in the primary works, is perhaps related to the Greek nomikos (νομικὸς), which means "lawyer" and could possibly refer to the Torah or Judaism in general.

The author demonstrates a strong pride in the Syriac language, elevating it above all other dialects of Aramaic, and likely moved between the eastern and western provinces of the Syriac-speaking world. It is presented chronologically over seven millennia, relying on a variety of sources, most of which are Christian. The Cave of Treasures was later influential for a number of authors, including the author of the Chronicle of Zuqnin, al-Ya'qubi, al-Tabari, Eutychius of Alexandria, Michael the Great, Barhebraeus, and Solomon of Basra.

The cave in question refers to an unnamed cave in Upper Mesopotamia where, after the Fall, Adam deposited gold, frankincense, and myrrh. Later, when Christ was born, the Magi arrived at the cave to retrieve the gifts and present them to the newborn Son.

== Content ==
The Cave of Treasures belongs to the genre of "rewritten Bible" that recounts biblical history from the creation of the world to the life of Christ within a different framework; in this case, a Syriac one. It emphasizes salvation history, the continuity of God's plan, and the prefiguration of Christ throughout earlier events. The text situates its narrative setting in Assyria, identified with the land of "Nod". Assyria serves as the central stage of the work: it is where Cain is exiled, where the Magi receive incense, and where the journeys of Nimrod — a pivotal figure in the story — take place. The Arsacids identify Adiabene with Nod-Shirakan, and the toponym "Nod" appears in inscriptions from Karka de-Beth Slouq and Erbil. Like the Syriac tradition at large, the work shows a favorable view of the Assyrian king Nimrod, who in the biblical tradition is remembered as an adversary of Abraham.

=== Biblical narrative and Christological prefiguration ===
The text retells the Old Testament, presenting Adam and his descendants as "prophets, priests, and kings" foreshadowing Christ. Adam's body and Abel's blood are explicitly paralleled with Christ, while the burial of patriarchs in Jerusalem, at the site where Christ himself would be buried, reinforces this prefiguration. Abraham's offering of tithes to Melchizedek at Golgotha is depicted as an anticipation of the Eucharist, while Noah's reception of the dove at the ark prefigures baptism. Patriarchal lives and biblical events are thus presented as direct anticipations of the incarnation.

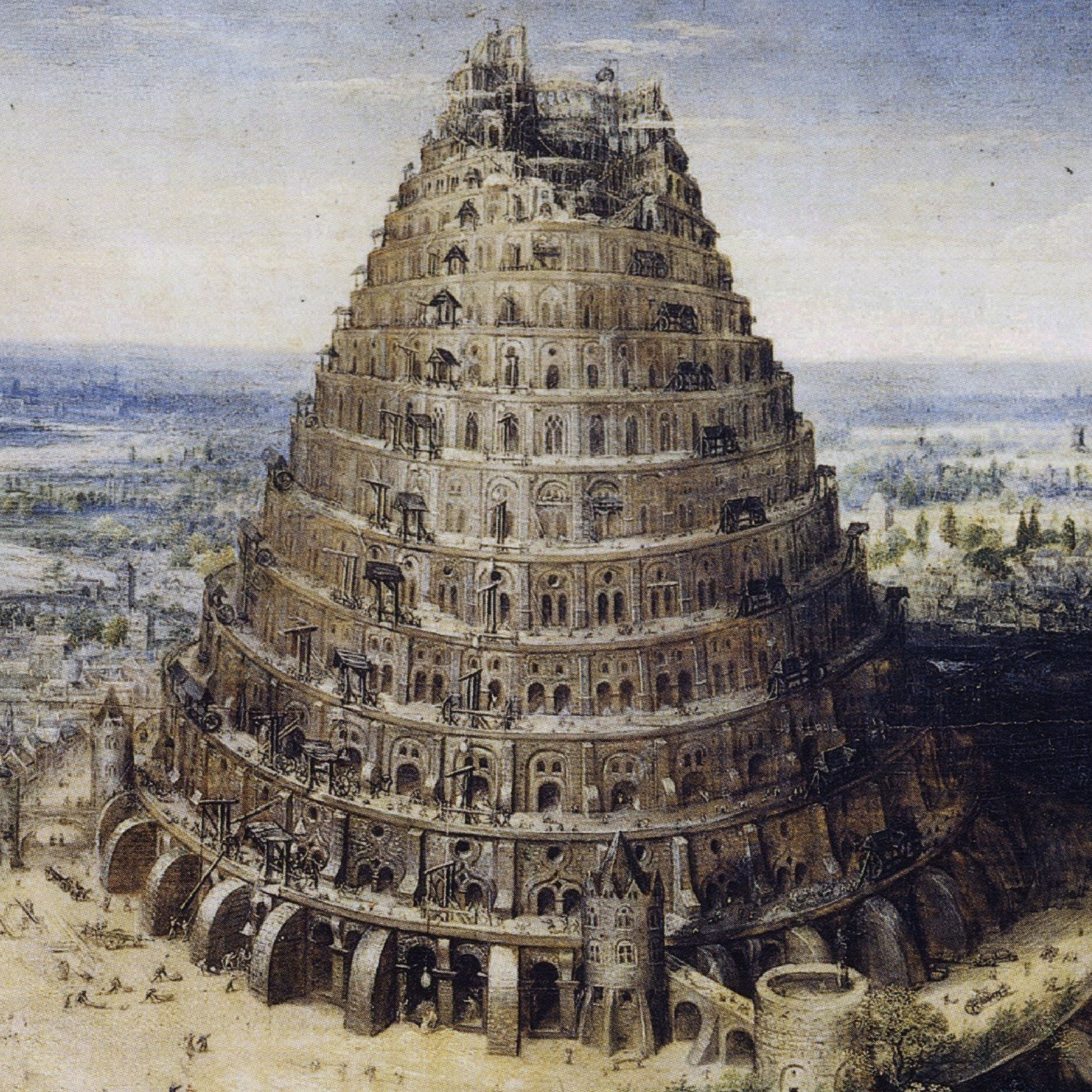
According to the Book of Genesis, humanity spoke a single language and decided to build a city and tower that would reach the heavens, so Yahweh dispersed them by making their languages unintelligible, leaving the city unfinished

The societies described are also presented as moral examples, such as Noah's gender segregation in the ark and the peace between different social orders. Furthermore, they are used to justify modern Christian practices that were controversial in the Roman and Sassanian churches of the time, particularly the Naziritic practices, such as wearing skins or leaving hair uncut, as Noah commands Shem to do. The descriptions of Shem and Melchizedek are similar in Theodoret of Cyrrhus's Historia Religiosa and Rabbula's banned canons in the Bnay Qyama; such practices were considered sacred and orthodox, obligations for priest to abide by.

The freedom with which the author makes these assertions shows how fluid and loosely defined early Church canons were and the limited power of the Church to enforce them. Additionally, in the absence of a strongly policed state like that of Justinian I, Jewish communities were able to critique Christianity, including questions concerning the genealogy of Christ. The text addresses such criticisms while also reinforcing Christianity's distinct identity in relation to surrounding religious traditions.

Adam's resting place at Golgotha is described as the "center of the world" where major events in soteriology occur. The Cave deliberately omits sections critical to Judaism such as those of Moses in the Book of Exodus to maintain the biblical account in a Christian framework.

The text also describes multiple "falls" of humanity beyond the events at Eden. The first one involves the loss of virginity after the initial fall, yet Seth's offsprings are committed to abstaining from fornication, unlike Cain's offsprings. These two oppositions emphasize the value of asceticism, where Seth is honored for his chastity and teaches virtue to his sons and chastity to his daughters, but they ultimately succumb to temptation when lured by the Cainites through the enchanting music of a flute. Another significant fall occurs at the Tower of Babel, which brings the total to four falls.

=== Assyrian and Mesopotamian setting ===
The setting of the narrative is closely tied to Assyria, identified with the biblical "land of Nod". Cain is exiled there, the Magi receive incense there, and Nimrod's journeys are situated in this land. Adiabene is equated with Nod-Shirakan, a toponym attested in inscriptions at Erbil and Karka d-Beth Slouq.

At the time of writing, many locations were already associated with Nimrod, such as Mosul, Nimrud-Athor, and Tell-Nimrud, the former capital of Ashurnasirpal, king of Assyria. References to places like Assur, Nineveh, and the shrine of Mar Qardagh at Melqi suggest that the native Mesopotamians of the period retained a living memory of their ancient Assyrian past, even though Tell-Nimrud itself had no continued settlement. The Cave of Treasures thus merges two traditions, Jewish-Christian and Assyrian. By the early sixth century, when the text was composed, these traditions had become intertwined into a shared foundation myth for the territory of Assyria.

The author engaged with these matters because he sought to construct a foundation myth for the Zoroastrian cult at a time when identifying Nimrod with Zoroaster was already commonplace. According to the Targum, Nimrod was the founder of Babil, Resen, and Nineveh. It was necessary for the Assyrian author to develop such mythologies in order to condemn foreign cults within his land and to explain the origins of foreign religions and portraying them as traditions that were later corrupted.

The Cave also links biblical Babylonian kings with contemporary Sasanian kings, identifying "Sisan the servant of Nimrod" with Sasanian kings and even presenting one of the Magi as king of Persia.

=== Nimrod ===
In contrast to St. Jerome and the Latin tradition which frequently depict Nimrod as a despotic ruler, the Syriac tradition takes a more positive stance and commemorates Nimrod as the introducer of monarchy, founder of many Mesopotamian cities from Edessa to Seleucia, and a royalty worthy of respect. Nimrod is also cast as a prophet, responsible for the prophecy regarding the star that would lead the Magi to the birth of Christ in Bethlehem. The author of the Cave enhances Nimrod's image by attributing authorship of this major revelation to him, suggesting that without his contribution, God's plan for mankind would remain incomplete. Similar to other Syriac writers like Narsai and Jacob of Serug, the Cave's author does not portray King Nimrod negatively in relation to the biblical Tower of Babel; rather, he is considered righteous and a descendant of Noah — so much that other Syriac Christians of the time have often been named after him.

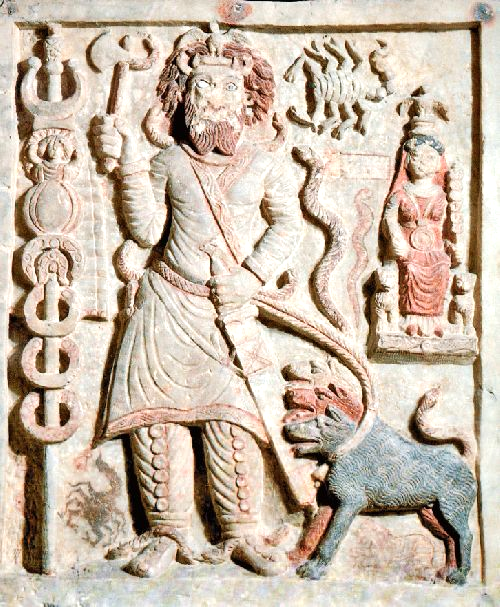
Nimrod is uniquely viewed in a positive light in the Syriac tradition, in contrast to Jewish and Western thought

The Cave also identifies Nimrod with Zoroaster himself. He is portrayed as a fire-worshipper, following the teaching of Yonton (a corruption of Joktan), Noah's fourth son. Nimrod was taught wisdom by Yonton when he traveled to Yokadra in the region of Nod and met with Yonton at Lake Atras. After bathing in the lake and having "made obeisance" to Yonton to acknowledge the latter's superiority, Nimrod was taught "wisdom and the book of revelation" by Yonton, emphasizing the role of legitimate practice of astronomy in contrast to the forbidden art of astrology. Fire, though associated with Zoroastrians, is presented as acceptable because of its Christian associations in the burning bush of Moses and Pentecost. This "orthodox" Zoroastrianism, however, later decayed through Satan's corruption of Ardashir, who introduced incest and the false arts of astrology (as opposed to astronomy). Although highly spiritual and supernatural in nature, this description aligns with the secular historical development of the region and its religions. In this framework, Zoroastrianism as practiced by the Assyrian descendants of Noah's son is not portrayed as inherently evil, but as a faith that only became corrupted through the influence of the devil.

=== Syriac identity and polemics ===
The Cave contains strong anti-Jewish polemics with emphasis on Syriac themes and images. Pilate is said not to have written the inscription in Syriac above the cross since Syrians were innocent of Christ's death; only Jews (Caiphas), Greeks (Herod), and Romans (Pilate) were guilty. The author maintains that Syriac, not Hebrew, was the original language of humanity, from which all other languages were dispersed after the events of the Tower of Babel. This distinction placed the Syriac language (and bracketing the Syriac people) as superior to all nations, namely the Greeks, Romans, and Hebrews. Moreover, the author refers to the Edessan dialect of Syriac as being considered the superior version of Aramaic, with Mesopotamian liturgical Syriac "annexing" other, lesser dialects.

Paganism and Neoplatonism are denounced with idols described as vessels of demons. The work confirms that pagan practices were still practiced in the 6th century in places like Harran when the text reached its final form.

=== Cosmology and Iranian motifs ===
The text provides fresh evidence for a newly discovered fraternity between the Assyrians and Persians of late antiquity. Despite heavy persecution by the Sassanids against the Syriac Christians, there was a familiarity with each other's cultures, leading to significant cultural and linguistic exchange between the two groups. Thus, the Syriac Christians were not merely a persecuted minority under an oppressive regime, but active agents of history who participated in every facet of Iranian society. It incorporates Iranian cosmological concepts, describing a tripartite heaven — Fire (ܢܘܪܐ; Nūrā), Light (ܢܘܗܪܐ; Nuhrā), and Firmament (ܪܩܝܥܐ; Rqīʿā) — in contrast to the seven-fold system widely adopted at the time, though Syriac Christianity had neither concept. This tripartite division of the sky is, however, attested in Akkadian sources. One example is KAR 307, a religious explanatory text in Neo-Assyrian script from Assur dated to the first millennium BC; another example is AO 8196, a late Babylonian compendium of astrological, astronomical, and religious information. The lowest level, Rqi'a, is associated with a major Iranian festival of Rapithwin which represents midday. Rapithwin is an Iranian loanword meaning "midday", personified as a man whose soul lingers above the earth.

=== Magi and treasures ===
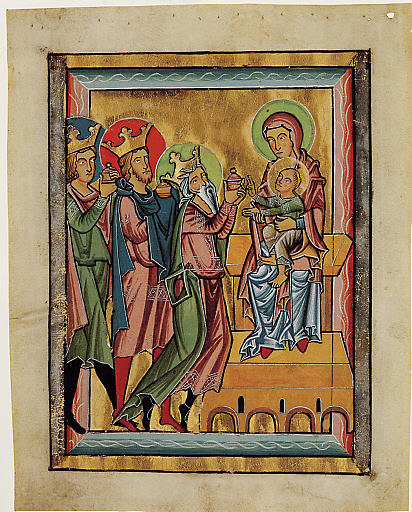
The Gospel of Matthew describes the Adoration of the Magi, in which three "wise men" from the East travel to Judea to worship the newborn Jesus Christ, presenting him with three gifts: gold, frankincense, and myrrh

The Magi (ܡܓܘܫܐ; Mgūšêh) are described as a group inhabiting Persia who become disturbed upon witnessing a constellation resembling "a maiden carrying a child" with "a crown set upon his head". After consulting their books, one of which is titled "The Revelation of Nimrod," God's plan for the birth of His Son becomes clear to them. They then journey to the "Cave of Treasure" where they retrieve the three gifts — gold, frankincense, and myrrh — deposited there from Paradise by Adam after the fall, and proceed to Bethlehem.

While most traditions viewed the Magi as three in number, the Syriac tradition held that they were twelve. This discrepancy was already recognized by Syriac-language authors such as Jacob of Edessa, who noted the difference between artistic depictions of the Nativity showing three Magi and his own tradition's teaching of twelve, some of whom were named Hormizd, Yazdgird, and Peroz.

=== Testament of Adam ===
This cycle was inserted into the original work in the Arabic recensions and differs in several respects from the Cave. It is an earlier Syriac composition that was appended to the text in those Arabic recensions. In this version the cave functions as the subject of a prophecy of Adam about the coming of the Messiah, transmitted through the generations to Christ; unlike the main cycle (the Cave of Treasures itself), it contains only the testament with the three gifts and omits Adam’s physical body. The composition is in three parts: an horarium of days and nights, the prophecy of Adam, and a list of the angelic hierarchy, the last of which is probably a later addition.

== Manuscripts and translations ==
The Cave of Treasures circulated widely in late antiquity and the medieval period, surviving in multiple versions and languages. The original Syriac text is extant in 34 manuscripts preserved in two different recensions. While these recensions diverge significantly, both ultimately derive from the same archetype. Each recension was discovered in separate regions, one in the Syriac Orthodox milieu and the other in the Church of the East, suggesting that they reflect the shared Syriac heritage of their respective communities while also bearing the imprint of their distinct theological perspectives.

Beyond Syriac, the work was translated into Arabic, Ethiopic, Georgian, and possibly Coptic.

The Arabic (مغارة الكنوز; Maghārat al-Kunūz) survives in two distinct versions. The earliest was translated in Egypt around 750 AD and survives in 46 manuscripts, though none have been translated into modern languages. This version contains significant additions not present in the Syriac, including the insertion of a "Testament of Adam". A second Arabic recension, written in Garshuni, is closer to the Syriac source.

The Ethiopic (መዝገብ ገዛ; Baʿāta Mazāgebet) version, composed sometime between the 13th and 14th centuries, is based on an Arabic Vorlage and has also not been translated. The Coptic survives in two fragmentary manuscripts, which once formed part of a complete text. These fragments correspond closely to the Syriac original and may predate the Arabic translation of 750. Their Greek linguistic features further suggest that a now-lost Greek version may have served as an intermediary.

A Georgian version was produced in the 8th century AD, closely following the Syriac text. However, it contains Arabic names and incorporates the Testament of Adam, which implies that it was translated from Arabic. Since it agrees more closely with the Syriac than with the earliest Arabic version, it likely derives from a different Arabic Vorlage, confirming the existence of two independent Arabic recensions.

These translations, in their attempt to reconcile and merge the two Syriac recensions, represent different interpretive traditions of the same work. One of the important manuscripts that many modern translations are based on is British Museum Add. 25875, preserved in London. Although not an original Syriac witness, its close textual correspondence to the ancient versions makes it more faithful to the archetype than either of the two surviving Syriac recensions.

Some passages from the Cave of Treasures are found in the Coptic Enconium of Mary Magdalene of Pseudo-Cyril.

== See also ==
- Chronicle of Zuqnin
- Chronicle of 1234
- Michael the Syrian's Chronicle
- Iranian history
- Assyrian continuity
- Biblical canon

== Sources ==
- Bauckham, Richard; Davila, James; Panayotov, Alex (2013-11-18). Old Testament Pseudepigrapha: More Noncanonical Scriptures. Wm. B. Eerdmans Publishing. ISBN 978-0-8028-2739-5.
- Brock, Sebastian P. (1997). A Brief Outline of Syriac Literature. Kottayam: St. Ephrem Ecumenical Research Institute.
- Brock, Sebastian P.; Butts, Aaron M.; Kiraz, George A.; Van Rompay, Lucas (2011). "Gorgias Encyclopedic Dictionary of the Syriac Heritage". Beth Mardutho. ISBN 9781593337148 – via Academia.edu.
- McDowell, Gavin (2025-10-13). The Rewritten Bible in Late Antiquity: »Pirqe de-Rabbi Eliezer«, »Jubilees«, and the »Cave of Treasures«. De Gruyter. doi:10.1515/9783111590776. ISBN 978-3-11-159033-2.
- Minov, Sergey (2013). "The Cave of Treasures and the Formation of Syriac Christian Identity in Late Antique Mesopotamia: Between Tradition and Innovation". Between Personal and Institutional Religion: Self, Doctrine, and Practice in Late Antique Eastern Christianity. Brepols: Turnhout. pp. 155–194.
- Minov, Sergey (2014). "Dynamics of Christian Acculturation in the Sasanian Empire: Some Iranian Motifs in the Cave of Treasures". Jews, Christians and Zoroastrians: Religious Dynamics in a Sasanian Context. Piscataway: Gorgias Press. pp. 149–201.
- Minov, Sergey (2017). "Date and Provenance of the Syriac Cave of Treasures: A Reappraisal". Hugoye: Journal of Syriac Studies. 20 (1): 129–229. doi:10.31826/hug-2018-200105.
- Minov, Sergey (2020). Memory and Identity in the Syriac Cave of Treasures: Rewriting the Bible in Sasanian Iran. Leiden-Boston: Brill. ISBN 9789004445512.
- Toepel, Alexander (2013). "The Cave of Treasures: A new Translation and Introduction". Old Testament Pseudepigrapha: More Noncanonical Scriptures. Vol. 1. Grand Rapids: William B. Eerdmans Publishing Company. pp. 531–584. ISBN 9780802827395.
- Toepel, Alexander (2019). "Late Paganism as Witnessed by the Syriac Cave of Treasures". Greek, Roman, and Byzantine Studies. 59 (3): 507–528.
- Wood, Philip (2011). Panicker, Geevarghese; Thekeparampil, Jakob; Kalakudi, Abraham (eds.). The Harp. Vol. 22. USA: Gorgias Press. pp. 131–140. doi:10.31826/9781463233112/html. ISBN 978-1-4632-3311-2.
- Wood, Philip (2012). "Syriac and the Syrians". The Oxford Handbook of Late Antiquity. Oxford: Oxford University Press. pp. 170–194. ISBN 978-0-19-027753-6.
- Wood, Philip (2019). "Historiography in the Syriac-Speaking World, 300–1000". In King, Daniel (ed.). The Syriac World. Routledge. ISBN 9780367732363.
- Marquis, Christine Luckritz (2016). "An Enconium of Mary Magdalene: A new translation and introduction". In Landau, B. (ed.). New Testament Apocrypha: More Noncanonical Scriptures. Vol. 1. William B. Eerdmans Publishing Company. ISBN 978-0-8028-7289-0.
