= Joshua the Stylite =

Joshua the Stylite (also spelled Yeshu Stylite and Ieshu Stylite) is the attributed author of a chronicle which narrates the history of the war between the Byzantine Empire and Persians between 502 and 506, and which is generally considered to be one of the earliest and most reliable historical documents to be preserved in Syriac.

The work owes its preservation to having been incorporated in the third part of the Chronicle of Zuqnin, and may probably have had a place in the second part of the Ecclesiastical History of John of Ephesus, from whom (as François Nau has shown) Pseudo-Dionysius copied all or most of the matter contained in his third part. The chronicle in question is anonymous, and Nau has shown that the note of a copyist, which was thought to assign it to the monk Joshua of Zuqnin near Amida (Diyarbakir), more probably refers to the compiler of the whole work in which it was incorporated. In any case, the author was an eyewitness of many of the events which he describes, and must have been living at Edessa during the years when it suffered so severely during the Roman–Persian Wars. He has a more complex approach to historical causation than many of his contemporaries, which takes into account human motivations, economic interests, tribal versus imperial politics, as well as the force of divine providence. For this, he has been called by some the Syriac Thucydides. His praise of Flavian II, the Chalcedonian patriarch of Antioch, in warmer terms than those in which he talk about his great Monophysite contemporaries, Jacob of Serugh and Philoxenus of Mabbog, has led some to think that he was an orthodox Catholic. But his exact religious orientation is far from being clear, since he praises the emperor Anastasius for his religious policies, which predominantly favoured the Monophysites.

The chronicle was first made known in Assemani's abridged Latin version (B O i. 260–83) and was edited in 1876 by Paulin Martin and (with an English translation) by William Wright in 1882. After an elaborate dedication to a friend the priest and abbot Sergius, a brief recapitulation of events from the death of Julian in 363 and a fuller account of the reigns of the Persian kings Peroz I (457-484) and Balash (484-488), the writer enters upon his main theme: the history of the disturbed relations between the Persian and Roman Empires from the beginning of the reign of Kavadh I (489–531), which culminated in the great war of 502–6.

From October 494 to the conclusion of peace near the end of 506, the author gives an annalistic account, with careful specification of dates, of the main events in Mesopotamia, the theatre of conflict such as the siege and capture of Amid by the Persians (502–3), their unsuccessful siege of Edessa (503), and the abortive attempt of the Romans to recover Amida (504–5). The work was probably written a few years after the conclusion of the war. The style is graphic and straightforward, and the author was evidently a man of good education and of a simple, honest mind.

A modern German translation with an extensive historical commentary was published 1997.
