= Opus Imperfectum =

Opus Imperfectum in Matthaeum is an early Christian commentary on the Gospel of Matthew, written sometime in the 5th century. Its name is derived from the fact that it is incomplete, omitting a number of passages from Matthew.

Its authorship was for centuries wrongly attributed to John Chrysostom, a misconception first refuted by Erasmus in 1530. Some candidates for its authorship include an Arian priest in Constantinople named Timothy; Maximinus, an Arian bishop who accompanied the Goths; and Anianus of Celeda.

It exhibits a mildly Arian Christology, and represents the sometimes confused theology that permeated Christianity in its formative centuries. It was well regarded into the Middle Ages in spite of its theological eccentricities, but fell out of widespread study after Erasmus' critique.

Thomas Aquinas was said to have remarked that he would rather have the completed work than to be mayor of Paris.

Gustavo Piemonte has attributed two group of homilies (C1 = 24-31, Migne: 756-798 and C2 = 46b-54, Migne: 897-946) to a lost work of Johannes Scotus Eriugena, the Tractatus in Matheum.

The Auxiliary Resources Page on the Electronic Manipulus florum Project website provides a digital transcription of this text from Migne's PG 56, 611-946.

The Opus Imperfectum is useful in dating the Revelation of the Magi, a Syrian Christian apocryphon of uncertain date. The Revelation only survives as a section in the 8th-century Zuqnin Chronicle, but the Opus Imperfectum describes and summarizes an unknown book of Seth (the third son of Adam and Eve) that seems to match the Revelation of the Magi well. This suggests that some form of the Revelation of the Magi existed by the 5th century at the latest, so that the Opus Imperfectum could summarize it.

The author of the Speculum Humanae Salvationis, a popular medieval work, may have been familiar with the Opus Imperfectum.
