= Chronicle of Zuqnin =

8th-century Syriac chronicle from Upper Mesopotamia

Chronicle of Zuqnin ܟܪܘܢܝܩܐ ܕܙܘܩܢ̈ܝܢ
- Vatican Library; British Library
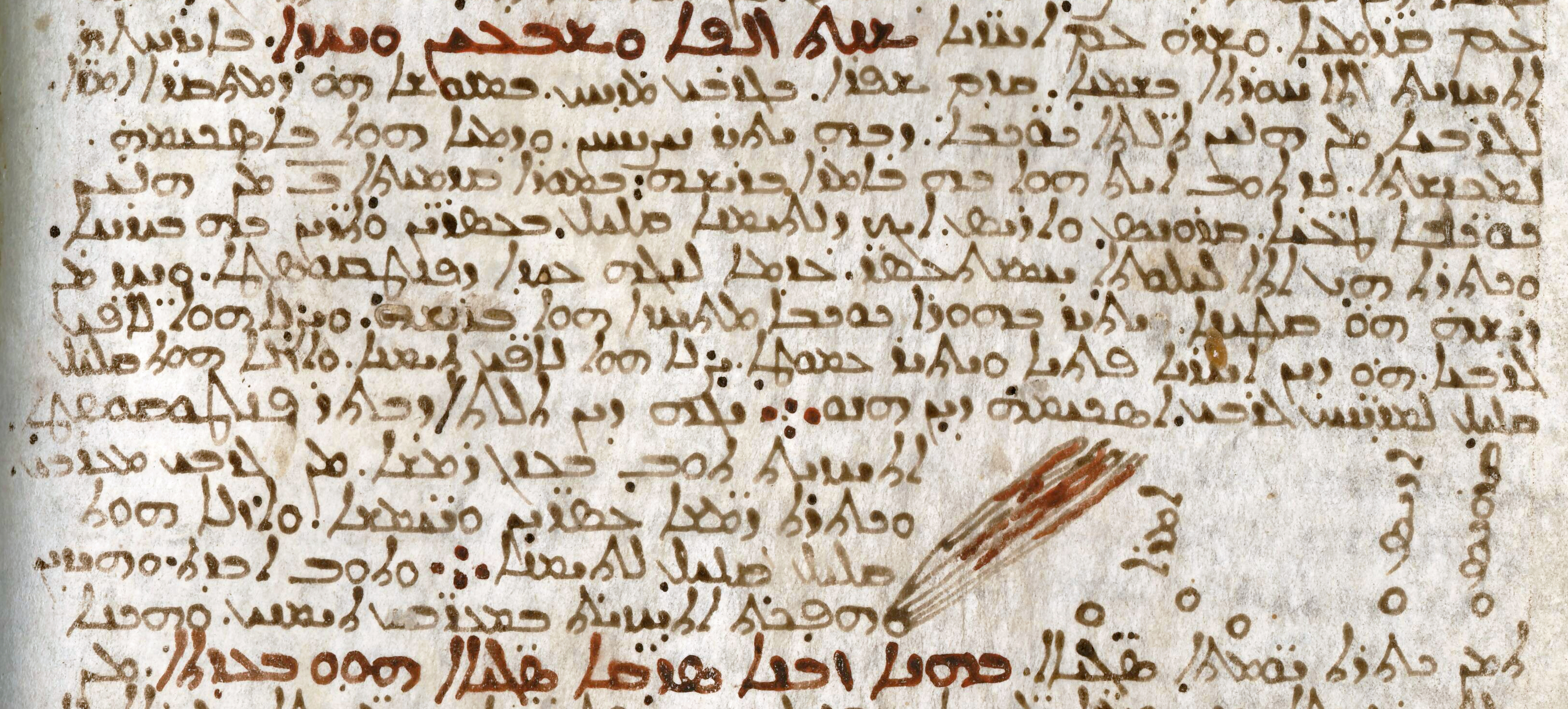
- Excerpt from the chronicle (fol.136v) describing & illustrating the appearance of a comet in iyyōr 1071 SE (May 760 AD)
- Type: Chronicle
- Date: mid-8th century AD
- Place of origin: Zuqnin Monastery
- Language: Classical Syriac with many Arabisms
- Scribe: Elisha of Zuqnin
- Author: Likely Joshua the Stylite
- Condition: Well-preserved palimpsest, damaged preface, missing first & last pages
- Contents: Biblical history, late antique Near Eastern events, early Islamic rule, spiritual commentary, anti-Chalcedonian polemics

The Chronicle of Zuqnin is an 8th-century Syriac historical work composed by a monk, most likely Joshua the Stylite, from the Monastery of Zuqnin near Amida on the upper Tigris. It covers history from the creation of the world to the mid-8th century AD with an account of political, social, and religious life in the Near East, in addition to spiritual affairs like miracles, martyrdom, and celestial observations from the author’s perspective and lived experience, during and after the Muslim conquest.

Divided into four parts, the chronicle draws from a variety of sources, both Syriac and non-Syriac, including the Bible and John of Ephesus, and also features the author's own original commentary. Some documents, such as the Revelation of the Magi, are only extant in this chronicle, making it an invaluable resource for modern academia and Syriac studies.

== Authorship ==
The author’s name and origins have not survived, which has led to several false attributions. The Maronite figure Giuseppe Simone Assemani once credited the work to Dionysius I of Tell-Mahre, the 9th-century Syriac Orthodox patriarch, for seemingly no reason, and this proved anachronistic. Recognizing the problem, Chabot introduced the conventional designation "Pseudo-Dionysius of Tell-Maḥrē", a name still commonly used in scholarship despite its lack of connection to the historical Dionysius, patriarch of Antioch.

The author of the Chronicle of Zuqnin remains anonymous, though it is generally agreed that he was a monk from a monastery in the region of Zuqnin near Amida (modern Diyarbakır), and most probably Joshua the Stylite. This association is partly due to a later colophon added by a Syrian monk, Elisha of Zuqnin, who copied the manuscript in the late 9th or early 10th century. While repairing damaged portions — especially from the Edessan Chronicle material — Elisha inserted Joshua’s name into the text and attributed the work to him. Elisha, who had lived for a time at the Monastery of Deir el-Surian in Egypt, likely made this copy during a return visit to Zuqnin. For this reason, several modern scholars, including François Nau, Amir Harrak, and Andrew Palmer, have supported Joshua’s authorship. Joshua likely wrote it at the request of his abbot, Sergius.

The monastery of Zuqnin, where the work was produced, was also a center of learning. Founded in the 4th century near Diyarbakir, it flourished as a major monastic and intellectual hub until its decline in the 10th century. Its library contained numerous manuscripts, including a biography of Matthew the Hermit.

=== Sources ===
The Chronicle of Zuqnin is structured around different source materials. For the biblical period, the author relied on the Syriac translation of Eusebius’s Chronicon; for the years 495–507, he incorporated a detailed Edessan chronicle of local events, and for the 6th century, he drew heavily on the now-lost second part of John of Ephesus’s Ecclesiastical History. The final section, covering the 8th century, is considered the author’s original contribution based his own knowledge and experience.

The chronicler drew on a wide variety of sources, both Syriac and non-Syriac. Among them were the Chronicon and Ecclesiastical History of Eusebius, the Ecclesiastical History of John of Ephesus, the Revelation of the Magi, the Plerophoria of John Rufus, and various Edessan chronicles, including the Chronicon of Jacob of Edessa. Non-Syriac material also appears, including from Theophanes, Al-Tabari, Al-Azadi, and even Neo-Babylonian chronicles that correlated planetary movements with fluctuations in market prices. The Bible was a major foundation as well, with the chronicler drawing heavily from both the Peshitta and the Septuagint.

== Structure and content ==
The Arab-Byzantine border in 740 AD, the time of writing of this chronicle

The Chronicle of Zuqnin begins with the creation of the world and extends to the author’s own time in c. 750 – c. 776 AD, and is divided into four parts. The first runs from Adam to Constantine, the second from Constantine to Theodosius the Lesser, the third continues to the reign of Justin II, and the fourth covers the years 599–775. The work is the largest Syriac historiographical composition written before the 8th century and it forms one of the most important sources for the history of the Jazira region in the period of the Abbasid caliph Abu Jafar Al-Mansur. It preserves valuable information not found anywhere else about the early history of Islam and the medieval Near East.

The text begins with a mutilated letter addressed to the author's spiritual fathers named "George the Chorepiscopos of Amid, Euthalius the Abbot, Lazarus the Periodeute, the honorable Anastasius, and the entire monastic community". In this letter, the chronicler describes his work using several Syriac designations, such as "commentary", "story", "account", and "memorandum". He also includes a list of living rulers like al-Mansur (r. 754–775) and al-Mahdi (r. 775–785). The manuscript contains numerous misspelled words, many of which were corrected by Chabot in his edition. Since most are phonetic in nature, it suggests that the content may have been dictated to the author.

Part III is largely based on John of Ephesus's Ecclesiastical History. It recounts the persecution of Miaphysite Christians under Chalcedonians, describing how monks were forced into a nomadic lifestyle for their safety, and how the Syriac Orthodox were suppressed by imperial authorities and Chalcedonian loyalists. It also narrates the plague of Justinian and its devastating impact on monastic communities on top of the Chalcedonian persecution, including John of Ephesus himself, who was eventually stricken.

Part IV covers the years 767–775, a period of economic collapse in Mesopotamia. The Abbasids, particularly Caliph al-Mansur and the governor of Mosul, Musa ibn Mus'ab, reduced the Jazira — long a breadbasket of the region — into ruin by exploiting its agricultural and human resources. The chronicler describes Musa ibn Mus'ab in highly personal terms like "a vessel of sin, son of perdition, advocate of the devil, and one who held everything sacred and religious in contempt".

=== Secular history and contemporary geopolitics ===
The chronicle comprises multiple unique details like the list of 80 kings of Edessa, a variety of hagiographical elements (miracles, non-human characters, grotesque martyrdoms), and the mere account of historical events.

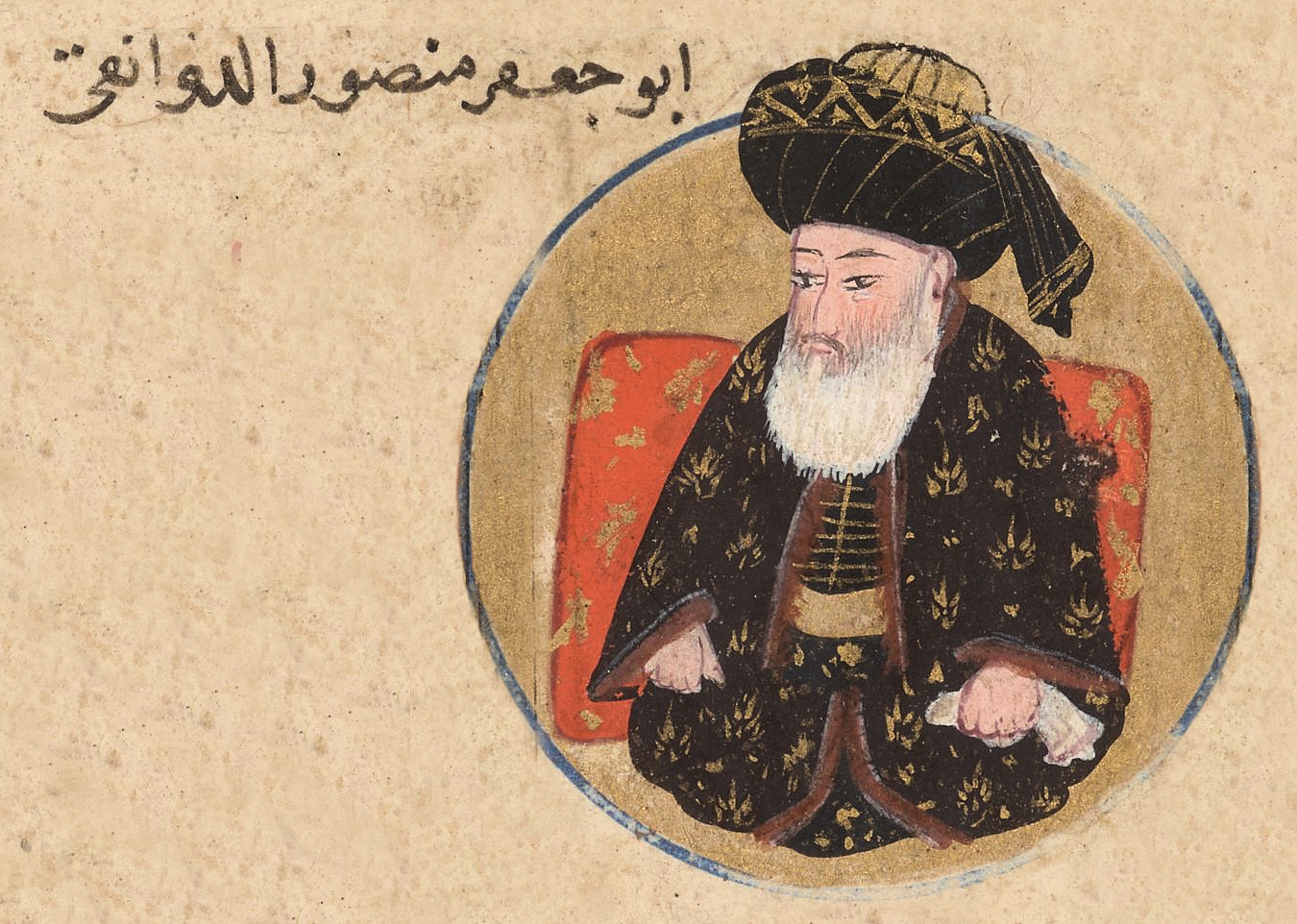
A portrait of Abbasid Caliph al-Mansur

The work recounts numerous historical events such as the destruction of a Nestorian monastery in Seleucid year 1077 (766 AD) on Mt. Qardu and a flood in Mosul soon afterwards. It offers a detailed account of the martyrdom of Cyrus of Harran when he was murdered for refusing to convert to Islam, in sharp contrast to many other Christians in the Jazira that apostatized under threat of financial instability. Similarly, the text recounts the life of Mar Habib, bishop of Edessa, and a miracle in which he saved a monastery in Upper Mesopotamia from Arab invaders.

The narrative presents significant detail concerning the oppressive economic policies devised by the Abbasid caliphs that devastated Upper Mesopotamia. Once a productive area abundant in water, manpower, and agricultural capacity, the territory turned desolate and sparsely populated due to heavy taxation and overutilization. Toward the end of the text, the author recounts a few stories that involve Christian-Muslim relations, including the execution of a Christian who converted to Islam but later recanted. Both Abbasid and Umayyad taxation policies are described in detail, with special attention to the violence that often accompanied them. The dire consequences of Islamic rule on Christians is mentioned, especially in the densely populated regions of the Jazira. The Arab-Byzantine border is presented as having suffered severely. While relations between Christians and Muslims were frequently marked by tension and violence, those between steadfast Christians and apostates were characterized by deep mistrust and ridicule of the other's faith.

The chronicle addresses major events like the iconoclast reforms of Yazid II, the wars waged by the Marwanid dynasty in Upper Mesopotamia, the career of Marwan II prior to his rise to caliph, and the broader conflicts between Muslims and the Khazars and Romans. The compiler provides a detailed narration of Church affairs in the style of Michael the Syrian’s chronicle. The author also points out, like John of Ephesus, that the state remains opposed to Miaphysite Orthodoxy in all forms, which led to the heavy persecution of the Syriac Orthodox faithful. It also narrates the campaigns of the Umayyad prince Maslama against the Romans under Emperor Leo III and the Turks. Furthermore, the chronicle discusses the Abbasid revolution, noting the helpless conditions of Christians during that time and the hardships faced by the Arabs under the Persians.

Multiple schisms within Christendom caused three parallel ecclesiastical structures to develop by the 8th century: the Imperial (Chalcedonian) Church, the Oriental Orthodox Churches, and the Church of the East; a pervasive theme in the chronicle is the persecution imposed by the Byzantine Empire on the latter two

The text further discusses the social and cultural context and events pertaining to the Arabization of Upper Mesopotamia during the Abbasid rule. It underscores the deepening confessional divide between the Miaphysites and Chalcedonians to the extent that the author sees the early Islamic conquests as a liberation from the "tyranny of the Romans". He portrays the Byzantine persecutors as worse than the Muslims, despite detailing the latter's persecution of the Assyrians quite vividly. The Chalcedonians, as the chronicle explains, have abandoned their language and traditions in favor of those of the invading Arab Muslims, assimilating into the larger Arab society. In contrast, the Jacobites maintained a stronger preference for and preservation of Syriac culture well into the Crusades.

The chronicle is one of the few Syriac sources, alongside works like the Life of Simeon of the Olives, from the seventh and eighth centuries that document socio-economic activities at a micro level.

=== Spirituality ===
Like other chronicles past and present, this chronicle emphasizes that worldly punishments like plagues, earthquakes, and droughts were brought upon by God to punish corrupt human behavior — a theme common to biblical thought, Byzantine chronography, and more than anything else, Assyrian and Babylonian literature. Historical examples of punishment for sin are presented so that future generations would take heed and not sin, even stating "It is our own fault; because we sinned, slaves have become our masters" with regard to persecution by Muslims. When Muslims conquered the monastery of St. Simeon the Stylite and took many innocent Christian captives, the author blames this on the lack of faithfulness and fasting among them, who opted for the debauchery of drunkenness, dancing, and festivals. Likewise, when Arabs were driven away near Aleppo in 813, they had no one to blame but themselves as the author attributes this to their disobedience to God.

The chronicler frequently compares his own time to the period of biblical history, a common feature of the Syriac tradition in which later writers build on earlier ones. He compares the Abbasids to the Assyrians and Egyptians of Scripture who oppressed the people of God — the Israelites at the time and the Christians in his own time, the Syriac Orthodox in particular.

The chronicle discusses the persecutions of the Miaphysite faithful amid significant Chalcedonian incursions. It also highlights a distinctly separate experience; while Chalcedonians grappled with their ecumenical councils, these matters were merely historical footnotes for the Miaphysites, irrelevant to the non-Chalcedonian Churches in the East. Although anti-Chalcedonian sentiment is strong throughout, the chronicle still longs for Church unity despite the harsh memories of persecution.

The chronicle includes a letter from the Jews to Emperor Marcian in which they ask for forgiveness for their transgressions in crucifying the Messiah and request permission to reopen their synagogues. They argue that, as Chalcedon has affirmed, what was crucified was merely a man and not God Himself. This serves as a polemic against Chalcedonians and not so much against the Jews.

Astronomical phenomena are vividly described with detailed drawings, including multiple auroras, unusual clouds, and comets, most famously a two-tailed sighting of Halley's Comet in 760. These are framed as supernatural warnings connected to divine wrath and the Second Coming.

One section of interest is called the Revelation of the Magi, found in pages 17–25. The story, an expansion of the Adoration of the Magi as seen in the Gospel of Matthew, appears to date from some point in the 2nd–5th century, but was preserved nowhere else than the Zuqnin chronicle.

=== Language, style, and structure ===
Arabisms are similar to Garshuni, but rather than Garshuni's Arabic words being directly transliterated using the Syriac alphabet, they are "Syriacized" to a certain extent beforehand

The chronicle's structure is chronological but lacks a consistent division between years and periods. Events are dated mainly by the Seleucid calendar which is called the "era of Alexander" or "of the Greeks", though the Hijri, Antiochene, and Laodicean calendars appear once each.

The work contains plenty of Arabisms as well, which reflect the author's own familiarity with Arabic. Examples include ܥܣܟܪ ('Askir) for عسكر ('Askar), meaning military; ܪܣܘܠܐ (Rasūlā) for رسول (Rasūl), meaning "messenger" and referring to Mohammed; ܫܠܬܢܐ (Šultānā) for سلطان (Sulṭān), meaning "governor"; and ܫܪ̈ܬܐ (Šartā) for شرطة (Šurṭa), meaning "police". Even when native Syriac cognates exist, the author opted for Arabisms instead, such as ܓܙܝܪܬܐ (Jazīrtā) for جزيرة (Jazīra) instead of the native ܒܝܬ ܢܗܪ̈ܝܢ (Bêth Nahrain), meaning "Mesopotamia"; ܓܘܫܕܐ (Gušdā) for جسد (Jasad) instead of the native ܫܠܕܐ (Šaldā), meaning "body"; and ܒܓܠܐ (Bağlā) for بغل (Bağl) instead of the native ܟܕܢܐ (Kadnā), meaning "mule".

Since the text contains many grammatical and spelling errors, Amir Harrak suggests that its author was probably not a scholarly historian like Michael the Syrian or Gregory Barhebraeus, but rather a monk who spent much of his time in prayer and meditation on a pillar. Harrak describes the author as an "ardent moralist" — someone who heavily criticized anyone he believed had done wrong, regardless of their religious or ethnic background, and in graphic detail, where people and events are presented in stark extremes with little nuance in between. Many of the misspelled words were fixed in modern editions and translations, and since most of these errors are phonetic in nature, it may indicate that some content was dictated to the author.

In addition, the chronicle preserves Akkadian words and toponyms in the Syriac dialect of that time, as referenced in the chronicle regarding the castle "ÉGAL" of Sennacherib, whom the author calls "king of Assyria".

== Manuscripts ==
The entire chronicle survives in a single palimpsest manuscript of 179 folios, of which 173 are now preserved in the Vatican Library as Codex Zuqninensis (Vat. Syr. 162), acquired from the Monastery of Deir el-Surian in Egypt by Assemani, while 6 folios (ff. 2-7) are held in the British Library (Add. 14,665). The first and last folios are missing but a heavily damaged preface still survives. The manuscript is thought to be an autographon that was begun in 773–774 and completed between 775–776. A digital version of the Vatican manuscript is available online through the Vatican Library.

Part II of the chronicle has been edited and translated multiple times. Paul Martin produced a French edition in 1876, William Wright an English edition in 1882, Archbishop Mor Yohanon Dolabani issued an edition in Mardin in 1959, and N. V. Pigulevskaya prepared a Russian translation in 1940. J. B. Chabot also translated Part I into Latin (1872) and later published French translations of Parts II and IV; Hespel also produced a French translation of Part IV.

== See also ==
- Chronicle of 1234
- Michael the Syrian's Chronicle
- Syriac Christianity
- Christology
- Council of Ephesus
- Council of Chalcedon
- Arab-Byzantine wars
- Battle of the Zab

== Sources ==
- Barsoum, Ignatius Aphram (2003). The Scattered Pearls: A History of Syriac Literature and Sciences. Translated by Moosa, Matti (Second rev. ed.). Piscataway (N. J.): Gorgias Press. ISBN 1-931956-04-9.
- Brock, Sebastian P.; Butts, Aaron M.; Kiraz, George A.; Van Rompay, Lucas; E. Fiano (2011). "Gorgias Encyclopedic Dictionary of the Syriac Heritage". Beth Mardutho. ISBN 9781593337148 – via Academia.edu.
- Harrak, Amir (1998). "Arabisms in Part IV of the Syriac Chronicle of Zuqnin". Symposium Syriacum VII. Roma: Pontificio Istituto Orientale. pp. 469–498. ISBN 9788872103197.
- Harrak, Amir, ed. (1999). The Chronicle of Zuqnīn, Parts III and IV: A.D. 488-775. Toronto: Pontifical Institute of Mediaeval Studies. ISBN 9780888442864.
- Harrak, Amir (2005). "Ah! The Assyrian is the Rod of My Hand!: Syriac View of History after the Advent of Islam". Redefining Christian Identity: Cultural Interaction in the Middle East Since the Rise of Islam. Leuven: Peeters Publishers. pp. 45–65. ISBN 9789042914186.
- Harrak, Amir (2009). "Joshua the Stylite of Zuqnīn". Christian-Muslim Relations: A Bibliographical History. Vol. 1. Leiden-Boston: Brill. pp. 322–326. ISBN 9789004169753.
- Harrak, Amir (2011a). "Zuqnin, Chronicle of". Gorgias Encyclopedic Dictionary of the Syriac Heritage. Piscataway, NJ: Gorgias Press. p. 450.
- Harrak, Amir (2011b). "Chronicles, Syriac". Gorgias Encyclopedic Dictionary of the Syriac Heritage. Piscataway, NJ: Gorgias Press. pp. 98–99.
- Harrak, Amir, ed. (2017). The Chronicle of Zuqnīn, Parts I and II: From the Creation to the Year 506/7 AD. Piscataway, NJ: Gorgias Press. doi:10.31826/9781463237370-002.
- Morony, Michael G. (2005). "History and Identity in the Syrian Churches". Redefining Christian Identity: Cultural Interaction in the Middle East Since the Rise of Islam. Leuven: Peeters Publishers. ISBN 9789042914186.
- Witakowski, Witold, ed. (1987). The Syriac Chronicle of Pseudo-Dionysius of Tel-Mahrē: A Study in the History of Historiography. Uppsala-Stockholm: University of Uppsala. ISBN 9789155419677.
- Witakowski, Witold, ed. (1996). Pseudo-Dionysius of Tel-Mahre: Chronicle (Known also as the Chronicle of Zuqnin), Part III. Liverpool: Liverpool University Press. ISBN 9780853237600.
- Witakowski, Witold (2011). "Historiography, Syriac". Gorgias Encyclopedic Dictionary of the Syriac Heritage. Piscataway, NJ: Gorgias Press. pp. 199–203.
- Witakowski, Witold (2008). "The Magi in Syriac tradition". In Kiraz, George (ed.). Malphono w-Rabo d-Malphone: Studies in Honor of Sebastian P. Brock. Gorgias Press. pp. 809–844. doi:10.31826/9781463214814-037. ISBN 978-1-59333-706-3.
- Wood, Philip (2011). "The Chroniclers of Zuqnin and Their Times (c. 720-75)". Parole de l'Orient. 36: 549–568.
